= UQP =

UQP or Uqp may refer to:

- University of Queensland Press
- Unquadpentium, an unsynthesized chemical element with atomic number 145 and symbol Uqp
