= Pekka Pyykkö =

Finnish academic (born 1941)

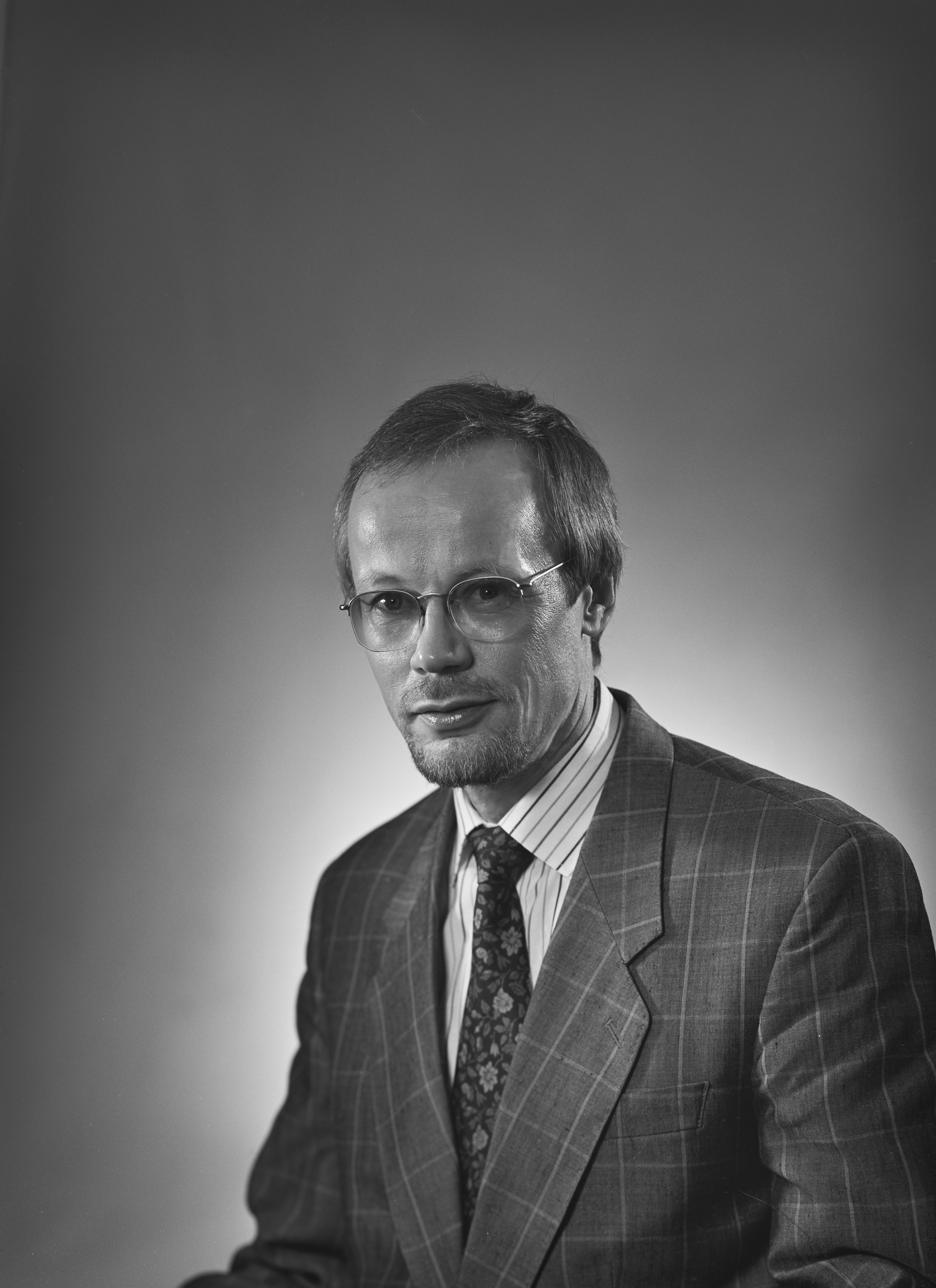
Pekka Pyykkö in 1991

Veli Pekka Pyykkö (born 12 October 1941) is a Finnish academic. He was professor of Chemistry at the University of Helsinki. From 2009–2012, he was the chairman of the International Academy of Quantum Molecular Science. He is known for his extension to the periodic table of elements, known as the Pyykkö model.

Pyykkö has also studied the relativistic effects present in heavy atoms and their effects in NMR.

== Pyykkö model ==
After the 118 elements now known, Pekka Pyykkö predicts that the orbital shells will fill up in this order:

- 8s,
- 5g,
- the first two spaces of 8p,
- 6f,
- 7d,
- 9s,
- the first two spaces of 9p,
- the rest of 8p.

He also suggests that period 8 be split into three parts:

- 8a, containing 8s,
- 8b, containing the first two elements of 8p,
- 8c, containing 7d and the rest of 8p.

Pyykkö model
	Pyykkö-displaced elements are in boldface
**8**	119; Uue	120; Ubn	121; Ubu	122; Ubb	123; Ubt	124; Ubq	125; Ubp	126; Ubh	127; Ubs	128; Ubo	129; Ube	130; Utn	131; Utu	132; Utb	133; Utt	134; Utq	135; Utp	136; Uth	137; Uts	138; Uto	141; Uqu	142; Uqb	143; Uqt	144; Uqq	145; Uqp	146; Uqh	147; Uqs	148; Uqo	149; Uqe	150; Upn	151; Upu	152; Upb	153; Upt	154; Upq	155; Upp	156; Uph	157; Ups	158; Upo	159; Upe	160; Uhn	161; Uhu	162; Uhb	163; Uht	164; Uhq	**139**; **Ute**	**140**; **Uqn**	169; Uhe	170; Usn	171; Usu	172; Usb
**9**	**165**; **Uhp**	**166**; **Uhh**																																											**167**; **Uhs**	**168**; **Uho**
	s-block		g-block																		f-block														d-block										p-block

The compact version:

Extended periodic table. P. Pyykkö, PCCP 2011, 13, 161. @RSC. Reprinted with permission.

Pekka Pyykkö correctly predicted the existence of chemical bonds between gold and the noble gas xenon, which is usually inert; this bond is known to occur in the cationic complex tetraxenonogold(II) (AuXe^{2+}_{4}). He also correctly predicted the existence of gold–carbon triple bonds.
