= Unbiunium =

Unbiunium, _{121}Ubu
Theoretical element

Unbiunium
- Pronunciation: /ˌuːnbaɪˈuːniəm/ (OON-by-OON-ee-əm)
- Alternative names: eka-actinium, superactinium

Unbiunium in the periodic table
Hydrogen																															Helium
Lithium	Beryllium																									Boron	Carbon	Nitrogen	Oxygen	Fluorine	Neon
Sodium	Magnesium																									Aluminium	Silicon	Phosphorus	Sulfur	Chlorine	Argon
Potassium	Calcium															Scandium	Titanium	Vanadium	Chromium	Manganese	Iron	Cobalt	Nickel	Copper	Zinc	Gallium	Germanium	Arsenic	Selenium	Bromine	Krypton
Rubidium	Strontium															Yttrium	Zirconium	Niobium	Molybdenum	Technetium	Ruthenium	Rhodium	Palladium	Silver	Cadmium	Indium	Tin	Antimony	Tellurium	Iodine	Xenon
Caesium	Barium	Lanthanum	Cerium	Praseodymium	Neodymium	Promethium	Samarium	Europium	Gadolinium	Terbium	Dysprosium	Holmium	Erbium	Thulium	Ytterbium	Lutetium	Hafnium	Tantalum	Tungsten	Rhenium	Osmium	Iridium	Platinum	Gold	Mercury (element)	Thallium	Lead	Bismuth	Polonium	Astatine	Radon
Francium	Radium	Actinium	Thorium	Protactinium	Uranium	Neptunium	Plutonium	Americium	Curium	Berkelium	Californium	Einsteinium	Fermium	Mendelevium	Nobelium	Lawrencium	Rutherfordium	Dubnium	Seaborgium	Bohrium	Hassium	Meitnerium	Darmstadtium	Roentgenium	Copernicium	Nihonium	Flerovium	Moscovium	Livermorium	Tennessine	Oganesson
Ununennium	Unbinilium	Unquadtrium	Unquadquadium	Unquadpentium	Unquadhexium	Unquadseptium	Unquadoctium	Unquadennium	Unpentnilium	Unpentunium	Unpentbium	Unpenttrium	Unpentquadium	Unpentpentium	Unpenthexium	Unpentseptium	Unpentoctium	Unpentennium	Unhexnilium	Unhexunium	Unhexbium	Unhextrium	Unhexquadium	Unhexpentium	Unhexhexium	Unhexseptium	Unhexoctium	Unhexennium	Unseptnilium	Unseptunium	Unseptbium
		Unbiunium	Unbibium	Unbitrium	Unbiquadium	Unbipentium	Unbihexium	Unbiseptium	Unbioctium	Unbiennium	Untrinilium	Untriunium	Untribium	Untritrium	Untriquadium	Untripentium	Untrihexium	Untriseptium	Untrioctium	Untriennium	Unquadnilium	Unquadunium	Unquadbium
Ac
↑
Ubu
↓
—
unbinilium ← unbiunium → unbibium
- Atomic number (Z): 121
- Group: g-block groups (no number)
- Period: period 8 (theoretical, extended table)
- Block: g-block
- Electron configuration: [Og] 8s^{2} 8p^{1} (predicted)
- Electrons per shell: 2, 8, 18, 32, 32, 18, 8, 3 (predicted)

Physical properties
- Phase at STP: unknown

Atomic properties
- Oxidation states: common: (none) (+3)
- Ionization energies: 1st: 429.4 (predicted) kJ/mol

Other properties
- CAS Number: 54500-70-8

History
- Naming: IUPAC systematic element name

Unbiunium, also known as eka-actinium or element 121, is a hypothetical chemical element; it has symbol Ubu and atomic number 121. Unbiunium and Ubu are the temporary systematic IUPAC name and symbol respectively, which are used until the element is discovered, confirmed, and a permanent name is decided upon. In the periodic table of the elements, it is expected to be the first of the superactinides, and the third element in the eighth period. It has attracted attention because of some predictions that it may be in the island of stability. It is also likely to be the first of a new g-block of elements.

Unbiunium has not yet been synthesized. It is expected to be one of the last few reachable elements with current technology; the limit could be anywhere between element 120 and 124. It will also likely be far more difficult to synthesize than the elements known so far up to 118, and still more difficult than elements 119 and 120. The teams at RIKEN in Japan and at the JINR in Dubna, Russia have indicated plans to attempt the synthesis of element 121 in the future after they attempt elements 119 and 120.

The position of unbiunium in the periodic table suggests that it would have similar properties to lanthanum and actinium; however, relativistic effects may cause some of its properties to differ from those expected from a straight application of periodic trends. For example, unbiunium is expected to have a s^{2}p valence electron configuration, instead of the s^{2}d of lanthanum and actinium or the s^{2}g expected from the Madelung rule, but this is not predicted to affect its chemistry much. It would on the other hand significantly lower its first ionization energy beyond what would be expected from periodic trends.

== Introduction ==
=== Synthesis of superheavy nuclei ===
A graphic depiction of a nuclear fusion reaction. Two nuclei fuse into one, emitting a neutron. Reactions that created new elements to this moment were similar, though varying numbers of neutrons – or alternatively charged particles – may be emitted instead.

A superheavy (Note: In nuclear physics, an element is called heavy if its atomic number is high; lead (element 82) is one example of such a heavy element. The term "superheavy elements" typically refers to elements with atomic number greater than 103 (although there are other definitions, such as atomic number greater than 100 or 112; sometimes, the term is presented an equivalent to the term "transactinide", which puts an upper limit before the beginning of the hypothetical superactinide series). Terms "heavy isotopes" (of a given element) and "heavy nuclei" mean what could be understood in the common language—isotopes of high mass (for the given element) and nuclei of high mass, respectively.) atomic nucleus is created in a nuclear reaction that combines two other nuclei of unequal size (Note: In 2009, a team at the JINR led by Oganessian published results of their attempt to create hassium in a symmetric ^{136}Xe + ^{136}Xe reaction. They failed to observe a single atom in such a reaction, putting the upper limit on the cross section, the measure of probability of a nuclear reaction, as 2.5 pb. In comparison, the reaction that resulted in hassium discovery, ^{208}Pb + ^{58}Fe, had a cross section of ~20 pb (more specifically, 19^{+19}_{-11} pb), as estimated by the discoverers.) into one; roughly, the more unequal the two nuclei in terms of mass, the greater the possibility that the two react. The material made of the heavier nuclei is made into a target, which is then bombarded by the beam of lighter nuclei. Two nuclei can only fuse into one if they are close enough to each other; normally, nuclei (all positively charged) repel each other due to electrostatic repulsion. The strong interaction can overcome this repulsion but only within a very short distance from a nucleus; beam nuclei are thus greatly accelerated in order to make such repulsion insignificant compared to the velocity of the beam nucleus. The energy applied to the beam nuclei to accelerate them can cause them to reach speeds as high as one-tenth of the speed of light. However, if too much energy is applied, the beam nucleus can fall apart.

Coming close enough alone is not enough for two nuclei to fuse: when two nuclei approach each other, they usually remain together for about 10^{−20} seconds and then part ways (not necessarily in the same composition as before the reaction) rather than form a single nucleus. This happens because during the attempted formation of a single nucleus, electrostatic repulsion tears apart the nucleus that is being formed. Each pair of a target and a beam is characterized by its cross section—the probability that fusion will occur if two nuclei approach one another expressed in terms of the transverse area that the incident particle must hit in order for the fusion to occur. (Note: The amount of energy applied to the beam particle to accelerate it can also influence the value of cross section. For example, in the ^{28}_{14}Si + ^{1}_{0}n → ^{28}_{13}Al + ^{1}_{1}p reaction, cross section changes smoothly from 370 mb at 12.3 MeV to 160 mb at 18.3 MeV, with a broad peak at 13.5 MeV with the maximum value of 380 mb.) This fusion may occur as a result of the quantum effect in which nuclei can tunnel through electrostatic repulsion. If the two nuclei can stay close past that phase, multiple nuclear interactions result in redistribution of energy and an energy equilibrium.

External videos
- Visualization of unsuccessful nuclear fusion, based on calculations from the Australian National University

The resulting merger is an excited state—termed a compound nucleus—and thus it is very unstable. To reach a more stable state, the temporary merger may fission without formation of a more stable nucleus. Alternatively, the compound nucleus may eject a few neutrons, which would carry away the excitation energy; if the latter is not sufficient for a neutron expulsion, the merger would produce a gamma ray. This happens in about 10^{−16} seconds after the initial nuclear collision and results in creation of a more stable nucleus. The definition by the IUPAC/IUPAP Joint Working Party (JWP) states that a chemical element can only be recognized as discovered if a nucleus of it exists for at least 10^{−14} seconds. This value was chosen as an estimate of how long it takes a nucleus to acquire electrons and thus display its chemical properties. (Note: This figure also marks the generally accepted upper limit for lifetime of a compound nucleus.)

=== Decay and detection ===
The beam passes through the target and reaches the next chamber, the separator; if a new nucleus is produced, it is carried with this beam. In the separator, the newly produced nucleus is separated from other nuclides (that of the original beam and any other reaction products) (Note: This separation is based on that the resulting nuclei move past the target more slowly then the unreacted beam nuclei. The separator contains electric and magnetic fields whose effects on a moving particle cancel out for a specific velocity of a particle. Such separation can also be aided by a time-of-flight measurement and a recoil energy measurement; a combination of the two may allow to estimate the mass of a nucleus.) and transferred to a surface-barrier detector, which stops the nucleus. The exact location of the upcoming impact on the detector is marked; also marked are its energy and the time of the arrival. The transfer takes about 10^{−6} seconds; in order to be detected, the nucleus must survive this long. The nucleus is recorded again once its decay is registered, and the location, the energy, and the time of the decay are measured.

Stability of a nucleus is provided by the strong interaction. However, its range is very short; as nuclei become larger, its influence on the outermost nucleons (protons and neutrons) weakens. At the same time, the nucleus is torn apart by electrostatic repulsion between protons, and its range is not limited. Total binding energy provided by the strong interaction increases linearly with the number of nucleons, whereas electrostatic repulsion increases with the square of the atomic number, i.e. the latter grows faster and becomes increasingly important for heavy and superheavy nuclei. Superheavy nuclei are thus theoretically predicted and have so far been observed to predominantly decay via decay modes that are caused by such repulsion: alpha decay and spontaneous fission. (Note: Not all decay modes are caused by electrostatic repulsion. For example, beta decay is caused by the weak interaction.) Almost all alpha emitters have over 210 nucleons, and the lightest nuclide primarily undergoing spontaneous fission has 238. In both decay modes, nuclei are inhibited from decaying by corresponding energy barriers for each mode, but they can be tunneled through.

Scheme of an apparatus for creation of superheavy elements, based on the Dubna Gas-Filled Recoil Separator set up in the Flerov Laboratory of Nuclear Reactions in JINR. The trajectory within the detector and the beam focusing apparatus changes because of a dipole magnet in the former and quadrupole magnets in the latter.

Alpha particles are commonly produced in radioactive decays because the mass of an alpha particle per nucleon is small enough to leave some energy for the alpha particle to be used as kinetic energy to leave the nucleus. Spontaneous fission is caused by electrostatic repulsion tearing the nucleus apart and produces various nuclei in different instances of identical nuclei fissioning. As the atomic number increases, spontaneous fission rapidly becomes more important: spontaneous fission partial half-lives decrease by 23 orders of magnitude from uranium (element 92) to nobelium (element 102), and by 30 orders of magnitude from thorium (element 90) to fermium (element 100). The earlier liquid drop model thus suggested that spontaneous fission would occur nearly instantly due to disappearance of the fission barrier for nuclei with about 280 nucleons. The later nuclear shell model suggested that nuclei with about 300 nucleons would form an island of stability in which nuclei will be more resistant to spontaneous fission and will primarily undergo alpha decay with longer half-lives. Subsequent discoveries suggested that the predicted island might be further than originally anticipated; they also showed that nuclei intermediate between the long-lived actinides and the predicted island are deformed, and gain additional stability from shell effects. Experiments on lighter superheavy nuclei, as well as those closer to the expected island, have shown greater than previously anticipated stability against spontaneous fission, showing the importance of shell effects on nuclei. (Note: It was already known by the 1960s that ground states of nuclei differed in energy and shape as well as that certain magic numbers of nucleons corresponded to greater stability of a nucleus. However, it was assumed that there was no nuclear structure in superheavy nuclei as they were too deformed to form one.)

Alpha decays are registered by the emitted alpha particles, and the decay products are easy to determine before the actual decay; if such a decay or a series of consecutive decays produces a known nucleus, the original product of a reaction can be easily determined. (Note: Since mass of a nucleus is not measured directly but is rather calculated from that of another nucleus, such measurement is called indirect. Direct measurements are also possible, but for the most part they have remained unavailable for superheavy nuclei. The first direct measurement of mass of a superheavy nucleus was reported in 2018 at LBNL. Mass was determined from the location of a nucleus after the transfer (the location helps determine its trajectory, which is linked to the mass-to-charge ratio of the nucleus, since the transfer was done in presence of a magnet).) (That all decays within a decay chain were indeed related to each other is established by the location of these decays, which must be in the same place.) The known nucleus can be recognized by the specific characteristics of decay it undergoes such as decay energy (or more specifically, the kinetic energy of the emitted particle). (Note: If the decay occurred in a vacuum, then since total momentum of an isolated system before and after the decay must be preserved, the daughter nucleus would also receive a small velocity. The ratio of the two velocities, and accordingly the ratio of the kinetic energies, would thus be inverse to the ratio of the two masses. The decay energy equals the sum of the known kinetic energy of the alpha particle and that of the daughter nucleus (an exact fraction of the former). The calculations hold for an experiment as well, but the difference is that the nucleus does not move after the decay because it is tied to the detector.) Spontaneous fission, however, produces various nuclei as products, so the original nuclide cannot be determined from its daughters. (Note: Spontaneous fission was discovered by Soviet physicist Georgy Flerov, a leading scientist at JINR, and thus it was a "hobbyhorse" for the facility. In contrast, the LBL scientists believed fission information was not sufficient for a claim of synthesis of an element. They believed spontaneous fission had not been studied enough to use it for identification of a new element, since there was a difficulty of establishing that a compound nucleus had only ejected neutrons and not charged particles like protons or alpha particles. They thus preferred to link new isotopes to the already known ones by successive alpha decays.)

The information available to physicists aiming to synthesize a superheavy element is thus the information collected at the detectors: location, energy, and time of arrival of a particle to the detector, and those of its decay. The physicists analyze this data and seek to conclude that it was indeed caused by a new element and could not have been caused by a different nuclide than the one claimed. Often, provided data is insufficient for a conclusion that a new element was definitely created and there is no other explanation for the observed effects; errors in interpreting data have been made. (Note: For instance, element 102 was mistakenly identified in 1957 at the Nobel Institute of Physics in Stockholm, Stockholm County, Sweden. There were no earlier definitive claims of creation of this element, and the element was assigned a name by its Swedish, American, and British discoverers, nobelium. It was later shown that the identification was incorrect. The following year, RL was unable to reproduce the Swedish results and announced instead their synthesis of the element; that claim was also disproved later. JINR insisted that they were the first to create the element and suggested a name of their own for the new element, joliotium; the Soviet name was also not accepted (JINR later referred to the naming of the element 102 as "hasty"). This name was proposed to IUPAC in a written response to their ruling on priority of discovery claims of elements, signed 29 September 1992. The name "nobelium" remained unchanged on account of its widespread usage.)

== History ==
Chart of nuclide stability as used by the Dubna team in 2010. Characterized isotopes are shown with borders. Beyond element 118 (oganesson, the last known element), the line of known nuclides is expected to rapidly enter a region of instability, with no half-lives over one microsecond after element 121. The elliptical region encloses the predicted location of the island of stability.

Fusion reactions producing superheavy elements can be divided into "hot" and "cold" fusion, (Note: Despite the name, "cold fusion" in the context of superheavy element synthesis is a distinct concept from the idea that nuclear fusion can be achieved in room temperature conditions (see cold fusion).) depending on the excitation energy of the compound nucleus produced. In hot fusion reactions, very light, high-energy projectiles are accelerated toward very heavy targets (actinides), giving rise to compound nuclei at high excitation energies (~40–50 MeV) that may fission or evaporate several (3 to 5) neutrons. In cold fusion reactions (which use heavier projectiles, typically from the fourth period, and lighter targets, usually lead and bismuth), the fused nuclei produced have a relatively low excitation energy (~10–20 MeV), which decreases the probability that these products will undergo fission reactions. As the fused nuclei cool to the ground state, they require emission of only one or two neutrons. However, hot fusion reactions tend to produce more neutron-rich products because the actinides have the highest neutron-to-proton ratios of any element that can presently be made in macroscopic quantities; it is currently the only method to produce the superheavy elements from flerovium (element 114) onward.

Attempts to synthesize elements 119 and 120 push the limits of current technology, due to the decreasing cross sections of the production reactions and their probably short half-lives, expected to be on the order of microseconds. Heavier elements, beginning with element 121, would likely be too short-lived to be detected with current technology, decaying within a microsecond before reaching the detectors. Where this one-microsecond border of half-lives lies is not known, and this may allow the synthesis of some isotopes of elements 121 through 124, with the exact limit depending on the model chosen for predicting nuclide masses. It is also possible that element 120 is the last element reachable with current experimental techniques, and that elements from 121 onward will require new methods.

Because of the current impossibility of synthesizing elements beyond californium (Z = 98) in sufficient quantities to create a target, with einsteinium (Z = 99) targets being currently considered, the practical synthesis of elements beyond oganesson requires heavier projectiles, such as titanium-50, chromium-54, iron-58, or nickel-64. This, however, has the drawback of resulting in more symmetrical fusion reactions that are colder and less likely to succeed. For example, the reaction between ^{243}Am and ^{58}Fe is expected to have a cross section on the order of 0.5 fb, several orders of magnitude lower than measured cross sections in successful reactions; such an obstacle would make this and similar reactions infeasible for producing unbiunium.

=== Past synthesis attempt ===
The synthesis of unbiunium was first attempted in 1977 by bombarding a target of uranium-238 with copper-65 ions at the Gesellschaft für Schwerionenforschung (GSI) in Darmstadt, Germany:

^{238}_{92}U + ^{65}_{29}Cu → ^{303}_{121}Ubu* → no atoms

No atoms were identified.

== Prospects for future synthesis ==
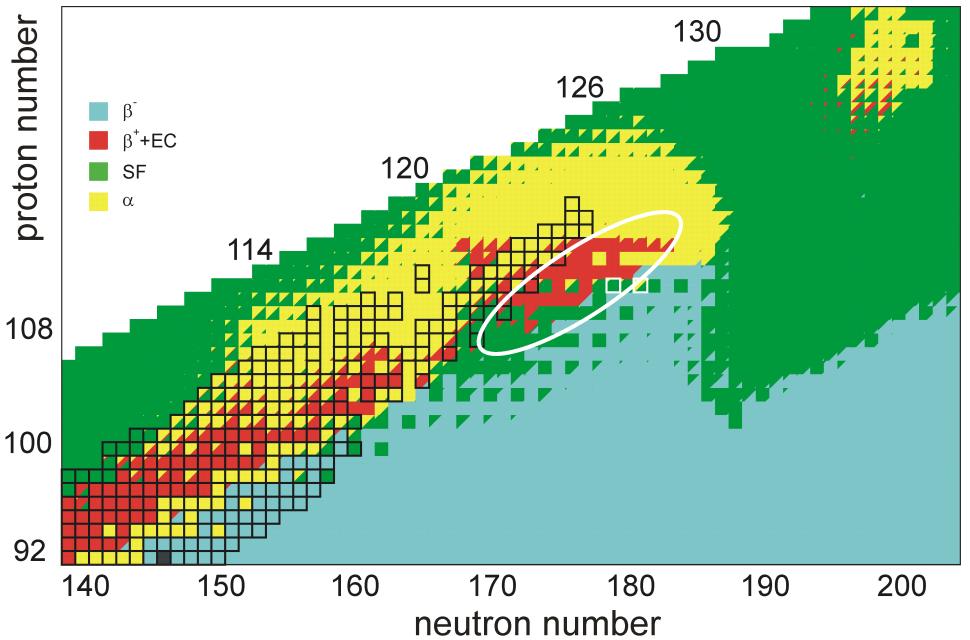
Predicted decay modes of superheavy nuclei. The line of synthesized proton-rich nuclei is expected to be broken soon after Z = 120, because of the shortening half-lives until around Z = 124, the increasing contribution of spontaneous fission instead of alpha decay from Z = 122 onward until it dominates from Z = 125, and the proton drip line around Z = 130. Beyond this is a region of slightly increased stability of second-living nuclides around Z = 124 and N = 198, but it is separated from the mainland of nuclides that may be obtained with current techniques. The white ring denotes the expected location of the island of stability; the two squares outlined in white denote ^{291}Cn and ^{293}Cn, predicted to be the longest-lived nuclides on the island with half-lives of centuries or millennia.

Currently, the beam intensities at superheavy element facilities result in about 10^{12} projectiles hitting the target per second; this cannot be increased without burning the target and the detector, and producing larger amounts of the increasingly unstable actinides needed for the target is impractical. The team at the Joint Institute for Nuclear Research (JINR) in Dubna has built a new superheavy element factory (SHE-factory) with improved detectors and the ability to work on a smaller scale, but even so, continuing beyond element 120 and perhaps 121 would be a great challenge. It is possible that the age of fusion–evaporation reactions to produce new superheavy elements is coming to an end due to the increasingly short half-lives to spontaneous fission and the looming proton drip line, so that new techniques such as nuclear transfer reactions (for example, firing uranium nuclei at each other and letting them exchange protons, potentially producing products with around 120 protons) would be required to reach the superactinides.

Because the cross sections of these fusion-evaporation reactions increase with the asymmetry of the reaction, titanium would be a better projectile than chromium for the synthesis of element 121, though this necessitates an einsteinium target. This poses severe challenges due to the significant heating and damage of the target due to the high radioactivity of einsteinium-254, but it would nonetheless probably be the most promising approach. It would require working on a smaller scale due to the lower amount of ^{254}Es that can be produced. This small-scale work could in the near future only be carried out in Dubna's SHE-factory.

The isotopes ^{299}Ubu, ^{300}Ubu, and ^{301}Ubu, that could be produced in the reaction between ^{254}Es and ^{50}Ti via the 3n and 4n channels, are expected to be the only reachable unbiunium isotopes with half-lives long enough for detection. The cross sections would nevertheless push the limits of what can currently be detected. For example, in a 2016 publication, the cross section of the aforementioned reaction between ^{254}Es and ^{50}Ti was predicted to be around 7 fb in the 4n channel, four times lower than the lowest measured cross section for a successful reaction. A 2021 calculation gives similarly low theoretical cross sections of 10 fb for the 3n channel and 0.6 fb for the 4n channel of this reaction, along with cross sections on the order of 1–10 fb for the reactions ^{249}Bk+^{54}Cr, ^{252}Es+^{50}Ti, and ^{258}Md+^{48}Ca. However, ^{252}Es and ^{258}Md cannot currently be synthesized in sufficient quantities to form target material.

Should the synthesis of unbiunium isotopes in such a reaction be successful, the resulting nuclei would decay through isotopes of ununennium that could be produced by cross-bombardments in the ^{248}Cm+^{51}V or ^{249}Bk+^{50}Ti reactions, down through known isotopes of tennessine and moscovium synthesized in the ^{249}Bk+^{48}Ca and ^{243}Am+^{48}Ca reactions. The multiplicity of excited states populated by the alpha decay of odd nuclei may however preclude clear cross-bombardment cases, as was seen in the controversial link between ^{293}Ts and ^{289}Mc. Heavier isotopes are expected to be more stable; ^{320}Ubu is predicted to be the most stable unbiunium isotope, but there is no way to synthesize it with current technology as no combination of usable target and projectile could provide enough neutrons.

The teams at RIKEN and at JINR have listed the synthesis of element 121 among their future plans. These two laboratories are best suited to these experiments as they are the only ones in the world where long beam times are accessible for reactions with such low predicted cross-sections.

=== Naming ===
Using Mendeleev's nomenclature for unnamed and undiscovered elements, unbiunium should be known as eka-actinium. Using the 1979 IUPAC recommendations, the element should be temporarily called unbiunium (symbol Ubu) until it is discovered, the discovery is confirmed, and a permanent name chosen. Although widely used in the chemical community on all levels, from chemistry classrooms to advanced textbooks, the recommendations are mostly ignored among scientists who work theoretically or experimentally on superheavy elements, who call it "element 121", with the symbol E121, (121), or 121.

== Nuclear stability and isotopes ==
The stability of nuclei decreases greatly with the increase in atomic number after curium, element 96, whose half-life is four orders of magnitude longer than that of any currently known higher-numbered element. All isotopes with an atomic number above 101 undergo radioactive decay with half-lives of less than 30 hours. No elements with atomic numbers above 82 (after lead) have stable isotopes. Nevertheless, for reasons not yet well understood, there is a slight increase of nuclear stability around atomic numbers 110–114, which leads to the appearance of what is known in nuclear physics as the "island of stability". This concept, proposed by University of California professor Glenn Seaborg and stemming from the stabilizing effects of the closed nuclear shells around Z = 114 (or possibly 120, 122, 124, or 126) and N = 184 (and possibly also N = 228), explains why superheavy elements last longer than predicted. In fact, the very existence of elements heavier than rutherfordium can be attested to shell effects and the island of stability, as spontaneous fission would rapidly cause such nuclei to disintegrate in a model neglecting such factors.

A 2016 calculation of the half-lives of the isotopes of unbiunium from ^{290}Ubu to ^{339}Ubu suggested that those from ^{290}Ubu to ^{303}Ubu would not be bound and would decay through proton emission, those from ^{304}Ubu through ^{314}Ubu would undergo alpha decay, and those from ^{315}Ubu to ^{339}Ubu would undergo spontaneous fission. Only the isotopes from ^{309}Ubu to ^{314}Ubu would have long enough alpha-decay lifetimes to be detected in laboratories, starting decay chains terminating in spontaneous fission at moscovium, tennessine, or ununennium. This would present a grave problem for experiments aiming at synthesizing isotopes of unbiunium if true, because the isotopes whose alpha decay could be observed could not be reached by any presently usable combination of target and projectile. Calculations in 2016 and 2017 by the same authors on elements 123 and 125 suggest a less bleak outcome, with alpha decay chains from the more reachable nuclides ^{300–307}Ubt passing through unbiunium and leading down to bohrium or nihonium. It has also been suggested that cluster decay might be a significant decay mode in competition with alpha decay and spontaneous fission in the region past Z = 120, which would pose yet another hurdle for experimental identification of these nuclides.

== Predicted chemistry ==
Unbiunium is predicted to be the first element of an unprecedentedly long transition series, called the superactinides in analogy to the earlier actinides. While its behavior is not likely to be very distinct from lanthanum and actinium, it is likely to pose a limit to the applicability of the periodic law; from element 121, the 5g, 6f, 7d, and 8p_{1/2} orbitals are expected to fill up together due to their very close energies, and around the elements in the late 150s and 160s, the 9s, 9p_{1/2}, and 8p_{3/2} subshells join in, so that the chemistry of the elements just beyond 121 and 122 (the last for which complete calculations have been conducted) is expected to be so similar that their position in the periodic table would be purely a formal matter.

Based on the Aufbau principle, one would expect the 5g subshell to begin filling at the unbiunium atom. However, while lanthanum does have significant 4f involvement in its chemistry, it does not yet have a 4f electron in its ground-state gas-phase configuration; a greater delay occurs for 5f, where neither actinium nor thorium atoms have a 5f electron although 5f contributes to their chemistry. It is predicted that a similar situation of delayed "radial" collapse might happen for unbiunium so that the 5g orbitals do not start filling until around element 125, even though some 5g chemical involvement may begin earlier. Because of the lack of radial nodes in the 5g orbitals, analogous to the 4f but not the 5f orbitals, the position of unbiunium in the periodic table is expected to be more akin to that of lanthanum than that of actinium among its congeners, and Pekka Pyykkö proposed to rename the superactinides as "superlanthanides" for that reason. The lack of radial nodes in the 4f orbitals contribute to their core-like behavior in the lanthanide series, unlike the more valence-like 5f orbitals in the actinides; however, the relativistic expansion and destabilization of the 5g orbitals should partially compensate for their lack of radial nodes and hence smaller extent.

Unbiunium is expected to fill the 8p_{1/2} orbital due to its relativistic stabilization, with a configuration of [Og] 8s^{2} 8p^{1}. Nevertheless, the [Og] 7d^{1} 8s^{2} configuration, which would be analogous to lanthanum and actinium, is expected to be a low-lying excited state at only 0.412 eV, and the expected [Og] 5g^{1} 8s^{2} configuration from the Madelung rule should be at 2.48 eV. The electron configurations of the ions of unbiunium are expected to be Ubu^{+}, [Og]8s^{2}; Ubu^{2+}, [Og]8s^{1}; and Ubu^{3+}, [Og]. The 8p electron of unbiunium is expected to be very loosely bound, so that its predicted ionization energy of 4.45 eV is lower than that of ununennium (4.53 eV) and all known elements except for the alkali metals from potassium to francium. A similar large reduction in ionization energy is also seen in lawrencium, another element having an anomalous s^{2}p configuration due to relativistic effects.

Despite the change in electron configuration and possibility of using the 5g shell, unbiunium is not expected to behave chemically very differently from lanthanum and actinium. A 2016 calculation on unbiunium monofluoride (UbuF) showed similarities between the valence orbitals of unbiunium in this molecule and those of actinium in actinium monofluoride (AcF); in both molecules, the highest occupied molecular orbital is expected to be non-bonding, unlike in the superficially more similar nihonium monofluoride (NhF) where it is bonding. Nihonium has the electron configuration [Rn] 5f^{14} 6d^{10} 7s^{2} 7p^{1}, with an s^{2}p valence configuration. Unbiunium may hence be somewhat like lawrencium in having an anomalous s^{2}p configuration that does not affect its chemistry: the bond dissociation energies, bond lengths, and polarizabilities of the UbuF molecule are expected to continue the trend through scandium, yttrium, lanthanum, and actinium, all of which have three valence electrons above a noble gas core. The Ubu–F bond is expected to be strong and polarized, just like for the lanthanum and actinium monofluorides.

The non-bonding electrons on unbiunium in UbuF are expected to be able to bond to extra atoms or groups, resulting in the formation of the unbiunium trihalides UbuX_{3}, analogous to LaX_{3} and AcX_{3}. Hence, the main oxidation state of unbiunium in its compounds should be +3, although the closeness of the valence subshells' energy levels may permit higher oxidation states, just like in elements 119 and 120. Relativistic effects appear to be small for the unbiunium trihalides, with UbuBr_{3} and LaBr_{3} having very similar bonding, though the former should be more ionic. The standard electrode potential for the Ubu^{3+} → Ubu couple is predicted as −2.1 V.

== Bibliography ==
- Audi, G.; Kondev, F. G.; Wang, M.; et al. (2017). "The NUBASE2016 evaluation of nuclear properties" (PDF). Chinese Physics C. 41 (3) 030001. Bibcode:2017ChPhC..41c0001A. doi:10.1088/1674-1137/41/3/030001.
- Beiser, A. (2003). Concepts of modern physics (6th ed.). McGraw-Hill. ISBN 978-0-07-244848-1. OCLC 48965418.
- Hoffman, D. C.; Ghiorso, A.; Seaborg, G. T. (2000). The Transuranium People: The Inside Story. World Scientific. ISBN 978-1-78-326244-1.
- Kragh, H. (2018). From Transuranic to Superheavy Elements: A Story of Dispute and Creation. Springer. ISBN 978-3-319-75813-8.
- Zagrebaev, V.; Karpov, A.; Greiner, W. (2013). "Future of superheavy element research: Which nuclei could be synthesized within the next few years?" (PDF). Journal of Physics: Conference Series. 420 (1). 012001. arXiv:1207.5700. Bibcode:2013JPhCS.420a2001Z. doi:10.1088/1742-6596/420/1/012001. ISSN 1742-6588. S2CID 55434734. Archived from the original (PDF) on 2015-10-03.
