= Unbiquadium =

Unbiquadium, _{124}Ubq
Theoretical element

Unbiquadium
- Pronunciation: /ˌuːnbaɪˈkwɒdiəm/ (OON-by-KWOD-ee-əm)
- Alternative names: element 124, eka-uranium

Unbiquadium in the periodic table
Hydrogen																															Helium
Lithium	Beryllium																									Boron	Carbon	Nitrogen	Oxygen	Fluorine	Neon
Sodium	Magnesium																									Aluminium	Silicon	Phosphorus	Sulfur	Chlorine	Argon
Potassium	Calcium															Scandium	Titanium	Vanadium	Chromium	Manganese	Iron	Cobalt	Nickel	Copper	Zinc	Gallium	Germanium	Arsenic	Selenium	Bromine	Krypton
Rubidium	Strontium															Yttrium	Zirconium	Niobium	Molybdenum	Technetium	Ruthenium	Rhodium	Palladium	Silver	Cadmium	Indium	Tin	Antimony	Tellurium	Iodine	Xenon
Caesium	Barium	Lanthanum	Cerium	Praseodymium	Neodymium	Promethium	Samarium	Europium	Gadolinium	Terbium	Dysprosium	Holmium	Erbium	Thulium	Ytterbium	Lutetium	Hafnium	Tantalum	Tungsten	Rhenium	Osmium	Iridium	Platinum	Gold	Mercury (element)	Thallium	Lead	Bismuth	Polonium	Astatine	Radon
Francium	Radium	Actinium	Thorium	Protactinium	Uranium	Neptunium	Plutonium	Americium	Curium	Berkelium	Californium	Einsteinium	Fermium	Mendelevium	Nobelium	Lawrencium	Rutherfordium	Dubnium	Seaborgium	Bohrium	Hassium	Meitnerium	Darmstadtium	Roentgenium	Copernicium	Nihonium	Flerovium	Moscovium	Livermorium	Tennessine	Oganesson
Ununennium	Unbinilium	Unquadtrium	Unquadquadium	Unquadpentium	Unquadhexium	Unquadseptium	Unquadoctium	Unquadennium	Unpentnilium	Unpentunium	Unpentbium	Unpenttrium	Unpentquadium	Unpentpentium	Unpenthexium	Unpentseptium	Unpentoctium	Unpentennium	Unhexnilium	Unhexunium	Unhexbium	Unhextrium	Unhexquadium	Unhexpentium	Unhexhexium	Unhexseptium	Unhexoctium	Unhexennium	Unseptnilium	Unseptunium	Unseptbium
		Unbiunium	Unbibium	Unbitrium	Unbiquadium	Unbipentium	Unbihexium	Unbiseptium	Unbioctium	Unbiennium	Untrinilium	Untriunium	Untribium	Untritrium	Untriquadium	Untripentium	Untrihexium	Untriseptium	Untrioctium	Untriennium	Unquadnilium	Unquadunium	Unquadbium
U
↑
Ubq
↓
—
unbitrium ← unbiquadium → unbipentium
- Atomic number (Z): 124
- Group: g-block groups (no number)
- Period: period 8 (theoretical, extended table)
- Block: g-block
- Electron configuration: predictions vary, see text

Physical properties
- Phase at STP: unknown

Atomic properties
- Oxidation states: common: (none) (+6)

Other properties
- CAS Number: 54500-72-0

History
- Naming: IUPAC systematic element name

Unbiquadium, also known as element 124 or eka-uranium, is a hypothetical chemical element; it has placeholder symbol Ubq and atomic number 124. Unbiquadium and Ubq are the temporary IUPAC name and symbol, respectively, until the element is discovered, confirmed, and a permanent name is decided upon. In the periodic table, unbiquadium is expected to be a g-block superactinide and the sixth element in the 8th period. Unbiquadium has attracted attention, as it may lie within the island of stability, leading to longer half-lives, especially for ^{308}Ubq which is predicted to have a magic number of neutrons (184).

Despite several searches, unbiquadium has not been synthesized, nor have any naturally occurring isotopes been found to exist. It is believed that the synthesis of unbiquadium will be far more challenging than that of lighter undiscovered elements, and nuclear instability may pose further difficulties in identifying unbiquadium, unless the island of stability has a stronger stabilizing effect than predicted in this region.

As a member of the superactinide series, unbiquadium is expected to bear some resemblance to its possible lighter congener uranium. The valence electrons of unbiquadium are expected to participate in chemical reactions fairly easily, though relativistic effects may significantly influence some of its properties; for example, the electron configuration has been calculated to differ considerably from the one predicted by the Aufbau principle.

== Introduction ==
=== Synthesis of superheavy nuclei ===
A graphic depiction of a nuclear fusion reaction. Two nuclei fuse into one, emitting a neutron. Reactions that created new elements to this moment were similar, though varying numbers of neutrons – or alternatively charged particles – may be emitted instead.

A superheavy (Note: In nuclear physics, an element is called heavy if its atomic number is high; lead (element 82) is one example of such a heavy element. The term "superheavy elements" typically refers to elements with atomic number greater than 103 (although there are other definitions, such as atomic number greater than 100 or 112; sometimes, the term is presented an equivalent to the term "transactinide", which puts an upper limit before the beginning of the hypothetical superactinide series). Terms "heavy isotopes" (of a given element) and "heavy nuclei" mean what could be understood in the common language—isotopes of high mass (for the given element) and nuclei of high mass, respectively.) atomic nucleus is created in a nuclear reaction that combines two other nuclei of unequal size (Note: In 2009, a team at the JINR led by Oganessian published results of their attempt to create hassium in a symmetric ^{136}Xe + ^{136}Xe reaction. They failed to observe a single atom in such a reaction, putting the upper limit on the cross section, the measure of probability of a nuclear reaction, as 2.5 pb. In comparison, the reaction that resulted in hassium discovery, ^{208}Pb + ^{58}Fe, had a cross section of ~20 pb (more specifically, 19^{+19}_{-11} pb), as estimated by the discoverers.) into one; roughly, the more unequal the two nuclei in terms of mass, the greater the possibility that the two react. The material made of the heavier nuclei is made into a target, which is then bombarded by the beam of lighter nuclei. Two nuclei can only fuse into one if they are close enough to each other; normally, nuclei (all positively charged) repel each other due to electrostatic repulsion. The strong interaction can overcome this repulsion but only within a very short distance from a nucleus; beam nuclei are thus greatly accelerated in order to make such repulsion insignificant compared to the velocity of the beam nucleus. The energy applied to the beam nuclei to accelerate them can cause them to reach speeds as high as one-tenth of the speed of light. However, if too much energy is applied, the beam nucleus can fall apart.

Coming close enough alone is not enough for two nuclei to fuse: when two nuclei approach each other, they usually remain together for about 10^{−20} seconds and then part ways (not necessarily in the same composition as before the reaction) rather than form a single nucleus. This happens because during the attempted formation of a single nucleus, electrostatic repulsion tears apart the nucleus that is being formed. Each pair of a target and a beam is characterized by its cross section—the probability that fusion will occur if two nuclei approach one another expressed in terms of the transverse area that the incident particle must hit in order for the fusion to occur. (Note: The amount of energy applied to the beam particle to accelerate it can also influence the value of cross section. For example, in the ^{28}_{14}Si + ^{1}_{0}n → ^{28}_{13}Al + ^{1}_{1}p reaction, cross section changes smoothly from 370 mb at 12.3 MeV to 160 mb at 18.3 MeV, with a broad peak at 13.5 MeV with the maximum value of 380 mb.) This fusion may occur as a result of the quantum effect in which nuclei can tunnel through electrostatic repulsion. If the two nuclei can stay close past that phase, multiple nuclear interactions result in redistribution of energy and an energy equilibrium.

External videos
- Visualization of unsuccessful nuclear fusion, based on calculations from the Australian National University

The resulting merger is an excited state—termed a compound nucleus—and thus it is very unstable. To reach a more stable state, the temporary merger may fission without formation of a more stable nucleus. Alternatively, the compound nucleus may eject a few neutrons, which would carry away the excitation energy; if the latter is not sufficient for a neutron expulsion, the merger would produce a gamma ray. This happens in about 10^{−16} seconds after the initial nuclear collision and results in creation of a more stable nucleus. The definition by the IUPAC/IUPAP Joint Working Party (JWP) states that a chemical element can only be recognized as discovered if a nucleus of it exists for at least 10^{−14} seconds. This value was chosen as an estimate of how long it takes a nucleus to acquire electrons and thus display its chemical properties. (Note: This figure also marks the generally accepted upper limit for lifetime of a compound nucleus.)

=== Decay and detection ===
The beam passes through the target and reaches the next chamber, the separator; if a new nucleus is produced, it is carried with this beam. In the separator, the newly produced nucleus is separated from other nuclides (that of the original beam and any other reaction products) (Note: This separation is based on the resulting heavy nuclei moving past the target more slowly than the unreacted beam nuclei. The separator contains electric and magnetic fields whose effects on a moving particle cancel out for a specific velocity of a particle. Such separation can also be aided by a time-of-flight measurement and a recoil energy measurement; a combination of the two may allow estimation of the mass of the nucleus.) and transferred to a surface-barrier detector, which stops the nucleus. The exact location of the upcoming impact on the detector is marked; also marked are its energy and the time of the arrival. The transfer takes about 10^{−6} seconds; in order to be detected, the nucleus must survive this long. The nucleus is recorded again once its decay is registered, and the location, the energy, and the time of the decay are measured.

Stability of a nucleus is provided by the strong interaction. However, its range is very short; as nuclei become larger, its influence on the outermost nucleons (protons and neutrons) weakens. At the same time, the nucleus is being destabilised by electrostatic repulsion between its protons, with a force that reduces much less with linear size. Total binding energy provided by the strong interaction increases linearly with the number of nucleons, whereas electrostatic repulsion increases with the square of the atomic number, i.e. the latter grows faster and becomes increasingly important for heavy and superheavy nuclei. Superheavy nuclei are theoretically predicted and have so far been observed to predominantly decay via decay modes that are caused by such repulsion: alpha decay and spontaneous fission. (Note: Not all decay modes are caused by electrostatic repulsion. For example, beta decay is caused by the weak interaction.) Almost all alpha emitters have over 210 nucleons, and the lightest nuclide primarily undergoing spontaneous fission has 238. In both decay modes, nuclei are inhibited from decaying by corresponding energy barriers for each mode, but they can be tunneled through.

Scheme of an apparatus for creation of superheavy elements, based on the Dubna Gas-Filled Recoil Separator set up in the Flerov Laboratory of Nuclear Reactions in JINR. The trajectory within the detector and the beam focusing apparatus changes because of a dipole magnet in the former and quadrupole magnets in the latter.

Alpha particles are commonly produced in radioactive decays because the mass of an alpha particle per nucleon is small enough to leave some energy for the alpha particle to be used as kinetic energy to leave the nucleus. Spontaneous fission is caused by electrostatic repulsion tearing the nucleus apart and produces various nuclei in different instances of identical nuclei fissioning. As the atomic number increases, spontaneous fission rapidly becomes more important: spontaneous fission partial half-lives decrease by 23 orders of magnitude from uranium (element 92) to nobelium (element 102), and by 30 orders of magnitude from thorium (element 90) to fermium (element 100). The earlier liquid drop model thus suggested that spontaneous fission would occur nearly instantly due to disappearance of the fission barrier for nuclei with about 280 nucleons. The later nuclear shell model suggested that nuclei with about 300 nucleons would form an island of stability in which nuclei will be more resistant to spontaneous fission and will primarily undergo alpha decay with longer half-lives. Subsequent discoveries suggested that the predicted island might be further than originally anticipated; they also showed that nuclei intermediate between the long-lived actinides and the predicted island are deformed, and gain additional stability from shell effects. Experiments on lighter superheavy nuclei, as well as those closer to the expected island, have shown greater than previously anticipated stability against spontaneous fission, showing the importance of shell effects on nuclei. (Note: It was already known by the 1960s that ground states of nuclei differed in energy and shape as well as that certain magic numbers of nucleons corresponded to greater stability of a nucleus. However, it was assumed that there was no nuclear structure in superheavy nuclei as they were too deformed to form one.)

Alpha decays are registered by the emitted alpha particles, and the decay products are easy to determine before the actual decay; if such a decay or a series of consecutive decays produces a known nucleus, the original product of a reaction can be easily determined. (Note: Since mass of a nucleus is not measured directly but is rather calculated from that of another nucleus, such measurement is called indirect. Direct measurements are also possible, but for the most part they have remained unavailable for superheavy nuclei. The first direct measurement of mass of a superheavy nucleus was reported in 2018 at LBNL. Mass was determined from the location of a nucleus after the transfer (the location helps determine its trajectory, which is linked to the mass-to-charge ratio of the nucleus, since the transfer was done in presence of a magnet).) (That all decays within a decay chain were indeed related to each other is established by the location of these decays, which must be in the same place.) The known nucleus can be recognized by the specific characteristics of decay it undergoes such as decay energy (or more specifically, the kinetic energy of the emitted particle). (Note: If the decay occurred in a vacuum, then since total momentum of an isolated system before and after the decay must be preserved, the daughter nucleus would also receive a small velocity. The ratio of the two velocities, and accordingly the ratio of the kinetic energies, would thus be inverse to the ratio of the two masses. The decay energy equals the sum of the known kinetic energy of the alpha particle and that of the daughter nucleus (an exact fraction of the former). The calculations hold for an experiment as well, but the difference is that the nucleus does not move after the decay because it is tied to the detector.) Spontaneous fission, however, produces various nuclei as products, so the original nuclide cannot be determined from its daughters. (Note: Spontaneous fission was discovered by Soviet physicist Georgy Flerov, a leading scientist at JINR, and thus it was a "hobbyhorse" for the facility. In contrast, the LBL scientists believed fission information was not sufficient for a claim of synthesis of an element. They believed spontaneous fission had not been studied enough to use it for identification of a new element, since there was a difficulty of establishing that a compound nucleus had only ejected neutrons and not charged particles like protons or alpha particles. They thus preferred to link new isotopes to the already known ones by successive alpha decays.)

The information available to physicists aiming to synthesize a superheavy element is thus the information collected at the detectors: location, energy, and time of arrival of a particle to the detector, and those of its decay. The physicists analyze this data and seek to conclude that it was indeed caused by a new element and could not have been caused by a different nuclide than the one claimed. Often, provided data is insufficient for a conclusion that a new element was definitely created and there is no other explanation for the observed effects; errors in interpreting data have been made. (Note: For instance, element 102 was mistakenly identified in 1957 at the Nobel Institute of Physics in Stockholm, Stockholm County, Sweden. There were no earlier definitive claims of creation of this element, and the element was assigned a name by its Swedish, American, and British discoverers, nobelium. It was later shown that the identification was incorrect. The following year, RL was unable to reproduce the Swedish results and announced instead their synthesis of the element; that claim was also disproved later. JINR insisted that they were the first to create the element and suggested a name of their own for the new element, joliotium; the Soviet name was also not accepted (JINR later referred to the naming of the element 102 as "hasty"). This name was proposed to IUPAC in a written response to their ruling on priority of discovery claims of elements, signed 29 September 1992. The name "nobelium" remained unchanged on account of its widespread usage.)

== History ==
=== Synthesis attempts ===
Because complete nuclear shells (or, equivalently, a magic number of protons or neutrons) may confer additional stability on the nuclei of superheavy elements, moving closer to the center of the island of stability, it was thought that the synthesis of element 124 or nearby elements would populate longer-lived nuclei within the island. Scientists at GANIL (Grand Accélérateur National d'Ions Lourds) attempted to measure the direct and delayed fission of compound nuclei of elements with Z = 114, 120, and 124 in order to probe shell effects in this region and to pinpoint the next spherical proton shell. In 2006, with full results published in 2008, the team provided results from a reaction involving the bombardment of a natural germanium target with uranium ions:

^{238}_{92}U + ^{nat}_{32}Ge → ^{308,310,311,312,314}Ubq* → fission

The team reported that they had been able to identify compound nuclei fissioning with half-lives > 10^{−18} s. This result suggests a strong stabilizing effect at Z = 124 and points to the next proton shell at Z > 120, not at Z = 114 as previously thought. A compound nucleus is a loose combination of nucleons that have not arranged themselves into nuclear shells yet. It has no internal structure and is held together only by the collision forces between the target and projectile nuclei. It is estimated that it requires around 10^{−14} s for the nucleons to arrange themselves into nuclear shells, at which point the compound nucleus becomes a nuclide, and this number is used by IUPAC as the minimum half-life a claimed isotope must have to potentially be recognised as being discovered. Thus, the GANIL experiments do not count as a discovery of element 124.

The fission of the compound nucleus ^{312}124 was also studied in 2006 at the tandem ALPI heavy-ion accelerator at the Laboratori Nazionali di Legnaro (Legnaro National Laboratories) in Italy:

^{232}_{90}Th + ^{80}_{34}Se → ^{312}Ubq* → fission

Similarly to previous experiments conducted at the JINR (Joint Institute for Nuclear Research), fission fragments clustered around doubly magic nuclei such as ^{132}Sn (Z = 50, N = 82), revealing a tendency for superheavy nuclei to expel such doubly magic nuclei in fission. The average number of neutrons per fission from the ^{312}124 compound nucleus (relative to lighter systems) was also found to increase, confirming that the trend of heavier nuclei emitting more neutrons during fission continues into the superheavy mass region.

=== Possible natural occurrence ===
A study in 1976 by a group of American researchers from several universities proposed that primordial superheavy elements, mainly livermorium, unbiquadium, unbihexium, and unbiseptium, could be a cause of unexplained radiation damage (particularly radiohalos) in minerals. Unbiquadium was then suggested to exist in nature with its possible congener uranium in detectable quantities, at a relative abundance of 10^{−11}. Such unbiquadium nuclei were thought to undergo alpha decay with very long half-lives down to flerovium, which would then exist in natural lead at a similar concentration (10^{−11}) and undergo spontaneous fission. This prompted many researchers to search for them in nature from 1976 to 1983. A group led by Tom Cahill, a professor at the University of California at Davis, claimed in 1976 that they had detected alpha particles and X-rays with the right energies to cause the damage observed, supporting the presence of these elements. Others claimed that none had been detected, and questioned the proposed characteristics of primordial superheavy nuclei. In particular, they cited that the magic number N = 228 necessary for enhanced stability would create a neutron-excessive nucleus in unbiquadium that would not be beta-stable. This activity was also proposed to be caused by nuclear transmutations in natural cerium, raising further ambiguity upon this claimed observation of superheavy elements.

The possible extent of primordial superheavy elements on Earth today is uncertain. Even if they are confirmed to have caused the radiation damage long ago, they might now have decayed to mere traces, or even be completely gone. It is also uncertain if such superheavy nuclei may be produced naturally at all, as spontaneous fission is expected to terminate the r-process responsible for heavy element formation between mass number 270 and 290, well before elements such as unbiquadium may be formed.

=== Naming ===
Using the 1979 IUPAC recommendations, the element should be temporarily called unbiquadium (symbol Ubq) until it is discovered, the discovery is confirmed, and a permanent name chosen. Although widely used in the chemical community on all levels, from chemistry classrooms to advanced textbooks, the recommendations are mostly ignored among scientists who work theoretically or experimentally on superheavy elements, who call it "element 124", with the symbol E124, (124), or 124. Some researchers have also referred to unbiquadium as eka-uranium, a name derived from the system Dmitri Mendeleev used to predict unknown elements, though such an extrapolation might not work for g-block elements with no known congeners and eka-uranium would instead refer to element 144 or 146 when the term is meant to denote the element directly below uranium.

== Prospects for future synthesis ==
Every element from mendelevium onward was produced in fusion-evaporation reactions, culminating in the discovery of the heaviest known element oganesson in 2002 and more recently tennessine in 2010. These reactions approached the limit of current technology; for example, the synthesis of tennessine required 22 milligrams of ^{249}Bk and an intense ^{48}Ca beam for six months. The intensity of beams in superheavy element research cannot exceed 10^{12} projectiles per second without damaging the target and detector, and producing larger quantities of increasingly rare and unstable actinide targets is impractical. Consequently, future experiments must be done at facilities such as the superheavy element factory (SHE-factory) at the Joint Institute for Nuclear Research (JINR) or RIKEN, which will allow experiments to run for longer stretches of time with increased detection capabilities and enable otherwise inaccessible reactions. Even so, it is expected to be a great challenge to continue past elements 120 or 121 given short predicted half-lives and low predicted cross sections.

The production of new superheavy elements will require projectiles heavier than ^{48}Ca, which was successfully used in the discovery of elements 114–118, though this necessitates more symmetric reactions which are less favorable. Hence, it is likely that the reactions between ^{58}Fe and a ^{249}Cf or ^{251}Cf target are most promising. Studies on the fission of various superheavy compound nuclei have found that the dynamics of ^{48}Ca- and ^{58}Fe-induced reactions are similar, suggesting that ^{58}Fe projectiles may be viable in producing superheavy nuclei up to Z = 124 or possibly 125. It is also possible that a reaction with ^{251}Cf will produce the compound nucleus ^{309}Ubq* with 185 neutrons, immediately above the N = 184 shell closure. For this reason, the compound nucleus is predicted to have relatively high survival probability and low neutron separation energy, leading to the 1n–3n channels and isotopes ^{306–308}Ubq with a relatively high cross section. These dynamics are highly speculative, as the cross section may be far lower should trends in the production of elements 112–118 continue or the fission barriers be lower than expected, regardless of shell effects, leading to decreased stability against spontaneous fission (which is of growing importance). Nonetheless, the prospect of reaching the N = 184 shell on the proton-rich side of the chart of nuclides by increasing proton number has long been considered; already in 1970, Soviet nuclear physicist Georgy Flyorov suggested bombarding a plutonium target with zinc projectiles to produce isotopes of element 124 at the N = 184 shell.

== Predicted properties ==
=== Nuclear stability and isotopes ===
This nuclear chart used by the Japan Atomic Energy Agency predicts the decay modes of nuclei up to Z = 149 and N = 256. For unbiquadium (Z = 124), there are predicted regions of increased stability around N = 184 and N = 228, though many intermediate isotopes are theoretically susceptible to spontaneous fission with half-lives shorter than 1 nanosecond.

Unbiquadium is of interest to researchers because of its possible location near the center of an island of stability, a theoretical region comprising longer-lived superheavy nuclei. Such an island of stability was first proposed by University of California professor Glenn Seaborg, specifically predicting a region of stability centered at element 126 (unbihexium) and encompassing nearby elements, including unbiquadium, with half-lives possibly as long as 10^{9} years. In known elements, the stability of nuclei decreases greatly with the increase in atomic number after uranium, the heaviest primordial element, so that all observed isotopes with an atomic number above 101 decay radioactively with a half-life under a day. Nevertheless, there is a slight increase in nuclear stability in nuclides around atomic numbers 110–114, which suggests the presence of an island of stability. This is attributed to the possible closure of nuclear shells in the superheavy mass region, with stabilizing effects that may lead to half-lives on the order of years or longer for some as-yet undiscovered isotopes of these elements. While still unproven, the existence of superheavy elements as heavy as oganesson provides evidence of such stabilizing effects, as elements with an atomic number greater than approximately 104 are extremely unstable in models neglecting magic numbers.

In this region of the periodic table, N = 184 and N = 228 have been proposed as closed neutron shells, and various atomic numbers have been proposed as closed proton shells, including Z = 124. (Note: Atomic numbers 114, 120, 122, and 126 have also been proposed as closed proton shells in different models.) The island of stability is characterized by longer half-lives of nuclei located near these magic numbers, though the extent of stabilizing effects is uncertain due to predictions of weakening of the proton shell closures and possible loss of double magicity. More recent research predicts the island of stability to instead be centered at beta-stable copernicium isotopes ^{291}Cn and ^{293}Cn, which would place unbiquadium well above the island and result in short half-lives regardless of shell effects. A 2016 study on the decay properties of unbiquadium isotopes ^{284–339}Ubq predicts that ^{284–304}Ubq lie outside the proton drip line and thus may be proton emitters, ^{305–323}Ubq may undergo alpha decay, with some chains terminating as far as flerovium, and heavier isotopes will decay by spontaneous fission. These results, as well as those from a quantum-tunneling model, predict no half-lives over a millisecond for isotopes lighter than ^{319}Ubq, as well as especially short half-lives for ^{309–314}Ubq in the sub-microsecond range due to destabilizing effects immediately above the shell at N = 184. This renders the identification of many unbiquadium isotopes nearly impossible with current technology, as detectors cannot distinguish rapid successive signals from alpha decays in a time period shorter than microseconds. (Note: While such nuclei may be synthesized and a series of decay signals may be registered, decays faster than one microsecond may pile up with subsequent signals and thus be indistinguishable, especially when multiple uncharacterized nuclei may be formed and emit a series of similar alpha particles. The main difficulty is thus attributing the decays to the correct parent nucleus, as a superheavy atom that decays before reaching the detector will not be registered at all.)

Increasingly short spontaneous fission half-lives of superheavy nuclei and the possible domination of fission over alpha decay will also probably determine the stability of unbiquadium isotopes. While some fission half-lives constituting a "sea of instability" may be on the order of 10^{−18} s as a consequence of very low fission barriers, especially in even–even nuclei due to pairing effects, stabilizing effects at N = 184 and N = 228 may allow the existence of relatively long-lived isotopes. For N = 184, fission half-lives may increase, though alpha half-lives are still expected to be on the order of microseconds or less, despite the shell closure at ^{308}Ubq. It is also possible that the island of stability may shift to the N = 198 region, where total half-lives may be on the order of seconds, in contrast to neighboring isotopes that would undergo fission in less than a microsecond. In the neutron-rich region around N = 228, alpha half-lives are also predicted to increase with increasing neutron number, meaning that the stability of such nuclei would primarily depend on the location of the beta-stability line and resistance to fission. One early calculation by P. Moller, a physicist at Los Alamos National Laboratory, estimates the total half-life of ^{352}Ubq (with N = 228) to be around 67 seconds, and possibly the longest in the N = 228 region.

=== Chemical ===
Unbiquadium is the fourth member of the superactinide series and should be similar to uranium: both elements have six valence electrons over a noble gas core. In the superactinide series, the Aufbau principle is expected to break down due to relativistic effects, and an overlap of the 5g, 6f, 7d, and 8p orbitals is expected. The ground state electron configuration of unbiquadium is thus predicted to be [Og] 6f^{3} 8s^{2} 8p^{1} or 6f^{2} 8s^{2} 8p^{2}, in contrast to [Og] 5g^{4} 8s^{2} derived from Aufbau. This predicted overlap of orbitals and uncertainty in order of filling, especially for f and g orbitals, renders predictions of chemical and atomic properties of these elements very difficult.

One predicted oxidation state of unbiquadium is +6, which would exist in the halides UbqX_{6} (X = a halogen), analogous to the known +6 oxidation state in uranium. Like the other early superactinides, the binding energies of unbiquadium's valence electrons are predicted to be small enough that all six should easily participate in chemical reactions. The predicted electron configuration of the Ubq^{5+} ion is [Og] 6f^{1}.

== Bibliography ==
- Audi, G.; Kondev, F. G.; Wang, M.; et al. (2017). "The NUBASE2016 evaluation of nuclear properties" (PDF). Chinese Physics C. 41 (3) 030001. Bibcode:2017ChPhC..41c0001A. doi:10.1088/1674-1137/41/3/030001.
- Beiser, A. (2003). Concepts of modern physics (6th ed.). McGraw-Hill. ISBN 978-0-07-244848-1. OCLC 48965418.
- Hoffman, D. C.; Ghiorso, A.; Seaborg, G. T. (2000). The Transuranium People: The Inside Story. World Scientific. ISBN 978-1-78-326244-1.
- Kragh, H. (2018). From Transuranic to Superheavy Elements: A Story of Dispute and Creation. Springer. ISBN 978-3-319-75813-8.
- Zagrebaev, V.; Karpov, A.; Greiner, W. (2013). "Future of superheavy element research: Which nuclei could be synthesized within the next few years?" (PDF). Journal of Physics: Conference Series. 420 (1). 012001. arXiv:1207.5700. Bibcode:2013JPhCS.420a2001Z. doi:10.1088/1742-6596/420/1/012001. ISSN 1742-6588. S2CID 55434734. Archived from the original (PDF) on 2015-10-03.
