= Uranium hexaoxide =

Postulated chemical compound

Identifiers
3D model (JSmol)	Interactive image
- InChI: InChI=1S/6O.U Key: LOXQZMJDQSSDDQ-UHFFFAOYSA-N
- SMILES: O=[U](=O)(=O)(=O)(=O)=O

Properties
Chemical formula	UO_{6}
Molar mass	334.0288 g/mol
- Except where otherwise noted, data are given for materials in their standard state (at 25 °C [77 °F], 100 kPa). Infobox references

Uranium hexaoxide is an unusual, theoretically possible compound of uranium in which the uranium atom would be attached to six oxygen atoms. Some sources claimed it would be an unprecedented example of an element in the +12 oxidation state; for comparison, the highest known oxidation state is +9 for iridium in the cation IrO^{+}_{4}. This oxidation state assignment requires participation of 6p electrons of uranium as valence electrons. This assertion was disputed by a later paper, which formulates the octahedral species as O(–I) and U(VI), although it does acknowledge that the question of valence shell expansion of uranium and other actinoids is complex and that the "semi-core" 6p electrons of uranium are involved to a non-negligible extent in the bonding of structures such as octahedral UO_{6}.

== Structure ==
Uranium hexaoxide is predicted to have octahedral symmetry; however, other forms have been studied. In the ^{1}O_{h} the oxygen atoms are oxide ions (O^{2−}). In the ^{1}D_{3} form there are three peroxide ions (O^{2−}_{2}). The ^{3}D_{2h} form has two oxo oxygens and two pairs of superoxide (O^{−}_{2}). The octahedral form was calculated to be less energetically favorable than the other geometries though still predicted to be a local energy minimum.
