= Island of stability =

Prediction in nuclear physics

A diagram by the Joint Institute for Nuclear Research showing the measured (boxed) and predicted half-lives of superheavy nuclides, ordered by number of protons and neutrons. The expected location of the island of stability around Z = 112 (copernicium) is circled.

In nuclear physics, the island of stability is a predicted set of isotopes of superheavy elements that may have considerably longer half-lives than known isotopes of these elements. It is predicted to appear as an "island" in the chart of nuclides, separated from known stable and long-lived primordial radionuclides. Its theoretical existence is attributed to stabilizing effects of predicted "magic numbers" of protons and neutrons in the superheavy mass region.

Several predictions have been made regarding the exact location of the island of stability, though it is generally thought to center near copernicium and flerovium isotopes in the vicinity of the predicted closed neutron shell at N = 184. These models strongly suggest that the closed shell will confer further stability towards fission and alpha decay. While these effects are expected to be greatest near atomic number Z = 114 (flerovium) and N = 184, the region of increased stability is expected to encompass several neighboring elements, and there may also be additional islands of stability around heavier nuclei that are doubly magic (having magic numbers of both protons and neutrons). Estimates of the stability of the nuclides within the island are usually around a half-life of minutes or days; some optimists propose half-lives on the order of millions of years.

Although the nuclear shell model predicting magic numbers has existed since the 1940s, the existence of long-lived superheavy nuclides has not been definitively demonstrated. Like the rest of the superheavy elements, the nuclides within the island of stability have never been found in nature; thus, they must be created artificially in a nuclear reaction to be studied. Scientists have not found a way to carry out such a reaction, for it is likely that new types of reactions will be needed to populate nuclei near the center of the island. Nevertheless, the successful synthesis of superheavy elements up to Z = 118 (oganesson) with up to 177 neutrons demonstrates a slight stabilizing effect around elements 110 to 114 that may continue in heavier isotopes, consistent with the existence of the island of stability.

== Introduction ==
=== Nuclide stability ===
Chart of half-lives of known nuclides

The composition of a nuclide (atomic nucleus) is defined by the number of protons Z and the number of neutrons N, which sum to mass number A. Proton number Z, also named the atomic number, determines the position of an element in the periodic table. The approximately 3300 known nuclides are commonly represented in a chart with Z and N for its axes and the half-life for radioactive decay indicated for each unstable nuclide (see figure). As of 2019, 251 nuclides are observed to be stable (having never been observed to decay); generally, as the number of protons increases, stable nuclei have a higher neutron–proton ratio (more neutrons per proton). The last element in the periodic table that has a stable isotope is lead (Z = 82), (Note: The heaviest stable element was believed to be bismuth (atomic number 83) until 2003, when its only stable isotope, ^{209}Bi, was observed to undergo alpha decay.) (Note: It is theoretically possible for other observationally stable nuclides to decay, though their predicted half-lives are so long that this process has never been observed.) with stability (i.e., half-lives of the longest-lived isotopes) generally decreasing in heavier elements, (Note: A region of increased stability encompasses thorium (Z = 90) and uranium (Z = 92) whose half-lives are comparable to the age of the Earth. Elements intermediate between bismuth and thorium have shorter half-lives, and heavier nuclei beyond uranium become more unstable with increasing atomic number.) especially beyond curium (Z = 96). The half-lives of nuclei also decrease when there is a lopsided neutron–proton ratio, such that the resulting nuclei have too few or too many neutrons to be stable.

The stability of a nucleus is determined by its binding energy, higher binding energy conferring greater stability. The binding energy per nucleon increases with atomic number to a broad plateau around A = 60, then declines. If a nucleus can be split into two parts that have a lower total energy (a consequence of the mass defect resulting from greater binding energy), it is unstable. The nucleus can hold together for a finite time because there is a potential barrier opposing the split, but this barrier can be crossed by quantum tunneling. The lower the barrier and the masses of the fragments, the greater the probability per unit time of a split.

Protons in a nucleus are bound together by the strong force, which counterbalances the Coulomb repulsion between positively charged protons. In heavier nuclei, larger numbers of uncharged neutrons are needed to reduce repulsion and confer additional stability. Even so, as physicists started to synthesize elements that are not found in nature, they found the stability decreased as the nuclei became heavier. Thus, they speculated that the periodic table might come to an end. The discoverers of plutonium (element 94) considered naming it "ultimium", thinking it was the last. Following the discoveries of heavier elements, of which some decayed in microseconds, it then seemed that instability with respect to spontaneous fission would limit the existence of heavier elements. In 1939, an upper limit of potential element synthesis was estimated around element 104, and following the first discoveries of transactinide elements in the early 1960s, this upper limit prediction was extended to element 108.

=== Magic numbers ===
Diagram showing energy levels of known and predicted proton shells (left and right show two different models). The gaps at Z = 82, 114, 120, and 126 correspond to shell closures, which have particularly stable configurations and thus result in more stable nuclei.

As early as 1914, the possible existence of superheavy elements with atomic numbers well beyond that of uranium—then the heaviest known element—was suggested, when German physicist Richard Swinne proposed that superheavy elements around Z = 108 were a source of radiation in cosmic rays. Although he did not make any definitive observations, he hypothesized in 1931 that transuranium elements around Z = 100 or Z = 108 may be relatively long-lived and possibly exist in nature. In 1955, American physicist John Archibald Wheeler also proposed the existence of these elements; he is credited with the first usage of the term "superheavy element" in a 1958 paper published with Frederick Werner. This idea did not attract wide interest until a decade later, after improvements in the nuclear shell model. In this model, the atomic nucleus is built up in "shells", analogous to electron shells in atoms. Independently of each other, neutrons and protons have energy levels that are normally close together, but after a given shell is filled, it takes substantially more energy to start filling the next. Thus, the binding energy per nucleon reaches a local maximum and nuclei with filled shells are more stable than those without. This theory of a nuclear shell model originates in the 1930s, but it was not until 1949 that German physicists Maria Goeppert Mayer and Johannes Hans Daniel Jensen et al. independently devised the correct formulation.

The numbers of nucleons for which shells are filled are called magic numbers. Magic numbers of 2, 8, 20, 28, 50, 82 and 126 have been observed for neutrons, and the next number is predicted to be 184. Protons share the first six of these magic numbers, and 126 has been predicted as a magic proton number since the 1940s. Nuclides with a magic number of each—such as ^{16}O (Z = 8, N = 8), ^{132}Sn (Z = 50, N = 82), and ^{208}Pb (Z = 82, N = 126)—are referred to as "doubly magic" and are more stable than nearby nuclides as a result of greater binding energies.

In the late 1960s, more sophisticated shell models were formulated by American physicist William Myers and Polish physicist Władysław Świątecki, and independently by German physicist Heiner Meldner (1939–2019). With these models, taking into account Coulomb repulsion, Meldner predicted that the next proton magic number may be 114 instead of 126. Myers and Świątecki appear to have coined the term "island of stability", and American chemist Glenn Seaborg, later a discoverer of many of the superheavy elements, quickly adopted the term and promoted it. Myers and Świątecki also proposed that some superheavy nuclei would be longer-lived as a consequence of higher fission barriers. Further improvements in the nuclear shell model by Soviet physicist Vilen Strutinsky led to the emergence of the macroscopic–microscopic method, a nuclear mass model that takes into consideration both smooth trends characteristic of the liquid-drop model and local fluctuations such as shell effects. This approach enabled Swedish physicist Sven Nilsson et al., as well as other groups, to make the first detailed calculations of the stability of nuclei within the island. With the emergence of this model, Strutinsky, Nilsson, and other groups argued for the existence of the doubly magic nuclide ^{298}_{114}Fl (Z = 114, N = 184), rather than ^{310}Ubh (Z = 126, N = 184) which was predicted to be doubly magic as early as 1957. Subsequently, estimates of the proton magic number have ranged from 114 to 126, and there is still no consensus.

== Discoveries ==
Most stable isotopes of superheavy elements (Z ≥ 104)
Element	Atomic number	Most stable isotope	Half-life (Note: Different sources give different values for half-lives; the most recently published values in the literature and NUBASE are both listed for reference.)	
Element	Atomic number	Most stable isotope	Publications	NUBASE 2020
Rutherfordium	104	^{267}Rf	48 min	2.5 h
Dubnium	105	^{268}Db	16 h	1.2 d
Seaborgium	106	^{269}Sg	14 min	5 min
Bohrium	107	^{270}Bh (Note: The unconfirmed ^{278}Bh may have a longer half-life of 11.5 minutes.)	2.4 min	3.8 min
Hassium	108	^{269}Hs	9.7 s	16 s
Meitnerium	109	^{278}Mt (Note: For elements 109–118, the longest-lived known isotope is always the heaviest discovered thus far. This makes it seem likely that there are longer-lived undiscovered isotopes among the even heavier ones.) (Note: The unconfirmed ^{282}Mt may have a longer half-life of 1.1 minutes.)	4.5 s	6 s
Darmstadtium	110	^{281}Ds	12.7 s	14 s
Roentgenium	111	^{282}Rg (Note: The unconfirmed ^{286}Rg may have a longer half-life of 10.7 minutes.)	1.7 min	2.2 min
Copernicium	112	^{285}Cn	28 s	30 s
Nihonium	113	^{286}Nh	9.5 s	12 s
Flerovium	114	^{289}Fl (Note: The unconfirmed ^{290}Fl may have a longer half-life of 19 seconds.)	1.9 s	2.1 s
Moscovium	115	^{290}Mc	650 ms	840 ms
Livermorium	116	^{293}Lv	57 ms	70 ms
Tennessine	117	^{294}Ts	51 ms	70 ms
Oganesson	118	^{294}Og	690 μs	700 μs

Interest in a possible island of stability grew throughout the 1960s, as some calculations suggested that it might contain nuclides with half-lives of billions of years. They were also predicted to be especially stable against spontaneous fission in spite of their high atomic mass. It was thought that if such elements exist and are sufficiently long-lived, there may be several novel applications as a consequence of their nuclear and chemical properties. These include use in particle accelerators as neutron sources, in nuclear weapons as a consequence of their predicted low critical masses and high number of neutrons emitted per fission, and as nuclear fuel to power space missions. These speculations led many researchers to conduct searches for superheavy elements in the 1960s and 1970s, both in nature and through nucleosynthesis in particle accelerators.

During the 1970s, many searches for long-lived superheavy nuclei were conducted. Experiments aimed at synthesizing elements ranging in atomic number from 110 to 127 were conducted at laboratories around the world. These elements were sought in fusion-evaporation reactions, in which a heavy target made of one nuclide is irradiated by accelerated ions of another in a cyclotron, and new nuclides are produced after these nuclei fuse and the resulting excited system releases energy by evaporating several particles (usually protons, neutrons, or alpha particles). These reactions are divided into "cold" and "hot" fusion, which respectively create systems with lower and higher excitation energies; this affects the yield of the reaction. For example, the reaction between ^{248}Cm and ^{40}Ar was expected to yield isotopes of element 114, and that between ^{232}Th and ^{84}Kr was expected to yield isotopes of element 126. None of these attempts were successful, indicating that such experiments may have been insufficiently sensitive if reaction cross sections were low—resulting in lower yields—or that any nuclei reachable via such fusion-evaporation reactions might be too short-lived for detection. (Note: While such nuclei may be synthesized and a series of decay signals may be registered, decays faster than one microsecond may pile up with subsequent signals and thus be indistinguishable, especially when multiple uncharacterized nuclei may be formed and emit a series of similar alpha particles. The main difficulty is thus attributing the decays to the correct parent nucleus, as a superheavy atom that decays before reaching the detector will not be registered at all.) Subsequent successful experiments reveal that half-lives and cross sections indeed decrease with increasing atomic number, resulting in the synthesis of only a few short-lived atoms of the heaviest elements in each experiment; as of 2022, the highest reported cross section for a superheavy nuclide near the island of stability is for ^{288}Mc in the reaction between ^{243}Am and ^{48}Ca.

Similar searches in nature were also unsuccessful, suggesting that if superheavy elements do exist in nature, their abundance is less than 10^{−14} moles of superheavy elements per mole of ore. Despite these unsuccessful attempts to observe long-lived superheavy nuclei, new superheavy elements were synthesized every few years in laboratories through light-ion bombardment and cold fusion (Note: This is a distinct concept from hypothetical fusion near room temperature (cold fusion); it instead refers to fusion reactions with lower excitation energy.) reactions; rutherfordium, the first transactinide, was discovered in 1969, and copernicium, eight protons closer to the island of stability predicted at Z = 114, was reached by 1996. Even though the half-lives of these nuclei are very short (on the order of seconds), the very existence of elements heavier than rutherfordium is indicative of stabilizing effects thought to be caused by closed shells; a model not considering such effects would forbid the existence of these elements due to rapid spontaneous fission.

Flerovium, with the expected magic 114 protons, was first synthesized in 1998 at the Joint Institute for Nuclear Research in Dubna, Russia, by a group of physicists led by Yuri Oganessian. A single atom of element 114 was detected, with a lifetime of 30.4 seconds, and its decay products had half-lives measurable in minutes. Because the produced nuclei underwent alpha decay rather than fission, and the half-lives were several orders of magnitude longer than those previously predicted (Note: Oganessian stated that element 114 would have a half-life on the order of 10^{−19} s in the absence of stabilizing effects in the vicinity of the theorized island.) or observed for superheavy elements, this event was seen as a "textbook example" of a decay chain characteristic of the island of stability, providing strong evidence for the existence of the island of stability in this region. Even though the original 1998 chain was not observed again, and its assignment remains uncertain, further successful experiments in the next two decades led to the discovery of all elements up to oganesson, whose half-lives were found to exceed initially predicted values; these decay properties further support the presence of the island of stability. However, a 2021 study on the decay chains of flerovium isotopes suggests that there is no strong stabilizing effect from Z = 114 in the region of known nuclei (N = 174), and that extra stability would be predominantly a consequence of the neutron shell closure. Although known nuclei still fall several neutrons short of N = 184 where maximum stability is expected (the most neutron-rich confirmed nuclei, ^{293}Lv and ^{294}Ts, only reach N = 177), and the exact location of the center of the island remains unknown, the trend of increasing stability closer to N = 184 has been demonstrated. For example, the isotope ^{285}Cn, with eight more neutrons than ^{277}Cn, has a half-life almost five orders of magnitude longer. This trend is expected to continue into unknown heavier isotopes in the vicinity of the shell closure.

=== Deformed nuclei ===
A summary of observed decay chains in even-Z superheavy elements, including tentative assignments in chains 3, 5, and 8. According to another analysis, chain 3 (starting at element 120) is not a real decay chain, but is rather a random sequence of events. There is a general trend of increasing stability for isotopes with a greater neutron excess (N − Z, the difference in the number of protons and neutrons), especially in elements 110, 112, and 114, which strongly suggests that the center of the island of stability lies among even heavier isotopes.

Though nuclei within the island of stability around N = 184 are predicted to be spherical, studies from the early 1990s—beginning with Polish physicists Zygmunt Patyk and Adam Sobiczewski in 1991—suggest that some superheavy elements do not have perfectly spherical nuclei. A change in the shape of the nucleus changes the position of neutrons and protons in the shell. Research indicates that large nuclei farther from spherical magic numbers are deformed, causing magic numbers to shift or new magic numbers to appear. Current theoretical investigation indicates that in the region Z = 106–108 and N ≈ 160–164, nuclei may be more resistant to fission as a consequence of shell effects for deformed nuclei; thus, such superheavy nuclei would only undergo alpha decay. Hassium-270 is now believed to be a doubly magic deformed nucleus, with deformed magic numbers Z = 108 and N = 162. It has a half-life of 9 seconds. This is consistent with models that take into account the deformed nature of nuclei intermediate between the actinides and island of stability near N = 184, in which a stability "peninsula" emerges at deformed magic numbers Z = 108 and N = 162. Determination of the decay properties of neighboring hassium and seaborgium isotopes near N = 162 provides further strong evidence for this region of relative stability in deformed nuclei. This also strongly suggests that the island of stability (for spherical nuclei) is not completely isolated from the region of stable nuclei, but rather that both regions are instead linked through an isthmus of relatively stable deformed nuclei.

== Predicted decay properties ==
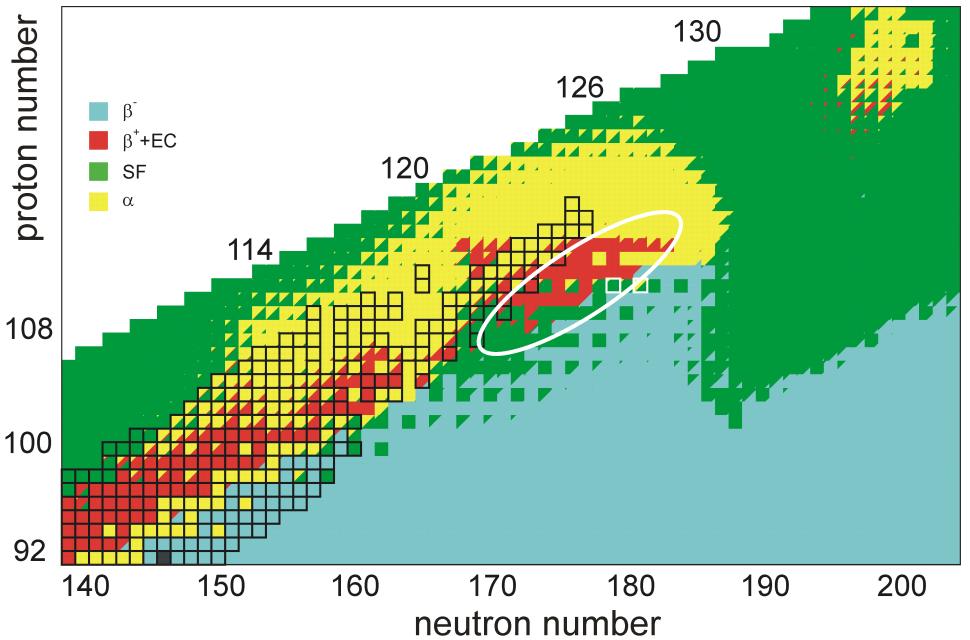
A diagram depicting predicted decay modes of superheavy nuclei, with observed nuclei given black outlines. The most neutron-deficient nuclei as well as those immediately beyond the shell closure at N = 184 are predicted to predominantly undergo spontaneous fission (SF), whereas alpha decay (α) may dominate in neutron-deficient nuclei closer to the island, and significant beta decay (β) or electron capture (EC) branches may appear closest to the center of the island around ^{291}Cn and ^{293}Cn.

The half-lives of nuclei in the island of stability itself are unknown since none of the nuclides that would be "on the island" have been observed. Many physicists believe that the half-lives of these nuclei are relatively short, on the order of minutes or days. Some theoretical calculations indicate that their half-lives may be long, on the order of 100 years, or possibly as long as 10^{9} years.

The shell closure at N = 184 is predicted to result in longer partial half-lives for alpha decay and spontaneous fission. It is believed that the shell closure will result in higher fission barriers for nuclei around ^{298}Fl, strongly hindering fission and perhaps resulting in fission half-lives 30 orders of magnitude greater than those of nuclei unaffected by the shell closure. For example, the neutron-deficient isotope ^{284}Fl (with N = 170) undergoes fission with a half-life of 2.5 milliseconds, and is thought to be one of the most neutron-deficient nuclides with increased stability in the vicinity of the N = 184 shell closure. Beyond this point, some undiscovered isotopes are predicted to undergo fission with still shorter half-lives, limiting the existence (Note: The International Union of Pure and Applied Chemistry (IUPAC) defines the limit of nuclear existence at a half-life of 10^{−14} seconds; this is approximately the time required for nucleons to arrange themselves into nuclear shells and thus form a nuclide.) and possible observation of superheavy nuclei far from the island of stability (namely for N < 170 as well as for Z > 120 and N > 184). These nuclei may undergo alpha decay or spontaneous fission in microseconds or less, with some fission half-lives estimated on the order of 10^{−20} seconds in the absence of fission barriers. In contrast, ^{298}Fl (predicted to lie within the region of maximum shell effects) may have a much longer spontaneous fission half-life, possibly on the order of 10^{19} years.

In the center of the island, there may be competition between alpha decay and spontaneous fission, though the exact ratio is model-dependent. The alpha decay half-lives of 1700 nuclei with 100 ≤ Z ≤ 130 have been calculated in a quantum tunneling model with both experimental and theoretical alpha decay Q-values, and are in agreement with observed half-lives for some of the heaviest isotopes.

The longest-lived nuclides are also predicted to lie on the beta-stability line, for beta decay is predicted to compete with the other decay modes near the predicted center of the island, especially for isotopes of elements 111–115. Unlike other decay modes predicted for these nuclides, beta decay does not change the mass number. Instead, a neutron is converted into a proton or vice versa, producing an adjacent isobar closer to the center of stability (the isobar with the lowest mass excess). For example, significant beta decay branches may exist in nuclides such as ^{291}Fl and ^{291}Nh; these nuclides have only a few more neutrons than known nuclides, and might decay via a "narrow pathway" towards the center of the island of stability. The possible role of beta decay is highly uncertain, as some isotopes of these elements (such as ^{290}Fl and ^{293}Mc) are predicted to have shorter partial half-lives for alpha decay. Beta decay would reduce competition and would result in alpha decay remaining the dominant decay channel, unless additional stability towards alpha decay exists in superdeformed isomers of these nuclides.

This chart of predicted decay modes, derived from theoretical research of the Japan Atomic Energy Agency, predicts the center of the island of stability around ^{294}Ds; it would be the longest-lived of several relatively long-lived nuclides primarily undergoing alpha decay (circled). This is the region where the beta-stability line crosses the region stabilized by the shell closure at N = 184. To the left and right, half-lives decrease as fission becomes the dominant decay mode, consistent with other models.

Considering all decay modes, various models indicate a shift of the center of the island (i.e., the longest-living nuclide) from ^{298}Fl to a lower atomic number, and competition between alpha decay and spontaneous fission in these nuclides; these include 100-year half-lives for ^{291}Cn and ^{293}Cn, a 1000-year half-life for ^{296}Cn, a 300-year half-life for ^{294}Ds, and a 3500-year half-life for ^{293}Ds, with ^{294}Ds and ^{296}Cn exactly at the N = 184 shell closure. It has also been posited that this region of enhanced stability for elements with 112 ≤ Z ≤ 118 may instead be a consequence of nuclear deformation, and that the true center of the island of stability for spherical superheavy nuclei lies around ^{306}Ubb (Z = 122, N = 184). This model defines the island of stability as the region with the greatest resistance to fission rather than the longest total half-lives; the nuclide ^{306}Ubb is still predicted to have a short half-life with respect to alpha decay. The island of stability for spherical nuclei may also be a "coral reef" (i.e., a broad region of increased stability without a clear "peak") around N = 184 and 114 ≤ Z ≤ 120, with half-lives rapidly decreasing at higher atomic number, due to combined effects from proton and neutron shell closures.

Another potentially significant decay mode for the heaviest superheavy elements was proposed to be cluster decay by Romanian physicists Dorin N. Poenaru and Radu A. Gherghescu and German physicist Walter Greiner. Its branching ratio relative to alpha decay is expected to increase with atomic number such that it may compete with alpha decay around Z = 120, and perhaps become the dominant decay mode for heavier nuclides around Z = 124. As such, it is expected to play a larger role beyond the center of the island of stability (though still influenced by shell effects), unless the center of the island lies at a higher atomic number than predicted.

== Possible natural occurrence ==
Even though half-lives of hundreds or thousands of years would be relatively long for superheavy elements, they are far too short for any such nuclides to exist primordially on Earth. Additionally, instability of nuclei intermediate between primordial actinides (^{232}Th, ^{235}U, and ^{238}U) and the island of stability may inhibit production of nuclei within the island in r-process nucleosynthesis. Various models suggest that spontaneous fission will be the dominant decay mode of nuclei with A > 280, and that neutron-induced or beta-delayed fission—respectively neutron capture and beta decay immediately followed by fission—will become the primary reaction channels. As a result, beta decay towards the island of stability may only occur within a very narrow path or may be entirely blocked by fission, thus precluding the synthesis of nuclides within the island. The non-observation of superheavy nuclides such as ^{292}Hs and ^{298}Fl in nature is thought to be a consequence of a low yield in the r-process resulting from this mechanism, as well as half-lives too short to allow measurable quantities to persist in nature. (Note: The observation of long-lived isotopes of roentgenium (with A = 261, 265) and unbibium (A = 292) in nature has been claimed by Israeli physicist Amnon Marinov et al., though evaluations of the technique used and subsequent unsuccessful searches cast considerable doubt on these results.) Various studies utilizing accelerator mass spectroscopy and crystal scintillators have reported upper limits of the natural abundance of such long-lived superheavy nuclei on the order of 10^{−14} relative to their stable homologs.

Despite these obstacles to their synthesis, a 2013 study published by a group of Russian physicists led by Valeriy Zagrebaev proposes that the longest-lived copernicium isotopes may occur at an abundance of 10^{−12} relative to lead, whereby they may be detectable in cosmic rays. Similarly, in a 2013 experiment, a group of Russian physicists led by Aleksandr Bagulya reported the possible observation of three cosmogenic superheavy nuclei in olivine crystals in meteorites. The atomic number of these nuclei was estimated to be between 105 and 130, with one nucleus likely constrained between 113 and 129, and their lifetimes were estimated to be at least 3,000 years. Although this observation has yet to be confirmed in independent studies, it strongly suggests the existence of the island of stability, and is consistent with theoretical calculations of half-lives of these nuclides.

The decay of heavy, long-lived elements in the island of stability is a proposed explanation for the unusual presence of the short-lived radioactive isotopes observed in Przybylski's Star.

== Synthesis and difficulties ==
Three-dimensional rendering of the island of stability around N = 178 and Z = 112

The manufacture of nuclei on the island of stability proves to be very difficult because the nuclei available as starting materials do not deliver the necessary sum of neutrons. Radioactive ion beams (such as ^{44}S) in combination with actinide targets (such as ^{248}Cm) may allow the production of more neutron rich nuclei nearer to the center of the island of stability, though such beams are not currently available in the required intensities to conduct such experiments. Several heavier isotopes such as ^{250}Cm and ^{254}Es may still be usable as targets, allowing the production of isotopes with one or two more neutrons than known isotopes, though the production of several milligrams of these rare isotopes to create a target is difficult. It may also be possible to probe alternative reaction channels in the same ^{48}Ca-induced fusion-evaporation reactions that populate the most neutron-rich known isotopes, namely those at a lower excitation energy (resulting in fewer neutrons being emitted during de-excitation), or those involving evaporation of charged particles (pxn, evaporating a proton and several neutrons, or αxn, evaporating an alpha particle and several neutrons). This may allow the synthesis of neutron-enriched isotopes of elements 111–117. Although the predicted cross sections are on the order of 1–900 fb, smaller than when only neutrons are evaporated (xn channels), it may still be possible to generate otherwise unreachable isotopes of superheavy elements in these reactions. Some of these heavier isotopes (such as ^{291}Mc, ^{291}Fl, and ^{291}Nh) may also undergo electron capture (converting a proton into a neutron) in addition to alpha decay with relatively long half-lives, decaying to nuclei such as ^{291}Cn that are predicted to lie near the center of the island of stability. However, this remains largely hypothetical as no superheavy nuclei near the beta-stability line have yet been synthesized and predictions of their properties vary considerably across different models. In 2024, a team of researchers at the JINR observed one decay chain of the known isotope ^{289}Mc as a product in the p2n channel of the reaction between ^{242}Pu and ^{50}Ti, an experiment targeting neutron-deficient livermorium isotopes. This was the first successful report of a charged-particle exit channel in a hot fusion reaction between an actinide target and a projectile with Z ≥ 20.

The process of slow neutron capture used to produce nuclides as heavy as ^{257}Fm is blocked by short-lived isotopes of fermium that undergo spontaneous fission (for example, ^{258}Fm has a half-life of 370 μs); this is known as the "fermium gap" and prevents the synthesis of heavier elements in such a reaction. It might be possible to bypass this gap, as well as another predicted region of instability around A = 275 and Z = 104–108, in a series of controlled nuclear explosions with a higher neutron flux (about a thousand times greater than fluxes in existing reactors) that mimics the astrophysical r-process. First proposed in 1972 by Meldner, such a reaction might enable the production of macroscopic quantities of superheavy elements within the island of stability; the role of fission in intermediate superheavy nuclides is highly uncertain, and may strongly influence the yield of such a reaction.

This chart of nuclides used by the Japan Atomic Energy Agency shows known (boxed) and predicted decay modes of nuclei up to Z = 149 and N = 256. Regions of increased stability are visible around the predicted shell closures at N = 184 (^{294}Ds–^{298}Fl) and N = 228 (^{354}126), separated by a gap of short-lived fissioning nuclei (t_{1/2} < 1 ns; not colored in the chart). Elements 113 (nihonium) and 114 (flerovium) had not been assigned names by IUPAC at the time this chart was made.

It may also be possible to generate isotopes in the island of stability such as ^{298}Fl in multi-nucleon transfer reactions in low-energy collisions of actinide nuclei (such as ^{238}U and ^{248}Cm). This inverse quasifission (partial fusion followed by fission, with a shift away from mass equilibrium that results in more asymmetric products) mechanism may provide a path to the island of stability if shell effects around Z = 114 are sufficiently strong, though lighter elements such as nobelium and seaborgium (Z = 102–106) are predicted to have higher yields. Preliminary studies of the ^{238}U + ^{238}U and ^{238}U + ^{248}Cm transfer reactions have failed to produce elements heavier than mendelevium (Z = 101), though the increased yield in the latter reaction suggests that the use of even heavier targets such as ^{254}Es (if available) may enable production of superheavy elements. This result is supported by a later calculation suggesting that the yield of superheavy nuclides (with Z ≤ 109) will likely be higher in transfer reactions using heavier targets. A 2018 study of the ^{238}U + ^{232}Th reaction at the Texas A&M Cyclotron Institute by Sara Wuenschel et al. found several unknown alpha decays that may possibly be attributed to new, neutron-rich isotopes of superheavy elements with 104 < Z < 116, though further research is required to unambiguously determine the atomic number of the products. This result strongly suggests that shell effects have a significant influence on cross sections, and that the island of stability could possibly be reached in future experiments with transfer reactions.

In 2024, Lawrence Berkeley National Laboratory published a reliable way to make element 116, livermorium, using a titanium beam to irradiate a plutonium foil. This method may be useful in producing several more elements beyond Oganesson, element 118.

== Other islands of stability ==
Further shell closures beyond the main island of stability in the vicinity of Z = 112–114 may give rise to additional islands of stability. Although predictions for the location of the next magic numbers vary considerably, two significant islands are thought to exist around heavier doubly magic nuclei; the first near ^{354}126 (with 228 neutrons) and the second near ^{472}164 or ^{482}164 (with 308 or 318 neutrons). Nuclides within these two islands of stability might be especially resistant to spontaneous fission and have alpha decay half-lives measurable in years, thus having comparable stability to elements in the vicinity of flerovium. Other regions of relative stability may also appear with weaker proton shell closures in beta-stable nuclides; such possibilities include regions near ^{342}126 and ^{462}154. Substantially greater electromagnetic repulsion between protons in such heavy nuclei may greatly reduce their stability, and possibly restrict their existence to localized islands in the vicinity of shell effects. This may have the consequence of isolating these islands from the main chart of nuclides, as intermediate nuclides and perhaps elements in a "sea of instability" would rapidly undergo fission and essentially be nonexistent. It is also possible that beyond a region of relative stability around element 126, heavier nuclei would lie beyond a fission threshold given by the liquid drop model and thus undergo fission with very short lifetimes, rendering them essentially nonexistent even in the vicinity of greater magic numbers.

It has also been posited that in the region beyond A > 300, an entire "continent of stability" consisting of a hypothetical phase of stable quark matter, comprising freely flowing up and down quarks rather than quarks bound into protons and neutrons, may exist. Such a form of matter is theorized to be a ground state of baryonic matter with a greater binding energy per baryon than nuclear matter, favoring the decay of nuclear matter beyond this mass threshold into quark matter. If this state of matter exists, it could possibly be synthesized in the same fusion reactions leading to normal superheavy nuclei, and would be stabilized against fission as a consequence of its stronger binding that is enough to overcome Coulomb repulsion.

== See also ==
- Island of inversion
- Table of nuclides
- Facility for Rare Isotope Beams
