= Unbibium =

Unbibium, _{122}Ubb
Theoretical element

Unbibium
- Pronunciation: /ˌuːnbaɪˈbaɪəm/ (OON-by-BY-əm)
- Alternative names: element 122, eka-thorium

Unbibium in the periodic table
Hydrogen																															Helium
Lithium	Beryllium																									Boron	Carbon	Nitrogen	Oxygen	Fluorine	Neon
Sodium	Magnesium																									Aluminium	Silicon	Phosphorus	Sulfur	Chlorine	Argon
Potassium	Calcium															Scandium	Titanium	Vanadium	Chromium	Manganese	Iron	Cobalt	Nickel	Copper	Zinc	Gallium	Germanium	Arsenic	Selenium	Bromine	Krypton
Rubidium	Strontium															Yttrium	Zirconium	Niobium	Molybdenum	Technetium	Ruthenium	Rhodium	Palladium	Silver	Cadmium	Indium	Tin	Antimony	Tellurium	Iodine	Xenon
Caesium	Barium	Lanthanum	Cerium	Praseodymium	Neodymium	Promethium	Samarium	Europium	Gadolinium	Terbium	Dysprosium	Holmium	Erbium	Thulium	Ytterbium	Lutetium	Hafnium	Tantalum	Tungsten	Rhenium	Osmium	Iridium	Platinum	Gold	Mercury (element)	Thallium	Lead	Bismuth	Polonium	Astatine	Radon
Francium	Radium	Actinium	Thorium	Protactinium	Uranium	Neptunium	Plutonium	Americium	Curium	Berkelium	Californium	Einsteinium	Fermium	Mendelevium	Nobelium	Lawrencium	Rutherfordium	Dubnium	Seaborgium	Bohrium	Hassium	Meitnerium	Darmstadtium	Roentgenium	Copernicium	Nihonium	Flerovium	Moscovium	Livermorium	Tennessine	Oganesson
Ununennium	Unbinilium	Unquadtrium	Unquadquadium	Unquadpentium	Unquadhexium	Unquadseptium	Unquadoctium	Unquadennium	Unpentnilium	Unpentunium	Unpentbium	Unpenttrium	Unpentquadium	Unpentpentium	Unpenthexium	Unpentseptium	Unpentoctium	Unpentennium	Unhexnilium	Unhexunium	Unhexbium	Unhextrium	Unhexquadium	Unhexpentium	Unhexhexium	Unhexseptium	Unhexoctium	Unhexennium	Unseptnilium	Unseptunium	Unseptbium
		Unbiunium	Unbibium	Unbitrium	Unbiquadium	Unbipentium	Unbihexium	Unbiseptium	Unbioctium	Unbiennium	Untrinilium	Untriunium	Untribium	Untritrium	Untriquadium	Untripentium	Untrihexium	Untriseptium	Untrioctium	Untriennium	Unquadnilium	Unquadunium	Unquadbium
—
↑
Ubb
↓
—
unbiunium ← unbibium → unbitrium
- Atomic number (Z): 122
- Group: g-block groups (no number)
- Period: period 8 (theoretical, extended table)
- Block: g-block
- Electron configuration: predictions vary, see text

Physical properties
- Phase at STP: unknown

Atomic properties
- Oxidation states: common: (none) (+4)
- Ionization energies: 1st: 545 (predicted) kJ/mol; 2nd: 1090 (predicted) kJ/mol; 3rd: 1848 (predicted) kJ/mol

Other properties
- CAS Number: 54576-73-7

History
- Naming: IUPAC systematic element name

Unbibium, also known as element 122 or eka-thorium, is a hypothetical chemical element; it has placeholder symbol Ubb and atomic number 122. Unbibium and Ubb are the temporary systematic IUPAC name and symbol respectively, which are used until the element is discovered, confirmed, and a permanent name is decided upon. In the periodic table of the elements, it is expected to follow unbiunium as the second element of the superactinides and the fourth element of the 8th period. Similarly to unbiunium, it is expected to fall within the range of the island of stability, potentially conferring additional stability on some isotopes, especially ^{306}Ubb which is expected to have a magic number of neutrons (184).

Despite several attempts, unbibium has not yet been synthesized, nor have any naturally occurring isotopes been found to exist. There are currently no plans to attempt to synthesize unbibium. In 2008, it was claimed to have been discovered in natural thorium samples, but that claim has now been dismissed by recent repetitions of the experiment using more accurate techniques.

Chemically, unbibium is expected to show some resemblance to cerium and thorium. However, relativistic effects may cause some of its properties to differ; for example, it is expected to have a ground state electron configuration of [Og] 7d^{1} 8s^{2} 8p^{1} or [Og] 8s^{2} 8p^{2}, despite its predicted position in the g-block superactinide series.

== Introduction ==
=== Synthesis of superheavy nuclei ===
A graphic depiction of a nuclear fusion reaction. Two nuclei fuse into one, emitting a neutron. Reactions that created new elements to this moment were similar, though varying numbers of neutrons – or alternatively charged particles – may be emitted instead.

A superheavy (Note: In nuclear physics, an element is called heavy if its atomic number is high; lead (element 82) is one example of such a heavy element. The term "superheavy elements" typically refers to elements with atomic number greater than 103 (although there are other definitions, such as atomic number greater than 100 or 112; sometimes, the term is presented an equivalent to the term "transactinide", which puts an upper limit before the beginning of the hypothetical superactinide series). Terms "heavy isotopes" (of a given element) and "heavy nuclei" mean what could be understood in the common language—isotopes of high mass (for the given element) and nuclei of high mass, respectively.) atomic nucleus is created in a nuclear reaction that combines two other nuclei of unequal size (Note: In 2009, a team at the JINR led by Oganessian published results of their attempt to create hassium in a symmetric ^{136}Xe + ^{136}Xe reaction. They failed to observe a single atom in such a reaction, putting the upper limit on the cross section, the measure of probability of a nuclear reaction, as 2.5 pb. In comparison, the reaction that resulted in hassium discovery, ^{208}Pb + ^{58}Fe, had a cross section of ~20 pb (more specifically, 19^{+19}_{-11} pb), as estimated by the discoverers.) into one; roughly, the more unequal the two nuclei in terms of mass, the greater the possibility that the two react. The material made of the heavier nuclei is made into a target, which is then bombarded by the beam of lighter nuclei. Two nuclei can only fuse into one if they are close enough to each other; normally, nuclei (all positively charged) repel each other due to electrostatic repulsion. The strong interaction can overcome this repulsion but only within a very short distance from a nucleus; beam nuclei are thus greatly accelerated in order to make such repulsion insignificant compared to the velocity of the beam nucleus. The energy applied to the beam nuclei to accelerate them can cause them to reach speeds as high as one-tenth of the speed of light. However, if too much energy is applied, the beam nucleus can fall apart.

Coming close enough alone is not enough for two nuclei to fuse: when two nuclei approach each other, they usually remain together for about 10^{−20} seconds and then part ways (not necessarily in the same composition as before the reaction) rather than form a single nucleus. This happens because during the attempted formation of a single nucleus, electrostatic repulsion tears apart the nucleus that is being formed. Each pair of a target and a beam is characterized by its cross section—the probability that fusion will occur if two nuclei approach one another expressed in terms of the transverse area that the incident particle must hit in order for the fusion to occur. (Note: The amount of energy applied to the beam particle to accelerate it can also influence the value of cross section. For example, in the ^{28}_{14}Si + ^{1}_{0}n → ^{28}_{13}Al + ^{1}_{1}p reaction, cross section changes smoothly from 370 mb at 12.3 MeV to 160 mb at 18.3 MeV, with a broad peak at 13.5 MeV with the maximum value of 380 mb.) This fusion may occur as a result of the quantum effect in which nuclei can tunnel through electrostatic repulsion. If the two nuclei can stay close past that phase, multiple nuclear interactions result in redistribution of energy and an energy equilibrium.

External videos
- Visualization of unsuccessful nuclear fusion, based on calculations from the Australian National University

The resulting merger is an excited state—termed a compound nucleus—and thus it is very unstable. To reach a more stable state, the temporary merger may fission without formation of a more stable nucleus. Alternatively, the compound nucleus may eject a few neutrons, which would carry away the excitation energy; if the latter is not sufficient for a neutron expulsion, the merger would produce a gamma ray. This happens in about 10^{−16} seconds after the initial nuclear collision and results in creation of a more stable nucleus. The definition by the IUPAC/IUPAP Joint Working Party (JWP) states that a chemical element can only be recognized as discovered if a nucleus of it has not decayed within 10^{−14} seconds. This value was chosen as an estimate of how long it takes a nucleus to acquire electrons and thus display its chemical properties. (Note: This figure also marks the generally accepted upper limit for lifetime of a compound nucleus.)

=== Decay and detection ===
The beam passes through the target and reaches the next chamber, the separator; if a new nucleus is produced, it is carried with this beam. In the separator, the newly produced nucleus is separated from other nuclides (that of the original beam and any other reaction products) (Note: This separation is based on that the resulting nuclei move past the target more slowly then the unreacted beam nuclei. The separator contains electric and magnetic fields whose effects on a moving particle cancel out for a specific velocity of a particle. Such separation can also be aided by a time-of-flight measurement and a recoil energy measurement; a combination of the two may allow to estimate the mass of a nucleus.) and transferred to a surface-barrier detector, which stops the nucleus. The exact location of the upcoming impact on the detector is marked; also marked are its energy and the time of the arrival. The transfer takes about 10^{−6} seconds; in order to be detected, the nucleus must survive this long. The nucleus is recorded again once its decay is registered, and the location, the energy, and the time of the decay are measured.

Stability of a nucleus is provided by the strong interaction. However, its range is very short; as nuclei become larger, its influence on the outermost nucleons (protons and neutrons) weakens. At the same time, the nucleus is torn apart by electrostatic repulsion between protons, and its range is not limited. Total binding energy provided by the strong interaction increases linearly with the number of nucleons, whereas electrostatic repulsion increases with the square of the atomic number, i.e. the latter grows faster and becomes increasingly important for heavy and superheavy nuclei. Superheavy nuclei are thus theoretically predicted and have so far been observed to predominantly decay via decay modes that are caused by such repulsion: alpha decay and spontaneous fission. (Note: Not all decay modes are caused by electrostatic repulsion. For example, beta decay is caused by the weak interaction.) Almost all alpha emitters have over 210 nucleons, and the lightest nuclide primarily undergoing spontaneous fission has 238. In both decay modes, nuclei are inhibited from decaying by corresponding energy barriers for each mode, but they can be tunneled through.

Scheme of an apparatus for creation of superheavy elements, based on the Dubna Gas-Filled Recoil Separator set up in the Flerov Laboratory of Nuclear Reactions in JINR. The trajectory within the detector and the beam focusing apparatus changes because of a dipole magnet in the former and quadrupole magnets in the latter.

Alpha particles are commonly produced in radioactive decays because the mass of an alpha particle per nucleon is small enough to leave some energy for the alpha particle to be used as kinetic energy to leave the nucleus. Spontaneous fission is caused by electrostatic repulsion tearing the nucleus apart and produces various nuclei in different instances of identical nuclei fissioning. As the atomic number increases, spontaneous fission rapidly becomes more important: spontaneous fission partial half-lives decrease by 23 orders of magnitude from uranium (element 92) to nobelium (element 102), and by 30 orders of magnitude from thorium (element 90) to fermium (element 100). The earlier liquid drop model thus suggested that spontaneous fission would occur nearly instantly due to disappearance of the fission barrier for nuclei with about 280 nucleons. The later nuclear shell model suggested that nuclei with about 300 nucleons would form an island of stability in which nuclei will be more resistant to spontaneous fission and will primarily undergo alpha decay with longer half-lives. Subsequent discoveries suggested that the predicted island might be further than originally anticipated; they also showed that nuclei intermediate between the long-lived actinides and the predicted island are deformed, and gain additional stability from shell effects. Experiments on lighter superheavy nuclei, as well as those closer to the expected island, have shown greater than previously anticipated stability against spontaneous fission, showing the importance of shell effects on nuclei. (Note: It was already known by the 1960s that ground states of nuclei differed in energy and shape as well as that certain magic numbers of nucleons corresponded to greater stability of a nucleus. However, it was assumed that there was no nuclear structure in superheavy nuclei as they were too deformed to form one.)

Alpha decays are registered by the emitted alpha particles, and the decay products are easy to determine before the actual decay; if such a decay or a series of consecutive decays produces a known nucleus, the original product of a reaction can be easily determined. (Note: Since mass of a nucleus is not measured directly but is rather calculated from that of another nucleus, such measurement is called indirect. Direct measurements are also possible, but for the most part they have remained unavailable for superheavy nuclei. The first direct measurement of mass of a superheavy nucleus was reported in 2018 at LBNL. Mass was determined from the location of a nucleus after the transfer (the location helps determine its trajectory, which is linked to the mass-to-charge ratio of the nucleus, since the transfer was done in presence of a magnet).) (That all decays within a decay chain were indeed related to each other is established by the location of these decays, which must be in the same place.) The known nucleus can be recognized by the specific characteristics of decay it undergoes such as decay energy (or more specifically, the kinetic energy of the emitted particle). (Note: If the decay occurred in a vacuum, then since total momentum of an isolated system before and after the decay must be preserved, the daughter nucleus would also receive a small velocity. The ratio of the two velocities, and accordingly the ratio of the kinetic energies, would thus be inverse to the ratio of the two masses. The decay energy equals the sum of the known kinetic energy of the alpha particle and that of the daughter nucleus (an exact fraction of the former). The calculations hold for an experiment as well, but the difference is that the nucleus does not move after the decay because it is tied to the detector.) Spontaneous fission, however, produces various nuclei as products, so the original nuclide cannot be determined from its daughters. (Note: Spontaneous fission was discovered by Soviet physicist Georgy Flerov, a leading scientist at JINR, and thus it was a "hobbyhorse" for the facility. In contrast, the LBL scientists believed fission information was not sufficient for a claim of synthesis of an element. They believed spontaneous fission had not been studied enough to use it for identification of a new element, since there was a difficulty of establishing that a compound nucleus had only ejected neutrons and not charged particles like protons or alpha particles. They thus preferred to link new isotopes to the already known ones by successive alpha decays.)

The information available to physicists aiming to synthesize a superheavy element is thus the information collected at the detectors: location, energy, and time of arrival of a particle to the detector, and those of its decay. The physicists analyze this data and seek to conclude that it was indeed caused by a new element and could not have been caused by a different nuclide than the one claimed. Often, provided data is insufficient for a conclusion that a new element was definitely created and there is no other explanation for the observed effects; errors in interpreting data have been made. (Note: For instance, element 102 was mistakenly identified in 1957 at the Nobel Institute of Physics in Stockholm, Stockholm County, Sweden. There were no earlier definitive claims of creation of this element, and the element was assigned a name by its Swedish, American, and British discoverers, nobelium. It was later shown that the identification was incorrect. The following year, RL was unable to reproduce the Swedish results and announced instead their synthesis of the element; that claim was also disproved later. JINR insisted that they were the first to create the element and suggested a name of their own for the new element, joliotium; the Soviet name was also not accepted (JINR later referred to the naming of the element 102 as "hasty"). This name was proposed to IUPAC in a written response to their ruling on priority of discovery claims of elements, signed 29 September 1992. The name "nobelium" remained unchanged on account of its widespread usage.)

== History ==
=== Synthesis attempts ===
==== Fusion-evaporation ====
Two attempts were made to synthesize unbibium in the 1970s, both propelled by early predictions on the island of stability at N = 184 and Z > 120, and in particular whether superheavy elements could potentially be naturally occurring. The first attempts to synthesize unbibium were performed in 1972 by Flerov et al. at the Joint Institute for Nuclear Research (JINR), using the heavy-ion induced hot fusion reactions:

^{238}_{92}U + ^{66,68}_{30}Zn → ^{304,306}_{122}Ubb* → no atoms

Another unsuccessful attempt to synthesize unbibium was carried out in 1978 at the GSI Helmholtz Center, where a natural erbium target was bombarded with xenon-136 ions:

^{nat}_{68}Er + ^{136}_{54}Xe → ^{298,300,302,303,304,306}Ubb* → no atoms

No atoms were detected and a yield limit of 5 nb (5,000 pb) was measured. Current results (see flerovium) have shown that the sensitivity of these experiments were too low by at least 3 orders of magnitude. In particular, the reaction between ^{170}Er and ^{136}Xe was expected to yield alpha emitters with half-lives of microseconds that would decay down to isotopes of flerovium with half-lives perhaps increasing up to several hours, as flerovium is predicted to lie near the center of the island of stability. After twelve hours of irradiation, nothing was found in this reaction. Following a similar unsuccessful attempt to synthesize unbiunium from ^{238}U and ^{65}Cu, it was concluded that half-lives of superheavy nuclei must be less than one microsecond or the cross sections are very small. More recent research into synthesis of superheavy elements suggests that both conclusions are true.

In 2000, the Gesellschaft für Schwerionenforschung (GSI) Helmholtz Center for Heavy Ion Research performed a very similar experiment with much higher sensitivity:

^{238}_{92}U + ^{70}_{30}Zn → ^{308}_{122}Ubb* → no atoms

These results indicate that the synthesis of such heavier elements remains a significant challenge and further improvements of beam intensity and experimental efficiency is required. The sensitivity should be increased to 1 fb in the future for more quality results.

==== Compound nucleus fission ====
Several experiments studying the fission characteristics of various superheavy compound nuclei such as ^{306}Ubb were performed between 2000 and 2004 at the Flerov Laboratory of Nuclear Reactions. Two nuclear reactions were used, namely ^{248}Cm + ^{58}Fe and ^{242}Pu + ^{64}Ni. The results reveal how superheavy nuclei fission predominantly by expelling closed shell nuclei such as ^{132}Sn (Z = 50, N = 82). It was also found that the yield for the fusion-fission pathway was similar between ^{48}Ca and ^{58}Fe projectiles, suggesting a possible future use of ^{58}Fe projectiles in superheavy element formation.

=== Claimed discovery as a naturally occurring element ===
In 2008, a group led by Israeli physicist Amnon Marinov at the Hebrew University of Jerusalem claimed to have found single atoms of unbibium-292 in naturally occurring thorium deposits at an abundance of between 10^{−11} and 10^{−12} relative to thorium. This was the first time in 69 years that a new element had been claimed to be discovered in nature, after Marguerite Perey's 1939 discovery of francium. (Note: Four more elements were discovered after 1939 through synthesis, but were later found to also occur naturally: these were promethium, astatine, neptunium, and plutonium. All of them had been synthesized by 1945, and discovered in nature by 1965.) The claim of Marinov et al. was criticized by the scientific community, and Marinov said that he submitted the article to the journals Nature and Nature Physics but both turned it down without sending it for peer review. The unbibium-292 atoms were claimed to be superdeformed or hyperdeformed isomers, with a half-life of at least 100 million years.

A criticism of the technique, previously used in purportedly identifying lighter thorium isotopes by mass spectrometry, was published in Physical Review C in 2008. A rebuttal by the Marinov group was published in Physical Review C after the published comment.

A repeat of the thorium experiment using the superior method of accelerator mass spectrometry (AMS) failed to confirm the results, despite a 100-fold better sensitivity. This result throws considerable doubt on the results of the Marinov collaboration with regards to their claims of long-lived isotopes of thorium, roentgenium, and unbibium. Current understanding of superheavy elements indicates that it is very unlikely for any traces of unbibium to persist in natural thorium samples.

=== Naming ===
Using Mendeleev's nomenclature for unnamed and undiscovered elements, unbibium should instead be known as eka-thorium. After the recommendations of the IUPAC in 1979, the element has since been largely referred to as unbibium with the atomic symbol of (Ubb), as its temporary name until the element is officially discovered and synthesized, and a permanent name is decided on. Scientists largely ignore this naming convention, and instead simply refer to unbibium as "element 122" with the symbol of (122), or sometimes even E122 or 122.

== Prospects for future synthesis ==
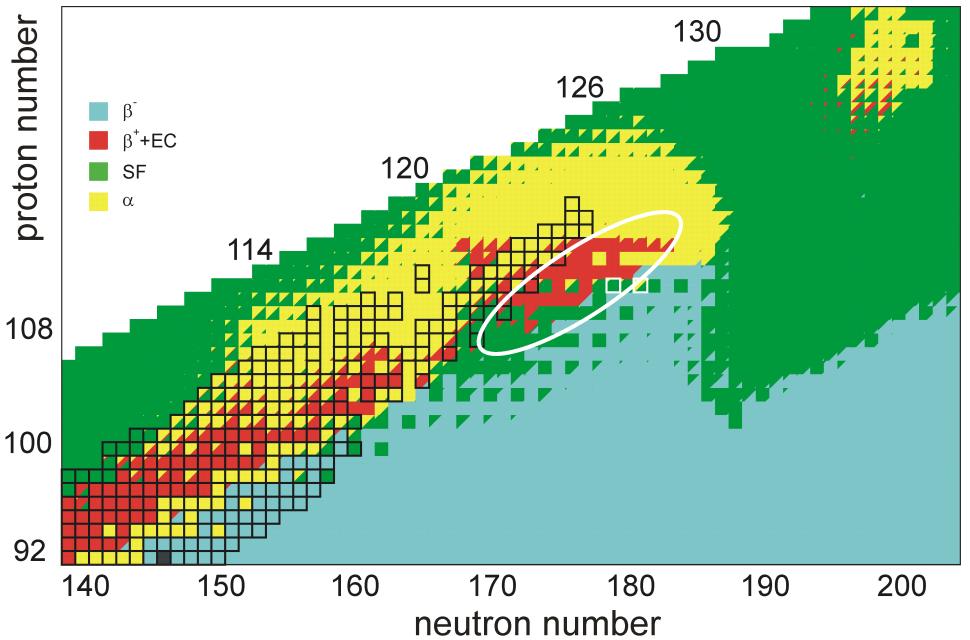
Predicted decay modes of superheavy nuclei. The line of synthesized proton-rich nuclei is expected to be broken soon after Z = 120, because of the shortening half-lives until around Z = 124, the increasing contribution of spontaneous fission instead of alpha decay from Z = 122 onward until it dominates from Z = 125, and the proton drip line around Z = 130. The white ring denotes the expected location of the island of stability; the two squares outlined in white denote ^{291}Cn and ^{293}Cn, predicted to be the longest-lived nuclides on the island with half-lives of centuries or millennia.

Every element from mendelevium onward was produced in fusion-evaporation reactions, culminating in the discovery of the heaviest known element oganesson in 2002 and most recently tennessine in 2010. These reactions approached the limit of current technology; for example, the synthesis of tennessine required 22 milligrams of ^{249}Bk and an intense ^{48}Ca beam for six months. The intensity of beams in superheavy element research cannot exceed 10^{12} projectiles per second without damaging the target and detector, and producing larger quantities of increasingly rare and unstable actinide targets is impractical. Consequently, future experiments must be done at facilities such as the superheavy element factory (SHE-factory) at the Joint Institute for Nuclear Research (JINR) or RIKEN, which will allow experiments to run for longer stretches of time with increased detection capabilities and enable otherwise inaccessible reactions.

It is possible that fusion-evaporation reactions will not be suitable for the discovery of unbibium or heavier elements. Various models predict increasingly short alpha and spontaneous fission half-lives for isotopes with Z = 122 and N ~ 180 on the order of microseconds or less, rendering detection nearly impossible with current equipment. The increasing dominance of spontaneous fission also may sever possible ties to known nuclei of livermorium or oganesson and make identification and confirmation more difficult; a similar problem occurred in the road to confirmation of the decay chain of ^{294}Og which has no anchor to known nuclei. For these reasons, other methods of production may need to be researched such as multi-nucleon transfer reactions capable of populating longer-lived nuclei. A similar switch in experimental technique occurred when hot fusion using ^{48}Ca projectiles was used instead of cold fusion (in which cross sections decrease rapidly with increasing atomic number) to populate elements with Z > 113.

Nevertheless, several fusion-evaporation reactions leading to unbibium have been proposed in addition to those already tried unsuccessfully, though no institution has immediate plans to make synthesis attempts, instead focusing first on elements 119, 120, and possibly 121. Because cross sections increase with asymmetry of the reaction, a chromium beam would be most favorable in combination with a californium target, especially if the predicted closed neutron shell at N = 184 could be reached in more neutron-rich products and confer additional stability. In particular, the reaction between ^{54}_{24}Cr and ^{252}_{98}Cf would generate the compound nucleus ^{306}_{122}Ubb and reach the shell at N = 184, though the analogous reaction with a ^{249}_{98}Cf target is believed to be more feasible because of the presence of unwanted fission products from ^{252}_{98}Cf and difficulty in accumulating the required amount of target material. One possible synthesis of unbibium could occur as follows:

^{249}_{98}Cf + ^{54}_{24}Cr → ^{300}_{122}Ubb + 3 ^{1}_{0}n

Should this reaction be successful and alpha decay remain dominant over spontaneous fission, the resultant ^{300}Ubb would decay through ^{296}Ubn which may be populated in cross-bombardment between ^{249}Cf and ^{50}Ti. Although this reaction is one of the most promising options for the synthesis of unbibium in the near future, the maximum cross section is predicted to be 3 fb, one order of magnitude lower than the lowest measured cross section in a successful reaction. The more symmetrical reactions ^{244}Pu + ^{64}Ni and ^{248}Cm + ^{58}Fe have also been proposed and may produce more neutron-rich isotopes. With increasing atomic number, one must also be aware of decreasing fission barrier heights, resulting in lower survival probability of compound nuclei, especially above the predicted magic numbers at Z = 126 and N = 184.

== Predicted properties ==
=== Nuclear stability and isotopes ===
A chart of nuclide stability as used by the Dubna team in 2010. Characterized isotopes are shown with borders. Beyond element 118 (oganesson, the last known element), the line of known nuclides is expected to rapidly enter a region of instability, with no half-lives over one microsecond after element 121; this poses difficulties in identifying heavier elements such as unbibium. The elliptical region encloses the predicted location of the island of stability.

The stability of nuclei decreases greatly with the increase in atomic number after plutonium, the heaviest primordial element, so that all isotopes with an atomic number above 101 decay radioactively with a half-life under a day. No elements with atomic numbers above 82 (after lead) have stable isotopes. Nevertheless, because of reasons not very well understood yet, there is a slight increased nuclear stability around atomic numbers 110–114, which leads to the appearance of what is known in nuclear physics as the "island of stability". This concept, proposed by University of California professor Glenn Seaborg, explains why superheavy elements last longer than predicted.

In this region of the periodic table, N = 184 has been suggested as a closed neutron shell, and various atomic numbers have been proposed as closed proton shells, such as Z = 114, 120, 122, 124, and 126. The island of stability would be characterized by longer half-lives of nuclei located near these magic numbers, though the extent of stabilizing effects is uncertain due to predictions of weakening of the proton shell closures and possible loss of double magicity. More recent research predicts the island of stability to instead be centered at beta-stable copernicium isotopes ^{291}Cn and ^{293}Cn, which would place unbibium well above the island and result in short half-lives regardless of shell effects. The increased stability of elements 112–118 has also been attributed to the oblate shape of such nuclei and resistance to spontaneous fission. The same model also proposes ^{306}Ubb as the next spherical doubly magic nucleus, thus defining the true island of stability for spherical nuclei.

Regions of differently shaped nuclei, as predicted by the Interacting Boson Approximation

A quantum tunneling model predicts the alpha-decay half-lives of unbibium isotopes ^{284–322}Ubb to be on the order of microseconds or less for all isotopes lighter than ^{315}Ubb, highlighting a significant challenge in experimental observation of this element. This is consistent with many predictions, though the exact location of the 1 microsecond border varies by model. Additionally, spontaneous fission is expected to become a major decay mode in this region, with half-lives on the order of femtoseconds predicted for some even–even isotopes due to minimal hindrance resulting from nucleon pairing and loss of stabilizing effects farther away from magic numbers. A 2016 calculation on the half-lives and probable decay chains of isotopes ^{280–339}Ubb yields corroborating results: ^{280–297}Ubb will be proton unbound and possibly decay by proton emission, ^{298–314}Ubb will have alpha half-lives on the order of microseconds, and those heavier than ^{314}Ubb will predominantly decay by spontaneous fission with short half-lives. For the lighter alpha emitters that may be populated in fusion-evaporation reactions, some long decay chains leading down to known or reachable isotopes of lighter elements are predicted. Additionally, the isotopes ^{308–310}Ubb are predicted to have half-lives under 1 microsecond, too short for detection as a result of significantly lower binding energy for neutron numbers immediately above the N = 184 shell closure. Alternatively, a second island of stability with total half-lives of approximately 1 second may exist around Z ~ 124 and N ~ 198, though these nuclei will be difficult or impossible to reach using current experimental techniques. However, these predictions are strongly dependent on the chosen nuclear mass models, and it is unknown which isotopes of unbibium will be most stable. Regardless, these nuclei will be hard to synthesize as no combination of obtainable target and projectile can provide enough neutrons in the compound nucleus. Even for nuclei reachable in fusion reactions, spontaneous fission and possibly also cluster decay might have significant branches, posing another hurdle to identification of superheavy elements as they are normally identified by their successive alpha decays.

=== Chemical ===
Unbibium is predicted to be similar in chemistry to cerium and thorium, which likewise have four valence electrons above a noble gas core, although it may be more reactive. Additionally, unbibium is predicted to belong to a new block of valence g-electron atoms, although the 5g orbital is not expected to start filling until about element 125. The predicted ground-state electron configuration of unbibium is either [Og] 7d^{1} 8s^{2} 8p^{1} or 8s^{2} 8p^{2}, in contrast to the expected [Og] 5g^{2} 8s^{2} in which the 5g orbital starts filling at element 121. (The ds^{2}p and s^{2}p^{2} configurations are expected to be only separated by about 0.02 eV.) In the superactinides, relativistic effects might cause a breakdown of the Aufbau principle and create overlapping of the 5g, 6f, 7d and 8p orbitals; experiments on the chemistry of copernicium and flerovium provide strong indications of the increasing role of relativistic effects. As such, the chemistry of elements following unbibium becomes more difficult to predict.

Unbibium would most likely form a dioxide, UbbO_{2}, and tetrahalides, such as UbbF_{4} and UbbCl_{4}. The main oxidation state is predicted to be +4, similar to cerium and thorium. A first ionization energy of 5.651 eV and second ionization energy of 11.332 eV are predicted for unbibium; this and other calculated ionization energies are lower than the analogous values for thorium, suggesting that unbibium will be more reactive than thorium.

== Bibliography ==
- Audi, G.; Kondev, F. G.; Wang, M.; et al. (2017). "The NUBASE2016 evaluation of nuclear properties" (PDF). Chinese Physics C. 41 (3) 030001. Bibcode:2017ChPhC..41c0001A. doi:10.1088/1674-1137/41/3/030001.
- Beiser, A. (2003). Concepts of modern physics (6th ed.). McGraw-Hill. ISBN 978-0-07-244848-1. OCLC 48965418.
- Hoffman, D. C.; Ghiorso, A.; Seaborg, G. T. (2000). The Transuranium People: The Inside Story. World Scientific. ISBN 978-1-78-326244-1.
- Hoffman, D. C.; Lee, D. M.; Pershina, V. (2006). "Transactinides and the future elements". In Morss, L. R.; Edelstein, N. M.; Fuger, J. (eds.). The Chemistry of the Actinide and Transactinide Elements. Vol. 3 (3rd ed.). Dordrecht, The Netherlands: Springer. pp. 1652–1752. ISBN 1-4020-3555-1.
- Kragh, H. (2018). From Transuranic to Superheavy Elements: A Story of Dispute and Creation. Springer. ISBN 978-3-319-75813-8.
- Zagrebaev, V.; Karpov, A.; Greiner, W. (2013). "Future of superheavy element research: Which nuclei could be synthesized within the next few years?". Journal of Physics: Conference Series. 420 (1). 012001. arXiv:1207.5700. Bibcode:2013JPhCS.420a2001Z. doi:10.1088/1742-6596/420/1/012001. ISSN 1742-6588. S2CID 55434734.
