= Jolie Cizewski =

American nuclear physicist

Jolie Antonia Cizewski (born 1951) is an American nuclear physicist known for her work on high-mass nuclei, including their symmetries, superdeformation, magic numbers, and the r-process. She is a distinguished professor of physics at Rutgers University.

== Early life and education ==
Cizewski grew up in Maryland. Her father was a soldier and postal worker, and her mother was a refugee from post-World-War-II Czechoslovakia; neither completed a high school diploma. She was inspired to go into physics and astronomy as a young girl by the Sputnik program and books about space travel. After being excluded from her elementary school science club for being a girl, she was allowed to join in the sixth grade, and by high school was participating in computer and mathematics summer programs at the University of Pennsylvania, where she did her undergraduate studies. After switching between mathematics, physics, and astronomy, and working summers in the nuclear physics laboratory of H. Terry Fortune at the university, she graduated in 1973 with a degree in physics.

She became a graduate student in physics at Stony Brook University, where she completed her doctorate in 1978. Her dissertation, The level structure of ^{196}Pt and the interacting boson approximation, was supervised by Linwood L. Lee. Others of her mentors in physics included Richard Casten, then at the Brookhaven National Laboratory where she did summer research as a graduate student, and Fay Ajzenberg-Selove, who recommended her to the Pennsylvania nuclear physics laboratory.

== Career ==
After postdoctoral research at the Los Alamos National Laboratory, Cizewski became an assistant professor at Yale University in 1980. She writes that, at that time, the typical career track for junior faculty at Yale was to stay for ten years, not be offered tenure, and find a position at a different university; however, she only intended to stay for five years, and then move to a research laboratory. Instead, discovering that she liked professorial work, she stayed for six years before moving to Rutgers as a tenured associate professor in 1986. She was named distinguished professor at Rutgers in 2002. There, she has served as associate chair, graduate program director, vice dean of the graduate school, and acting dean of the graduate school, and maintains laboratory facilities at the Oak Ridge National Laboratory.

== Recognition ==
In 1990 Cizewski was named a Fellow of the American Physical Society (APS), after a nomination from the APS Division of Nuclear Physics, "for her contributions to the understanding of symmetries in nuclear structure and, in particular, to the experimental verifications of the predictions of the interacting-boson model". She is also a Fellow of the American Association for the Advancement of Science.

Rutgers University gave Cizewski their Daniel Gorenstein Memorial Award in 2016, in recognition of both her scholarly work and service to the university. In 2020 she won the APS Division of Nuclear Physics Mentoring Award "for her exceptional commitment to undergraduate and graduate education which has had an enormous and continued impact on the lives of first-generation college students, women in physics, graduate students and early career scientists".
