= Amnon Marinov =

Israeli nuclear physicist (1930–2011)

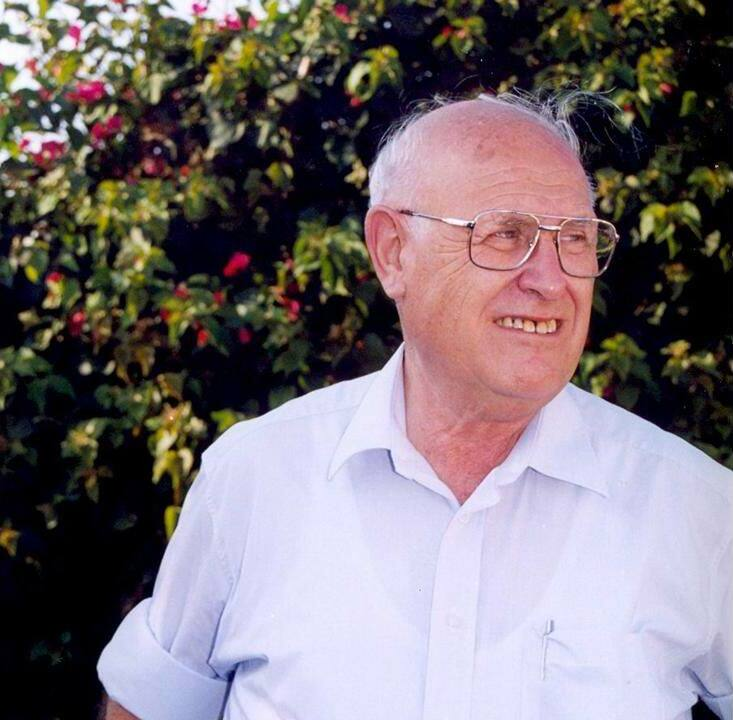
Amnon Marinov

Amnon Marinov (Hebrew: אמנון מרינוב; 1930 – 2011) was an Israeli physicist. He undertook research into nuclear structures, nuclear reactions, superheavy elements and long-lived nuclear isomers.

== Claimed discovery of unbibium ==
On April 24, 2008, a group led by Marinov at Hebrew University of Jerusalem claimed to have found single atoms of unbibium-292 in natural thorium deposits at an abundance of 10^{−11} to 10^{−12} relative to thorium. This was the first time in sixty-nine years that a new element had been claimed to be discovered in nature, after Marguerite Perey's 1939 discovery of francium. (Note: Four more elements were discovered after 1939 through synthesis, but were later found to also occur naturally: these were promethium, astatine, neptunium, and plutonium, all of which had been found by 1945.) The claim of Marinov et al. was criticized by a part of the scientific community, and Marinov said he submitted the article to the journals Nature and Nature Physics but both turned it down without sending it for peer review. The unbibium-292 atoms were claimed to be superdeformed or hyperdeformed nuclear isomers, with a half-life of at least 10^{8} years.

A criticism of the technique, previously used in purportedly identifying lighter thorium isotopes by mass spectrometry, was published in Physical Review C in 2008. A rebuttal by the Marinov group was published in Physical Review C after the published comment.

A repeat of the thorium experiment using the superior method of accelerator mass spectrometry (AMS) failed to confirm the results, despite a 100-fold better sensitivity. This result throws considerable doubt on the results of the Marinov collaboration with regards to their claims of long-lived isotopes of thorium, roentgenium and unbibium. It is still possible that traces of unbibium might exist in some thorium samples, though given current understanding of superheavy elements, this is very unlikely.

== Family ==
Amnon Marinov lived in Jerusalem, Israel with his wife Rachel; they have four children and six grandchildren. His father, Haim Marinov (1904–2001), was the deputy mayor of Jerusalem from 1964 until 1973. His father-in-law, Ya'akov Maimon (1902–1977), was the inventor of Hebrew stenography and received the Israel Prize in 1976 for his lifelong voluntary work teaching Hebrew to new immigrants all over the country. Amnon Marinov died on December 7, 2011.
