= Flerovium =

Flerovium, _{114}Fl
Flerovium
- Pronunciation: /fləˈroʊviəm/ (flə-ROH-vee-əm); /flɛˈroʊviəm/ (fleh-ROH-vee-əm)
- Mass number: [289] (unconfirmed: 290)

Flerovium in the periodic table
Hydrogen																															Helium
Lithium	Beryllium																									Boron	Carbon	Nitrogen	Oxygen	Fluorine	Neon
Sodium	Magnesium																									Aluminium	Silicon	Phosphorus	Sulfur	Chlorine	Argon
Potassium	Calcium															Scandium	Titanium	Vanadium	Chromium	Manganese	Iron	Cobalt	Nickel	Copper	Zinc	Gallium	Germanium	Arsenic	Selenium	Bromine	Krypton
Rubidium	Strontium															Yttrium	Zirconium	Niobium	Molybdenum	Technetium	Ruthenium	Rhodium	Palladium	Silver	Cadmium	Indium	Tin	Antimony	Tellurium	Iodine	Xenon
Caesium	Barium	Lanthanum	Cerium	Praseodymium	Neodymium	Promethium	Samarium	Europium	Gadolinium	Terbium	Dysprosium	Holmium	Erbium	Thulium	Ytterbium	Lutetium	Hafnium	Tantalum	Tungsten	Rhenium	Osmium	Iridium	Platinum	Gold	Mercury (element)	Thallium	Lead	Bismuth	Polonium	Astatine	Radon
Francium	Radium	Actinium	Thorium	Protactinium	Uranium	Neptunium	Plutonium	Americium	Curium	Berkelium	Californium	Einsteinium	Fermium	Mendelevium	Nobelium	Lawrencium	Rutherfordium	Dubnium	Seaborgium	Bohrium	Hassium	Meitnerium	Darmstadtium	Roentgenium	Copernicium	Nihonium	Flerovium	Moscovium	Livermorium	Tennessine	Oganesson
Pb
↑
Fl
↓
—
nihonium ← flerovium → moscovium
- Atomic number (Z): 114
- Group: group 14 (carbon group)
- Period: period 7
- Block: p-block
- Electron configuration: [Rn] 5f^{14} 6d^{10} 7s^{2} 7p^{2} (predicted)
- Electrons per shell: 2, 8, 18, 32, 32, 18, 4 (predicted)

Physical properties
- Phase at STP: liquid (predicted)
- Melting point: 284 ± 50 K (11 ± 50 °C, 52 ± 90 °F) (predicted)
- Density (near r.t.): 11.4 ± 0.3 g/cm^{3} (predicted)
- Heat of vaporization: 38 kJ/mol (predicted)

Atomic properties
- Oxidation states: common: (none)
- Ionization energies: 1st: 832.2 kJ/mol (predicted); 2nd: 1600 kJ/mol (predicted); 3rd: 3370 kJ/mol (predicted); (more)
- Atomic radius: empirical: 180 pm (predicted)
- Covalent radius: 171–177 pm (extrapolated)

Other properties
- Natural occurrence: synthetic
- CAS Number: 54085-16-4

History
- Naming: after the Flerov Laboratory of Nuclear Reactions of the Joint Institute for Nuclear Research (itself named after Georgy Flyorov)
- Discovery: Joint Institute for Nuclear Research (JINR) and Lawrence Livermore National Laboratory (LLNL) (1999)

Isotopes of flerovium
Main isotopes			Decay	
Isotope	abundance	half-life (t_{1/2})	mode	product
^{284}Fl	synth	2.5 ms	SF	–
^{284}Fl	synth	2.5 ms	α	^{280}Cn
^{285}Fl	synth	100 ms	α	^{281}Cn
^{286}Fl	synth	105 ms	α55%	^{282}Cn
^{286}Fl	synth	105 ms	SF45%	–
^{287}Fl	synth	360 ms	α	^{283}Cn
^{287}Fl	synth	360 ms	ε?	^{287}Nh
^{288}Fl	synth	653 ms	α	^{284}Cn
^{289}Fl	synth	1.9 s	α	^{285}Cn
^{290}Fl	synth	19 s?	EC	^{290}Nh
^{290}Fl	synth	19 s?	α	^{286}Cn

Flerovium is a synthetic chemical element; it has symbol Fl and atomic number 114. It is an extremely radioactive, superheavy element, named after the Flerov Laboratory of Nuclear Reactions of the Joint Institute for Nuclear Research in Dubna, Russia, where the element was discovered in 1999. The lab's name, in turn, honours Russian physicist Georgy Flyorov (Флёров in Cyrillic, hence the transliteration of "yo" to "ë"). IUPAC adopted the name on 30 May 2012. The name and symbol had previously been proposed for element 102 (nobelium) but were not accepted by IUPAC at that time.

It is a transactinide in the p-block of the periodic table. It is in period 7 and is the heaviest known member of the carbon group. Initial chemical studies in 2007–2008 indicated that flerovium was unexpectedly volatile for a group 14 element. More recent results show that flerovium's reaction with gold is similar to that of copernicium, showing it is very volatile and may even be gaseous at standard temperature and pressure. Nonetheless, it also seems to show some metallic properties, consistent with it being the heavier homologue of lead.

Very little is known about flerovium, as it can only be produced one atom at a time, either through direct synthesis or through radioactive decay of even heavier elements, and all known isotopes are short-lived. Six isotopes of flerovium are known, ranging in mass number between 284 and 289; the most stable of these, ^{289}Fl, has a half-life of ~2.1 seconds, but the unconfirmed ^{290}Fl may have a longer half-life of 19 seconds, which would be one of the longest half-lives of any nuclide in these farthest reaches of the periodic table. Flerovium is predicted to be near the centre of the theorized island of stability, and it is expected that heavier flerovium isotopes, especially the possibly magic ^{298}Fl, may have even longer half-lives.

== Introduction ==
=== Synthesis of superheavy nuclei ===
A graphic depiction of a nuclear fusion reaction. Two nuclei fuse into one, emitting a neutron. Reactions that created new elements to this moment were similar, though varying numbers of neutrons – or alternatively charged particles – may be emitted instead.

A superheavy (Note: In nuclear physics, an element is called heavy if its atomic number is high; lead (element 82) is one example of such a heavy element. The term "superheavy elements" typically refers to elements with atomic number greater than 103 (although there are other definitions, such as atomic number greater than 100 or 112; sometimes, the term is presented an equivalent to the term "transactinide", which puts an upper limit before the beginning of the hypothetical superactinide series). Terms "heavy isotopes" (of a given element) and "heavy nuclei" mean what could be understood in the common language—isotopes of high mass (for the given element) and nuclei of high mass, respectively.) atomic nucleus is created in a nuclear reaction that combines two other nuclei of unequal size (Note: In 2009, a team at the JINR led by Oganessian published results of their attempt to create hassium in a symmetric ^{136}Xe + ^{136}Xe reaction. They failed to observe a single atom in such a reaction, putting the upper limit on the cross section, the measure of probability of a nuclear reaction, as 2.5 pb. In comparison, the reaction that resulted in hassium discovery, ^{208}Pb + ^{58}Fe, had a cross section of ~20 pb (more specifically, 19^{+19}_{-11} pb), as estimated by the discoverers.) into one; roughly, the more unequal the two nuclei in terms of mass, the greater the possibility that the two react. The material made of the heavier nuclei is made into a target, which is then bombarded by the beam of lighter nuclei. Two nuclei can only fuse into one if they are close enough to each other; normally, nuclei (all positively charged) repel each other due to electrostatic repulsion. The strong interaction can overcome this repulsion but only within a very short distance from a nucleus; beam nuclei are thus greatly accelerated in order to make such repulsion insignificant compared to the velocity of the beam nucleus. The energy applied to the beam nuclei to accelerate them can cause them to reach speeds as high as one-tenth of the speed of light. However, if too much energy is applied, the beam nucleus can fall apart.

Coming close enough alone is not enough for two nuclei to fuse: when two nuclei approach each other, they usually remain together for about 10^{−20} seconds and then part ways (not necessarily in the same composition as before the reaction) rather than form a single nucleus. This happens because during the attempted formation of a single nucleus, electrostatic repulsion tears apart the nucleus that is being formed. Each pair of a target and a beam is characterized by its cross section—the probability that fusion will occur if two nuclei approach one another expressed in terms of the transverse area that the incident particle must hit in order for the fusion to occur. (Note: The amount of energy applied to the beam particle to accelerate it can also influence the value of cross section. For example, in the ^{28}_{14}Si + ^{1}_{0}n → ^{28}_{13}Al + ^{1}_{1}p reaction, cross section changes smoothly from 370 mb at 12.3 MeV to 160 mb at 18.3 MeV, with a broad peak at 13.5 MeV with the maximum value of 380 mb.) This fusion may occur as a result of the quantum effect in which nuclei can tunnel through electrostatic repulsion. If the two nuclei can stay close past that phase, multiple nuclear interactions result in redistribution of energy and an energy equilibrium.

External videos
- Visualization of unsuccessful nuclear fusion, based on calculations from the Australian National University

The resulting merger is an excited state—termed a compound nucleus—and thus it is very unstable. To reach a more stable state, the temporary merger may fission without formation of a more stable nucleus. Alternatively, the compound nucleus may eject a few neutrons, which would carry away the excitation energy; if the latter is not sufficient for a neutron expulsion, the merger would produce a gamma ray. This happens in about 10^{−16} seconds after the initial nuclear collision and results in creation of a more stable nucleus. The definition by the IUPAC/IUPAP Joint Working Party (JWP) states that a chemical element can only be recognized as discovered if a nucleus of it exists for at least 10^{−14} seconds. This value was chosen as an estimate of how long it takes a nucleus to acquire electrons and thus display its chemical properties. (Note: This figure also marks the generally accepted upper limit for lifetime of a compound nucleus.)

=== Decay and detection ===
The beam passes through the target and reaches the next chamber, the separator; if a new nucleus is produced, it is carried with this beam. In the separator, the newly produced nucleus is separated from other nuclides (that of the original beam and any other reaction products) (Note: This separation is based on that the resulting nuclei move past the target more slowly then the unreacted beam nuclei. The separator contains electric and magnetic fields whose effects on a moving particle cancel out for a specific velocity of a particle. Such separation can also be aided by a time-of-flight measurement and a recoil energy measurement; a combination of the two may allow to estimate the mass of a nucleus.) and transferred to a surface-barrier detector, which stops the nucleus. The exact location of the upcoming impact on the detector is marked; also marked are its energy and the time of the arrival. The transfer takes about 10^{−6} seconds; in order to be detected, the nucleus must survive this long. The nucleus is recorded again once its decay is registered, and the location, the energy, and the time of the decay are measured.

Stability of a nucleus is provided by the strong interaction. However, its range is very short; as nuclei become larger, its influence on the outermost nucleons (protons and neutrons) weakens. At the same time, the nucleus is torn apart by electrostatic repulsion between protons, and its range is not limited. Total binding energy provided by the strong interaction increases linearly with the number of nucleons, whereas electrostatic repulsion increases with the square of the atomic number, i.e. the latter grows faster and becomes increasingly important for heavy and superheavy nuclei. Superheavy nuclei are thus theoretically predicted and have so far been observed to predominantly decay via decay modes that are caused by such repulsion: alpha decay and spontaneous fission. (Note: Not all decay modes are caused by electrostatic repulsion. For example, beta decay is caused by the weak interaction.) Almost all alpha emitters have over 210 nucleons, and the lightest nuclide primarily undergoing spontaneous fission has 238. In both decay modes, nuclei are inhibited from decaying by corresponding energy barriers for each mode, but they can be tunneled through.

Scheme of an apparatus for creation of superheavy elements, based on the Dubna Gas-Filled Recoil Separator set up in the Flerov Laboratory of Nuclear Reactions in JINR. The trajectory within the detector and the beam focusing apparatus changes because of a dipole magnet in the former and quadrupole magnets in the latter.

Alpha particles are commonly produced in radioactive decays because the mass of an alpha particle per nucleon is small enough to leave some energy for the alpha particle to be used as kinetic energy to leave the nucleus. Spontaneous fission is caused by electrostatic repulsion tearing the nucleus apart and produces various nuclei in different instances of identical nuclei fissioning. As the atomic number increases, spontaneous fission rapidly becomes more important: spontaneous fission partial half-lives decrease by 23 orders of magnitude from uranium (element 92) to nobelium (element 102), and by 30 orders of magnitude from thorium (element 90) to fermium (element 100). The earlier liquid drop model thus suggested that spontaneous fission would occur nearly instantly due to disappearance of the fission barrier for nuclei with about 280 nucleons. The later nuclear shell model suggested that nuclei with about 300 nucleons would form an island of stability in which nuclei will be more resistant to spontaneous fission and will primarily undergo alpha decay with longer half-lives. Subsequent discoveries suggested that the predicted island might be further than originally anticipated; they also showed that nuclei intermediate between the long-lived actinides and the predicted island are deformed, and gain additional stability from shell effects. Experiments on lighter superheavy nuclei, as well as those closer to the expected island, have shown greater than previously anticipated stability against spontaneous fission, showing the importance of shell effects on nuclei. (Note: It was already known by the 1960s that ground states of nuclei differed in energy and shape as well as that certain magic numbers of nucleons corresponded to greater stability of a nucleus. However, it was assumed that there was no nuclear structure in superheavy nuclei as they were too deformed to form one.)

Alpha decays are registered by the emitted alpha particles, and the decay products are easy to determine before the actual decay; if such a decay or a series of consecutive decays produces a known nucleus, the original product of a reaction can be easily determined. (Note: Since mass of a nucleus is not measured directly but is rather calculated from that of another nucleus, such measurement is called indirect. Direct measurements are also possible, but for the most part they have remained unavailable for superheavy nuclei. The first direct measurement of mass of a superheavy nucleus was reported in 2018 at LBNL. Mass was determined from the location of a nucleus after the transfer (the location helps determine its trajectory, which is linked to the mass-to-charge ratio of the nucleus, since the transfer was done in presence of a magnet).) (That all decays within a decay chain were indeed related to each other is established by the location of these decays, which must be in the same place.) The known nucleus can be recognized by the specific characteristics of decay it undergoes such as decay energy (or more specifically, the kinetic energy of the emitted particle). (Note: If the decay occurred in a vacuum, then since total momentum of an isolated system before and after the decay must be preserved, the daughter nucleus would also receive a small velocity. The ratio of the two velocities, and accordingly the ratio of the kinetic energies, would thus be inverse to the ratio of the two masses. The decay energy equals the sum of the known kinetic energy of the alpha particle and that of the daughter nucleus (an exact fraction of the former). The calculations hold for an experiment as well, but the difference is that the nucleus does not move after the decay because it is tied to the detector.) Spontaneous fission, however, produces various nuclei as products, so the original nuclide cannot be determined from its daughters. (Note: Spontaneous fission was discovered by Soviet physicist Georgy Flerov, a leading scientist at JINR, and thus it was a "hobbyhorse" for the facility. In contrast, the LBL scientists believed fission information was not sufficient for a claim of synthesis of an element. They believed spontaneous fission had not been studied enough to use it for identification of a new element, since there was a difficulty of establishing that a compound nucleus had only ejected neutrons and not charged particles like protons or alpha particles. They thus preferred to link new isotopes to the already known ones by successive alpha decays.)

The information available to physicists aiming to synthesize a superheavy element is thus the information collected at the detectors: location, energy, and time of arrival of a particle to the detector, and those of its decay. The physicists analyze this data and seek to conclude that it was indeed caused by a new element and could not have been caused by a different nuclide than the one claimed. Often, provided data is insufficient for a conclusion that a new element was definitely created and there is no other explanation for the observed effects; errors in interpreting data have been made. (Note: For instance, element 102 was mistakenly identified in 1957 at the Nobel Institute of Physics in Stockholm, Stockholm County, Sweden. There were no earlier definitive claims of creation of this element, and the element was assigned a name by its Swedish, American, and British discoverers, nobelium. It was later shown that the identification was incorrect. The following year, RL was unable to reproduce the Swedish results and announced instead their synthesis of the element; that claim was also disproved later. JINR insisted that they were the first to create the element and suggested a name of their own for the new element, joliotium; the Soviet name was also not accepted (JINR later referred to the naming of the element 102 as "hasty"). This name was proposed to IUPAC in a written response to their ruling on priority of discovery claims of elements, signed 29 September 1992. The name "nobelium" remained unchanged on account of its widespread usage.)

== History ==
=== Pre-discovery ===
In the late 1940s to early 1960s, the early days of making heavier and heavier transuranic elements, it was predicted that since such elements did not occur naturally, they would have shorter and shorter spontaneous fission half-lives, until they stopped existing altogether around element 108 (now called hassium). Initial work in synthesizing the heavier actinides seemed to confirm this. But the nuclear shell model, introduced in 1949 and extensively developed in the late 1960s by William Myers and Władysław Świątecki, stated that protons and neutrons form shells within a nucleus, analogous to electron shells. Noble gases are unreactive due to a full electron shell; similarly, it was theorized that elements with full nuclear shells – those having "magic" numbers of protons or neutrons – would be stabilized against decay. A doubly magic isotope, with magic numbers of both protons and neutrons, would be especially stabilized. Heiner Meldner calculated in 1965 that the next doubly magic isotope after ^{208}Pb was ^{298}Fl with 114 protons and 184 neutrons, which would be the centre of an "island of stability". This island of stability, supposedly from copernicium (Z = 112) to oganesson (Z = 118), would come after a long "sea of instability" from mendelevium (Z = 101) to roentgenium (Z = 111), and the flerovium isotopes in it were speculated in 1966 to have half-lives over 10^{8} years. These early predictions fascinated researchers, and led to the first attempt to make flerovium, in 1968 with the reaction ^{248}Cm(^{40}Ar,xn). No flerovium atoms were detected; this was thought to be because the compound nucleus ^{288}Fl only has 174 neutrons instead of the supposed magic 184, and this would have significant impact on the reaction cross section (yield) and half-lives of nuclei produced. It was then 30 more years before flerovium was first made. Later work suggests the islands of stability around hassium and flerovium occur because these nuclei are respectively deformed and oblate, which make them resistant to spontaneous fission, and that the true island of stability for spherical nuclei occurs at around unbibium-306 (122 protons, 184 neutrons).

In the 1970s and 1980s, theoretical studies debated whether element 114 would be a more volatile metal like lead, or an inert gas.

=== First signs ===
The first sign of flerovium was found in December 1998 by a team of scientists at Joint Institute for Nuclear Research (JINR), Dubna, Russia, led by Armenian nuclear scientist Yuri Oganessian, who bombarded a target of plutonium-244 with accelerated nuclei of calcium-48:

^{244}_{94}Pu + ^{48}_{20}Ca → ^{292}_{114}Fl* → ^{290}_{114}Fl + 2 ^{1}_{0}n

This reaction had been tried before, without success; for this 1998 attempt, JINR had upgraded all of its equipment to detect and separate the produced atoms better and bombard the target more intensely. One atom of flerovium, alpha decaying with lifetime 30.4 s, was detected. The decay energy measured was 9.71 MeV, giving an expected half-life of 2–23 s. This observation was assigned to ^{289}Fl and was published in January 1999. The experiment was later repeated, but an isotope with these decay properties was never observed again, so the exact identity of this activity is unknown. It may have been due to the isomer ^{289m}Fl, but because the presence of a whole series of longer-lived isomers in its decay chain would be rather doubtful, the most likely assignment of this chain is to the 2n channel leading to ^{290}Fl and electron capture to ^{290}Nh. This fits well with the systematics and trends of flerovium isotopes, and is consistent with the low beam energy chosen for that experiment, though further confirmation would be desirable via synthesis of ^{294}Lv in a ^{248}Cm(^{48}Ca,2n) reaction, which would alpha decay to ^{290}Fl. The RIKEN team reported possible synthesis of ^{294}Lv and ^{290}Fl in 2016 in a ^{248}Cm(^{48}Ca,2n) reaction, but the alpha decay of ^{294}Lv was missed, alpha decay of ^{290}Fl to ^{286}Cn was observed instead of electron capture to ^{290}Nh, and the assignment to ^{294}Lv instead of ^{293}Lv was not certain.

Glenn T. Seaborg, a scientist at Lawrence Berkeley National Laboratory who had been involved in work to make such superheavy elements, had said in December 1997 that "one of his longest-lasting and most cherished dreams was to see one of these magic elements"; he was told of the synthesis of flerovium by his colleague Albert Ghiorso soon after its publication in 1999. Ghiorso later recalled:

I wanted Glenn to know, so I went to his bedside and told him. I thought I saw a gleam in his eye, but the next day when I went to visit him he didn't remember seeing me. As a scientist, he had died when he had that stroke.

— Albert Ghiorso

Seaborg died two months later, on 25 February 1999.

In March 1999, the same team replaced the ^{244}Pu target with ^{242}Pu to make other flerovium isotopes. Two atoms of flerovium were produced as a result, each alpha-decaying with a half-life of 5.5 s. They were assigned as ^{287}Fl. This activity has not been seen again either, and it is unclear what nucleus was produced. It is possible that it was an isomer ^{287m}Fl or from electron capture by ^{287}Fl, leading to ^{287}Nh and ^{283}Rg.

=== Confirmed discovery ===
The now-confirmed discovery of flerovium was made in June 1999 when the Dubna team repeated the first reaction from 1998. This time, two atoms of flerovium were produced; they alpha decayed with half-life 2.6 s, different from the 1998 result. This activity was initially assigned to ^{288}Fl in error, due to the confusion regarding the previous observations that were assumed to come from ^{289}Fl. Further work in December 2002 finally allowed a positive reassignment of the June 1999 atoms to ^{289}Fl.

In May 2009, the Joint Working Party (JWP) of IUPAC published a report on the discovery of copernicium in which they acknowledged discovery of the isotope ^{283}Cn. This implied the discovery of flerovium, from the acknowledgement of the data for the synthesis of ^{287}Fl and ^{291}Lv, which decay to ^{283}Cn. The discovery of flerovium-286 and -287 was confirmed in January 2009 at Berkeley. This was followed by confirmation of flerovium-288 and -289 in July 2009 at Gesellschaft für Schwerionenforschung (GSI) in Germany. In 2011, IUPAC evaluated the Dubna team's 1999–2007 experiments. They found the early data inconclusive, but accepted the results of 2004–2007 as flerovium, and the element was officially recognized as having been discovered.

=== Isotopes ===
List of flerovium isotopes
Isotope	Half-life (Note: Different sources give different values for half-lives; the most recently published values are listed.)		Decay mode	Discovery year	Discovery reaction
Isotope	Value	ref	Decay mode	Discovery year	Discovery reaction
^{284}Fl	2.5 ms		SF, α	2015	^{240}Pu(^{48}Ca,4n)^{239}Pu(^{48}Ca,3n)
^{285}Fl	100 ms		α	2010	^{242}Pu(^{48}Ca,5n)
^{286}Fl	105 ms		α, SF	2004	^{290}Lv(—,α)
^{287}Fl	360 ms		α, EC?	2004	^{244}Pu(^{48}Ca,5n)
^{288}Fl	660 ms		α	2004	^{244}Pu(^{48}Ca,4n)
^{289}Fl	1.9 s		α	2004	^{244}Pu(^{48}Ca,3n)
^{289m}Fl (Note: This isotope is unconfirmed)	1.1 s		α	2012	^{293}Lv(—,α)
^{290}Fl	19 s		α, EC?	(2016)	^{244}Pu(^{48}Ca,2n)

While the method of chemical characterization of a daughter was successful for flerovium and livermorium, and the simpler structure of even–even nuclei made confirmation of oganesson (Z = 118) straightforward, there have been difficulties in establishing the congruence of decay chains from isotopes with odd protons, odd neutrons, or both. To get around this problem with hot fusion, the decay chains from which terminate in spontaneous fission instead of connecting to known nuclei as cold fusion allows, experiments were done in Dubna in 2015 to produce lighter isotopes of flerovium by reaction of ^{48}Ca with ^{239}Pu and ^{240}Pu, particularly ^{283}Fl, ^{284}Fl, and ^{285}Fl; the last had previously been characterized in the ^{242}Pu(^{48}Ca,5n)^{285}Fl reaction at Lawrence Berkeley National Laboratory in 2010. ^{285}Fl was more clearly characterized, while the new isotope ^{284}Fl was found to undergo immediate spontaneous fission, and ^{283}Fl was not observed. This lightest isotope may yet conceivably be produced in the cold fusion reaction ^{208}Pb(^{76}Ge,n)^{283}Fl, which the team at RIKEN in Japan at one point considered investigating: this reaction is expected to have a higher cross-section of 200 fb than the "world record" low of 30 fb for ^{209}Bi(^{70}Zn,n)^{278}Nh, the reaction which RIKEN used for the official discovery of element 113 (nihonium). Alternatively, it might be produced in future as a great-granddaughter of ^{295}120, reachable in the ^{249}Cf(^{50}Ti,4n) reaction. The reaction ^{239}Pu+^{48}Ca has also been suggested as a means to produce ^{282}Fl and ^{283}Fl in the 5n and 4n channels respectively, but so far only the 3n channel leading to ^{284}Fl has been observed.

The Dubna team repeated their investigation of the ^{240}Pu+^{48}Ca reaction in 2017, observing three new consistent decay chains of ^{285}Fl, another decay chain from this nuclide that may pass through some isomeric states in its daughters, a chain that could be assigned to ^{287}Fl (likely from ^{242}Pu impurities in the target), and some spontaneous fissions of which some could be from ^{284}Fl, though other interpretations including side reactions involving evaporation of charged particles are also possible. The alpha decay of ^{284}Fl to spontaneously fissioning ^{280}Cn was finally observed by the Dubna team in 2024.

=== Naming ===
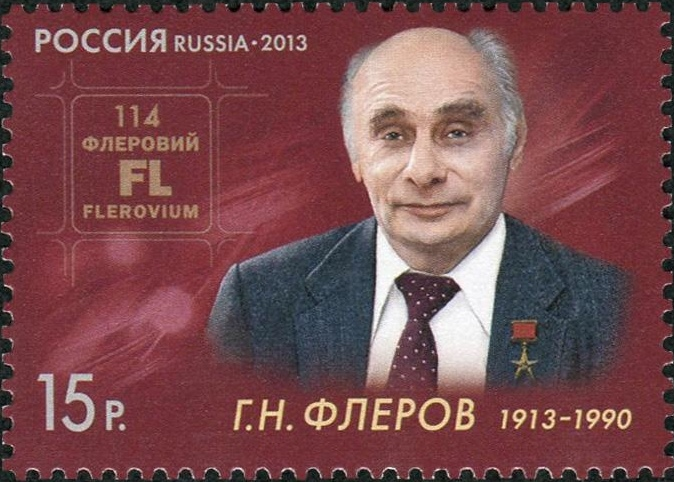
Stamp of Russia, issued in 2013, dedicated to Georgy Flyorov and flerovium

Per Mendeleev's nomenclature for unnamed and undiscovered elements, flerovium is sometimes called eka-lead. In 1979, IUPAC published recommendations according to which the element was to be called ununquadium (symbol Uuq), a systematic element name as a placeholder, until the discovery of the element is confirmed and a permanent name is decided on. Most scientists in the field called it "element 114", with the symbol of E114, (114) or 114.

Per IUPAC recommendations, the discoverer(s) of a new element has the right to suggest a name. After IUPAC recognized the discovery of flerovium and livermorium on 1 June 2011, IUPAC asked the discovery team at JINR to suggest permanent names for the two elements. The Dubna team chose the name flerovium (symbol Fl), (Note: In the 19th century, the symbol "Fl" had been used to represent fluorine, before standardizing on the modern "F".) after Russia's Flerov Laboratory of Nuclear Reactions (FLNR), named after Soviet physicist Georgy Flyorov (also spelled Flerov); earlier reports claim the element name was directly proposed to honour Flyorov. In accordance with the proposal received from the discoverers, IUPAC officially named flerovium after Flerov Laboratory of Nuclear Reactions, not after Flyorov himself. Flyorov is known for writing to Joseph Stalin in April 1942 and pointing out the silence in scientific journals in the field of nuclear fission in the United States, Great Britain, and Germany. Flyorov deduced that this research must have become classified information in those countries. Flyorov's work and urgings led to the development of the USSR's own atomic bomb project. Flyorov is also known for the discovery of spontaneous fission with Konstantin Petrzhak. IUPAC approved the name in May, 2012 and the naming ceremony for flerovium and livermorium was held on 24 October 2012 in Moscow.

Other proposals included atlantisium (An, a reference via Atlantis to the island of stability), lazarevium (Lz, in honor of Yuri Lazarev), and oganessium (Og, in honor of Yuri Oganessian).

In a 2015 interview with Oganessian, the host, in preparation to ask a question, said, "You said you had dreamed to name [an element] after your teacher Georgy Flyorov." Without letting the host finish, Oganessian repeatedly said, "I did."

== Predicted properties ==
Very few properties of flerovium or its compounds have been measured; due to its extremely limited and expensive production and the fact that it decays very quickly. A few singular properties have been measured, but for the most part, properties of flerovium remain unknown and only predictions are available.

=== Nuclear stability and isotopes ===
Regions of differently shaped nuclei, as predicted by the interacting boson model

The basis of the chemical periodicity in the periodic table is the electron shell closure at each noble gas (atomic numbers 2, 10, 18, 36, 54, 86, and 118): as any further electrons must enter a new shell with higher energy, closed-shell electron configurations are markedly more stable, hence the inertness of noble gases. Protons and neutrons are also known to form closed nuclear shells, so the same happens at nucleon shell closures, which happen at specific nucleon numbers often dubbed "magic numbers". The known magic numbers are 2, 8, 20, 28, 50, and 82 for protons and neutrons, as well as 126 for neutrons. Nuclei with magic proton and neutron numbers, such as helium-4, oxygen-16, calcium-48, and lead-208, are "doubly magic" and relatively stable for their number of nucleons. This stability is very important for superheavy elements: with no stabilization, half-lives would be expected by exponential extrapolation to be nanoseconds at darmstadtium (element 110), because the ever-increasing electrostatic repulsion between protons overcomes the limited-range strong nuclear force that holds nuclei together. The next closed nucleon shells (magic numbers) are thought to denote the centre of the long-sought island of stability, where half-lives to alpha decay and spontaneous fission lengthen again.

Orbitals with high azimuthal quantum number are raised in energy, eliminating what would otherwise be a gap in orbital energy corresponding to a closed proton shell at element 114. This raises the next proton shell to the region around element 120.

Initially, by analogy with neutron magic number 126, the next proton shell was also expected at element 126, too far beyond the synthesis capabilities of the mid-20th century to get much theoretical attention. In 1966, new values for the potential and spin–orbit interaction in this region of the periodic table contradicted this and predicted that the next proton shell would instead be at element 114, and that nuclei in this region would be relatively stable against spontaneous fission. The expected closed neutron shells in this region were at neutron number 184 or 196, making ^{298}Fl and ^{310}Fl candidates for being doubly magic. 1972 estimates predicted a half-life of around 1 year for ^{298}Fl, which was expected to be near an island of stability centered near ^{294}Ds (with a half-life around 10^{10} years, comparable to ^{232}Th). After making the first isotopes of elements 112–118 at the turn of the 21st century, it was found that these neutron-deficient isotopes were stabilized against fission. In 2008 it was thus hypothesized that the stabilization against fission of these nuclides was due to their oblate nuclei, and that a region of oblate nuclei was centred on ^{288}Fl. Also, new theoretical models showed that the expected energy gap between the proton orbitals 2f_{7/2} (filled at element 114) and 2f_{5/2} (filled at element 120) was smaller than expected, so element 114 no longer appeared to be a stable spherical closed nuclear shell. The next doubly magic nucleus is now expected to be around ^{306}Ubb, but this nuclide's expected short half-life and low production cross section make its synthesis challenging. Still, the island of stability is expected to exist in this region, and nearer its centre (which has not been approached closely enough yet) some nuclides, such as ^{291}Mc and its alpha- and beta-decay daughters, (Note: Specifically, ^{291}Mc, ^{291}Fl, ^{291}Nh, ^{287}Nh, ^{287}Cn, ^{287}Rg, ^{283}Rg, and ^{283}Ds, which are expected to decay to the relatively longer-lived nuclei ^{283}Mt, ^{287}Ds, and ^{291}Cn.) may be found to decay by positron emission or electron capture and thus move into the centre of the island. Due to the expected high fission barriers, any nucleus in this island of stability would decay exclusively by alpha decay and perhaps some electron capture and beta decay, both of which would bring the nuclei closer to the beta-stability line where the island is expected to be. Electron capture is needed to reach the island, which is problematic because it is not certain that electron capture is a major decay mode in this region of the chart of nuclides.

Experiments were done in 2000–2004 at Flerov Laboratory of Nuclear Reactions in Dubna studying the fission properties of the compound nucleus ^{292}Fl by bombarding ^{244}Pu with accelerated ^{48}Ca ions. A compound nucleus is a loose combination of nucleons that have not yet arranged themselves into nuclear shells. It has no internal structure and is held together only by the collision forces between the two nuclei. (Note: It is estimated that it requires around 10^{−14} s for the nucleons to arrange themselves into nuclear shells, at which point the compound nucleus becomes a nuclide, and this number is used by IUPAC as the minimum half-life a claimed isotope must have to be recognized as a nuclide.) Results showed how such nuclei fission mainly by expelling doubly magic or nearly doubly magic fragments such as ^{40}Ca, ^{132}Sn, ^{208}Pb, or ^{209}Bi. It was also found that ^{48}Ca and ^{58}Fe projectiles had a similar yield for the fusion-fission pathway, suggesting possible future use of ^{58}Fe projectiles in making superheavy elements. It has also been suggested that a neutron-rich flerovium isotope can be formed by quasifission (partial fusion followed by fission) of a massive nucleus. Recently it has been shown that multi-nucleon transfer reactions in collisions of actinide nuclei (such as uranium and curium) might be used to make neutron-rich superheavy nuclei in the island of stability, though production of neutron-rich nobelium or seaborgium is more likely.

Theoretical estimates of alpha decay half-lives of flerovium isotopes, support the experimental data. The fission-survived isotope ^{298}Fl, long expected to be doubly magic, is predicted to have alpha decay half-life ~17 days. Making ^{298}Fl directly by a fusion–evaporation pathway is currently impossible: no known combination of target and stable projectile can give 184 neutrons for the compound nucleus, and radioactive projectiles such as ^{50}Ca (half-life 14 s) cannot yet be used in the needed quantity and intensity. One possibility for making the theorized long-lived nuclei of copernicium (^{291}Cn and ^{293}Cn) and flerovium near the middle of the island, is using even heavier targets such as ^{250}Cm, ^{249}Bk, ^{251}Cf, and ^{254}Es, that when fused with ^{48}Ca would yield isotopes such as ^{291}Mc and ^{291}Fl (as decay products of ^{299}Uue, ^{295}Ts, and ^{295}Lv), which may have just enough neutrons to alpha decay to nuclides close enough to the centre of the island to possibly undergo electron capture and move inward to the centre. However, reaction cross sections would be small and little is yet known about the decay properties of superheavies near the beta-stability line. This may be the current best hope to synthesize nuclei in the island of stability, but it is speculative and may or may not work in practice. Another possibility is to use controlled nuclear explosions to get the high neutron flux needed to make macroscopic amounts of such isotopes. This would mimic the r-process where the actinides were first produced in nature and the gap of instability after polonium bypassed, as it would bypass the gaps of instability at ^{258-260}Fm and at mass number 275 (atomic numbers 104 to 108). Some such isotopes (especially ^{291}Cn and ^{293}Cn) may even have been synthesized in nature, but would decay far too quickly (with half-lives of only thousands of years) and be produced in far too small quantities (~10^{−12} the abundance of lead) to be detectable today outside cosmic rays.

=== Atomic and physical ===
Flerovium is in group 14 in the periodic table, below carbon, silicon, germanium, tin, and lead. Every previous group 14 element has 4 electrons in its valence shell, hence valence electron configuration ns^{2}np^{2}. For flerovium, the trend will continue and the valence electron configuration is predicted as 7s^{2}7p^{2}; flerovium will be similar to its lighter congeners in many ways. Differences are likely to arise; a large contributor is spin–orbit (SO) interaction—mutual interaction between the electrons' motion and spin. It is especially strong in superheavy elements, because the electrons move faster than in lighter atoms, at speeds comparable to the speed of light. For flerovium, it lowers the 7s and the 7p electron energy levels (stabilizing the corresponding electrons), but two of the 7p electron energy levels are stabilized more than the other four. The stabilization of the 7s electrons is called the inert pair effect, and the effect "tearing" the 7p subshell into the more and less stabilized parts is called subshell splitting. Computational chemists see the split as a change of the second (azimuthal) quantum number ℓ from 1 to 1/2 and 3/2 for the more stabilized and less stabilized parts of the 7p subshell, respectively. (Note: The quantum number corresponds to the letter in the electron orbital name: 0 to s, 1 to p, 2 to d, etc. See azimuthal quantum number for more information.) For many theoretical purposes, the valence electron configuration may be represented to reflect the 7p subshell split as 7s^{2}7p^{2}_{1/2}. These effects cause flerovium's chemistry to be somewhat different from that of its lighter neighbours.

Because the spin–orbit splitting of the 7p subshell is very large in flerovium, and both of flerovium's filled orbitals in the 7th shell are stabilized relativistically; the valence electron configuration of flerovium may be considered to have a completely filled shell. Its first ionization energy of 8.539 eV (823.9 kJ/mol) should be the second-highest in group 14. The 6d electron levels are also destabilized, leading to some early speculations that they may be chemically active, though newer work suggests this is unlikely. Because the first ionization energy is higher than in silicon and germanium, though still lower than in carbon, it has been suggested that flerovium could be classed as a metalloid.

Flerovium's closed-shell electron configuration means metallic bonding in metallic flerovium is weaker than in the elements before and after; so flerovium is expected to have a low boiling point, and has recently been suggested to be possibly a gaseous metal, similar to predictions for copernicium, which also has a closed-shell electron configuration. Flerovium's melting and boiling points were predicted in the 1970s to be around 70 and 150 °C, significantly lower than for the lighter group 14 elements (lead has 327 and 1749 °C), and continuing the trend of decreasing boiling points down the group. Earlier studies predicted a boiling point of ~1000 °C or 2840 °C, but this is now considered unlikely because of the expected weak metallic bonding and that group trends would expect flerovium to have low sublimation enthalpy. Preliminary 2021 calculations predicted that flerovium should have melting point −73 °C (lower than mercury at −39 °C and copernicium, predicted 10 ± 11 °C) and boiling point 107 °C, which would make it a liquid metal. Like mercury, radon, and copernicium, but not lead and oganesson (eka-radon), flerovium is calculated to have no electron affinity.

A 2010 study published calculations predicting a hexagonal close-packed crystal structure for flerovium due to spin–orbit coupling effects, and a density of 9.928 g/cm^{3}, though this was noted to be probably slightly too low. Newer calculations published in 2017 expected flerovium to crystallize in face-centred cubic crystal structure like its lighter congener lead, and calculations published in 2022 predicted a density of 11.4 ± 0.3 g/cm^{3}, similar to lead (11.34 g/cm^{3}). These calculations found that the face-centred cubic and hexagonal close-packed structures should have nearly the same energy, a phenomenon reminiscent of the noble gases. These calculations predict that hexagonal close-packed flerovium should be a semiconductor, with a band gap of 0.8 ± 0.3 eV. (Copernicium is also predicted to be a semiconductor.) These calculations predict that the cohesive energy of flerovium should be around −0.5 ± 0.1 eV; this is similar to that predicted for oganesson (−0.45 eV), larger than that predicted for copernicium (−0.38 eV), but smaller than that of mercury (−0.79 eV). The melting point was calculated as 284 ± 50 K (11 ± 50 °C), so that flerovium is probably a liquid at room temperature, although the boiling point was not determined.

The electron of a hydrogen-like flerovium ion (Fl^{113+}; remove all but one electron) is expected to move so fast that its mass is 1.79 times that of a stationary electron, due to relativistic effects. (The figures for hydrogen-like lead and tin are expected to be 1.25 and 1.073 respectively.) Flerovium would form weaker metal–metal bonds than lead and would be adsorbed less on surfaces.

=== Chemical ===
Flerovium is the heaviest known member of group 14, below lead, and is projected to be the second member of the 7p series of elements. Nihonium and flerovium are expected to form a very short subperiod corresponding to the filling of the 7p_{1/2} orbital, coming between the filling of the 6d_{5/2} and 7p_{3/2} subshells. Their chemical behaviour is expected to be very distinctive: nihonium's homology to thallium has been called "doubtful" by computational chemists, while flerovium's to lead has been called only "formal".

The first five group 14 members show a +4 oxidation state and the latter members have increasingly prominent +2 chemistry due to onset of the inert pair effect. For tin, the +2 and +4 states are similar in stability, and lead(II) is the most stable of all the chemically well-understood +2 oxidation states in group 14. The 7s orbitals are very highly stabilized in flerovium, so a very large sp^{3} orbital hybridization is needed to achieve a +4 oxidation state, so flerovium is expected to be even more stable than lead in its strongly predominant +2 oxidation state and its +4 oxidation state should be highly unstable. For example, the dioxide (FlO_{2}) is expected to be highly unstable to decomposition into its constituent elements (and would not be formed by direct reaction of flerovium with oxygen), and flerovane (FlH_{4}), which should have Fl–H bond lengths of 1.787 Å and would be the heaviest homologue of methane (the lighter compounds include silane, germane and stannane), is predicted to be more thermodynamically unstable than plumbane, spontaneously decomposing to flerovium(II) hydride (FlH_{2}) and H_{2}. The tetrafluoride FlF_{4} would have bonding mostly due to sd hybridizations rather than sp^{3} hybridizations, and its decomposition to the difluoride and fluorine gas would be exothermic. The other tetrahalides (for example, FlCl_{4} is destabilized by about 400 kJ/mol) decompose similarly. The corresponding polyfluoride anion FlF_{6}^{2−} should be unstable to hydrolysis in aqueous solution, and flerovium(II) polyhalide anions such as FlBr_{3}^{−} and FlI_{3}^{−} are predicted to form preferentially in solutions. The sd hybridizations were suggested in early calculations, as flerovium's 7s and 6d electrons share about the same energy, which would allow a volatile hexafluoride to form, but later calculations do not confirm this possibility. In general, spin–orbit contraction of the 7p_{1/2} orbital should lead to smaller bond lengths and larger bond angles: this has been theoretically confirmed in FlH_{2}. Still, even FlH_{2} should be relativistically destabilized by 2.6 eV (250 kJ/mol) to below Fl+H_{2}; the large spin–orbit effects also break down the usual singlet–triplet divide in the group 14 dihydrides. FlF_{2} and FlCl_{2} are predicted to be more stable than FlH_{2}.

Due to relativistic stabilization of flerovium's 7s^{2}7p^{2}_{1/2} valence electron configuration, the 0 oxidation state should also be more stable for flerovium than for lead, as the 7p_{1/2} electrons begin to also have a mild inert pair effect: this stabilization of the neutral state may bring about some similarities between the behavior of flerovium and the noble gas radon. Due to flerovium's expected relative inertness, diatomic compounds FlH and FlF should have lower energies of dissociation than the corresponding lead compounds PbH and PbF. Flerovium(IV) should be even more electronegative than lead(IV); lead(IV) has electronegativity 2.33 on the Pauling scale, though the lead(II) value is only 1.87. Flerovium could be a noble metal.

Flerovium(II) should be more stable than lead(II), and halides FlX^{+}, FlX_{2}, FlX_{3}^{−}, and FlX_{4}^{2−} (X = Cl, Br, I) are expected to form readily. The fluorides would undergo strong hydrolysis in aqueous solution. All flerovium dihalides are expected to be stable; the difluoride being water-soluble. Spin–orbit effects would destabilize the dihydride (FlH_{2}) by almost 2.6 eV (250 kJ/mol). In aqueous solution, the oxyanion flerovite (FlO_{2}^{2−}) would also form, analogous to plumbite. Flerovium(II) sulfate (FlSO_{4}) and sulfide (FlS) should be very insoluble in water, and flerovium(II) acetate (Fl(C_{2}H_{3}O_{2})_{2}) and nitrate (Fl(NO_{3})_{2}) should be quite water-soluble. The standard electrode potential for reduction of Fl^{2+} ion to metallic flerovium is estimated to be around +0.9 V, confirming the increased stability of flerovium in the neutral state. In general, due to relativistic stabilization of the 7p_{1/2} spinor, Fl^{2+} is expected to have properties intermediate between those of Hg^{2+} or Cd^{2+} and its lighter congener Pb^{2+}.

== Experimental chemistry ==
Flerovium's chemistry has been experimentally investigated, though studies so far are not conclusive. Flerovium's volatility has been measured through interactions with a gold surface, indicating that the volatility of flerovium was comparable to that of mercury and astatine. This volatile behavior was not expected for a usual group 14 metal.

In experiments in 2012 at GSI, flerovium's chemistry was found to be more metallic than noble-gas-like. Jens Volker Kratz and Christoph Düllmann specifically named copernicium and flerovium as being in a new category of "volatile metals"; Kratz even speculated that they might be gases at standard temperature and pressure. These "volatile metals", as a category, were expected to fall between normal metals and noble gases in terms of adsorption properties. Interactions of flerovium and copernicium with gold were about the same. Further studies showed that flerovium was more reactive than copernicium, in contradiction to previous experiments and predictions.

In a 2014 paper detailing the experimental results of the chemical characterization of flerovium, the GSI group wrote: "[flerovium] is the least reactive element in the group, but still a metal." Nevertheless, in a 2016 conference about chemistry and physics of heavy and superheavy elements, Alexander Yakushev and Robert Eichler, two scientists who had been active at GSI and FLNR in determining flerovium's chemistry, still urged caution based on the inconsistencies of the various experiments previously listed, noting that the question of whether flerovium was a metal or a noble gas was still open with the known evidence: one study suggested a weak noble-gas-like interaction between flerovium and gold, while the other suggested a stronger metallic interaction. The longer-lived isotope ^{289}Fl has been considered of interest for future radiochemical studies.

Experiments published in 2022 suggest that flerovium is a metal, exhibiting lower reactivity towards gold than mercury, but higher reactivity than radon. The experiments could not identify if the adsorption was due to elemental flerovium (considered more likely), or if it was due to a flerovium compound such as FlO that was more reactive towards gold than elemental flerovium, but both scenarios involve flerovium forming chemical bonds.

== See also ==
- Island of stability: Flerovium–Unbinilium–Unbihexium
- Isotopes of flerovium
- Extended periodic table

== Bibliography ==
- Audi, G.; Kondev, F. G.; Wang, M.; et al. (2017). "The NUBASE2016 evaluation of nuclear properties". Chinese Physics C. 41 (3). 030001. Bibcode:2017ChPhC..41c0001A. doi:10.1088/1674-1137/41/3/030001.
  - pp. 030001-1–030001-17
  - pp. 030001-18–030001-138, Table I. The NUBASE2016 table of nuclear and decay properties
- Beiser, A. (2003). Concepts of modern physics (6th ed.). McGraw-Hill. ISBN 978-0-07-244848-1. OCLC 48965418.
- Hoffman, D. C.; Ghiorso, A.; Seaborg, G. T. (2000). The Transuranium People: The Inside Story. World Scientific. ISBN 978-1-78-326244-1.
- Kragh, H. (2018). From Transuranic to Superheavy Elements: A Story of Dispute and Creation. Springer. ISBN 978-3-319-75813-8.
- Zagrebaev, V.; Karpov, A.; Greiner, W. (2013). "Future of superheavy element research: Which nuclei could be synthesized within the next few years?". Journal of Physics: Conference Series. 420 (1) 012001. arXiv:1207.5700. Bibcode:2013JPhCS.420a2001Z. doi:10.1088/1742-6596/420/1/012001. ISSN 1742-6588. S2CID 55434734.
- Barysz, M.; Ishikawa, Y., eds. (2010). Relativisic Methods for Chemists. Springer. ISBN 978-1-4020-9974-8.

- Thayer, J. S. (2010). "Relativistic Effects and the Chemistry of the Heavier Main Group Elements". Relativistic Methods for Chemists. Challenges and Advances in Computational Chemistry and Physics. Vol. 10. pp. 63–97. doi:10.1007/978-1-4020-9975-5_2. ISBN 978-1-4020-9974-8.
- Stysziński, J. (2010). Why do we need relativistic computational methods?. p. 99.
- Pershina, V. (2010). Electronic structure and chemistry of the heaviest elements. p. 450.
