= Isotopes of copernicium =

Isotopes of copernicium (_{112}Cn)
Main isotopes			Decay	
Isotope	abundance	half-life (t_{1/2})	mode	product
^{283}Cn	synth	3.81 s	α96%	^{279}Ds
^{283}Cn	synth	3.81 s	SF4%	–
^{283}Cn	synth	3.81 s	ε?	^{283}Rg
^{285}Cn	synth	28 s	α	^{281}Ds
^{286}Cn	synth	8.4 s?	SF	–

Copernicium (_{112}Cn) is a synthetic element, and thus a standard atomic weight cannot be given. Like all synthetic elements, it has no stable isotopes. The first isotope to be synthesized was ^{277}Cn in 1996. There are seven known radioisotopes (with one more unconfirmed); the longest-lived isotope is ^{285}Cn with a half-life of 28 seconds.

== List of isotopes ==
Nuclide	Z	N	Isotopic mass (Da) (Note: ( ) – Uncertainty (1σ) is given in concise form in parentheses after the corresponding last digits.) (Note: # – Atomic mass marked #: value and uncertainty derived not from purely experimental data, but at least partly from trends from the Mass Surface (TMS).)	Discovery year	Half-life	Decay mode (Note: Modes of decay: EC: / Electron capture; SF: / Spontaneous fission)	Daughter isotope	Spin and parity (Note: # – Values marked # are not purely derived from experimental data, but at least partly from trends of neighboring nuclides (TNN).)
^{277}Cn	112	165	277.16354(17)#	1996	610+460 −180 μs [790(330) μs]	α	^{273}Ds	3/2+#
^{280}Cn (Note: Not directly synthesized, created as decay product of ^{288}Lv)	112	168	280.16710(63)#	2025	10+18 −4 μs	SF	(various)	0+
^{281}Cn (Note: Not directly synthesized, created as decay product of ^{285}Fl)	112	169	281.16956(43)#	2010	160+80 −40 ms	α	^{277}Ds	3/2+#
^{282}Cn	112	170	282.17051(59)#	2004	0.83+0.18 −0.13 ms	SF	(various)	0+
^{283}Cn	112	171	283.17320(66)#	2004	3.81+0.45 −0.36 s	α (96%)	^{279}Ds	
^{283}Cn	112	171	283.17320(66)#	2004	3.81+0.45 −0.36 s	SF (4%)	(various)	
^{283}Cn	112	171	283.17320(66)#	2004	3.81+0.45 −0.36 s	EC?	^{283}Rg	
^{284}Cn (Note: Not directly synthesized, created as decay product of ^{288}Fl)	112	172	284.17436(82)#	2004	121+20 −15 ms	SF (98%)	(various)	0+
^{284}Cn	112	172	284.17436(82)#	2004	121+20 −15 ms	α (2%)	^{280}Ds	0+
^{285}Cn (Note: Not directly synthesized, created as decay product of ^{289}Fl)	112	173	285.17723(54)#	2004	28+9 −6 s [30(8) s]	α	^{281}Ds	5/2+#
^{285m}Cn (Note: Discovery of this isomer is unconfirmed)	530(270)# keV			2012	15±12 s	α	^{281m}Ds	
^{286}Cn (Note: Not directly synthesized, created as decay product of ^{290}Fl and ^{294}Lv) (Note: Discovery of this isotope is unconfirmed)	112	174	286.17869(75)#	(2016)	8.4+40.5 −3.9 s [30(30) s]	SF	(various)	0+
^{286}Cn	112	174	286.17869(75)#	(2016)	8.4+40.5 −3.9 s [30(30) s]	α	^{282}Ds	0+
This table header & footer:

== Isotopes and nuclear properties ==
=== Nucleosynthesis ===
Superheavy elements such as copernicium are produced by bombarding lighter elements in particle accelerators that induces fusion reactions. Whereas most of the isotopes of copernicium can be synthesized directly this way, some heavier ones have only been observed as decay products of elements with higher atomic numbers.

Depending on the energies involved, the former are separated into "hot" and "cold". In hot fusion reactions, very light, high-energy projectiles are accelerated toward very heavy targets such as actinides, giving rise to compound nuclei at high excitation energy (~40–50 MeV) that may either fission or evaporate several (3 to 5) neutrons. In cold fusion reactions, the produced fused nuclei have a relatively low excitation energy (~10–20 MeV), which decreases the probability that these products will undergo fission reactions. As the fused nuclei cool to the ground state, they require emission of only one or two neutrons, and thus, allows for the generation of more neutron-rich products. The latter is a distinct concept from that of where nuclear fusion claimed to be achieved at room temperature conditions (see cold fusion).

The table below contains various combinations of targets and projectiles which could be used to form compound nuclei with Z = 112.

Target	Projectile	CN	Attempt result
^{184}W	^{88}Sr	^{272}Cn	Failure to date
^{208}Pb	^{68}Zn	^{276}Cn	Failure to date
^{208}Pb	^{70}Zn	^{278}Cn	Successful reaction
^{233}U	^{48}Ca	^{281}Cn	Failure to date
^{234}U	^{48}Ca	^{282}Cn	Reaction yet to be attempted
^{235}U	^{48}Ca	^{283}Cn	Reaction yet to be attempted
^{236}U	^{48}Ca	^{284}Cn	Reaction yet to be attempted
^{238}U	^{48}Ca	^{286}Cn	Successful reaction
^{244}Pu	^{40}Ar	^{284}Cn	Reaction yet to be attempted
^{250}Cm	^{36}S	^{286}Cn	Reaction yet to be attempted
^{248}Cm	^{36}S	^{284}Cn	Reaction yet to be attempted
^{252}Cf	^{30}Si	^{282}Cn	Reaction yet to be attempted

==== Cold fusion ====
The first cold fusion reaction to produce copernicium was performed by GSI in 1996, who reported the detection of two decay chains of copernicium-277.

^{208}_{82}Pb + ^{70}_{30}Zn → ^{277}_{112}Cn + n

In a review of the data in 2000, the first decay chain was retracted. In a repeat of the reaction in 2000 they were able to synthesize a further atom. They attempted to measure the 1n excitation function in 2002 but suffered from a failure of the zinc-70 beam. The unofficial discovery of copernicium-277 was confirmed in 2004 at RIKEN, where researchers detected a further two atoms of the isotope and were able to confirm the decay data for the entire chain. This reaction had also previously been tried in 1971 at the Joint Institute for Nuclear Research in Dubna, Russia in an effort to produce ^{276}Cn in the 2n channel, but without success.

After the successful synthesis of copernicium-277, the GSI team performed a reaction using a ^{68}Zn projectile in 1997 in an effort to study the effect of isospin (neutron richness) on the chemical yield.

^{208}_{82}Pb + ^{68}_{30}Zn → ^{276−x}_{112}Cn + x n

The experiment was initiated after the discovery of a yield enhancement during the synthesis of darmstadtium isotopes using nickel-62 and nickel-64 ions. No decay chains of copernicium-275 were detected leading to a cross section limit of 1.2 picobarns (pb). However, the revision of the yield for the zinc-70 reaction to 0.5 pb does not rule out a similar yield for this reaction.

In 1990, after some early indications for the formation of isotopes of copernicium in the irradiation of a tungsten target with multi-GeV protons, a collaboration between GSI and the Hebrew University studied the foregoing reaction.

^{184}_{74}W + ^{88}_{38}Sr → ^{272−x}_{112}Cn + x n

They were able to detect some spontaneous fission (SF) activity and a 12.5 MeV alpha decay, both of which they tentatively assigned to the radiative capture product copernicium-272 or the 1n evaporation residue copernicium-271. Both the TWG and JWP have concluded that a lot more research is required to confirm these conclusions.

==== Hot fusion ====
In 1998, the team at the Flerov Laboratory of Nuclear Research (FLNR) in Dubna, Russia began a research program using calcium-48 nuclei in "warm" fusion reactions leading to super-heavy elements. In March 1998, they claimed to have synthesized two atoms of the element in the following reaction.

^{238}_{92}U + ^{48}_{20}Ca → ^{286−x}_{112}Cn + x n (x=3,4)

The product, copernicium-283, had a claimed half-life of 5 minutes, decaying by spontaneous fission.

The long half-life of the product initiated first chemical experiments on the gas phase atomic chemistry of copernicium. In 2000, Yuri Yukashev in Dubna repeated the experiment but was unable to observe any spontaneous fission events with half-life of 5 minutes. The experiment was repeated in 2001 and an accumulation of eight fragments resulting from spontaneous fission were found in the low-temperature section, indicating that copernicium had radon-like properties. However, there is now some serious doubt about the origin of these results. To confirm the synthesis, the reaction was successfully repeated by the same team in January 2003, confirming the decay mode and half-life. They were also able to calculate an estimate of the mass of the spontaneous fission activity to ~285, lending support to the assignment.

The team at Lawrence Berkeley National Laboratory (LBNL) in Berkeley, United States entered the debate and performed the reaction in 2002. They were unable to detect any spontaneous fission and calculated a cross section limit of 1.6 pb for the detection of a single event.

The reaction was repeated in 2003–2004 by the team at Dubna using a slightly different set-up, the Dubna Gas-Filled Recoil Separator (DGFRS). This time, copernicium-283 was found to decay by emission of a 9.53 MeV alpha-particle with a half-life of 4 seconds. Copernicium-282 was also observed in the 4n channel (emitting 4 neutrons).

In 2003, the team at GSI entered the debate and performed a search for the five-minute SF activity in chemical experiments. Like the Dubna team, they were able to detect seven SF fragments in the low temperature section. However, these SF events were uncorrelated, suggesting they were not from actual direct SF of copernicium nuclei and raised doubts about the original indications for radon-like properties. After the announcement from Dubna of different decay properties for copernicium-283, the GSI team repeated the experiment in September 2004. They were unable to detect any SF events and calculated a cross section limit of ~1.6 pb for the detection of one event, not in contradiction with the reported 2.5 pb yield by Dubna team.

In May 2005, the GSI performed a physical experiment and identified a single atom of ^{283}Cn decaying by SF with a short half-time suggesting a previously unknown SF branch. However, initial work by Dubna team had detected several direct SF events but had assumed that the parent alpha decay had been missed. These results indicated that this was not the case.

The new decay data on copernicium-283 were confirmed in 2006 by a joint PSI–FLNR experiment aimed at probing the chemical properties of copernicium. Two atoms of copernicium-283 were observed in the decay of the parent flerovium-287 nuclei. The experiment indicated that contrary to previous experiments, copernicium behaves as a typical member of group 12, demonstrating properties of a volatile metal.

Finally, the team at GSI successfully repeated their physical experiment in January 2007, and detected three atoms of copernicium-283, confirming both the alpha and SF decay modes.

As such, the 5-minute SF activity is still unconfirmed and unidentified. It is possible that it refers to an isomer, namely copernicium-283b, whose yield is dependent upon the exact production methods. It is also possible that it is the result of an electron capture branch in ^{283}Cn leading to ^{283}Rg, which would necessitate a reassignment of its parent to ^{287}Nh (the electron-capture daughter of ^{287}Fl).

^{233}_{92}U + ^{48}_{20}Ca → ^{281−x}_{112}Cn + x n

The team at FLNR studied this reaction in 2004. They were unable to detect any atoms of copernicium and calculated a cross section limit of 0.6 pb. The team concluded that this indicated that the neutron mass number for the compound nucleus has an effect on the yield of evaporation residues.

==== Decay products ====
List of copernicium isotopes observed by decay
Evaporation residue	Observed copernicium isotope
^{288}Lv, ^{284}Fl	^{280}Cn
^{289}Lv, ^{285}Fl	^{281}Cn
^{294}Og, ^{290}Lv, ^{286}Fl	^{282}Cn
^{291}Lv, ^{287}Fl	^{283}Cn
^{292}Lv, ^{288}Fl	^{284}Cn
^{293}Lv, ^{289}Fl	^{285}Cn
^{294}Lv, ^{290}Fl ?	^{286}Cn ?

Copernicium has been observed as decay products of flerovium. Flerovium currently has seven known isotopes, all of which have been shown to undergo alpha decays to become copernicium nuclei, with mass numbers between 280 and 286. Copernicium isotopes with mass numbers 280, 281, 284, 285, and 286 to date have only been produced by flerovium nuclei decay. Parent flerovium nuclei can be themselves decay products of livermorium or oganesson.

For example, in May 2006, the Dubna team (JINR) identified copernicium-282 as a final product in the decay of oganesson via the alpha decay sequence. It was found that the final nucleus undergoes spontaneous fission.

^{294}_{118}Og → ^{290}_{116}Lv + ^{4}_{2}He
^{290}_{116}Lv → ^{286}_{114}Fl + ^{4}_{2}He
^{286}_{114}Fl → ^{282}_{112}Cn + ^{4}_{2}He

In the claimed synthesis of oganesson-293 in 1999, copernicium-281 was identified as decaying by emission of a 10.68 MeV alpha particle with half-life 0.90 ms. The claim was retracted in 2001. This isotope was finally created in 2010 and its decay properties contradicted the previous data.

=== Nuclear isomerism ===
First experiments on the synthesis of ^{283}Cn produced a SF activity with half-life ~5 min. This activity was also observed from the alpha decay of flerovium-287. The decay mode and half-life were also confirmed in a repetition of the first experiment. Later, copernicium-283 was observed to undergo 9.52 MeV alpha decay and SF with a half-life of 3.9 s. It has also been found that alpha decay of copernicium-283 leads to different excited states of darmstadtium-279. These results suggest the assignment of the two activities to two different isomeric levels in copernicium-283, creating copernicium-283a and copernicium-283b. This result may also be due to an electron-capture branching of the parent ^{287}Fl to ^{287}Nh, so that the longer-lived activity would be assigned to ^{283}Rg.

Copernicium-285 has only been observed as a decay product of flerovium-289 and livermorium-293; during the first recorded synthesis of flerovium, one flerovium-289 was created, which alpha decayed to copernicium-285, which itself emitted an alpha particle in 29 seconds, releasing 9.15 or 9.03 MeV. However, in the first experiment to successfully synthesize livermorium, when livermorium-293 was created, it was shown that the created nuclide alpha decayed to flerovium-289, decay data for which differed from the known values significantly. Although unconfirmed, it is highly possible that this is associated with an isomer. The resulting nuclide decayed to copernicium-285, which emitted an alpha particle with a half-life of around 10 minutes, releasing 8.586 MeV. Similar to its parent, it is believed to be a nuclear isomer, copernicium-285b. Due to the low beam energies associated with the initial ^{244}Pu+^{48}Ca experiment, it is possible that the 2n channel may have been reached, producing ^{290}Fl instead of ^{289}Fl; this would then undergo undetected electron capture to ^{290}Nh, thus resulting in a reassignment of this activity to its alpha daughter ^{286}Rg.

Summary of observed alpha decay chains from superheavy elements with Z = 114, 116, 118, or 120 as of 2016. Assignments for dotted nuclides (including the early Dubna chains 5 and 8 containing ^{287}Nh and ^{290}Nh as alternative explanations instead of isomerism in ^{287m}Fl and ^{289m}Fl) are tentative. According to another analysis, chain 3 (starting at element 120) is not a real decay chain, but is rather a random sequence of events.

=== Chemical yields of isotopes ===
==== Cold fusion ====
The table below provides cross-sections and excitation energies for cold fusion reactions producing copernicium isotopes directly. Data in bold represent maxima derived from excitation function measurements. + represents an observed exit channel.

Projectile	Target	CN	1n	2n	3n
^{70}Zn	^{208}Pb	^{278}Cn	0.5 pb, 10.0, 12.0 MeV +		
^{68}Zn	^{208}Pb	^{276}Cn	<1.2 pb, 11.3, 12.8 MeV		

==== Hot fusion ====
The table below provides cross-sections and excitation energies for hot fusion reactions producing copernicium isotopes directly. Data in bold represents maxima derived from excitation function measurements. + represents an observed exit channel.

Projectile	Target	CN	3n	4n	5n
^{48}Ca	^{238}U	^{286}Cn	**2.5 pb, 35.0 MeV** +	0.6 pb	
^{48}Ca	^{233}U	^{281}Cn	<0.6 pb, 34.9 MeV		

=== Fission of compound nuclei with atomic number 112 ===
Several experiments have been performed between 2001 and 2004 at the Flerov Laboratory of Nuclear Reactions in Dubna studying the fission characteristics of the compound nucleus ^{286}Cn. The nuclear reaction used is ^{238}U+^{48}Ca. The results have revealed how nuclei such as this fission predominantly by expelling closed shell nuclei such as ^{132}Sn (Z = 50, N = 82). It was also found that the yield for the fusion-fission pathway was similar between ^{48}Ca and ^{58}Fe projectiles, indicating a possible future use of ^{58}Fe projectiles in superheavy element formation.

=== Theoretical calculations ===
==== Evaporation residue cross sections ====
The below table contains various targets-projectile combinations for which calculations have provided estimates for cross section yields from various neutron evaporation channels. The channel with the highest expected yield is given.

DNS = Di-nuclear system; σ = cross section

Target	Projectile	Cn	Channel (product)	σ_{max}	Model	Ref
^{208}Pb	^{70}Zn	^{278}Cn	1n (^{277}Cn)	1.5 pb	DNS	
^{208}Pb	^{67}Zn	^{275}Cn	1n (^{274}Cn)	2 pb	DNS	
^{238}U	^{48}Ca	^{286}Cn	4n (^{282}Cn)	0.2 pb	DNS	
^{235}U	^{48}Ca	^{283}Cn	3n (^{280}Cn)	50 fb	DNS	
^{238}U	^{44}Ca	^{282}Cn	4–5n (^{278,277}Cn)	23 fb	DNS	
^{244}Pu	^{40}Ar	^{284}Cn	4n (^{280}Cn)	0.1 pb; 9.84 fb	DNS	
^{250}Cm	^{36}S	^{286}Cn	4n (^{282}Cn)	5 pb; 0.24 pb	DNS	
^{248}Cm	^{36}S	^{284}Cn	4n (^{280}Cn)	35 fb	DNS	
^{252}Cf	^{30}Si	^{282}Cn	3n (^{279}Cn)	10 pb	DNS	
