= Hyperdeformation =

Extremely deformed atomic nuclei

In nuclear physics, hyperdeformation is theoretically predicted states of an atomic nucleus with an extremely elongated shape and a very high angular momentum. Less elongated states, superdeformation, have been well observed, but the experimental evidence for hyperdeformation is more limited. Hyperdeformed states correspond to an axis ratio of 3:1. They would be caused by a third minimum in the potential energy surface, the second causing superdeformation and the first minimum being normal deformation. Hyperdeformation is predicted to be found in excited states of ^{107}Cd especially.
