= Magic number (physics) =

Number of protons or neutrons that make a nucleus particularly stable

A graph of isotope stability, with some of the magic numbers

In nuclear physics, a magic number is a number of nucleons (either protons or neutrons, separately) such that they are arranged into complete shells within the atomic nucleus. As a result, atomic nuclei with a "magic" number of protons or neutrons are much more stable than other nuclei. The seven magic numbers are 2, 8, 20, 28, 50, 82, and 126.

For protons, this corresponds to the elements helium, oxygen, calcium, nickel, tin, lead, and the hypothetical unbihexium, although 126 is so far only known to be a magic number for neutrons. Atomic nuclei consisting of such a magic number of nucleons have a higher average binding energy per nucleon than one would expect based upon predictions such as the semi-empirical mass formula and are hence more stable against nuclear decay.

The unusual stability of isotopes having magic numbers means that transuranium elements could theoretically be created with extremely large nuclei and yet not be subject to the extremely rapid radioactive decay normally associated with high atomic numbers. Large isotopes with magic numbers of nucleons are said to exist in an island of stability. Unlike the magic numbers 2–126, which are realized in spherical nuclei, theoretical calculations predict that nuclei in the island of stability are deformed.

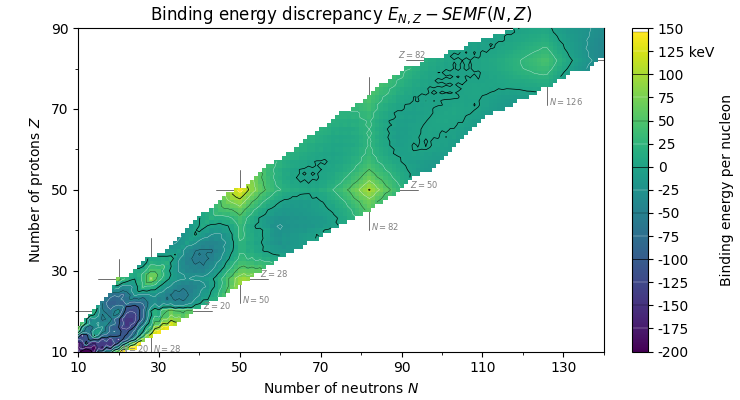
The difference between known binding energies of isotopes and the binding energy as predicted from the semi-empirical mass formula. Distinct sharp peaks in the contours appear only at magic numbers.

Before this was realized, higher magic numbers, such as 184, 258, 350, and 462, were predicted based on simple calculations that assumed spherical shapes: these are generated by the formula $2(\tbinom n1+ \tbinom n2+\tbinom n3)$. It is now believed that the sequence of spherical magic numbers cannot be extended in this way. Further predicted magic numbers are 114, 122, 124, and 164 for protons as well as 184, 196, 236, and 318 for neutrons. However, more modern calculations predict 228 and 308 for neutrons, along with 184 and 196.

== History and etymology ==
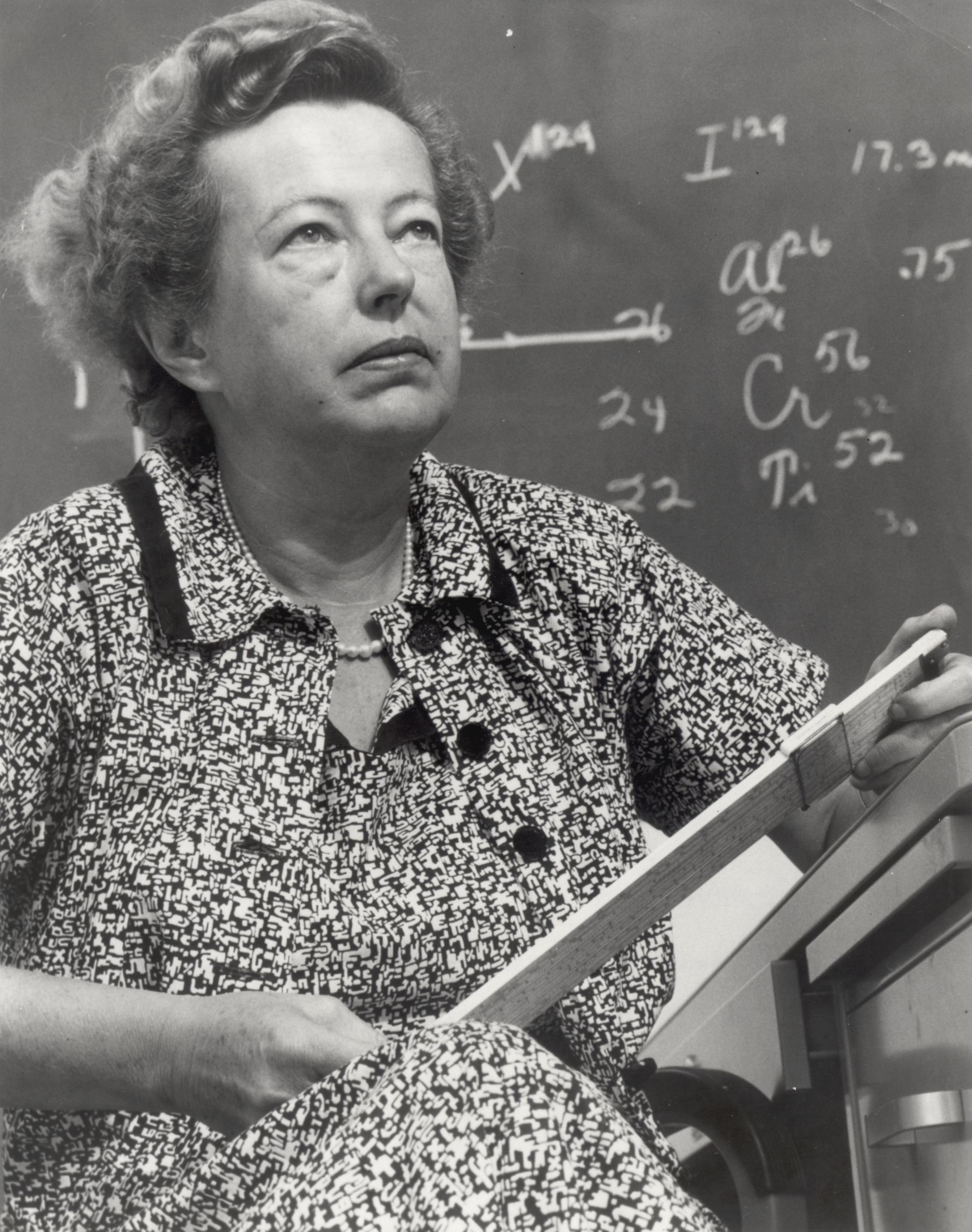
Maria Goeppert Mayer

While working on the Manhattan Project, the German physicist Maria Goeppert Mayer became interested in the properties of nuclear fission products, such as decay energies and half-lives. In 1948, she published a body of experimental evidence for the occurrence of closed nuclear shells for nuclei with 50 or 82 protons or 50, 82, and 126 neutrons.

It had already been known that nuclei with 20 protons or neutrons were stable: that was evidenced by calculations by Hungarian-American physicist Eugene Wigner, one of her colleagues in the Manhattan Project. Two years later, in 1950, a new publication followed in which she attributed the shell closures at the magic numbers to spin-orbit coupling. According to Steven Moszkowski, a student of Goeppert Mayer, the term "magic number" was coined by Wigner: "Wigner too believed in the liquid drop model, but he recognized, from the work of Maria Mayer, the very strong evidence for the closed shells. It seemed a little like magic to him, and that is how the words 'Magic Numbers' were coined."

These magic numbers were the bedrock of the nuclear shell model, which Mayer developed in the following years together with Hans Jensen and culminated in their shared 1963 Nobel Prize in Physics.

== Doubly magic ==
Nuclides with magic numbers of protons and neutrons
-	2	8	20	28	50	82	126
_{2}He	^{4}He	^{10}He	^{22}He	^{30}He	^{52}He	^{84}He	^{128}He
_{8}O	^{10}O	^{16}O	^{28}O	^{36}O	^{58}O	^{90}O	^{134}O
_{20}Ca	^{22}Ca	^{28}Ca	^{40}Ca	^{48}Ca	^{70}Ca	^{102}Ca	^{146}Ca
_{28}Ni	^{30}Ni	^{36}Ni	^{48}Ni	^{56}Ni	^{78}Ni	^{110}Ni	^{154}Ni
_{50}Sn	^{52}Sn	^{58}Sn	^{70}Sn	^{78}Sn	^{100}Sn	^{132}Sn	^{176}Sn
_{82}Pb	^{84}Pb	^{90}Pb	^{102}Pb	^{110}Pb	^{132}Pb	^{164}Pb	^{208}Pb
t^{1/2} Colors	Stable	≥ 1.4×10^{10} yr	≥ 100 yr	≥ 1 d	≥ 1 s	≥ 1 ms	< 1 ms

Nuclei which have neutron numbers and proton (atomic) numbers both equal to one of the magic numbers are called "doubly magic", and are generally very stable against decay. The known doubly magic isotopes are helium-4, helium-10, oxygen-16, oxygen-28, calcium-40, calcium-48, nickel-48, nickel-56, nickel-78, tin-100, tin-132, and lead-208. While only helium-4, oxygen-16, calcium-40, and lead-208 are completely stable, calcium-48 is extremely long-lived and therefore found naturally, disintegrating only by a very inefficient double beta minus decay process. Double beta decay in general is so rare that several nuclides exist which are predicted to decay by this mechanism but in which no such decay has yet been observed. Even in nuclides whose double beta decay has been confirmed through observations, half-lives usually exceed the age of the universe by orders of magnitude, and emitted beta or gamma radiation is for virtually all practical purposes irrelevant. On the other hand, helium-10 is extremely unstable and unbound, and has a half-life of just 260(40) yoctoseconds (2.6(4)×10^{−22} s).

Doubly magic effects may allow the existence of stable isotopes which otherwise would not have been expected. An example is calcium-40, with 20 neutrons and 20 protons, which is the heaviest stable isotope made of the same number of protons and neutrons. Both calcium-48 and nickel-48 are doubly magic because calcium-48 has 20 protons and 28 neutrons while nickel-48 has 28 protons and 20 neutrons. Calcium-48 is very neutron-rich for such a relatively light element, but like calcium-40, it is stabilized by being doubly magic. As an exception, although oxygen-28 has 8 protons and 20 neutrons, it is unbound with respect to four-neutron decay and appears to lack closed neutron shells, so it is not regarded as doubly magic.

Magic number shell effects are seen in ordinary abundances of elements: helium-4 is among the most abundant (and stable) nuclei in the universe and lead-208 is the heaviest stable nuclide (at least by known experimental observations). Alpha decay (the emission of a ^{4}He nucleus – also known as an alpha particle – by a heavy element undergoing radioactive decay) is common in part due to the extraordinary stability of helium-4, which makes this type of decay energetically favored in most heavy nuclei over neutron emission, proton emission or any other type of cluster decay. The stability of ^{4}He also leads to the absence of stable isobars of mass number 5 and 8; indeed, all nuclides of those mass numbers decay within fractions of a second to produce alpha particles.

Magic effects can keep unstable nuclides from decaying as rapidly as would otherwise be expected. For example, the nuclides tin-100 and tin-132 are examples of doubly magic isotopes of tin that are unstable, and represent endpoints beyond which stability drops off rapidly. Nickel-48, discovered in 1999, is the most proton-rich doubly magic nuclide known. At the other extreme, nickel-78 is also doubly magic, with 28 protons and 50 neutrons, a ratio observed only in much heavier elements, apart from tritium with one proton and two neutrons (^{78}Ni: 28/50 = 0.56; ^{238}U: 92/146 = 0.63).

In December 2006, hassium-270, with 108 protons and 162 neutrons, was discovered by an international team of scientists led by the Technical University of Munich, having a half-life of 9 seconds. Hassium-270 evidently forms part of an island of stability, and may even be doubly magic due to the deformed (American football- or rugby ball-like) shape of this nucleus.

Although Z = 92 and N = 164 are not magic numbers, the undiscovered neutron-rich nucleus uranium-256 may be doubly magic and spherical due to the difference in size between low- and high-angular momentum orbitals, which alters the shape of the nuclear potential.

== Derivation ==
Magic numbers are typically obtained by empirical studies; if the form of the nuclear potential is known, then the Schrödinger equation can be solved for the motion of nucleons and energy levels determined. Nuclear shells are said to occur when the separation between energy levels is significantly greater than the local mean separation.

In the shell model for the nucleus, magic numbers are the numbers of nucleons at which a shell is filled. For instance, the magic number 8 occurs when the 1s_{1/2}, 1p_{3/2}, 1p_{1/2} energy levels are filled, as there is a large energy gap between the 1p_{1/2} and the next highest 1d_{5/2} energy levels.

The first few magic numbers can be predicted by simply approximating the nuclear force as a quantum harmonic oscillator in 3 dimensions. The energies are
$$E = \hbar \omega (3/2 + n_x + n_y + n_z)$$
and thus depend only on the sum n = n_{x} + n_{y} + n_{z} of the three quantum numbers n_{x}, n_{y}, n_{z}. The number of states at a level E_{n} are the number of ways to split n into three (nonnegative) numbers n_{x}, n_{y}, n_{z}, one for each dimension. In combinatorics, these are called the weak 3-compositions of n. These can be counted via the stars and bars method, giving
$$\binom{n + 2}{2}$$
states at energy level E_{n}. To account for the two possible spins, we will need to multiply this by 2. This gives us 2, 6, 12, 20 for n = 0, 1, 2, 3. The number of states up to a certain n will give us the number of nucleons needed to fill up to the nth shell, and magic numbers occur when every shell is full, so we need to take the cumulative sum. Thus, we predict that 2, 8 (2 + 6), 20 (2 + 6 + 12), and 40 (2 + 6 + 12 + 20) are magic numbers. This not only misses the magic number 28 (which occurs due to effects like spin-orbit coupling), it predicts 40 is a magic number, which it is not, even though 40 is when the next shell would be filled. The correct formula for predicted magic numbers fundamentally relies on spin-orbit coupling.

The atomic analog to nuclear magic numbers are those numbers of electrons leading to discontinuities in the ionization energy. These occur for the noble gases helium, neon, argon, krypton, xenon, radon and oganesson. Hence, the "atomic magic numbers" are 2, 10, 18, 36, 54, 86, and 118. As with the nuclear magic numbers, these are expected to be changed in the superheavy region due to spin/orbit-coupling effects affecting subshell energy levels. Hence copernicium (112) and flerovium (114) are expected to be more inert than oganesson (118), and the next noble gas after these is expected to occur at element 172 rather than 168 (which would continue the pattern).

In 2010, an alternative explanation of magic numbers was given in terms of symmetry considerations. Based on the fractional extension of the standard rotation group, the ground state properties (including the magic numbers) for metallic clusters and nuclei were simultaneously determined analytically. A specific potential term is not necessary in this model.

== See also ==
- Magic number (chemistry)
- Superatom
- Superdeformation
