= Superdeformation =

Atomic nucleus that is very far from being spherical

In nuclear physics a superdeformed nucleus is a nucleus that is very far from spherical, forming an ellipsoid with axes in ratios of approximately 2:1:1. Normal deformation is approximately 1.3:1:1. Only some nuclei can exist in superdeformed states.

The first superdeformed states to be observed were the fission isomers, low-spin states of elements in the actinide series. The strong force decays much faster than the Coulomb force, which becomes stronger when nucleons are greater than 2.5 femtometers apart. For this reason, these elements undergo spontaneous fission. In the late 1980s, high-spin superdeformed rotational bands were observed in other regions of the periodic table. Specific elements include ruthenium, rhodium, palladium, silver, osmium, iridium, platinum, gold, and mercury.

The existence of superdeformed states occurs because of a combination of macroscopic and microscopic factors, which together lower their energies, and make them stable minima of energy as a function of deformation. Macroscopically, the nucleus can be described by the liquid drop model. The liquid drop's energy as a function of deformation is at a minimum for zero deformation, due to the surface tension term. However, the curve may become soft with respect to high deformations because of the Coulomb repulsion (especially for the fission isomers, which have high Z) and also, in the case of high-spin states, because of the increased moment of inertia. Modulating this macroscopic behavior, the microscopic shell correction creates certain superdeformed magic numbers that are analogous to the spherical magic numbers. For nuclei near these magic numbers, the shell correction creates a second minimum in the energy as a function of deformation.

Even more deformed states (3:1) are called hyperdeformed.

== See also ==
- Semi-empirical mass formula (liquid drop model)
- Transuranium element
