= Unbinilium =

Unbinilium, _{120}Ubn
Theoretical element

Unbinilium
- Pronunciation: /ˌuːnbaɪˈnɪliəm/ (OON-by-NIL-ee-əm)
- Alternative names: element 120, eka-radium

Unbinilium in the periodic table
Hydrogen																															Helium
Lithium	Beryllium																									Boron	Carbon	Nitrogen	Oxygen	Fluorine	Neon
Sodium	Magnesium																									Aluminium	Silicon	Phosphorus	Sulfur	Chlorine	Argon
Potassium	Calcium															Scandium	Titanium	Vanadium	Chromium	Manganese	Iron	Cobalt	Nickel	Copper	Zinc	Gallium	Germanium	Arsenic	Selenium	Bromine	Krypton
Rubidium	Strontium															Yttrium	Zirconium	Niobium	Molybdenum	Technetium	Ruthenium	Rhodium	Palladium	Silver	Cadmium	Indium	Tin	Antimony	Tellurium	Iodine	Xenon
Caesium	Barium	Lanthanum	Cerium	Praseodymium	Neodymium	Promethium	Samarium	Europium	Gadolinium	Terbium	Dysprosium	Holmium	Erbium	Thulium	Ytterbium	Lutetium	Hafnium	Tantalum	Tungsten	Rhenium	Osmium	Iridium	Platinum	Gold	Mercury (element)	Thallium	Lead	Bismuth	Polonium	Astatine	Radon
Francium	Radium	Actinium	Thorium	Protactinium	Uranium	Neptunium	Plutonium	Americium	Curium	Berkelium	Californium	Einsteinium	Fermium	Mendelevium	Nobelium	Lawrencium	Rutherfordium	Dubnium	Seaborgium	Bohrium	Hassium	Meitnerium	Darmstadtium	Roentgenium	Copernicium	Nihonium	Flerovium	Moscovium	Livermorium	Tennessine	Oganesson
Ununennium	Unbinilium	Unquadtrium	Unquadquadium	Unquadpentium	Unquadhexium	Unquadseptium	Unquadoctium	Unquadennium	Unpentnilium	Unpentunium	Unpentbium	Unpenttrium	Unpentquadium	Unpentpentium	Unpenthexium	Unpentseptium	Unpentoctium	Unpentennium	Unhexnilium	Unhexunium	Unhexbium	Unhextrium	Unhexquadium	Unhexpentium	Unhexhexium	Unhexseptium	Unhexoctium	Unhexennium	Unseptnilium	Unseptunium	Unseptbium
		Unbiunium	Unbibium	Unbitrium	Unbiquadium	Unbipentium	Unbihexium	Unbiseptium	Unbioctium	Unbiennium	Untrinilium	Untriunium	Untribium	Untritrium	Untriquadium	Untripentium	Untrihexium	Untriseptium	Untrioctium	Untriennium	Unquadnilium	Unquadunium	Unquadbium
Ra
↑
Ubn
↓
—
ununennium ← unbinilium → unbiunium
- Atomic number (Z): 120
- Group: group 2 (alkaline earth metals)
- Period: period 8 (theoretical, extended table)
- Block: s-block
- Electron configuration: [Og] 8s^{2} (predicted)
- Electrons per shell: 2, 8, 18, 32, 32, 18, 8, 2 (predicted)

Physical properties
- Phase at STP: solid (predicted)
- Melting point: 953 K (680 °C, 1256 °F) (predicted)
- Boiling point: 1973 K (1700 °C, 3092 °F) (predicted)
- Density (near r.t.): 7 g/cm^{3} (predicted)
- Heat of fusion: 8.03–8.58 kJ/mol (extrapolated)

Atomic properties
- Oxidation states: common: (none) (+2), (+4), (+6)
- Electronegativity: Pauling scale: 0.91 (predicted)
- Ionization energies: 1st: 563.3 kJ/mol (predicted); 2nd: 895–919 kJ/mol (extrapolated)
- Atomic radius: empirical: 200 pm (predicted)
- Covalent radius: 206–210 pm (extrapolated)

Other properties
- Crystal structure: body-centered cubic (bcc) (extrapolated)
- CAS Number: 54143-58-7

History
- Naming: IUPAC systematic element name

Isotopes of unbinilium
- Experiments and theoretical calculations

Unbinilium, also known as eka-radium or element 120, is a hypothetical chemical element; it has symbol Ubn and atomic number 120. Unbinilium and Ubn are the temporary systematic IUPAC name and symbol respectively, which are used until the element is discovered, confirmed, and a permanent name is decided upon. In the periodic table of the elements, it is expected to be an s-block element, an alkaline earth metal, and the second element in the eighth period. It has attracted attention because of some predictions that it may be in the island of stability.

Unbinilium has not yet been synthesized, despite multiple attempts from German and Russian teams. Experimental evidence from these attempts shows that the period 8 elements would likely be far more difficult to synthesize than the previous known elements. New attempts by American, Russian, and Chinese teams to synthesize unbinilium are planned to begin in the mid-2020s; in particular, an attempt to synthesize the element was ongoing as of September 2025, at Lawrence Berkeley National Laboratory in the United States.

Unbinilium's position as the seventh alkaline earth metal suggests that it would have similar properties to its lighter congeners; however, relativistic effects may cause some of its properties to differ from those expected from a straight application of periodic trends. For example, unbinilium is expected to be less reactive than barium and radium, be closer in behavior to strontium, and while it should show the characteristic +2 oxidation state of the alkaline earth metals, it is also predicted to show the +4 and +6 oxidation states, which are unknown in any other alkaline earth metal.

== Introduction ==
=== Synthesis of superheavy nuclei ===
A graphic depiction of a nuclear fusion reaction. Two nuclei fuse into one, emitting a neutron. Reactions that created new elements to this moment were similar, though varying numbers of neutrons – or alternatively charged particles – may be emitted instead.

A superheavy (Note: In nuclear physics, an element is called heavy if its atomic number is high; lead (element 82) is one example of such a heavy element. The term "superheavy elements" typically refers to elements with atomic number greater than 103 (although there are other definitions, such as atomic number greater than 100 or 112; sometimes, the term is presented an equivalent to the term "transactinide", which puts an upper limit before the beginning of the hypothetical superactinide series). Terms "heavy isotopes" (of a given element) and "heavy nuclei" mean what could be understood in the common language—isotopes of high mass (for the given element) and nuclei of high mass, respectively.) atomic nucleus is created in a nuclear reaction that combines two other nuclei of unequal size (Note: In 2009, a team at the JINR led by Oganessian published results of their attempt to create hassium in a symmetric ^{136}Xe + ^{136}Xe reaction. They failed to observe a single atom in such a reaction, putting the upper limit on the cross section, the measure of probability of a nuclear reaction, as 2.5 pb. In comparison, the reaction that resulted in hassium discovery, ^{208}Pb + ^{58}Fe, had a cross section of ~20 pb (more specifically, 19^{+19}_{-11} pb), as estimated by the discoverers.) into one; roughly, the more unequal the two nuclei in terms of mass, the greater the possibility that the two react. The material made of the heavier nuclei is made into a target, which is then bombarded by the beam of lighter nuclei. Two nuclei can only fuse into one if they are close enough to each other; normally, nuclei (all positively charged) repel each other due to electrostatic repulsion. The strong interaction can overcome this repulsion but only within a very short distance from a nucleus; beam nuclei are thus greatly accelerated in order to make such repulsion insignificant compared to the velocity of the beam nucleus. The energy applied to the beam nuclei to accelerate them can cause them to reach speeds as high as one-tenth of the speed of light. However, if too much energy is applied, the beam nucleus can fall apart.

Coming close enough alone is not enough for two nuclei to fuse: when two nuclei approach each other, they usually remain together for about 10^{−20} seconds and then part ways (not necessarily in the same composition as before the reaction) rather than form a single nucleus. This happens because during the attempted formation of a single nucleus, electrostatic repulsion tears apart the nucleus that is being formed. Each pair of a target and a beam is characterized by its cross section—the probability that fusion will occur if two nuclei approach one another expressed in terms of the transverse area that the incident particle must hit in order for the fusion to occur. (Note: The amount of energy applied to the beam particle to accelerate it can also influence the value of cross section. For example, in the ^{28}_{14}Si + ^{1}_{0}n → ^{28}_{13}Al + ^{1}_{1}p reaction, cross section changes smoothly from 370 mb at 12.3 MeV to 160 mb at 18.3 MeV, with a broad peak at 13.5 MeV with the maximum value of 380 mb.) This fusion may occur as a result of the quantum effect in which nuclei can tunnel through electrostatic repulsion. If the two nuclei can stay close past that phase, multiple nuclear interactions result in redistribution of energy and an energy equilibrium.

External videos
- Visualization of unsuccessful nuclear fusion, based on calculations from the Australian National University

The resulting merger is an excited state—termed a compound nucleus—and thus it is very unstable. To reach a more stable state, the temporary merger may fission without formation of a more stable nucleus. Alternatively, the compound nucleus may eject a few neutrons, which would carry away the excitation energy; if the latter is not sufficient for a neutron expulsion, the merger would produce a gamma ray. This happens in about 10^{−16} seconds after the initial nuclear collision and results in creation of a more stable nucleus. The definition by the IUPAC/IUPAP Joint Working Party (JWP) states that a chemical element can only be recognized as discovered if a nucleus of it exists for at least 10^{−14} seconds. This value was chosen as an estimate of how long it takes a nucleus to acquire electrons and thus display its chemical properties. (Note: This figure also marks the generally accepted upper limit for lifetime of a compound nucleus.)

=== Decay and detection ===
The beam passes through the target and reaches the next chamber, the separator; if a new nucleus is produced, it is carried with this beam. In the separator, the newly produced nucleus is separated from other nuclides (that of the original beam and any other reaction products) (Note: This separation is based on that the resulting nuclei move past the target more slowly then the unreacted beam nuclei. The separator contains electric and magnetic fields whose effects on a moving particle cancel out for a specific velocity of a particle. Such separation can also be aided by a time-of-flight measurement and a recoil energy measurement; a combination of the two may allow to estimate the mass of a nucleus.) and transferred to a surface-barrier detector, which stops the nucleus. The exact location of the upcoming impact on the detector is marked; also marked are its energy and the time of the arrival. The transfer takes about 10^{−6} seconds; in order to be detected, the nucleus must survive this long. The nucleus is recorded again once its decay is registered, and the location, the energy, and the time of the decay are measured.

Stability of a nucleus is provided by the strong interaction. However, its range is very short; as nuclei become larger, its influence on the outermost nucleons (protons and neutrons) weakens. At the same time, the nucleus is torn apart by electrostatic repulsion between protons, and its range is not limited. Total binding energy provided by the strong interaction increases linearly with the number of nucleons, whereas electrostatic repulsion increases with the square of the atomic number, i.e. the latter grows faster and becomes increasingly important for heavy and superheavy nuclei. Superheavy nuclei are thus theoretically predicted and have so far been observed to predominantly decay via decay modes that are caused by such repulsion: alpha decay and spontaneous fission. (Note: Not all decay modes are caused by electrostatic repulsion. For example, beta decay is caused by the weak interaction.) Almost all alpha emitters have over 210 nucleons, and the lightest nuclide primarily undergoing spontaneous fission has 238. In both decay modes, nuclei are inhibited from decaying by corresponding energy barriers for each mode, but they can be tunneled through.

Scheme of an apparatus for creation of superheavy elements, based on the Dubna Gas-Filled Recoil Separator set up in the Flerov Laboratory of Nuclear Reactions in JINR. The trajectory within the detector and the beam focusing apparatus changes because of a dipole magnet in the former and quadrupole magnets in the latter.

Alpha particles are commonly produced in radioactive decays because the mass of an alpha particle per nucleon is small enough to leave some energy for the alpha particle to be used as kinetic energy to leave the nucleus. Spontaneous fission is caused by electrostatic repulsion tearing the nucleus apart and produces various nuclei in different instances of identical nuclei fissioning. As the atomic number increases, spontaneous fission rapidly becomes more important: spontaneous fission partial half-lives decrease by 23 orders of magnitude from uranium (element 92) to nobelium (element 102), and by 30 orders of magnitude from thorium (element 90) to fermium (element 100). The earlier liquid drop model thus suggested that spontaneous fission would occur nearly instantly due to disappearance of the fission barrier for nuclei with about 280 nucleons. The later nuclear shell model suggested that nuclei with about 300 nucleons would form an island of stability in which nuclei will be more resistant to spontaneous fission and will primarily undergo alpha decay with longer half-lives. Subsequent discoveries suggested that the predicted island might be further than originally anticipated; they also showed that nuclei intermediate between the long-lived actinides and the predicted island are deformed, and gain additional stability from shell effects. Experiments on lighter superheavy nuclei, as well as those closer to the expected island, have shown greater than previously anticipated stability against spontaneous fission, showing the importance of shell effects on nuclei. (Note: It was already known by the 1960s that ground states of nuclei differed in energy and shape as well as that certain magic numbers of nucleons corresponded to greater stability of a nucleus. However, it was assumed that there was no nuclear structure in superheavy nuclei as they were too deformed to form one.)

Alpha decays are registered by the emitted alpha particles, and the decay products are easy to determine before the actual decay; if such a decay or a series of consecutive decays produces a known nucleus, the original product of a reaction can be easily determined. (Note: Since mass of a nucleus is not measured directly but is rather calculated from that of another nucleus, such measurement is called indirect. Direct measurements are also possible, but for the most part they have remained unavailable for superheavy nuclei. The first direct measurement of mass of a superheavy nucleus was reported in 2018 at LBNL. Mass was determined from the location of a nucleus after the transfer (the location helps determine its trajectory, which is linked to the mass-to-charge ratio of the nucleus, since the transfer was done in presence of a magnet).) (That all decays within a decay chain were indeed related to each other is established by the location of these decays, which must be in the same place.) The known nucleus can be recognized by the specific characteristics of decay it undergoes such as decay energy (or more specifically, the kinetic energy of the emitted particle). (Note: If the decay occurred in a vacuum, then since total momentum of an isolated system before and after the decay must be preserved, the daughter nucleus would also receive a small velocity. The ratio of the two velocities, and accordingly the ratio of the kinetic energies, would thus be inverse to the ratio of the two masses. The decay energy equals the sum of the known kinetic energy of the alpha particle and that of the daughter nucleus (an exact fraction of the former). The calculations hold for an experiment as well, but the difference is that the nucleus does not move after the decay because it is tied to the detector.) Spontaneous fission, however, produces various nuclei as products, so the original nuclide cannot be determined from its daughters. (Note: Spontaneous fission was discovered by Soviet physicist Georgy Flerov, a leading scientist at JINR, and thus it was a "hobbyhorse" for the facility. In contrast, the LBL scientists believed fission information was not sufficient for a claim of synthesis of an element. They believed spontaneous fission had not been studied enough to use it for identification of a new element, since there was a difficulty of establishing that a compound nucleus had only ejected neutrons and not charged particles like protons or alpha particles. They thus preferred to link new isotopes to the already known ones by successive alpha decays.)

The information available to physicists aiming to synthesize a superheavy element is thus the information collected at the detectors: location, energy, and time of arrival of a particle to the detector, and those of its decay. The physicists analyze this data and seek to conclude that it was indeed caused by a new element and could not have been caused by a different nuclide than the one claimed. Often, provided data is insufficient for a conclusion that a new element was definitely created and there is no other explanation for the observed effects; errors in interpreting data have been made. (Note: For instance, element 102 was mistakenly identified in 1957 at the Nobel Institute of Physics in Stockholm, Stockholm County, Sweden. There were no earlier definitive claims of creation of this element, and the element was assigned a name by its Swedish, American, and British discoverers, nobelium. It was later shown that the identification was incorrect. The following year, RL was unable to reproduce the Swedish results and announced instead their synthesis of the element; that claim was also disproved later. JINR insisted that they were the first to create the element and suggested a name of their own for the new element, joliotium; the Soviet name was also not accepted (JINR later referred to the naming of the element 102 as "hasty"). This name was proposed to IUPAC in a written response to their ruling on priority of discovery claims of elements, signed 29 September 1992. The name "nobelium" remained unchanged on account of its widespread usage.)

== History ==
Elements 114 to 118 (flerovium through oganesson) were discovered in "hot fusion" reactions bombarding the actinides plutonium through californium with calcium-48, a quasi-stable neutron-rich isotope which could be used as a projectile to produce more neutron-rich isotopes of superheavy elements. This cannot easily be continued to elements 119 and 120, because it would require a target of the next actinides einsteinium and fermium. Tens of milligrams of these would be needed to create such targets, but only micrograms of einsteinium and picograms of fermium have so far been produced. More practical production of further superheavy elements would require bombarding actinides with projectiles heavier than ^{48}Ca, but this is expected to be more difficult. Attempts to synthesize elements 119 and 120 push the limits of current technology, due to the decreasing cross sections of the production reactions and their probably short half-lives, expected to be on the order of microseconds.

=== Synthesis attempts ===
==== Past ====
Following their success in obtaining oganesson by the reaction between ^{249}Cf and ^{48}Ca in 2006, the team at the Joint Institute for Nuclear Research (JINR) in Dubna started experiments in March–April 2007 to attempt to create unbinilium with a ^{58}Fe beam and a ^{244}Pu target. The attempt was unsuccessful, and the Russian team planned to upgrade their facilities before attempting the reaction again.

^{244}_{94}Pu + ^{58}_{26}Fe → ^{302}_{120}Ubn* → no atoms

In April 2007, the team at the GSI Helmholtz Centre for Heavy Ion Research in Darmstadt, Germany attempted to create unbinilium using a ^{238}U target and a ^{64}Ni beam:

^{238}_{92}U + ^{64}_{28}Ni → ^{302}_{120}Ubn* → no atoms

No atoms were detected. The GSI repeated the experiment with higher sensitivity in three separate runs in April–May 2007, January–March 2008, and September–October 2008, all with negative results, reaching a cross section limit of 90 fb.

In 2011, after upgrading their equipment to allow the use of more radioactive targets, scientists at the GSI attempted the rather asymmetrical fusion reaction:

^{248}_{96}Cm + ^{54}_{24}Cr → ^{302}_{120}Ubn* → no atoms

It was expected that the change in reaction would quintuple the probability of synthesizing unbinilium, as the yield of such reactions is strongly dependent on their asymmetry. Although this reaction is less asymmetric than the ^{249}Cf+^{50}Ti reaction, it also creates more neutron-rich unbinilium isotopes that should receive increased stability from their proximity to the shell closure at N = 184. Three signals were observed in May 2011; a possible assignment to ^{299}Ubn and its daughters was considered, but could not be confirmed, and a different analysis suggested that what was observed was simply a random sequence of events.

In August–October 2011, a different team at the GSI using the TASCA facility tried a new, even more asymmetrical reaction:

^{249}_{98}Cf + ^{50}_{22}Ti → ^{299}_{120}Ubn* → no atoms

Because of its asymmetry, the reaction between ^{249}Cf and ^{50}Ti was predicted to be the most favorable practical reaction for synthesizing unbinilium, though it produces a less neutron-rich isotope of unbinilium than any other reaction studied. No unbinilium atoms were identified.

This reaction was investigated again in April to September 2012 at the GSI. This experiment used a ^{249}Bk target and a ^{50}Ti beam to produce element 119, but since ^{249}Bk decays to ^{249}Cf with a half-life of about 327 days, both elements 119 and 120 could be searched for simultaneously:

^{249}_{97}Bk + ^{50}_{22}Ti → ^{299}_{119}Uue* → no atoms
^{249}_{98}Cf + ^{50}_{22}Ti → ^{299}_{120}Ubn* → no atoms

Neither element 119 nor element 120 was observed.

==== Present ====
The team at the Lawrence Berkeley National Laboratory (LBNL) in Berkeley, California, United States had made plans to use the 88-inch cyclotron to make new elements using ^{50}Ti projectiles, in response to theoretical predictions that an attempt to produce element 120 would be feasible. This plan was made even before the Russian invasion of Ukraine began in 2022, cutting off collaborations between the JINR and other institutes. First, the ^{244}Pu+^{50}Ti reaction was tested, successfully creating two atoms of ^{290}Lv in 2024. Since this was successful, an attempt to make element 120 in the ^{249}Cf+^{50}Ti reaction was planned to begin in late 2025. The Lawrence Livermore National Laboratory (LLNL), which previously collaborated with the JINR, is collaborating with the LBNL on this project. By June 2025, updates were underway at the LBNL in preparation for the search for element 120, and by September, the search had begun.

^{249}_{98}Cf + ^{50}_{22}Ti → ^{299}_{120}Ubn* → no atoms yet

==== Planned ====
The JINR's plans to investigate the ^{249}Cf+^{50}Ti reaction in their new facility were disrupted by the 2022 Russian invasion of Ukraine, after which collaboration between the JINR and other institutes completely ceased due to sanctions. Thus, ^{249}Cf could no longer be used as a target, as it would have to be produced at the Oak Ridge National Laboratory (ORNL) in the United States. Instead, the ^{248}Cm+^{54}Cr reaction will be used. In 2023, the director of the JINR, Grigory Trubnikov, stated that he hoped that the experiments to synthesize element 120 will begin in 2025. In preparation for this, the JINR reported success in the ^{238}U+^{54}Cr reaction in late 2023, making a new isotope of livermorium, ^{288}Lv. This was an unexpectedly good result; the aim had been to experimentally determine the cross-section of a reaction with ^{54}Cr projectiles and prepare for the synthesis of element 120. It is the first successful reaction producing a superheavy element using an actinide target and a projectile heavier than ^{48}Ca.

The team at the Heavy Ion Research Facility in Lanzhou, which is operated by the Institute of Modern Physics (IMP) of the Chinese Academy of Sciences, also plans to synthesize elements 119 and 120. The reactions used will involve actinide targets (e.g. ^{243}Am, ^{248}Cm) and first-row transition metal projectiles (e.g. ^{50}Ti, ^{51}V, ^{54}Cr, ^{55}Mn).

=== Naming ===
Mendeleev's nomenclature for unnamed and undiscovered elements would call unbinilium eka-radium. The 1979 IUPAC recommendations temporarily call it unbinilium (symbol Ubn) until it is discovered, the discovery is confirmed and a permanent name chosen. Although the IUPAC systematic names are widely used in the chemical community on all levels, from chemistry classrooms to advanced textbooks, scientists who work theoretically or experimentally on superheavy elements typically call it "element 120", with the symbol E120, (120) or 120.

== Predicted properties ==
=== Nuclear stability and isotopes ===
A chart of nuclide stability as used by the Dubna team in 2010. Characterized isotopes are shown with borders. Beyond element 118 (oganesson, the last known element), the line of known nuclides is expected to rapidly enter a region of instability. The elliptical region encloses the predicted location of the island of stability, centered on element 112, copernicium.

Orbitals with high azimuthal quantum number are raised in energy, eliminating what would otherwise be a gap in orbital energy corresponding to a closed proton shell at element 114, as shown in the left diagram which does not take this effect into account. This raises the next proton shell to the region around element 120, as shown in the right diagram, potentially increasing the half-lives of element 119 and 120 isotopes.

The stability of nuclei decreases greatly with the increase in atomic number after curium, element 96, whose half-life is four orders of magnitude longer than that of any currently known higher-numbered element. All isotopes with an atomic number above 101 undergo radioactive decay with half-lives of less than 30 hours. No elements with atomic numbers above 82 (after lead) have stable isotopes. Nevertheless, because of reasons not yet well understood, there is a slight increase of nuclear stability around atomic numbers 110–114, which leads to the appearance of what is known in nuclear physics as the "island of stability". This concept, proposed by University of California professor Glenn Seaborg, explains why superheavy elements last longer than predicted.

Isotopes of unbinilium are predicted to have alpha decay half-lives of the order of microseconds. In a quantum tunneling model with mass estimates from a macroscopic-microscopic model, the alpha-decay half-lives of several unbinilium isotopes (^{292–304}Ubn) have been predicted to be around 1–20 microseconds. Some heavier isotopes may be more stable; Fricke and Waber predicted ^{320}Ubn to be the most stable unbinilium isotope in 1971. Since unbinilium is expected to decay via a cascade of alpha decays leading to spontaneous fission around copernicium, the total half-lives of unbinilium isotopes are also predicted to be measured in microseconds. This has consequences for the synthesis of unbinilium, as isotopes with half-lives below one microsecond would decay before reaching the detector. Nevertheless, new theoretical models show that the expected gap in energy between the proton orbitals 2f_{7/2} (filled at element 114) and 2f_{5/2} (filled at element 120) is smaller than expected, so that element 114 no longer appears to be a stable spherical closed nuclear shell, and this energy gap may increase the stability of elements 119 and 120. The next doubly magic nucleus is now expected to be around the spherical ^{306}Ubb (element 122), but the expected low half-life and low production cross section of this nuclide makes its synthesis challenging.

Given that element 120 fills the 2f_{5/2} proton orbital, much attention has been given to the compound nucleus ^{302}Ubn* and its properties. Several experiments have been performed between 2000 and 2008 at the Flerov Laboratory of Nuclear Reactions in Dubna studying the fission characteristics of the compound nucleus ^{302}Ubn*. Two nuclear reactions have been used, namely ^{244}Pu+^{58}Fe and ^{238}U+^{64}Ni. The results have revealed how nuclei such as this fission predominantly by expelling closed shell nuclei such as ^{132}Sn (Z = 50, N = 82). It was also found that the yield for the fusion-fission pathway was similar between ^{48}Ca and ^{58}Fe projectiles, suggesting a possible future use of ^{58}Fe projectiles in superheavy element formation.

In 2008, the team at GANIL, France, described the results from a new technique which attempts to measure the fission half-life of a compound nucleus at high excitation energy, since the yields are significantly higher than from neutron evaporation channels. It is also a useful method for probing the effects of shell closures on the survivability of compound nuclei in the super-heavy region, which can indicate the exact position of the next proton shell (Z = 114, 120, 124, or 126). The team studied the nuclear fusion reaction between uranium ions and a target of natural nickel:

^{238}_{92}U + ^{nat}_{28}Ni → ^{296,298,299,300,302}_{120}Ubn* → fission

The results indicated that nuclei of unbinilium were produced at high (≈70 MeV) excitation energy which underwent fission with measurable half-lives just over 10^{−18} s. Although very short (indeed insufficient for the element to be considered by IUPAC to exist, because a compound nucleus has no internal structure and its nucleons have not been arranged into shells until it has survived for 10^{−14} s, when it forms an electronic cloud), the ability to measure such a process indicates a strong shell effect at Z = 120. At lower excitation energy (see neutron evaporation), the effect of the shell will be enhanced and ground-state nuclei can be expected to have relatively long half-lives. This result could partially explain the relatively long half-life of ^{294}Og measured in experiments at Dubna. Similar experiments have indicated a similar phenomenon at element 124 but not for flerovium, suggesting that the next proton shell does in fact lie beyond element 120. In September 2007, the team at RIKEN began a program utilizing ^{248}Cm targets and have indicated future experiments to probe the possibility of 120 being the next proton magic number (and 184 being the next neutron magic number) using the aforementioned nuclear reactions to form ^{302}Ubn*, as well as ^{248}Cm+^{54}Cr. They also planned to further chart the region by investigating the nearby compound nuclei ^{296}Og*, ^{298}Og*, ^{306}Ubb*, and ^{308}Ubb*.

The most likely isotopes of unbinilium to be synthesized in the near future are ^{295}Ubn through ^{299}Ubn, because they can be produced in the 3n and 4n channels of the ^{249–251}Cf+^{50}Ti, ^{245}Cm+^{54}Cr, and ^{248}Cm+^{54}Cr reactions.

=== Atomic and physical ===
Being the second period 8 element, unbinilium is predicted to be an alkaline earth metal, below beryllium, magnesium, calcium, strontium, barium, and radium. Each of these elements has two valence electrons in the outermost s-orbital (valence electron configuration ns^{2}), which is easily lost in chemical reactions to form the +2 oxidation state: thus the alkaline earth metals are rather reactive elements, with the exception of beryllium due to its small size. Unbinilium is predicted to continue the trend and have a valence electron configuration of 8s^{2}. It is therefore expected to behave much like its lighter congeners; however, it is also predicted to differ from the lighter alkaline earth metals in some properties.

The main reason for the predicted differences between unbinilium and the other alkaline earth metals is the spin–orbit (SO) interaction—the mutual interaction between the electrons' motion and spin. The SO interaction is especially strong for the superheavy elements because their electrons move faster—at velocities comparable to the speed of light—than those in lighter atoms. In unbinilium atoms, it lowers the 7p and 8s electron energy levels, stabilizing the corresponding electrons, but two of the 7p electron energy levels are more stabilized than the other four. The effect is called subshell splitting, as it splits the 7p subshell into more-stabilized and the less-stabilized parts. Computational chemists understand the split as a change of the second (azimuthal) quantum number l from 1 to 1/2 and 3/2 for the more-stabilized and less-stabilized parts of the 7p subshell, respectively. (Note: The quantum number corresponds to the letter in the electron orbital name: 0 to s, 1 to p, 2 to d, etc. See azimuthal quantum number for more information.) Thus, the outer 8s electrons of unbinilium are stabilized and become harder to remove than expected, while the 7p_{3/2} electrons are correspondingly destabilized, perhaps allowing them to participate in chemical reactions. This stabilization of the outermost s-orbital (already significant in radium) is the key factor affecting unbinilium's chemistry, and causes all the trends for atomic and molecular properties of alkaline earth metals to reverse direction after barium.

Empirical (Na–Cs, Mg–Ra) and predicted (Fr–Uhp, Ubn–Uhh) atomic radii of the alkali and alkaline earth metals from the third to the ninth period, measured in angstroms

Empirical (Na–Fr, Mg–Ra) and predicted (Uue–Uhp, Ubn–Uhh) ionization energy of the alkali and alkaline earth metals from the third to the ninth period, measured in electron volts

Due to the stabilization of its outer 8s electrons, unbinilium's first ionization energy—the energy required to remove an electron from a neutral atom—is predicted to be 6.0 eV, comparable to that of calcium. The electron of the hydrogen-like unbinilium atom—oxidized so it has only one electron, Ubn^{119+}—is predicted to move so quickly that its mass is 2.05 times that of a non-moving electron, a feature coming from the relativistic effects. For comparison, the figure for hydrogen-like radium is 1.30 and the figure for hydrogen-like barium is 1.095. According to simple extrapolations of relativity laws, that indirectly indicates the contraction of the atomic radius to around 200 pm, very close to that of strontium (215 pm); the ionic radius of the Ubn^{2+} ion is also correspondingly lowered to 160 pm. The trend in electron affinity is also expected to reverse direction similarly at radium and unbinilium.

Unbinilium should be a solid at room temperature, with melting point 680 °C: this continues the downward trend down the group, being lower than the value 700 °C for radium. The boiling point of unbinilium is expected to be around 1700 °C, which is lower than that of all the previous elements in the group (in particular, radium boils at 1737 °C), following the downward periodic trend. The density of unbinilium has been predicted to be 7 g/cm^{3}, continuing the trend of increasing density down the group: the value for radium is 5.5 g/cm^{3}.

=== Chemical ===
Bond lengths and bond-dissociation energies of alkaline earth metal dimers. Data for Ba_{2}, Ra_{2} and Ubn_{2} is predicted.
Compound	Bond length (Å)	Bond-dissociation energy (eV)
Ca_{2}	4.277	0.14
Sr_{2}	4.498	0.13
Ba_{2}	4.831	0.23
Ra_{2}	5.19	0.11
Ubn_{2}	5.65	0.02

The chemistry of unbinilium is predicted to be similar to that of the alkaline earth metals, but it would probably behave more like calcium or strontium than barium or radium. Like strontium, unbinilium should react vigorously with air to form an oxide (UbnO) and with water to form the hydroxide (Ubn(OH)_{2}), which would be a strong base, and releasing hydrogen gas. It should also react with the halogens to form salts such as UbnCl_{2}. While these reactions would be expected from periodic trends, their lowered intensity is somewhat unusual, as ignoring relativistic effects, periodic trends would predict unbinilium to be even more reactive than barium or radium. This lowered reactivity is due to the relativistic stabilization of unbinilium's valence electron, increasing unbinilium's first ionization energy and decreasing the metallic and ionic radii; this effect is already seen for radium. On the other hand, the ionic radius of the Ubn^{2+} ion is predicted to be larger than that of Sr^{2+}, because the 7p orbitals are destabilized and are thus larger than the p-orbitals of the lower shells.

Unbinilium may also show the +4 oxidation state, which is not seen in any other alkaline earth metal, in addition to the +2 oxidation state that is characteristic of the other alkaline earth metals and is also the main oxidation state of all the known alkaline earth metals: this is because of the destabilization and expansion of the 7p_{3/2} spinor, causing its outermost electrons to have a lower ionization energy than what would otherwise be expected. The +6 state involving all the 7p_{3/2} electrons has been suggested in a hexafluoride, UbnF_{6}. The +1 state may also be isolable. Many unbinilium compounds are expected to have a large covalent character, due to the involvement of the 7p_{3/2} electrons in the bonding: this effect is also seen to a lesser extent in radium, which shows some 6s and 6p_{3/2} contribution to the bonding in radium fluoride (RaF_{2}) and astatide (RaAt_{2}), resulting in these compounds having more covalent character. The standard reduction potential of the Ubn^{2+}/Ubn couple is predicted to be −2.9 V, which is almost exactly the same as that for the Sr^{2+}/Sr couple of strontium (−2.899 V).

Bond lengths and bond-dissociation energies of MAu (M = an alkaline earth metal). All data is predicted, except for CaAu.
Compound	Bond length (Å)	Bond-dissociation energy (kJ/mol)
CaAu	2.67	2.55
SrAu	2.808	2.63
BaAu	2.869	3.01
RaAu	2.995	2.56
UbnAu	3.050	1.90

In the gas phase, the alkaline earth metals do not usually form covalently bonded diatomic molecules like the alkali metals do, since such molecules would have the same number of electrons in the bonding and antibonding orbitals and would have very low dissociation energies. Thus, the M–M bonding in these molecules is predominantly through van der Waals forces. The metal–metal bond lengths in these M_{2} molecules increase down the group from Ca_{2} to Ubn_{2}. On the other hand, their metal–metal bond-dissociation energies generally increase from Ca_{2} to Ba_{2} and then drop to Ubn_{2}, which should be the most weakly bound of all the group 2 homodiatomic molecules. The cause of this trend is the increasing participation of the p_{3/2} and d electrons as well as the relativistically contracted s orbital. From these M_{2} dissociation energies, the enthalpy of sublimation (ΔH_{sub}) of unbinilium is predicted to be 150 kJ/mol.

Bond lengths, harmonic frequency, vibrational anharmonicity and bond-dissociation energies of MH and MAu (M = an alkaline earth metal). Data for UbnH and UbnAu are predicted. Data for BaH is taken from experiment, except bond-dissociation energy. Data for BaAu is taken from experiment, except bond-dissociation energy and bond length.
Compound	Bond length (Å)	Harmonic frequency, cm^{−1}	Vibrational anharmonicity, cm^{−1}	Bond-dissociation energy (eV)
UbnH	2.38	1070	20.1	1.00
BaH	2.23	1168	14.5	2.06
UbnAu	3.03	100	0.13	1.80
BaAu	2.91	129	0.18	2.84

The Ubn–Au bond should be the weakest of all bonds between gold and an alkaline earth metal, but should still be stable. This gives extrapolated medium-sized adsorption enthalpies (−ΔH_{ads}) of 172 kJ/mol on gold (the radium value should be 237 kJ/mol) and 50 kJ/mol on silver, the smallest of all the alkaline earth metals, that demonstrate that it would be feasible to study the chromatographic adsorption of unbinilium onto surfaces made of noble metals. The ΔH_{sub} and −ΔH_{ads} values are correlated for the alkaline earth metals.

== See also ==
- Island of stability: flerovium–unbinilium–unbihexium

== Bibliography ==
- Audi, G.; Kondev, F. G.; Wang, M.; et al. (2017). "The NUBASE2016 evaluation of nuclear properties" (PDF). Chinese Physics C. 41 (3) 030001. Bibcode:2017ChPhC..41c0001A. doi:10.1088/1674-1137/41/3/030001.
- Beiser, A. (2003). Concepts of modern physics (6th ed.). McGraw-Hill. ISBN 978-0-07-244848-1. OCLC 48965418.
- Hoffman, D. C.; Ghiorso, A.; Seaborg, G. T. (2000). The Transuranium People: The Inside Story. World Scientific. ISBN 978-1-78-326244-1.
- Kragh, H. (2018). From Transuranic to Superheavy Elements: A Story of Dispute and Creation. Springer. ISBN 978-3-319-75813-8.
- Zagrebaev, V.; Karpov, A.; Greiner, W. (2013). "Future of superheavy element research: Which nuclei could be synthesized within the next few years?" (PDF). Journal of Physics: Conference Series. 420 (1). 012001. arXiv:1207.5700. Bibcode:2013JPhCS.420a2001Z. doi:10.1088/1742-6596/420/1/012001. ISSN 1742-6588. S2CID 55434734. Archived from the original (PDF) on 2015-10-03.
