= Ununennium =

Ununennium, _{119}Uue
Theoretical element

Ununennium
- Pronunciation: /ˌuːn.uːnˈɛniəm/ (OON-oon-EN-ee-əm)
- Alternative names: element 119, eka-francium

Ununennium in the periodic table
Hydrogen																															Helium
Lithium	Beryllium																									Boron	Carbon	Nitrogen	Oxygen	Fluorine	Neon
Sodium	Magnesium																									Aluminium	Silicon	Phosphorus	Sulfur	Chlorine	Argon
Potassium	Calcium															Scandium	Titanium	Vanadium	Chromium	Manganese	Iron	Cobalt	Nickel	Copper	Zinc	Gallium	Germanium	Arsenic	Selenium	Bromine	Krypton
Rubidium	Strontium															Yttrium	Zirconium	Niobium	Molybdenum	Technetium	Ruthenium	Rhodium	Palladium	Silver	Cadmium	Indium	Tin	Antimony	Tellurium	Iodine	Xenon
Caesium	Barium	Lanthanum	Cerium	Praseodymium	Neodymium	Promethium	Samarium	Europium	Gadolinium	Terbium	Dysprosium	Holmium	Erbium	Thulium	Ytterbium	Lutetium	Hafnium	Tantalum	Tungsten	Rhenium	Osmium	Iridium	Platinum	Gold	Mercury (element)	Thallium	Lead	Bismuth	Polonium	Astatine	Radon
Francium	Radium	Actinium	Thorium	Protactinium	Uranium	Neptunium	Plutonium	Americium	Curium	Berkelium	Californium	Einsteinium	Fermium	Mendelevium	Nobelium	Lawrencium	Rutherfordium	Dubnium	Seaborgium	Bohrium	Hassium	Meitnerium	Darmstadtium	Roentgenium	Copernicium	Nihonium	Flerovium	Moscovium	Livermorium	Tennessine	Oganesson
Ununennium	Unbinilium	Unquadtrium	Unquadquadium	Unquadpentium	Unquadhexium	Unquadseptium	Unquadoctium	Unquadennium	Unpentnilium	Unpentunium	Unpentbium	Unpenttrium	Unpentquadium	Unpentpentium	Unpenthexium	Unpentseptium	Unpentoctium	Unpentennium	Unhexnilium	Unhexunium	Unhexbium	Unhextrium	Unhexquadium	Unhexpentium	Unhexhexium	Unhexseptium	Unhexoctium	Unhexennium	Unseptnilium	Unseptunium	Unseptbium
		Unbiunium	Unbibium	Unbitrium	Unbiquadium	Unbipentium	Unbihexium	Unbiseptium	Unbioctium	Unbiennium	Untrinilium	Untriunium	Untribium	Untritrium	Untriquadium	Untripentium	Untrihexium	Untriseptium	Untrioctium	Untriennium	Unquadnilium	Unquadunium	Unquadbium
Fr
↑
Uue
↓
—
oganesson ← ununennium → unbinilium
- Atomic number (Z): 119
- Group: group 1: hydrogen and alkali metals
- Period: period 8 (theoretical, extended table)
- Block: s-block
- Electron configuration: [Og] 8s^{1} (predicted)
- Electrons per shell: 2, 8, 18, 32, 32, 18, 8, 1 (predicted)

Physical properties
- Phase at STP: unknown phase (could be solid or liquid)
- Melting point: 273–303 K (0–30 °C, 32–86 °F) (predicted)
- Boiling point: 903 K (630 °C, 1166 °F) (predicted)
- Density (near r.t.): 3 g/cm^{3} (predicted)
- Heat of fusion: 2.01–2.05 kJ/mol (extrapolated)

Atomic properties
- Oxidation states: common: (none) (+1), (+3), (+5)
- Electronegativity: Pauling scale: 0.86 (predicted)
- Ionization energies: 1st: 463.1 kJ/mol; 2nd: 1698.1 kJ/mol; (predicted)
- Atomic radius: empirical: 240 pm (predicted)
- Covalent radius: 263–281 pm (extrapolated)

Other properties
- Crystal structure: body-centered cubic (bcc) (extrapolated)
- CAS Number: 54846-86-5

History
- Naming: IUPAC systematic element name

Isotopes of ununennium
- Experiments and theoretical calculations

Ununennium, also known as eka-francium or element 119, is a hypothetical chemical element; it has symbol Uue and atomic number 119. Ununennium and Uue are the temporary systematic IUPAC name and symbol respectively, which are used until the element has been discovered, confirmed, and a permanent name is decided upon. In the periodic table of the elements, it is expected to be an s-block element, an alkali metal, and the first element in the eighth period. It is the lightest element that has not yet been synthesized.

Attempts to synthesize the element have been ongoing since 2018 in RIKEN in Japan, and since 2026 at the Joint Institute for Nuclear Research in Dubna, Russia. The Heavy Ion Research Facility in Lanzhou, China (HIRFL) also plans to make an attempt. Theoretical and experimental evidence has shown that the synthesis of ununennium will likely be far more difficult than that of the previous elements.

Ununennium's position as the seventh alkali metal suggests that it would have similar properties to its lighter congeners. However, relativistic effects may cause some of its properties to differ from those expected from a straight application of periodic trends. For example, ununennium is expected to be less reactive than caesium and francium and closer in behavior to potassium or rubidium, and while it should show the characteristic +1 oxidation state of the alkali metals, it is also predicted to show the +3 and +5 oxidation states, which are unknown in any other alkali metal.

== Introduction ==
=== Synthesis of superheavy nuclei ===
A graphic depiction of a nuclear fusion reaction. Two nuclei fuse into one, emitting a neutron. Reactions that created new elements to this moment were similar, though varying numbers of neutrons – or alternatively charged particles – may be emitted instead.

A superheavy (Note: In nuclear physics, an element is called heavy if its atomic number is high; lead (element 82) is one example of such a heavy element. The term "superheavy elements" typically refers to elements with atomic number greater than 103 (although there are other definitions, such as atomic number greater than 100 or 112; sometimes, the term is presented an equivalent to the term "transactinide", which puts an upper limit before the beginning of the hypothetical superactinide series). Terms "heavy isotopes" (of a given element) and "heavy nuclei" mean what could be understood in the common language—isotopes of high mass (for the given element) and nuclei of high mass, respectively.) atomic nucleus is created in a nuclear reaction that combines two other nuclei of unequal size (Note: In 2009, a team at the JINR led by Oganessian published results of their attempt to create hassium in a symmetric ^{136}Xe + ^{136}Xe reaction. They failed to observe a single atom in such a reaction, putting the upper limit on the cross section, the measure of probability of a nuclear reaction, as 2.5 pb. In comparison, the reaction that resulted in hassium discovery, ^{208}Pb + ^{58}Fe, had a cross section of ~20 pb (more specifically, 19^{+19}_{-11} pb), as estimated by the discoverers.) into one; roughly, the more unequal the two nuclei in terms of mass, the greater the possibility that the two react. The material made of the heavier nuclei is made into a target, which is then bombarded by the beam of lighter nuclei. Two nuclei can only fuse into one if they are close enough to each other; normally, nuclei (all positively charged) repel each other due to electrostatic repulsion. The strong interaction can overcome this repulsion but only within a very short distance from a nucleus; beam nuclei are thus greatly accelerated in order to make such repulsion insignificant compared to the velocity of the beam nucleus. The energy applied to the beam nuclei to accelerate them can cause them to reach speeds as high as one-tenth of the speed of light. However, if too much energy is applied, the beam nucleus can fall apart.

Coming close enough alone is not enough for two nuclei to fuse: when two nuclei approach each other, they usually remain together for about 10^{−20} seconds and then part ways (not necessarily in the same composition as before the reaction) rather than form a single nucleus. This happens because during the attempted formation of a single nucleus, electrostatic repulsion tears apart the nucleus that is being formed. Each pair of a target and a beam is characterized by its cross section—the probability that fusion will occur if two nuclei approach one another expressed in terms of the transverse area that the incident particle must hit in order for the fusion to occur. (Note: The amount of energy applied to the beam particle to accelerate it can also influence the value of cross section. For example, in the ^{28}_{14}Si + ^{1}_{0}n → ^{28}_{13}Al + ^{1}_{1}p reaction, cross section changes smoothly from 370 mb at 12.3 MeV to 160 mb at 18.3 MeV, with a broad peak at 13.5 MeV with the maximum value of 380 mb.) This fusion may occur as a result of the quantum effect in which nuclei can tunnel through electrostatic repulsion. If the two nuclei can stay close past that phase, multiple nuclear interactions result in redistribution of energy and an energy equilibrium.

External videos
- Visualization of unsuccessful nuclear fusion, based on calculations from the Australian National University

The resulting merger is an excited state—termed a compound nucleus—and thus it is very unstable. To reach a more stable state, the temporary merger may fission without formation of a more stable nucleus. Alternatively, the compound nucleus may eject a few neutrons, which would carry away the excitation energy; if the latter is not sufficient for a neutron expulsion, the merger would produce a gamma ray. This happens in about 10^{−16} seconds after the initial nuclear collision and results in creation of a more stable nucleus. The definition by the IUPAC/IUPAP Joint Working Party (JWP) states that a chemical element can only be recognized as discovered if a nucleus of it exists for at least 10^{−14} seconds. This value was chosen as an estimate of how long it takes a nucleus to acquire electrons and thus display its chemical properties. (Note: This figure also marks the generally accepted upper limit for lifetime of a compound nucleus.)

=== Decay and detection ===
The beam passes through the target and reaches the next chamber, the separator; if a new nucleus is produced, it is carried with this beam. In the separator, the newly produced nucleus is separated from other nuclides (that of the original beam and any other reaction products) (Note: This separation is based on that the resulting nuclei move past the target more slowly then the unreacted beam nuclei. The separator contains electric and magnetic fields whose effects on a moving particle cancel out for a specific velocity of a particle. Such separation can also be aided by a time-of-flight measurement and a recoil energy measurement; a combination of the two may allow to estimate the mass of a nucleus.) and transferred to a surface-barrier detector, which stops the nucleus. The exact location of the upcoming impact on the detector is marked; also marked are its energy and the time of the arrival. The transfer takes about 10^{−6} seconds; in order to be detected, the nucleus must survive this long. The nucleus is recorded again once its decay is registered, and the location, the energy, and the time of the decay are measured.

Stability of a nucleus is provided by the strong interaction. However, its range is very short; as nuclei become larger, its influence on the outermost nucleons (protons and neutrons) weakens. At the same time, the nucleus is torn apart by electrostatic repulsion between protons, and its range is not limited. Total binding energy provided by the strong interaction increases linearly with the number of nucleons, whereas electrostatic repulsion increases with the square of the atomic number, i.e. the latter grows faster and becomes increasingly important for heavy and superheavy nuclei. Superheavy nuclei are thus theoretically predicted and have so far been observed to predominantly decay via decay modes that are caused by such repulsion: alpha decay and spontaneous fission. (Note: Not all decay modes are caused by electrostatic repulsion. For example, beta decay is caused by the weak interaction.) Almost all alpha emitters have over 210 nucleons, and the lightest nuclide primarily undergoing spontaneous fission has 238. In both decay modes, nuclei are inhibited from decaying by corresponding energy barriers for each mode, but they can be tunneled through.

Scheme of an apparatus for creation of superheavy elements, based on the Dubna Gas-Filled Recoil Separator set up in the Flerov Laboratory of Nuclear Reactions in JINR. The trajectory within the detector and the beam focusing apparatus changes because of a dipole magnet in the former and quadrupole magnets in the latter.

Alpha particles are commonly produced in radioactive decays because the mass of an alpha particle per nucleon is small enough to leave some energy for the alpha particle to be used as kinetic energy to leave the nucleus. Spontaneous fission is caused by electrostatic repulsion tearing the nucleus apart and produces various nuclei in different instances of identical nuclei fissioning. As the atomic number increases, spontaneous fission rapidly becomes more important: spontaneous fission partial half-lives decrease by 23 orders of magnitude from uranium (element 92) to nobelium (element 102), and by 30 orders of magnitude from thorium (element 90) to fermium (element 100). The earlier liquid drop model thus suggested that spontaneous fission would occur nearly instantly due to disappearance of the fission barrier for nuclei with about 280 nucleons. The later nuclear shell model suggested that nuclei with about 300 nucleons would form an island of stability in which nuclei will be more resistant to spontaneous fission and will primarily undergo alpha decay with longer half-lives. Subsequent discoveries suggested that the predicted island might be further than originally anticipated; they also showed that nuclei intermediate between the long-lived actinides and the predicted island are deformed, and gain additional stability from shell effects. Experiments on lighter superheavy nuclei, as well as those closer to the expected island, have shown greater than previously anticipated stability against spontaneous fission, showing the importance of shell effects on nuclei. (Note: It was already known by the 1960s that ground states of nuclei differed in energy and shape as well as that certain magic numbers of nucleons corresponded to greater stability of a nucleus. However, it was assumed that there was no nuclear structure in superheavy nuclei as they were too deformed to form one.)

Alpha decays are registered by the emitted alpha particles, and the decay products are easy to determine before the actual decay; if such a decay or a series of consecutive decays produces a known nucleus, the original product of a reaction can be easily determined. (Note: Since mass of a nucleus is not measured directly but is rather calculated from that of another nucleus, such measurement is called indirect. Direct measurements are also possible, but for the most part they have remained unavailable for superheavy nuclei. The first direct measurement of mass of a superheavy nucleus was reported in 2018 at LBNL. Mass was determined from the location of a nucleus after the transfer (the location helps determine its trajectory, which is linked to the mass-to-charge ratio of the nucleus, since the transfer was done in presence of a magnet).) (That all decays within a decay chain were indeed related to each other is established by the location of these decays, which must be in the same place.) The known nucleus can be recognized by the specific characteristics of decay it undergoes such as decay energy (or more specifically, the kinetic energy of the emitted particle). (Note: If the decay occurred in a vacuum, then since total momentum of an isolated system before and after the decay must be preserved, the daughter nucleus would also receive a small velocity. The ratio of the two velocities, and accordingly the ratio of the kinetic energies, would thus be inverse to the ratio of the two masses. The decay energy equals the sum of the known kinetic energy of the alpha particle and that of the daughter nucleus (an exact fraction of the former). The calculations hold for an experiment as well, but the difference is that the nucleus does not move after the decay because it is tied to the detector.) Spontaneous fission, however, produces various nuclei as products, so the original nuclide cannot be determined from its daughters. (Note: Spontaneous fission was discovered by Soviet physicist Georgy Flerov, a leading scientist at JINR, and thus it was a "hobbyhorse" for the facility. In contrast, the LBL scientists believed fission information was not sufficient for a claim of synthesis of an element. They believed spontaneous fission had not been studied enough to use it for identification of a new element, since there was a difficulty of establishing that a compound nucleus had only ejected neutrons and not charged particles like protons or alpha particles. They thus preferred to link new isotopes to the already known ones by successive alpha decays.)

The information available to physicists aiming to synthesize a superheavy element is thus the information collected at the detectors: location, energy, and time of arrival of a particle to the detector, and those of its decay. The physicists analyze this data and seek to conclude that it was indeed caused by a new element and could not have been caused by a different nuclide than the one claimed. Often, provided data is insufficient for a conclusion that a new element was definitely created and there is no other explanation for the observed effects; errors in interpreting data have been made. (Note: For instance, element 102 was mistakenly identified in 1957 at the Nobel Institute of Physics in Stockholm, Stockholm County, Sweden. There were no earlier definitive claims of creation of this element, and the element was assigned a name by its Swedish, American, and British discoverers, nobelium. It was later shown that the identification was incorrect. The following year, RL was unable to reproduce the Swedish results and announced instead their synthesis of the element; that claim was also disproved later. JINR insisted that they were the first to create the element and suggested a name of their own for the new element, joliotium; the Soviet name was also not accepted (JINR later referred to the naming of the element 102 as "hasty"). This name was proposed to IUPAC in a written response to their ruling on priority of discovery claims of elements, signed 29 September 1992. The name "nobelium" remained unchanged on account of its widespread usage.)

== History ==
=== Synthesis attempts ===
==== Past ====
Elements 114 to 118 (flerovium through oganesson) were discovered in "hot fusion" reactions at the Joint Institute for Nuclear Research (JINR) in Dubna, Russia. This involved bombarding the actinides plutonium through californium with calcium-48, a quasi-stable neutron-rich isotope which could be used as a projectile to produce more neutron-rich isotopes of superheavy elements. (The term "hot" refers to the high excitation energy of the resulting compound nucleus.) This cannot easily be continued to element 119, because it would require a target of the next actinide einsteinium. Tens of milligrams of einsteinium would be needed for a reasonable chance of success, but only micrograms have so far been produced. An attempt to make element 119 from calcium-48 and less than a microgram of einsteinium was made in 1985 at the superHILAC accelerator at Berkeley, California, but did not succeed.

^{254}_{99}Es + ^{48}_{20}Ca → ^{302}_{119}Uue* → no atoms

More practical production of further superheavy elements requires projectiles heavier than ^{48}Ca, but this makes the reaction more symmetric and gives it a smaller chance of success. Attempts to synthesize element 119 push the limits of current technology, due to the decreasing cross sections of the production reactions and the probably short half-lives of produced isotopes, expected to be on the order of microseconds.

From April to September 2012, an attempt to synthesize ^{295}Uue and ^{296}Uue was made by bombarding a target of berkelium-249 with titanium-50 at the GSI Helmholtz Centre for Heavy Ion Research in Darmstadt, Germany. This reaction between ^{249}Bk and ^{50}Ti was predicted to be the most favorable practical reaction for formation of ununennium, as it is the most asymmetric reaction available. Moreover, as berkelium-249 decays to californium-249 (the next element) with a short half-life of 327 days, this allowed elements 119 and 120 to be searched for simultaneously. Due to the predicted short half-lives, the GSI team used new "fast" electronics capable of registering decay events within microseconds.

^{249}_{97}Bk + ^{50}_{22}Ti → ^{299}_{119}Uue* → no atoms
^{249}_{98}Cf + ^{50}_{22}Ti → ^{299}_{120}Ubn* → no atoms

Neither element 119 nor element 120 was observed. This implied a limiting cross-section of 65 femtobarn for producing element 119 in these reactions, and 200 fb for element 120. The experiment was originally planned to continue to November 2012, but was stopped early to make use of the ^{249}Bk target to confirm the synthesis of tennessine (thus changing the projectile to ^{48}Ca).

==== Present ====
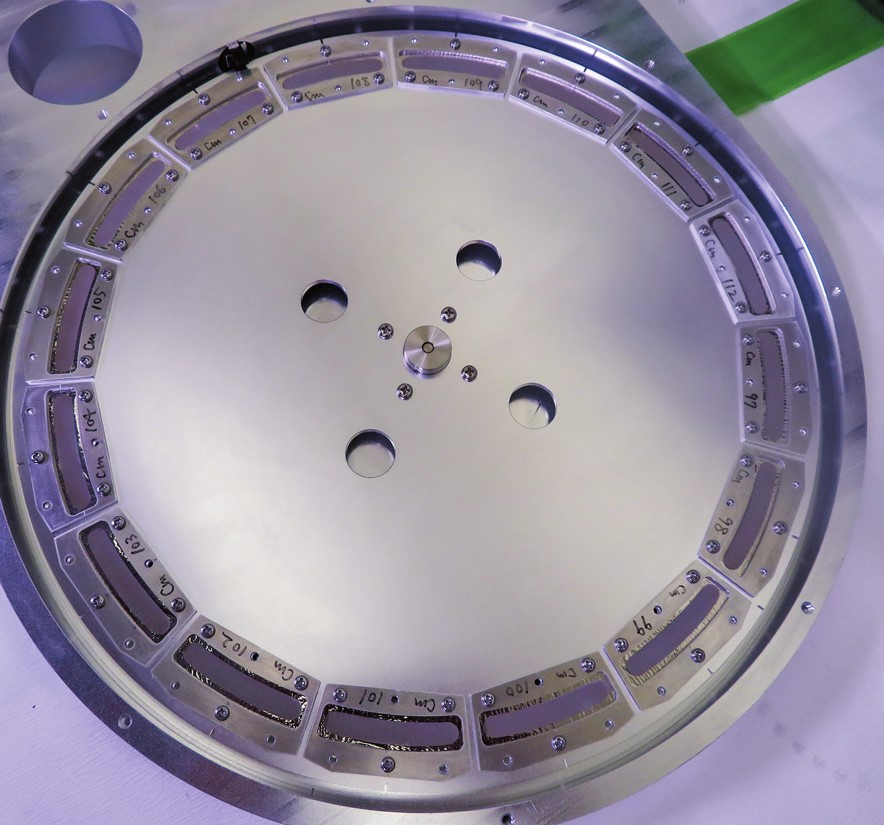
The curium oxide targets used by RIKEN for the search for element 119

The team at RIKEN in Wakō, Japan began bombarding curium-248 targets with a vanadium-51 beam in January 2018 to search for element 119. Curium was chosen as a target, rather than heavier berkelium or californium, as these heavier targets are difficult to prepare. The ^{248}Cm targets were provided by Oak Ridge National Laboratory. RIKEN developed a high-intensity vanadium beam. The experiment began at a cyclotron while RIKEN upgraded its linear accelerators; the upgrade was completed in 2020. Bombardment may be continued with both machines until the first event is observed. The RIKEN team's efforts are being financed by the Emperor of Japan.

^{248}_{96}Cm + ^{51}_{23}V → ^{299}_{119}Uue* → no atoms yet

The produced isotopes of ununennium are expected to undergo two alpha decays to known isotopes of moscovium, ^{287}Mc and ^{288}Mc. This would anchor them to a known sequence of five or six further alpha decays, respectively, and corroborate their production.

As of September 2023, the team at RIKEN had run the ^{248}Cm+^{51}V reaction for 462 days. A report by the RIKEN Nishina Center Advisory Committee noted that this reaction was chosen because of the availability of the target and projectile materials, despite predictions favoring the ^{249}Bk+^{50}Ti reaction, because the ^{50}Ti projectile is closer to doubly magic ^{48}Ca and has an even atomic number (22); reactions with even-Z projectiles have generally been shown to have greater cross-sections. (With that said, ^{249}Bk has the disadvantage of a short half-life.) The report recommended that if the 5 fb cross-section limit is reached without any events observed, then the team should "evaluate and eventually reconsider the experimental strategy before taking additional beam time." As of August 2024, the team at RIKEN was still running this reaction "24/7".

The team at the JINR is also currently attempting the synthesis of element 119. In late 2023, the JINR reported the first successful synthesis of a superheavy element with a projectile heavier than ^{48}Ca: ^{238}U was bombarded with ^{54}Cr to make a new isotope of livermorium (element 116), ^{288}Lv. Successful synthesis of a superheavy nuclide in this experiment was an unexpectedly good result; the aim was to experimentally determine the cross-section of a reaction with ^{54}Cr projectiles and prepare for the synthesis of element 120. In February 2026, Yuri Oganessian at the JINR stated that an experiment to synthesize element 119 would begin in May of that year. This experiment uses a ^{249}Bk target and a ^{50}Ti beam: initial results are expected to be announced in September to October 2026. As of June 2026, the obtained sensitivity of the experiment is 480 fb; according to Vladimir Utyonkov, a sensitivity of 180–200 fb would be needed to observe one event.

^{249}_{97}Bk + ^{50}_{22}Ti → ^{299}_{119}Uue* → no atoms yet

As of September 2026, the experiment is continuing.

As of October 2026, data collection is underway, with the achieved sensitivity being larger than previously envisaged.

==== Planned ====
As of 2024, the team at the Heavy Ion Research Facility in Lanzhou (HIRFL), which is operated by the Institute of Modern Physics (IMP) of the Chinese Academy of Sciences, plans to try the ^{243}Am+^{54}Cr reaction.

=== Naming ===
Using Mendeleev's nomenclature for unnamed and undiscovered elements, ununennium should be known as eka-francium. Using the 1979 IUPAC recommendations, the element should be temporarily called ununennium (symbol Uue) until it is discovered, the discovery is confirmed, and a permanent name chosen. Although widely used in the chemical community on all levels, from chemistry classrooms to advanced textbooks, the recommendations are mostly ignored among scientists who work theoretically or experimentally on superheavy elements, who call it "element 119", with the symbol E119, (119) or 119.

== Predicted properties ==
=== Nuclear stability and isotopes ===
A chart of nuclide stability as used by the Dubna team in 2010. Characterized isotopes are shown with borders. Beyond element 118 (oganesson, the last known element), the line of known nuclides is expected to rapidly enter a region of instability. The white ring encloses the predicted location of the island of stability.

Orbitals with high azimuthal quantum number are raised in energy, eliminating what would otherwise be a gap in orbital energy corresponding to a closed proton shell at element 114, as shown in the left diagram which does not take this effect into account. This raises the next proton shell to the region around element 120, as shown in the right diagram, potentially increasing the half-lives of element 119 and 120 isotopes.

The stability of nuclei decreases greatly with the increase in atomic number after curium, element 96, whose half-life is four orders of magnitude longer than that of any currently known higher-numbered element. All isotopes with an atomic number above 101 undergo radioactive decay with half-lives of less than 30 hours. No elements with atomic numbers above 82 (after lead) have stable isotopes. Nevertheless, for reasons not yet well understood, there is a slight increase of nuclear stability around atomic numbers 110–114, which leads to the appearance of what is known in nuclear physics as the "island of stability". This concept, proposed by University of California professor Glenn Seaborg, explains why superheavy elements last longer than predicted.

The alpha-decay half-lives predicted for ^{291–307}Uue are on the order of microseconds. The longest alpha-decay half-life predicted is ~485 microseconds for the isotope ^{294}Uue. When factoring in all decay modes, the predicted half-lives drop further to only tens of microseconds. Some heavier isotopes may be more stable; Fricke and Waber predicted ^{315}Uue to be the most stable ununennium isotope in 1971. This has consequences for the synthesis of ununennium, as isotopes with half-lives below one microsecond would decay before reaching the detector, and the heavier isotopes cannot be synthesized by the collision of any known usable target and projectile nuclei. Nevertheless, new theoretical models show that the expected gap in energy between the proton orbitals 2f_{7/2} (filled at element 114) and 2f_{5/2} (filled at element 120) is smaller than expected, so that element 114 no longer appears to be a stable spherical closed nuclear shell, and this energy gap may increase the stability of elements 119 and 120. The next doubly magic nucleus is now expected to be around the spherical ^{306}Ubb (element 122), but the expected low half-life and low production cross section of this nuclide makes its synthesis challenging.

The most likely isotopes of ununennium to be synthesized in the near future are ^{293}Uue through ^{296}Uue, because they are populated in the 3n and 4n channels of the ^{243}Am+^{54}Cr and ^{249}Bk+^{50}Ti reactions.

=== Atomic and physical ===
Being the first period 8 element, ununennium is predicted to be an alkali metal, taking its place in the periodic table below lithium, sodium, potassium, rubidium, caesium, and francium. Each of these elements has one valence electron in the outermost s-orbital (valence electron configuration ns^{1}), which is easily lost in chemical reactions to form the +1 oxidation state: thus, the alkali metals are very reactive elements. Ununennium is predicted to continue the trend and have a valence electron configuration of 8s^{1}. It is therefore expected to behave much like its lighter congeners; however, it is also predicted to differ from the lighter alkali metals in some properties.

The main reason for the predicted differences between ununennium and the other alkali metals is the spin–orbit (SO) interaction—the mutual interaction between the electrons' motion and spin. The SO interaction is especially strong for the superheavy elements because their electrons move faster—at speeds comparable to the speed of light—than those in lighter atoms. In ununennium atoms, it lowers the 7p and 8s electron energy levels, stabilizing the corresponding electrons, but two of the 7p electron energy levels are more stabilized than the other four. The effect is called subshell splitting, as it splits the 7p subshell into more-stabilized and the less-stabilized parts. Computational chemists understand the split as a change of the second (azimuthal) quantum number ℓ from 1 to 1/2 and 3/2 for the more-stabilized and less-stabilized parts of the 7p subshell, respectively. (Note: The quantum number corresponds to the letter in the electron orbital name: 0 to s, 1 to p, 2 to d, etc. See azimuthal quantum number for more information.) Thus, the outer 8s electron of ununennium is stabilized and becomes harder to remove than expected, while the 7p_{3/2} electrons are correspondingly destabilized, perhaps allowing them to participate in chemical reactions. This stabilization of the outermost s-orbital (already significant in francium) is the key factor affecting ununennium's chemistry, and causes all the trends for atomic and molecular properties of alkali metals to reverse direction after caesium.

Empirical (Na–Cs, Mg–Ra) and predicted (Fr–Uhp, Ubn–Uhh) atomic radii of the alkali and alkaline earth metals from the third to the ninth period, measured in angstroms

Empirical (Na–Cs), semi-empirical (Fr), and predicted (Uue) electron affinities of the alkali metals from the third to the eighth period, measured in electron volts. They decrease from Li to Cs, but the Fr value, 492±10 meV, is 20 meV higher than that of Cs, and that of Uue is much higher still at 662 meV.

Empirical (Na–Fr, Mg–Ra) and predicted (Uue–Uhp, Ubn–Uhh) ionization energy of the alkali and alkaline earth metals from the third to the ninth period, measured in electron volts

Due to the stabilization of its outer 8s electron, ununennium's first ionization energy—the energy required to remove an electron from a neutral atom—is predicted to be 4.53 eV, higher than those of the known alkali metals from potassium onward. This effect is so large that unbiunium (element 121) is predicted to have a lower ionization energy of 4.45 eV, so that the alkali metal in period 8 would not have the lowest ionization energy in the period, as is true for all previous periods. Ununennium's electron affinity is expected to be far greater than that of caesium and francium; indeed, ununennium is expected to have an electron affinity higher than all the alkali metals lighter than it at about 0.662 eV, close to that of cobalt (0.662 eV) and chromium (0.676 eV). Relativistic effects also cause a very large drop in the polarizability of ununennium to 169.7 a.u. Indeed, the static dipole polarisability (α_{D}) of ununennium, a quantity for which the impacts of relativity are proportional to the square of the element's atomic number, has been calculated to be small and similar to that of sodium.

The electron of the hydrogen-like ununennium atom—oxidized so it has only one electron, Uue^{118+}—is predicted to move so quickly that its mass is 1.99 times that of a non-moving electron, a consequence of relativistic effects. For comparison, the figure for hydrogen-like francium is 1.29 and the figure for hydrogen-like caesium is 1.091. According to simple extrapolations of relativity laws, that indirectly indicates the contraction of the atomic radius to around 240 pm, very close to that of rubidium (247 pm); the metallic radius is also correspondingly lowered to 260 pm. The ionic radius of Uue^{+} is expected to be 180 pm.

Ununennium is predicted to have a melting point between 0 °C and 30 °C: thus it may be a liquid at room temperature. It is not known whether this continues the trend of decreasing melting points down the group, as caesium's melting point is 28.5 °C and francium's is estimated to be around 8.0 °C. The boiling point of ununennium is expected to be around 630 °C, similar to that of francium, estimated to be around 620 °C; this is lower than caesium's boiling point of 671 °C. The density of ununennium has been variously predicted to be between 3 and 4 g/cm^{3}, continuing the trend of increasing density down the group: the density of francium is estimated at 2.48 g/cm^{3}, and that of caesium is known to be 1.93 g/cm^{3}.

=== Chemical ===
Bond lengths and bond-dissociation energies of alkali metal dimers. Data for Fr_{2} and Uue_{2} are predicted.
Dimer	Bond length (Å)	Bond-dissociation energy (kJ/mol)
Li_{2}	2.673	101.9
Na_{2}	3.079	72.04
K_{2}	3.924	53.25
Rb_{2}	4.210	47.77
Cs_{2}	4.648	43.66
Fr_{2}	~ 4.61	~ 42.1
Uue_{2}	~ 4.27	~ 53.4

The chemistry of ununennium is predicted to be similar to that of the alkali metals, but it would probably behave more like potassium or rubidium than caesium or francium. This is due to relativistic effects, as in their absence periodic trends would predict ununennium to be even more reactive than caesium and francium. This lowered reactivity is due to the relativistic stabilization of ununennium's valence electron, increasing ununennium's first ionization energy and decreasing the metallic and ionic radii; this effect is already seen for francium.

The chemistry of ununennium in the +1-oxidation state should be more similar to the chemistry of rubidium than to that of francium. On the other hand, the ionic radius of the Uue^{+} ion is predicted to be larger than that of Rb^{+}, because the 7p orbitals are destabilized and are thus larger than the p-orbitals of the lower shells. Ununennium may also show the +3 oxidation state, which is not seen in any other alkali metal, in addition to the +1 oxidation state that is characteristic of the other alkali metals and is also the main oxidation state of all the known alkali metals: this is because of the destabilization and expansion of the 7p_{3/2} spinor, causing its outermost electrons to have a lower ionization energy than what would otherwise be expected. The 7p_{3/2} spinor's chemical activity has been suggested to make the +5 oxidation state possible in [UueF_{6}]^{−}, analogous to [SbF_{6}]^{−} or [BrF_{6}]^{−}. The analogous francium(V) compound, [FrF_{6}]^{−}, might also be achievable, but is not experimentally known.

Many ununennium compounds are expected to have a large covalent character, due to the involvement of the 7p_{3/2} electrons in the bonding: this effect is also seen to a lesser extent in francium, which shows some 6p_{3/2} contribution to the bonding in francium superoxide (FrO_{2}). Thus, instead of ununennium being the most electropositive element, as a simple extrapolation would seem to indicate, caesium retains this position, with ununennium's electronegativity most likely being close to sodium's (0.93 on the Pauling scale). The standard reduction potential of the Uue^{+}/Uue couple is predicted to be −2.9 V, the same as that of the Fr^{+}/Fr couple and just over that of the K^{+}/K couple at −2.931 V.

Bond lengths and bond-dissociation energies of MAu (M = an alkali metal). All data are predicted, except for the bond-dissociation energies of KAu, RbAu, and CsAu.
Compound	Bond length (Å)	Bond-dissociation energy (kJ/mol)
KAu	2.856	2.75
RbAu	2.967	2.48
CsAu	3.050	2.53
FrAu	3.097	2.75
UueAu	3.074	2.44

In the gas phase, and at very low temperatures in the condensed phase, the alkali metals form covalently bonded diatomic molecules. The metal–metal bond lengths in these M_{2} molecules increase down the group from Li_{2} to Cs_{2}, but then decrease after that to Uue_{2}, due to the aforementioned relativistic effects that stabilize the 8s orbital. The opposite trend is shown for the metal–metal bond-dissociation energies. The Uue–Uue bond should be slightly stronger than the K–K bond. From these M_{2} dissociation energies, the enthalpy of sublimation (ΔH_{sub}) of ununennium is predicted to be 94 kJ/mol (the value for francium should be around 77 kJ/mol).

The UueF molecule is expected to have a significant covalent character owing to the high electron affinity of ununennium. The bonding in UueF is predominantly between a 7p orbital on ununennium and a 2p orbital on fluorine, with lesser contributions from the 2s orbital of fluorine and the 8s, 6d_{z^{2}}, and the two other 7p orbitals of ununennium. This is very different from the behaviour of s-block elements, as well as gold and mercury, in which the s-orbitals (sometimes mixed with d-orbitals) are the ones participating in the bonding. The Uue–F bond is relativistically expanded due to the splitting of the 7p orbital into 7p_{1/2} and 7p_{3/2} spinors, forcing the bonding electrons into the largest orbital measured by radial extent: a similar expansion in bond length is found in the hydrides AtH and TsH. The Uue–Au bond should be the weakest of all bonds between gold and an alkali metal, but should still be stable. This gives extrapolated medium-sized adsorption enthalpies (−ΔH_{ads}) of 106 kJ/mol on gold (the francium value should be 136 kJ/mol), 76 kJ/mol on platinum, and 63 kJ/mol on silver, the smallest of all the alkali metals, that demonstrate that it would be feasible to study the chromatographic adsorption of ununennium onto surfaces made of noble metals. The enthalpy of adsorption of ununennium on a Teflon surface is predicted to be 17.6 kJ/mol, which would be the lowest among the alkali metals. The ΔH_{sub} and −ΔH_{ads} values for the alkali metals change in opposite directions as atomic number increases.

== See also ==
- Extended periodic table

== Bibliography ==
- Audi, G.; Kondev, F. G.; Wang, M.; et al. (2017). "The NUBASE2016 evaluation of nuclear properties" (PDF). Chinese Physics C. 41 (3) 030001. Bibcode:2017ChPhC..41c0001A. doi:10.1088/1674-1137/41/3/030001.
- Beiser, A. (2003). Concepts of modern physics (6th ed.). McGraw-Hill. ISBN 978-0-07-244848-1. OCLC 48965418.
- Hoffman, D. C.; Ghiorso, A.; Seaborg, G. T. (2000). The Transuranium People: The Inside Story. World Scientific. ISBN 978-1-78-326244-1.
- Kragh, H. (2018). From Transuranic to Superheavy Elements: A Story of Dispute and Creation. Springer. ISBN 978-3-319-75813-8.
- Zagrebaev, V.; Karpov, A.; Greiner, W. (2013). "Future of superheavy element research: Which nuclei could be synthesized within the next few years?". Journal of Physics: Conference Series. 420 (1). 012001. arXiv:1207.5700. Bibcode:2013JPhCS.420a2001Z. doi:10.1088/1742-6596/420/1/012001. ISSN 1742-6588. S2CID 55434734.
