= Unbihexium =

Unbihexium, _{126}Ubh
Theoretical element

Unbihexium
- Pronunciation: /ˌuːnbaɪˈhɛksiəm/ (OON-by-HEK-see-əm)
- Alternative names: element 126, eka-plutonium

Unbihexium in the periodic table
Hydrogen																															Helium
Lithium	Beryllium																									Boron	Carbon	Nitrogen	Oxygen	Fluorine	Neon
Sodium	Magnesium																									Aluminium	Silicon	Phosphorus	Sulfur	Chlorine	Argon
Potassium	Calcium															Scandium	Titanium	Vanadium	Chromium	Manganese	Iron	Cobalt	Nickel	Copper	Zinc	Gallium	Germanium	Arsenic	Selenium	Bromine	Krypton
Rubidium	Strontium															Yttrium	Zirconium	Niobium	Molybdenum	Technetium	Ruthenium	Rhodium	Palladium	Silver	Cadmium	Indium	Tin	Antimony	Tellurium	Iodine	Xenon
Caesium	Barium	Lanthanum	Cerium	Praseodymium	Neodymium	Promethium	Samarium	Europium	Gadolinium	Terbium	Dysprosium	Holmium	Erbium	Thulium	Ytterbium	Lutetium	Hafnium	Tantalum	Tungsten	Rhenium	Osmium	Iridium	Platinum	Gold	Mercury (element)	Thallium	Lead	Bismuth	Polonium	Astatine	Radon
Francium	Radium	Actinium	Thorium	Protactinium	Uranium	Neptunium	Plutonium	Americium	Curium	Berkelium	Californium	Einsteinium	Fermium	Mendelevium	Nobelium	Lawrencium	Rutherfordium	Dubnium	Seaborgium	Bohrium	Hassium	Meitnerium	Darmstadtium	Roentgenium	Copernicium	Nihonium	Flerovium	Moscovium	Livermorium	Tennessine	Oganesson
Ununennium	Unbinilium	Unquadtrium	Unquadquadium	Unquadpentium	Unquadhexium	Unquadseptium	Unquadoctium	Unquadennium	Unpentnilium	Unpentunium	Unpentbium	Unpenttrium	Unpentquadium	Unpentpentium	Unpenthexium	Unpentseptium	Unpentoctium	Unpentennium	Unhexnilium	Unhexunium	Unhexbium	Unhextrium	Unhexquadium	Unhexpentium	Unhexhexium	Unhexseptium	Unhexoctium	Unhexennium	Unseptnilium	Unseptunium	Unseptbium
		Unbiunium	Unbibium	Unbitrium	Unbiquadium	Unbipentium	Unbihexium	Unbiseptium	Unbioctium	Unbiennium	Untrinilium	Untriunium	Untribium	Untritrium	Untriquadium	Untripentium	Untrihexium	Untriseptium	Untrioctium	Untriennium	Unquadnilium	Unquadunium	Unquadbium
—
↑
Ubh
↓
—
unbipentium ← unbihexium → unbiseptium
- Atomic number (Z): 126
- Group: g-block groups (no number)
- Period: period 8 (theoretical, extended table)
- Block: g-block
- Electron configuration: predictions vary, see text

Physical properties
- Phase at STP: unknown

Atomic properties
- Oxidation states: common: (none) (+4), (+6), (+8)

Other properties
- CAS Number: 54500-77-5

History
- Naming: IUPAC systematic element name

Unbihexium, also known as element 126 or eka-plutonium, is a hypothetical chemical element; it has atomic number 126 and placeholder symbol Ubh. Unbihexium and Ubh are the temporary IUPAC name and symbol, respectively, until the element is discovered, confirmed, and a permanent name is decided upon. In the periodic table, unbihexium is expected to be a g-block superactinide and the eighth element in the 8th period. Unbihexium has attracted attention among nuclear physicists, especially in early predictions targeting properties of superheavy elements, for 126 may be a magic number of protons near the center of an island of stability, leading to longer half-lives, especially for ^{310}Ubh or ^{354}Ubh which may also have magic numbers of neutrons.

Early interest in possible increased stability led to the first attempted synthesis of unbihexium in 1971 and searches for it in nature in subsequent years. Despite several reported observations, more recent studies suggest that these experiments were insufficiently sensitive; hence, no unbihexium has been found naturally or artificially. Predictions of the stability of unbihexium vary greatly among different models; some suggest the island of stability may instead lie at a lower atomic number, closer to copernicium and flerovium.

Unbihexium is predicted to be a chemically active superactinide, exhibiting a variety of oxidation states from +1 to +8, and possibly being a heavier congener of plutonium. An overlap in energy levels of the 5g, 6f, 7d, and 8p orbitals is also expected, which complicates predictions of chemical properties for this element.

== Introduction ==
=== Synthesis of superheavy nuclei ===
A graphic depiction of a nuclear fusion reaction. Two nuclei fuse into one, emitting a neutron. Reactions that created new elements to this moment were similar, though varying numbers of neutrons – or alternatively charged particles – may be emitted instead.

A superheavy (Note: In nuclear physics, an element is called heavy if its atomic number is high; lead (element 82) is one example of such a heavy element. The term "superheavy elements" typically refers to elements with atomic number greater than 103 (although there are other definitions, such as atomic number greater than 100 or 112; sometimes, the term is presented an equivalent to the term "transactinide", which puts an upper limit before the beginning of the hypothetical superactinide series). Terms "heavy isotopes" (of a given element) and "heavy nuclei" mean what could be understood in the common language—isotopes of high mass (for the given element) and nuclei of high mass, respectively.) atomic nucleus is created in a nuclear reaction that combines two other nuclei of unequal size (Note: In 2009, a team at the JINR led by Oganessian published results of their attempt to create hassium in a symmetric ^{136}Xe + ^{136}Xe reaction. They failed to observe a single atom in such a reaction, putting the upper limit on the cross section, the measure of probability of a nuclear reaction, as 2.5 pb. In comparison, the reaction that resulted in hassium discovery, ^{208}Pb + ^{58}Fe, had a cross section of ~20 pb (more specifically, 19^{+19}_{-11} pb), as estimated by the discoverers.) into one; roughly, the more unequal the two nuclei in terms of mass, the greater the possibility that the two react. The material made of the heavier nuclei is made into a target, which is then bombarded by the beam of lighter nuclei. Two nuclei can only fuse into one if they are close enough to each other; normally, nuclei (all positively charged) repel each other due to electrostatic repulsion. The strong interaction can overcome this repulsion but only within a very short distance from a nucleus; beam nuclei are thus greatly accelerated in order to make such repulsion insignificant compared to the velocity of the beam nucleus. The energy applied to the beam nuclei to accelerate them can cause them to reach speeds as high as one-tenth of the speed of light. However, if too much energy is applied, the beam nucleus can fall apart.

Coming close enough alone is not enough for two nuclei to fuse: when two nuclei approach each other, they usually remain together for about 10^{−20} seconds and then part ways (not necessarily in the same composition as before the reaction) rather than form a single nucleus. This happens because during the attempted formation of a single nucleus, electrostatic repulsion tears apart the nucleus that is being formed. Each pair of a target and a beam is characterized by its cross section—the probability that fusion will occur if two nuclei approach one another expressed in terms of the transverse area that the incident particle must hit in order for the fusion to occur. (Note: The amount of energy applied to the beam particle to accelerate it can also influence the value of cross section. For example, in the ^{28}_{14}Si + ^{1}_{0}n → ^{28}_{13}Al + ^{1}_{1}p reaction, cross section changes smoothly from 370 mb at 12.3 MeV to 160 mb at 18.3 MeV, with a broad peak at 13.5 MeV with the maximum value of 380 mb.) This fusion may occur as a result of the quantum effect in which nuclei can tunnel through electrostatic repulsion. If the two nuclei can stay close past that phase, multiple nuclear interactions result in redistribution of energy and an energy equilibrium.

External videos
- Visualization of unsuccessful nuclear fusion, based on calculations from the Australian National University

The resulting merger is an excited state—termed a compound nucleus—and thus it is very unstable. To reach a more stable state, the temporary merger may fission without formation of a more stable nucleus. Alternatively, the compound nucleus may eject a few neutrons, which would carry away the excitation energy; if the latter is not sufficient for a neutron expulsion, the merger would produce a gamma ray. This happens in about 10^{−16} seconds after the initial nuclear collision and results in creation of a more stable nucleus. The definition by the IUPAC/IUPAP Joint Working Party (JWP) states that a chemical element can only be recognized as discovered if a nucleus of it has not decayed within 10^{−14} seconds. This value was chosen as an estimate of how long it takes a nucleus to acquire electrons and thus display its chemical properties. (Note: This figure also marks the generally accepted upper limit for lifetime of a compound nucleus.)

=== Decay and detection ===
The beam passes through the target and reaches the next chamber, the separator; if a new nucleus is produced, it is carried with this beam. In the separator, the newly produced nucleus is separated from other nuclides (that of the original beam and any other reaction products) (Note: This separation is based on that the resulting nuclei move past the target more slowly then the unreacted beam nuclei. The separator contains electric and magnetic fields whose effects on a moving particle cancel out for a specific velocity of a particle. Such separation can also be aided by a time-of-flight measurement and a recoil energy measurement; a combination of the two may allow to estimate the mass of a nucleus.) and transferred to a surface-barrier detector, which stops the nucleus. The exact location of the upcoming impact on the detector is marked; also marked are its energy and the time of the arrival. The transfer takes about 10^{−6} seconds; in order to be detected, the nucleus must survive this long. The nucleus is recorded again once its decay is registered, and the location, the energy, and the time of the decay are measured.

Stability of a nucleus is provided by the strong interaction. However, its range is very short; as nuclei become larger, its influence on the outermost nucleons (protons and neutrons) weakens. At the same time, the nucleus is torn apart by electrostatic repulsion between protons, and its range is not limited. Total binding energy provided by the strong interaction increases linearly with the number of nucleons, whereas electrostatic repulsion increases with the square of the atomic number, i.e. the latter grows faster and becomes increasingly important for heavy and superheavy nuclei. Superheavy nuclei are thus theoretically predicted and have so far been observed to predominantly decay via decay modes that are caused by such repulsion: alpha decay and spontaneous fission. (Note: Not all decay modes are caused by electrostatic repulsion. For example, beta decay is caused by the weak interaction.) Almost all alpha emitters have over 210 nucleons, and the lightest nuclide primarily undergoing spontaneous fission has 238. In both decay modes, nuclei are inhibited from decaying by corresponding energy barriers for each mode, but they can be tunneled through.

Scheme of an apparatus for creation of superheavy elements, based on the Dubna Gas-Filled Recoil Separator set up in the Flerov Laboratory of Nuclear Reactions in JINR. The trajectory within the detector and the beam focusing apparatus changes because of a dipole magnet in the former and quadrupole magnets in the latter.

Alpha particles are commonly produced in radioactive decays because the mass of an alpha particle per nucleon is small enough to leave some energy for the alpha particle to be used as kinetic energy to leave the nucleus. Spontaneous fission is caused by electrostatic repulsion tearing the nucleus apart and produces various nuclei in different instances of identical nuclei fissioning. As the atomic number increases, spontaneous fission rapidly becomes more important: spontaneous fission partial half-lives decrease by 23 orders of magnitude from uranium (element 92) to nobelium (element 102), and by 30 orders of magnitude from thorium (element 90) to fermium (element 100). The earlier liquid drop model thus suggested that spontaneous fission would occur nearly instantly due to disappearance of the fission barrier for nuclei with about 280 nucleons. The later nuclear shell model suggested that nuclei with about 300 nucleons would form an island of stability in which nuclei will be more resistant to spontaneous fission and will primarily undergo alpha decay with longer half-lives. Subsequent discoveries suggested that the predicted island might be further than originally anticipated; they also showed that nuclei intermediate between the long-lived actinides and the predicted island are deformed, and gain additional stability from shell effects. Experiments on lighter superheavy nuclei, as well as those closer to the expected island, have shown greater than previously anticipated stability against spontaneous fission, showing the importance of shell effects on nuclei. (Note: It was already known by the 1960s that ground states of nuclei differed in energy and shape as well as that certain magic numbers of nucleons corresponded to greater stability of a nucleus. However, it was assumed that there was no nuclear structure in superheavy nuclei as they were too deformed to form one.)

Alpha decays are registered by the emitted alpha particles, and the decay products are easy to determine before the actual decay; if such a decay or a series of consecutive decays produces a known nucleus, the original product of a reaction can be easily determined. (Note: Since mass of a nucleus is not measured directly but is rather calculated from that of another nucleus, such measurement is called indirect. Direct measurements are also possible, but for the most part they have remained unavailable for superheavy nuclei. The first direct measurement of mass of a superheavy nucleus was reported in 2018 at LBNL. Mass was determined from the location of a nucleus after the transfer (the location helps determine its trajectory, which is linked to the mass-to-charge ratio of the nucleus, since the transfer was done in presence of a magnet).) (That all decays within a decay chain were indeed related to each other is established by the location of these decays, which must be in the same place.) The known nucleus can be recognized by the specific characteristics of decay it undergoes such as decay energy (or more specifically, the kinetic energy of the emitted particle). (Note: If the decay occurred in a vacuum, then since total momentum of an isolated system before and after the decay must be preserved, the daughter nucleus would also receive a small velocity. The ratio of the two velocities, and accordingly the ratio of the kinetic energies, would thus be inverse to the ratio of the two masses. The decay energy equals the sum of the known kinetic energy of the alpha particle and that of the daughter nucleus (an exact fraction of the former). The calculations hold for an experiment as well, but the difference is that the nucleus does not move after the decay because it is tied to the detector.) Spontaneous fission, however, produces various nuclei as products, so the original nuclide cannot be determined from its daughters. (Note: Spontaneous fission was discovered by Soviet physicist Georgy Flerov, a leading scientist at JINR, and thus it was a "hobbyhorse" for the facility. In contrast, the LBL scientists believed fission information was not sufficient for a claim of synthesis of an element. They believed spontaneous fission had not been studied enough to use it for identification of a new element, since there was a difficulty of establishing that a compound nucleus had only ejected neutrons and not charged particles like protons or alpha particles. They thus preferred to link new isotopes to the already known ones by successive alpha decays.)

The information available to physicists aiming to synthesize a superheavy element is thus the information collected at the detectors: location, energy, and time of arrival of a particle to the detector, and those of its decay. The physicists analyze this data and seek to conclude that it was indeed caused by a new element and could not have been caused by a different nuclide than the one claimed. Often, provided data is insufficient for a conclusion that a new element was definitely created and there is no other explanation for the observed effects; errors in interpreting data have been made. (Note: For instance, element 102 was mistakenly identified in 1957 at the Nobel Institute of Physics in Stockholm, Stockholm County, Sweden. There were no earlier definitive claims of creation of this element, and the element was assigned a name by its Swedish, American, and British discoverers, nobelium. It was later shown that the identification was incorrect. The following year, RL was unable to reproduce the Swedish results and announced instead their synthesis of the element; that claim was also disproved later. JINR insisted that they were the first to create the element and suggested a name of their own for the new element, joliotium; the Soviet name was also not accepted (JINR later referred to the naming of the element 102 as "hasty"). This name was proposed to IUPAC in a written response to their ruling on priority of discovery claims of elements, signed 29 September 1992. The name "nobelium" remained unchanged on account of its widespread usage.)

== History ==
=== Synthesis attempts ===
The first and only attempt to synthesize unbihexium, which was unsuccessful, was performed in 1971 at CERN (European Organization for Nuclear Research) by René Bimbot and John M. Alexander using the hot fusion reaction:

^{232}_{90}Th + ^{84}_{36}Kr → ^{316}_{126}Ubh* → no atoms

High-energy (13-15 MeV) alpha particles were observed and taken as possible evidence for the synthesis of unbihexium. Subsequent unsuccessful experiments with higher sensitivity suggest that the 10 mb sensitivity of this experiment was too low; hence, the formation of unbihexium nuclei in this reaction was deemed highly unlikely.

=== Possible natural occurrence ===
A study in 1976 by a group of American researchers from several universities proposed that primordial superheavy elements, mainly livermorium, unbiquadium, unbihexium, and unbiseptium, with half-lives exceeding 500 million years could be a cause of unexplained radiation damage (particularly radiohalos) in minerals. This prompted many researchers to search for them in nature from 1976 to 1983. A group led by Tom Cahill, a professor at the University of California at Davis, claimed in 1976 that they had detected alpha particles and X-rays with the right energies to cause the damage observed, supporting the presence of these elements, especially unbihexium. Others claimed that none had been detected, and questioned the proposed characteristics of primordial superheavy nuclei. In particular, they cited that the magic number N = 228 necessary for enhanced stability would create a neutron-excessive nucleus in unbihexium that might not be beta-stable, although several calculations suggest that ^{354}Ubh may indeed be stable against beta decay. This activity was also proposed to be caused by nuclear transmutations in natural cerium, raising further ambiguity upon this claimed observation of superheavy elements.

Unbihexium has received particular attention in these investigations, for its speculated location in the island of stability may increase its abundance relative to other superheavy elements. Any naturally occurring unbihexium is predicted to be chemically similar to plutonium and may exist with primordial ^{244}Pu in the rare earth mineral bastnäsite. In particular, plutonium and unbihexium are predicted to have similar valence configurations, leading to the existence of unbihexium in the +4 oxidation state. Therefore, should unbihexium occur naturally, it may be possible to extract it using similar techniques for the accumulation of cerium and plutonium. Likewise, unbihexium could also exist in monazite with other lanthanides and actinides that would be chemically similar. Recent doubt on the existence of primordial ^{244}Pu casts uncertainty on these predictions, however, as the nonexistence (or minimal existence) of plutonium in bastnäsite will inhibit possible identification of unbihexium as its heavier congener.

The possible extent of primordial superheavy elements on Earth today is uncertain. Even if they are confirmed to have caused the radiation damage long ago, they might now have decayed to mere traces, or even be completely gone. It is also uncertain if such superheavy nuclei may be produced naturally at all, as spontaneous fission is expected to terminate the r-process responsible for heavy element formation between mass number 270 and 290, well before elements such as unbihexium may be formed.

A recent hypothesis tries to explain the spectrum of Przybylski's Star by naturally occurring flerovium, unbinilium, and unbihexium.

=== Naming ===
Using the 1979 IUPAC recommendations, the element should be temporarily called unbihexium (symbol Ubh) until it is discovered, the discovery is confirmed, and a permanent name chosen. Although widely used in the chemical community on all levels, from chemistry classrooms to advanced textbooks, the recommendations are mostly ignored among scientists who work theoretically or experimentally on superheavy elements, who call it "element 126", with the symbol E126, (126), or 126. Some researchers have also referred to unbihexium as eka-plutonium, a name derived from the system Dmitri Mendeleev used to predict unknown elements, though such an extrapolation might not work for g-block elements with no known congeners, and eka-plutonium would instead refer to element 146 or 148 when the term is meant to denote the element directly below plutonium.

== Prospects for future synthesis ==
Every element from mendelevium onward was produced in fusion-evaporation reactions, culminating in the discovery of the heaviest known element, oganesson, in 2002 and most recently tennessine in 2010. These reactions approached the limit of current technology; for example, the synthesis of tennessine required 22 milligrams of ^{249}Bk and an intense ^{48}Ca beam for six months. The intensity of beams in superheavy element research cannot exceed 10^{12} projectiles per second without damaging the target and detector, and producing larger quantities of increasingly rare and unstable actinide targets is impractical. Consequently, future experiments must be done at facilities such as the superheavy element factory (SHE-factory) at the Joint Institute for Nuclear Research (JINR) or RIKEN, which will allow experiments to run for longer time periods with increased detection capabilities and enable otherwise inaccessible reactions. Even so, it will likely be a great challenge to synthesize elements beyond unbinilium (120) or unbiunium (121), given their short predicted half-lives and low predicted cross sections.

It has been suggested that fusion-evaporation will not be feasible to reach unbihexium. As ^{48}Ca cannot be used for synthesis of elements beyond atomic number 118 or possibly 119, the only alternatives are increasing the atomic number of the projectile or studying symmetric or near-symmetric reactions. One calculation suggests that the cross section for producing unbihexium from ^{249}Cf and ^{64}Ni may be as low as nine orders of magnitude lower than the detection limit; such results are also suggested by the non-observation of unbinilium and unbibium in reactions with heavier projectiles and experimental cross section limits. If Z = 126 represents a closed proton shell, compound nuclei may have greater survival probability and the use of ^{64}Ni may be more feasible for producing nuclei with 122 < Z < 126, especially for compound nuclei near the closed shell at N = 184. However, the cross section still might not exceed 1 fb, posing an obstacle that may only be overcome with more sensitive equipment.

== Predicted properties ==
=== Nuclear stability and isotopes ===
This nuclear chart used by the Japan Atomic Energy Agency predicts the decay modes of nuclei up to Z = 149 and N = 256. At Z = 126 (top right), the beta-stability line passes through a region of instability towards spontaneous fission (half-lives less than 1 nanosecond) and extends into a "cape" of stability near the N = 228 shell closure, where an island of stability centered at the possibly doubly magic isotope ^{354}Ubh may exist.

This diagram depicts shell gaps in the nuclear shell model. Shell gaps are created when more energy is required to reach the shell at the next higher energy level, thus resulting in a particularly stable configuration. For protons, the shell gap at Z = 82 corresponds to the peak of stability at lead, and while there is disagreement of the magicity of Z = 114 and Z = 120, a shell gap appears at Z = 126, thus suggesting that there may be a proton shell closure at unbihexium.

Extensions of the nuclear shell model predicted that the next magic numbers after Z = 82 and N = 126 (corresponding to ^{208}Pb, the heaviest stable nucleus) were Z = 126 and N = 184, making ^{310}Ubh the next candidate for a doubly magic nucleus. These speculations led to interest in the stability of unbihexium as early as 1957; Gertrude Scharff Goldhaber was one of the first physicists to predict a region of increased stability in the vicinity of, and possibly centered at, unbihexium. This notion of an "island of stability" comprising longer-lived superheavy nuclei was popularized by University of California professor Glenn Seaborg in the 1960s.

In this region of the periodic table, N = 184 and N = 228 have been suggested as closed neutron shells, and various atomic numbers, including Z = 126, have been proposed as closed proton shells. (Note: Atomic numbers 114, 120, 122, 124 have also been suggested as closed proton shells in different models.) The extent of stabilizing effects in the region of unbihexium is uncertain, however, due to predictions of shifting or weakening of the proton shell closure and possible loss of double magicity. More recent research predicts the island of stability to instead be centered at beta-stable isotopes of copernicium (^{291}Cn and ^{293}Cn) or flerovium (Z = 114), which would place unbihexium well above the island and result in short half-lives regardless of shell effects.

Earlier models suggested the existence of long-lived nuclear isomers resistant to spontaneous fission in the region near ^{310}Ubh, with half-lives on the order of millions or billions of years. However, more rigorous calculations as early as the 1970s yielded contradictory results; it is now believed that the island of stability is not centered at ^{310}Ubh, and thus will not enhance the stability of this nuclide. Instead, ^{310}Ubh is thought to be very neutron-deficient and susceptible to alpha decay and spontaneous fission in less than a microsecond, and it may even lie at or beyond the proton drip line. A 2016 calculation on the decay properties of ^{288–339}Ubh upholds these predictions; the isotopes lighter than ^{313}Ubh (including ^{310}Ubh) may indeed lie beyond the drip line and decay by proton emission, ^{313–327}Ubh will alpha decay, possibly reaching flerovium and livermorium isotopes, and heavier isotopes will decay by spontaneous fission. This study and a quantum tunneling model predict alpha-decay half-lives under a microsecond for isotopes lighter than ^{318}Ubh, rendering them impossible to identify experimentally. (Note: While such nuclei may be synthesized and a series of decay signals may be registered, decays faster than one microsecond may pile up with subsequent signals and thus be indistinguishable, especially when multiple uncharacterized nuclei may be formed and emit a series of similar alpha particles. The main difficulty is thus attributing the decays to the correct parent nucleus, as a superheavy atom that decays before reaching the detector will not be registered at all.) Hence, the isotopes ^{318–327}Ubh may be synthesized and detected, and may even constitute a region of increased stability against fission around N ~ 198 with half-lives up to several seconds, though such a region of increased stability is completely absent in other models.

A "sea of instability" defined by very low fission barriers (caused by greatly increasing Coulomb repulsion in superheavy elements) and consequently fission half-lives on the order of 10^{−18} seconds is predicted across various models. Although the exact limit of stability for half-lives over one microsecond varies, stability against fission is strongly dependent on the N = 184 and N = 228 shell closures and rapidly drops off immediately beyond the influence of the shell closure. Such an effect may be reduced, however, if nuclear deformation in intermediate isotopes may lead to a shift in magic numbers; a similar phenomenon was observed in the deformed doubly magic nucleus ^{270}Hs. This shift could then lead to longer half-lives, perhaps on the order of days, for isotopes such as ^{342}Ubh that would also lie on the beta-stability line. A second island of stability for spherical nuclei may exist in unbihexium isotopes with many more neutrons, centered at ^{354}Ubh and conferring additional stability in N = 228 isotones near the beta-stability line. Originally, a short half-life of 39 milliseconds was predicted for ^{354}Ubh toward spontaneous fission, though a partial alpha half-life for this isotope was predicted to be 18 years. More recent analysis suggests that this isotope may have a half-life on the order of 100 years should the closed shells have strong stabilizing effects, placing it at the peak of an island of stability. It may also be possible that ^{354}Ubh is not doubly magic, as the Z = 126 shell is predicted to be relatively weak, or in some calculations, completely nonexistent. This suggests that any relative stability in unbihexium isotopes would be only due to neutron shell closures that may or may not have a stabilizing effect at Z = 126.

=== Chemical ===
Unbihexium is expected to be the sixth member of a superactinide series. It may have similarities to plutonium, as both elements have eight valence electrons over a noble gas core. In the superactinide series, the Aufbau principle is expected to break down due to relativistic effects, and an overlap of the energy levels of the 7d, 8p, and especially 5g and 6f orbitals is expected, which renders predictions of chemical and atomic properties of these elements very difficult. The ground state electron configuration of unbihexium is thus predicted to be [Og] 5g^{2} 6f^{2} 7d^{1} 8s^{2} 8p^{1} or 5g^{1} 6f^{4} 8s^{2} 8p^{1}, in contrast to [Og] 5g^{6} 8s^{2} derived from Aufbau.

As with the other early superactinides, it is predicted that unbihexium will be able to lose all eight valence electrons in chemical reactions, rendering a variety of oxidation states up to +8 possible. The +4 oxidation state is predicted to be most common, in addition to +2 and +6. Unbihexium should be able to form the tetroxide UbhO_{4} and hexahalides UbhF_{6} and UbhCl_{6}, the latter with a fairly strong bond dissociation energy of 2.68 eV. Calculations suggest that a diatomic UbhF molecule will feature a bond between the 5g orbital in unbihexium and the 2p orbital in fluorine, thus characterizing unbihexium as an element whose 5g electrons should actively participate in bonding. It is also predicted that the Ubh^{6+} (in particular, in UbhF_{6}) and Ubh^{7+} ions will have the electron configurations [Og] 5g^{2} and [Og] 5g^{1}, respectively, in contrast to the [Og] 6f^{1} configuration seen in Ubt^{4+} and Ubq^{5+} that bears more resemblance to their actinide homologs. The activity of 5g electrons may influence the chemistry of superactinides such as unbihexium in new ways that are difficult to predict, as no known elements have electrons in a g orbital in the ground state.

== See also ==
- Island of stability: flerovium–unbinilium–unbihexium

== Bibliography ==
- Audi, G.; Kondev, F. G.; Wang, M.; et al. (2017). "The NUBASE2016 evaluation of nuclear properties". Chinese Physics C. 41 (3). 030001. Bibcode:2017ChPhC..41c0001A. doi:10.1088/1674-1137/41/3/030001.
  pp. 030001-1–030001-17, pp. 030001-18–030001-138, Table I. The NUBASE2016 table of nuclear and decay properties
- Beiser, A. (2003). Concepts of modern physics (6th ed.). McGraw-Hill. ISBN 978-0-07-244848-1. OCLC 48965418.
- Hoffman, D. C.; Ghiorso, A.; Seaborg, G. T. (2000). The Transuranium People: The Inside Story. World Scientific. ISBN 978-1-78-326244-1.
- Kragh, H. (2018). From Transuranic to Superheavy Elements: A Story of Dispute and Creation. Springer. ISBN 978-3-319-75813-8.
- Zagrebaev, V.; Karpov, A.; Greiner, W. (2013). "Future of superheavy element research: Which nuclei could be synthesized within the next few years?" (PDF). Journal of Physics: Conference Series. 420 (1). 012001. arXiv:1207.5700. Bibcode:2013JPhCS.420a2001Z. doi:10.1088/1742-6596/420/1/012001. ISSN 1742-6588. S2CID 55434734. Archived from the original (PDF) on 2015-10-03.
