= Isotopes of ununennium =

Ununennium (_{119}Uue) has not yet been synthesised, so there is no experimental data and a standard atomic weight cannot be given. Like all synthetic elements, it would have no stable isotopes.

== List of isotopes ==
No isotopes of ununennium are known.

== Nucleosynthesis ==
=== Target-projectile combinations leading to Z = 119 compound nuclei ===
The below table contains various combinations of targets and projectiles that could be used to form compound nuclei with Z = 119.

Target	Projectile	CN	Attempt result
^{208}Pb	^{87}Rb	^{295}Uue	Reaction yet to be attempted
^{209}Bi	^{86}Kr	^{295}Uue	Reaction yet to be attempted
^{238}U	^{59}Co	^{297}Uue	Reaction yet to be attempted
^{237}Np	^{58}Fe	^{295}Uue	Reaction yet to be attempted
^{244}Pu	^{55}Mn	^{299}Uue	Reaction yet to be attempted
^{243}Am	^{54}Cr	^{297}Uue	Reaction yet to be attempted
^{248}Cm	^{51}V	^{299}Uue	Reaction being attempted
^{250}Cm	^{51}V	^{301}Uue	Reaction yet to be attempted
^{249}Bk	^{50}Ti	^{299}Uue	Reaction being attempted
^{249}Cf	^{45}Sc	^{294}Uue	Reaction yet to be attempted
^{254}Es	^{48}Ca	^{302}Uue	Failure to date

=== Cold fusion ===
Following the claimed synthesis of ^{293}Og in 1999 at the Lawrence Berkeley National Laboratory from ^{208}Pb and ^{86}Kr, the analogous reactions ^{209}Bi + ^{86}Kr and ^{208}Pb + ^{87}Rb were proposed for the synthesis of element 119 and its then-unknown alpha decay daughters, elements 117, 115, and 113. The retraction of these results in 2001 and more recent calculations on the cross sections for "cold" fusion reactions cast doubt on this possibility; for example, a maximum yield of 2 fb is predicted for the production of ^{294}Uue in the former reaction. Radioactive ion beams may provide an alternative method utilizing a lead or bismuth target, and may enable the production of more neutron-rich isotopes should they become available at required intensities.

=== Hot fusion ===
==== ^{243}Am(^{54}Cr,xn)^{297−x}Uue ====
There are indications that the team at the Joint Institute for Nuclear Research (JINR) in Russia plans to try this reaction in the future. The product of the 3n channel would be ^{294}Uue; its expected granddaughter ^{286}Mc was synthesised in a preparatory experiment at the JINR in 2021, using the reaction ^{243}Am(^{48}Ca,5n)^{286}Mc.

The team at the Heavy Ion Research Facility in Lanzhou (HIRFL), which is operated by the Institute of Modern Physics (IMP) of the Chinese Academy of Sciences, also plans to try the ^{243}Am+^{54}Cr reaction.

==== ^{248}Cm(^{51}V,xn)^{299−x}Uue ====
The team at RIKEN in Wakō, Japan began bombarding curium-248 targets with a vanadium-51 beam in January 2018 to search for element 119. Curium was chosen as a target, rather than heavier berkelium or californium, as these heavier targets are difficult to prepare. The reduced asymmetry of the reaction is expected to approximately halve the cross section, requiring a sensitivity "on the order of at least 30 fb". The ^{248}Cm targets were provided by Oak Ridge National Laboratory. RIKEN developed a high-intensity vanadium beam. The experiment began at a cyclotron while RIKEN upgraded its linear accelerators; the upgrade was completed in 2020. Bombardment may be continued with both machines until the first event is observed. The RIKEN team's efforts are being financed by the Emperor of Japan.

^{248}_{96}Cm + ^{51}_{23}V → ^{299}_{119}Uue* → no atoms yet

The produced isotopes of ununennium are expected to undergo two alpha decays to known isotopes of moscovium (^{288}Mc and ^{287}Mc respectively), which would anchor them to a known sequence of five further alpha decays and corroborate their production. In 2022, the optimal reaction energy for synthesis of ununennium in this reaction was experimentally estimated as 234.8±1.8 MeV at RIKEN. The cross section is probably below 10 fb.

As of September 2023, the team at RIKEN had run the ^{248}Cm+^{51}V reaction for 462 days. A report by the RIKEN Nishina Center Advisory Committee noted that this reaction was chosen because of the availability of the target and projectile materials, despite predictions favoring the ^{249}Bk+^{50}Ti reaction, owing to the ^{50}Ti projectile being closer to doubly magic ^{48}Ca and having an even atomic number (22); reactions with even-Z projectiles have generally been shown to have greater cross-sections. The report recommended that if the 5 fb cross-section limit is reached without any events observed, then the team should "evaluate and eventually reconsider the experimental strategy before taking additional beam time." As of August 2024, the team at RIKEN was still running this reaction "24/7".

==== ^{249}Bk(^{50}Ti,xn)^{299−x}Uue ====
From April to September 2012, an attempt to synthesize the isotopes ^{295}Uue and ^{296}Uue was made by bombarding a target of berkelium-249 with titanium-50 at the GSI Helmholtz Centre for Heavy Ion Research in Darmstadt, Germany. This reaction between ^{249}Bk and ^{50}Ti was predicted to be the most favorable practical reaction for formation of ununennium, as it is rather asymmetrical, though also somewhat cold. (The reaction between ^{254}Es and ^{48}Ca would be superior, but preparing milligram quantities of ^{254}Es for a target is difficult.) Moreover, as berkelium-249 decays to californium-249 (the next element) with a short half-life of 327 days, this allowed elements 119 and 120 to be searched for simultaneously. Nevertheless, the necessary change from the "silver bullet" ^{48}Ca to ^{50}Ti divides the expected yield of ununennium by about twenty, as the yield is strongly dependent on the asymmetry of the fusion reaction. Due to the predicted short half-lives, the GSI team used new "fast" electronics capable of registering decay events within microseconds.

^{249}_{97}Bk + ^{50}_{22}Ti → ^{299}_{119}Uue* → no atoms
^{249}_{98}Cf + ^{50}_{22}Ti → ^{299}_{120}Ubn* → no atoms

Neither element 119 nor element 120 was observed. This implied a limiting cross-section of 65 fb for producing element 119 in these reactions, and 200 fb for element 120. The predicted actual cross section for producing element 119 in this reaction is around 40 fb, which is at the limits of current technology. (The record lowest cross section of an experimentally successful reaction is 30 fb for the reaction between ^{209}Bi and ^{70}Zn producing nihonium.) The experiment was originally planned to continue to November 2012, but was stopped early to make use of the ^{249}Bk target to confirm the synthesis of tennessine (thus changing the projectiles to ^{48}Ca).

The team at the Joint Institute for Nuclear Research in Dubna, Russia, has planned to attempt this reaction since the 2010s. According to Yuri Oganessian, the experiment was set to begin in May 2026. Initial results are expected to be announced in September to October 2026. As of June 2026, the obtained sensitivity of the experiment is 480 fb; according to Vladimir Utyonkov, a sensitivity of 180–200 fb would be needed to observe one event.

==== ^{254}Es(^{48}Ca,xn)^{302−x}Uue ====
The synthesis of ununennium was first attempted in 1985 by bombarding a sub-microgram target of einsteinium-254 with calcium-48 ions at the superHILAC accelerator at Berkeley, California:

^{254}_{99}Es + ^{48}_{20}Ca → ^{302}_{119}Uue* → no atoms

No atoms were identified, leading to a limiting cross section of 300 nb. Later calculations suggest that the cross section of the 3n reaction (which would result in ^{299}Uue and three neutrons as products) would actually be six hundred thousand times lower than this upper bound, at 0.5 pb. Tens of milligrams of einsteinium, an amount that cannot presently be produced, would be needed for this reaction to have a reasonable chance of succeeding.

== Sources ==
- Hoffman, D. C.; Ghiorso, A.; Seaborg, G. T. (2000). The Transuranium People: The Inside Story. World Scientific. ISBN 978-1-78-326244-1.
- Zagrebaev, V.; Karpov, A.; Greiner, W. (2013). "Future of superheavy element research: Which nuclei could be synthesized within the next few years?" (PDF). Journal of Physics: Conference Series. 420 (1). 012001. arXiv:1207.5700. Bibcode:2013JPhCS.420a2001Z. doi:10.1088/1742-6596/420/1/012001. ISSN 1742-6588. S2CID 55434734. Archived from the original (PDF) on 2015-10-03.
