= Isotopes of unbinilium =

Unbinilium (_{120}Ubn) has not yet been synthesised, so there is no experimental data and a standard atomic weight cannot be given. Like all synthetic elements, it would have no stable isotopes.

== List of isotopes ==
No isotopes of unbinilium are known.

== Nucleosynthesis ==
=== Target-projectile combinations leading to Z = 120 compound nuclei ===
The below table contains various combinations of targets and projectiles that could be used to form compound nuclei with Z = 120.

| Target | Projectile | CN | Attempt result |
|---|---|---|---|
| ^{208}Pb | ^{88}Sr | ^{296}Ubn | Reaction yet to be attempted |
| ^{238}U | ^{64}Ni | ^{302}Ubn | Failure to date |
| ^{237}Np | ^{59}Co | ^{296}Ubn | Reaction yet to be attempted |
| ^{244}Pu | ^{58}Fe | ^{302}Ubn | Failure to date |
| ^{244}Pu | ^{60}Fe | ^{304}Ubn | Reaction yet to be attempted |
| ^{243}Am | ^{55}Mn | ^{298}Ubn | Reaction yet to be attempted |
| ^{245}Cm | ^{54}Cr | ^{299}Ubn | Reaction yet to be attempted |
| ^{246}Cm | ^{54}Cr | ^{300}Ubn | Reaction yet to be attempted |
| ^{248}Cm | ^{54}Cr | ^{302}Ubn | Failure to date |
| ^{250}Cm | ^{54}Cr | ^{304}Ubn | Reaction yet to be attempted |
| ^{249}Bk | ^{51}V | ^{300}Ubn | Reaction yet to be attempted |
| ^{249}Cf | ^{50}Ti | ^{299}Ubn | Reaction being attempted |
| ^{250}Cf | ^{50}Ti | ^{300}Ubn | Reaction yet to be attempted |
| ^{251}Cf | ^{50}Ti | ^{301}Ubn | Reaction yet to be attempted |
| ^{252}Cf | ^{50}Ti | ^{302}Ubn | Reaction yet to be attempted |
| ^{257}Fm | ^{48}Ca | ^{305}Ubn | Reaction yet to be attempted |

=== Hot fusion ===
==== ^{238}U(^{64}Ni,xn)^{302-x}Ubn ====
In April 2007, the team at the GSI Helmholtz Centre for Heavy Ion Research in Darmstadt, Germany attempted to create unbinilium using a ^{238}U target and a ^{64}Ni beam:

^{238}_{92}U + ^{64}_{28}Ni → ^{302}_{120}Ubn* → no atoms

No atoms were detected, providing a limit of 1.6 pb for the cross section at the energy provided. The GSI repeated the experiment with higher sensitivity in three separate runs in April–May 2007, January–March 2008, and September–October 2008, all with negative results, reaching a cross section limit of 90 fb.

==== ^{244}Pu(^{58}Fe,xn)^{302-x}Ubn ====
Following their success in obtaining oganesson by the reaction between ^{249}Cf and ^{48}Ca in 2006, the team at the Joint Institute for Nuclear Research (JINR) in Dubna started experiments in March–April 2007 to attempt to create unbinilium with a ^{58}Fe beam and a ^{244}Pu target. Initial analysis revealed that no atoms of unbinilium were produced, providing a limit of 400 fb for the cross section at the energy studied.

^{244}_{94}Pu + ^{58}_{26}Fe → ^{302}_{120}Ubn* → no atoms

The Russian team planned to upgrade their facilities before attempting the reaction again.

==== ^{245}Cm(^{54}Cr,xn)^{299-x}Ubn ====
There are indications that this reaction may be tried by the JINR in the future. The expected products of the 3n and 4n channels, ^{296}Ubn and ^{295}Ubn, could undergo five alpha decays to reach the darmstadtium isotopes ^{276}Ds and ^{275}Ds respectively; these darmstadtium isotopes were synthesised at the JINR in 2022 and 2023 respectively, both in the ^{232}Th+^{48}Ca reaction.

==== ^{248}Cm(^{54}Cr,xn)^{302-x}Ubn ====
In 2011, after upgrading their equipment to allow the use of more radioactive targets, scientists at the GSI attempted the rather asymmetrical fusion reaction:

^{248}_{96}Cm + ^{54}_{24}Cr → ^{302}_{120}Ubn* → no atoms

It was expected that the change in reaction would quintuple the probability of synthesizing unbinilium, as the yield of such reactions is strongly dependent on their asymmetry. Although this reaction is less asymmetric than the ^{249}Cf+^{50}Ti reaction, it also creates more neutron-rich unbinilium isotopes that should receive increased stability from their proximity to the shell closure at N = 184. Three signals were observed in May 2011; a possible assignment to ^{299}Ubn and its daughters was considered, but could not be confirmed, and a different analysis suggested that what was observed was simply a random sequence of events.

In March 2022, Yuri Oganessian gave a seminar at the JINR considering how one could synthesise element 120 in the ^{248}Cm+^{54}Cr reaction. In 2023, the director of the JINR, Grigory Trubnikov, stated that he hoped that the experiments to synthesise element 120 will begin in 2025.

==== ^{249}Cf(^{50}Ti,xn)^{299-x}Ubn ====
In August–October 2011, a different team at the GSI using the TASCA facility tried a new, even more asymmetrical reaction:

^{249}_{98}Cf + ^{50}_{22}Ti → ^{299}_{120}Ubn* → no atoms

Because of its asymmetry, the reaction between ^{249}Cf and ^{50}Ti was predicted to be the most favorable practical reaction for synthesizing unbinilium, although it is also somewhat cold, and is further away from the neutron shell closure at N = 184 than any of the other three reactions attempted. No unbinilium atoms were identified, implying a limiting cross section of 200 fb. Jens Volker Kratz predicted the actual maximum cross section for producing unbinilium by any of the four reactions ^{238}U+^{64}Ni, ^{244}Pu+^{58}Fe, ^{248}Cm+^{54}Cr, or ^{249}Cf+^{50}Ti to be around 0.1 fb; in comparison, the world record for the smallest cross section of a successful reaction was 30 fb for the reaction ^{209}Bi(^{70}Zn,n)^{278}Nh, and Kratz predicted a maximum cross section of 20 fb for producing ununennium. If these predictions are accurate, then synthesizing ununennium would be at the limits of current technology, and synthesizing unbinilium would require new methods.

This reaction was investigated again in April to September 2012 at the GSI. This experiment used a ^{249}Bk target and a ^{50}Ti beam to produce element 119, but since ^{249}Bk decays to ^{249}Cf with a half-life of about 327 days, both elements 119 and 120 could be searched for simultaneously:

^{249}_{97}Bk + ^{50}_{22}Ti → ^{299}_{119}Uue* → no atoms
^{249}_{98}Cf + ^{50}_{22}Ti → ^{299}_{120}Ubn* → no atoms

Neither element 119 nor element 120 was observed. This implied a limiting cross section of 65 fb for producing element 119 in these reactions, and 200 fb for element 120.

In May 2021, the JINR announced plans to investigate the ^{249}Cf+^{50}Ti reaction in their new facility. The ^{249}Cf target would have been produced by the Oak Ridge National Laboratory in Oak Ridge, Tennessee, United States; the ^{50}Ti beam would be produced by the Hubert Curien Pluridisciplinary Institute in Strasbourg, Alsace, France. However, after the Russian invasion of Ukraine began in 2022, collaboration between the JINR and other institutes completely ceased due to sanctions. Thus, the JINR's plans have since shifted to the ^{248}Cm+^{54}Cr reaction, where the target and projectile beam could both be made in Russia.

Starting from 2022, plans began to be made to use the 88-inch cyclotron in the Lawrence Berkeley National Laboratory (LBNL) in Berkeley, California, United States to attempt to make new elements using ^{50}Ti projectiles. The plan was to first test them on a plutonium target to create livermorium (element 116), which was successful in 2024. Thus, an attempt to make element 120 in the ^{249}Cf+^{50}Ti reaction was planned for 2025. By June 2025, updates were underway at the LBNL in preparation for the search for element 120, and by September, the search had begun.

== Sources ==
- Zagrebaev, V.; Karpov, A.; Greiner, W. (2013). "Future of superheavy element research: Which nuclei could be synthesized within the next few years?" (PDF). Journal of Physics: Conference Series. 420 (1). 012001. arXiv:1207.5700. Bibcode:2013JPhCS.420a2001Z. doi:10.1088/1742-6596/420/1/012001. ISSN 1742-6588. S2CID 55434734. Archived from the original (PDF) on 2015-10-03.
