= Vilen Strutinsky =

Soviet nuclear physicist

- Born: Vilen Mitrofanovich Strutinsky; 16 October 1929; Odesa, Ukraine
- Died: 28 June 1993 (aged 63); Rome, Italy
- Known for: Strutinsky smoothing method Strutinsky energy theorem
- Scientific career
- Fields: Nuclear physics

Vilen Mitrofanovich Strutinsky (Russian: Вилен Митрофанович Струтинский; 16 October 1929 – 28 June 1993) was a Soviet nuclear physicist.

== Life and career ==
Strutinsky graduated from secondary school in 1946 in Odesa (after his family during World War II had been evacuated to Yekaterinburg). He graduated in theoretical physics in 1952 from Kharkiv University. From 1953 to 1970 he worked at the department of nuclear theory in the Kurchatov Institute in Moscow. In 1959 he defended his PhD at the National Research Nuclear University MEPhI, and in 1965 he received the habilitation from the Joint Institute for Nuclear Research. He was a visiting scientist in 1956 in the Netherlands, in 1957–1958 at the Niels Bohr Institute in Copenhagen, in 1960 in Canada, and in 1963–1964 in the United States.

In 1966, Strutinsky made a breakthrough concerning the problem of incorporating shell effects into nuclear deformation energies higher than those of the liquid drop model (LDM). For this problem he devised an averaging method, now known as the Strutinsky smoothing method. At a 1969 Symposium in Lysekil, Sweden, he presented the results of applying his shell-correction method to calculating fission barriers, giving a physical explanation of the fission isomer — this was an experimental fact which had not yet been explained theoretically. The Strutinsky energy theorem and Strutinsky shell-corrections are applicable to various many-fermion systems, such as metal clusters and semiconductor quantum dots.

In 1967–1970 Strutinsky worked at the Niels Bohr Institute in Copenhagen as the head of the group of physicists that was set up to develop his theory of deformed nuclei. In the early 1970s in Kyiv, Strutinsky formulated with his collaborators a general theory of the shell phenomenon. They showed that the shell structure of nucleonic spectra is a characteristic feature of any finite quantum system.

In the 1970s, Strutinsky led a research group at the Kyiv Institute of Nuclear Research (KINR). They worked on many body theory and various aspects of nuclear dynamics. Strutinsky, in collaboration with Alexander G. Magner, extended Gutzwiller's semiclassical theory of shell structure (Gutzwiller trace formula) to a quasiclassical theory of the nuclear shell structure (1977). This extension enabled physicists to derive new results for realistic shell-model potentials, for systems with continuous symmetries, and for systems with mixed symmetries.

In the 1980s, Strutinsky worked on correlations in partial waves in heavy-ion deep inelastic collisions. In 1991, he was a visiting scientist in the nuclear theory group at the Technical University of Munich. In 1992–1993, he was a visiting professor at the Istituto Nazionale di Fisica Nucleare in Italy.

== Awards and honors ==
- 1978: Tom W. Bonner Prize in Nuclear Physics
- 1979: Honorary Doctorate from the University of Copenhagen
- 1991: Humboldt Prize (1991).

== Selected publications ==
- Strutinsky Nuclear deformation energy, Sov. J. Nucl. Phys., vol. 3, 1966, p. 449
- Strutinsky, V.M. (1967). "Shell effects in nuclear masses and deformation energies". Nuclear Physics A. 95 (2): 420–442. Bibcode:1967NuPhA..95..420S. doi:10.1016/0375-9474(67)90510-6.
- Strutinsky, V.M. (1968). ""Shells" in deformed nuclei". Nuclear Physics A. 122 (1): 1–33. Bibcode:1968NuPhA.122....1S. doi:10.1016/0375-9474(68)90699-4.
- Damgaard, J.; Pauli, H.C.; Pashkevich, V.V.; Strutinsky, V.M. (1969). "A method for solving the independent-particle Schrödinger equation with a deformed average field". Nuclear Physics A. 135 (2): 432. Bibcode:1969NuPhA.135..432D. doi:10.1016/0375-9474(69)90174-2.
- Brack, M.; Damgaard, Jens; Jensen, A. S.; Pauli, H. C.; Strutinsky, V. M.; Wong, C. Y. (1972). "Funny Hills: The Shell-Correction Approach to Nuclear Shell Effects and Its Applications to the Fission Process" (PDF). Reviews of Modern Physics. 44 (2): 320. Bibcode:1972RvMP...44..320B. doi:10.1103/RevModPhys.44.320.
- Strutinsky Semiclassical theory of nuclear shell structure, Nucleonica, vol. 20, 1975, pp. 679–716
