= Block (periodic table) =

Set of adjacent groups

Blocks s, f, d, and p in the periodic table

A block of the periodic table is a set of elements unified by the atomic orbitals their valence electrons or vacancies lie in. The term seems to have been first used by Charles Janet. Each block is named after its characteristic orbital: s-block, p-block, d-block, f-block and g-block.

The block names (s, p, d, and f) are derived from the spectroscopic notation for the value of an electron's azimuthal quantum number: sharp (0), principal (1), diffuse (2), and fundamental (3). Succeeding notations proceed in alphabetical order, as g, h, etc., though elements that would belong in such blocks have not yet been found.

== Characteristics ==
The division into blocks is justified by their distinctive nature: s is characterized, except in H and He, by highly electropositive metals; p by a range of very distinctive metals and non-metals, many of them essential to life; d by metals with multiple oxidation states; f by metals so similar that their separation is problematic. Useful statements about the elements can be made on the basis of the block they belong to and their position in it, for example highest oxidation state, density, melting point ... Electronegativity is rather systematically distributed across and between blocks.

— P. J. Stewart
In Foundations of Chemistry, 2017

There is an approximate correspondence between this nomenclature of blocks, based on electronic configuration, and sets of elements based on chemical properties. The s-block and p-block together are usually considered main-group elements, the d-block corresponds to the transition metals, and the f-block corresponds to the inner transition metals and encompasses nearly all of the lanthanides (like lanthanum, praseodymium and dysprosium) and the actinides (like actinium, uranium and einsteinium).

The group 12 elements zinc, cadmium, and mercury are sometimes regarded as main group, rather than transition group, because they are chemically and physically more similar to the p-block elements than the other d-block elements. The group 3 elements are occasionally considered main group elements due to their similarities to the s-block elements. However, they remain d-block elements even when considered to be main group.

Groups (columns) in the f-block (between groups 2 and 3) are not numbered.

Helium is an s-block element, with its outer (and only) electrons in the 1s atomic orbital, although its chemical properties are more similar to the p-block noble gases in group 18 due to its full shell.

=== s-block ===
Na, K, Mg and Ca are essential in biological systems. Some ... other s-block elements are used in medicine (e.g. Li and Ba) and/or occur as minor but useful contaminants in Ca bio-minerals e.g. Sr…These metals display only one stable oxidation state [+1 or +2]. This enables [their] ... ions to move around the cell without…danger of being oxidized or reduced.

— Wilkins, R. G. and Wilkins, P. C. (2003)
The role of calcium and comparable cations in animal behaviour, RSC, Cambridge, p. 1

The s-block, with the s standing for "sharp" and azimuthal quantum number 0, is on the left side of the conventional periodic table and is composed of elements from the first two columns plus one element in the rightmost column, the nonmetals hydrogen and helium and the alkali metals (in group 1) and alkaline earth metals (group 2). Their general valence configuration is ns^{1–2}. Helium is an s-element, but nearly always finds its place to the far right in group 18, above the p-element neon. Each row of the table has two s-elements.

The metals of the s-block (from the second period onwards) are mostly soft and have generally low melting and boiling points. Most impart colour to a flame.

Chemically, all s-elements except helium are highly reactive. Metals of the s-block are highly electropositive and often form essentially ionic compounds with nonmetals, especially with the highly electronegative halogen nonmetals.

=== p-block ===
The p-block, with the p standing for "principal" and azimuthal quantum number 1, is on the right side of the standard periodic table and encompasses elements in groups 13 to 18. Their general electronic configuration is ns^{2} np^{1–6}. Helium, though being the first element in group 18, is not included in the p-block. Each row of the table has a place for six p-elements except for the first row (which has none).

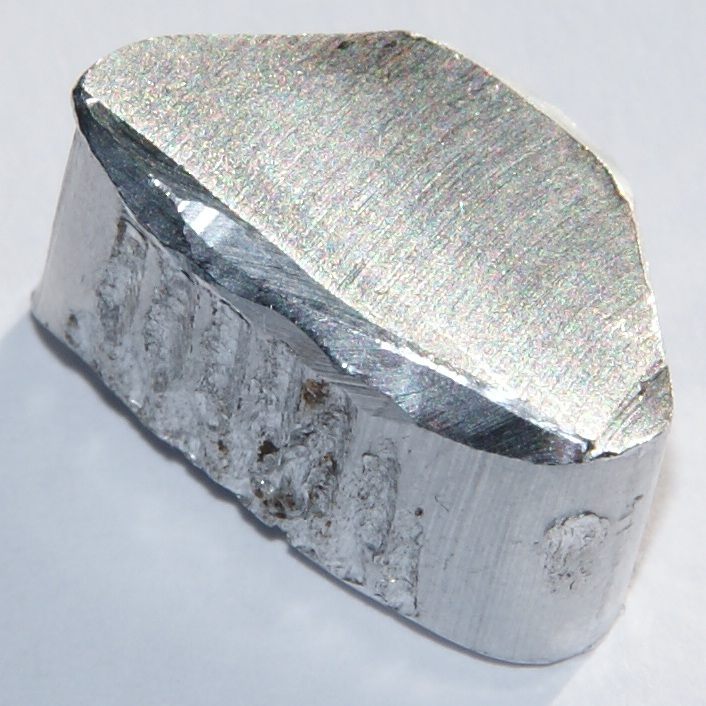
Aluminium (metal), Z = 13

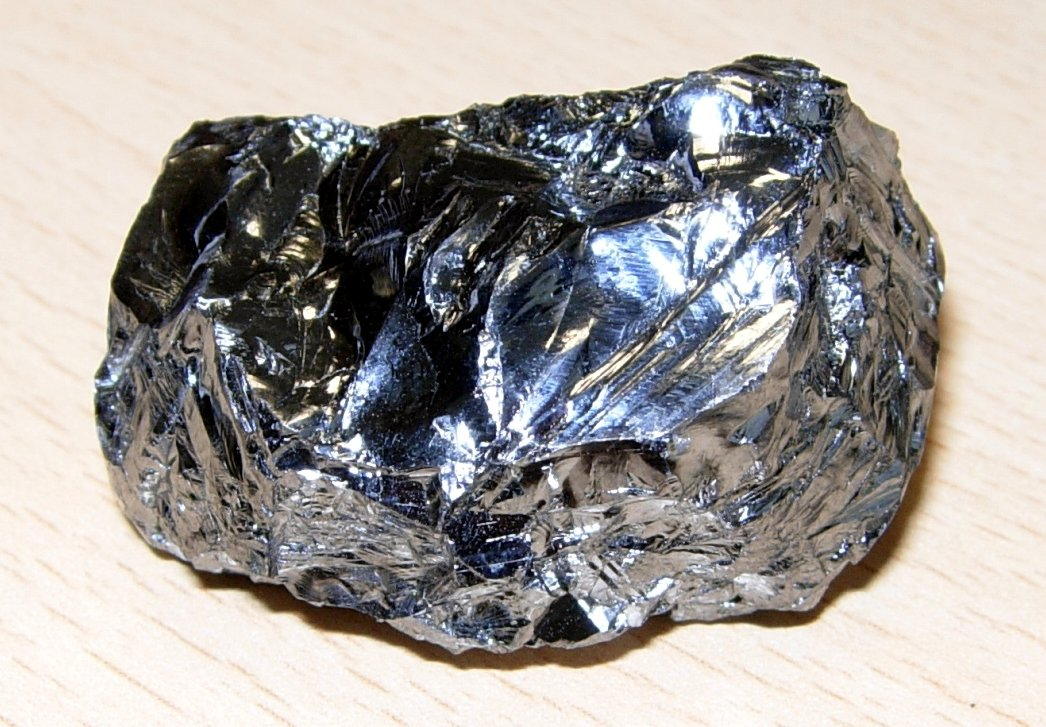
Silicon (metalloid), Z = 14

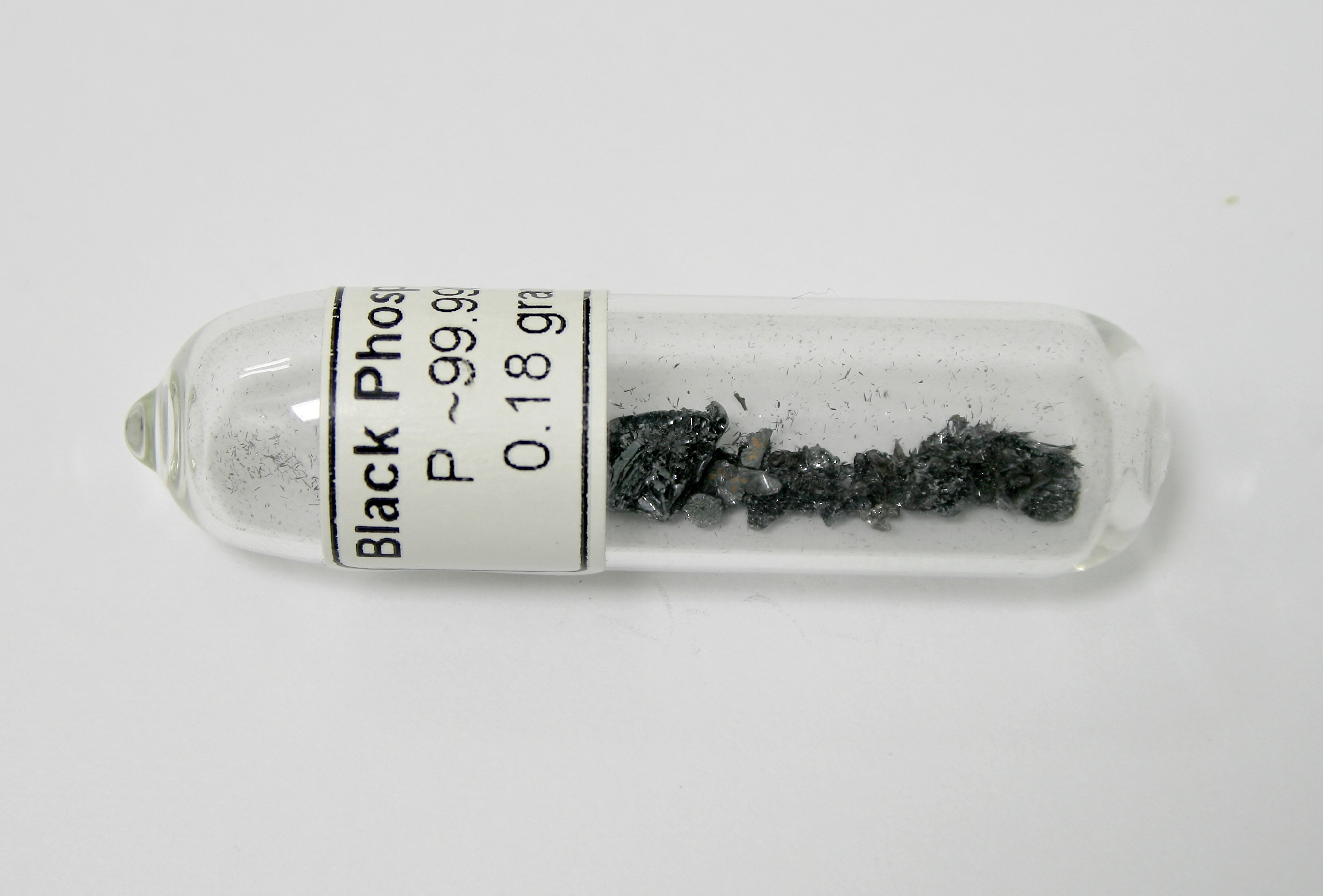
Phosphorus (nonmetal), Z = 15

This block is the only one having all three types of elements: metals, nonmetals, and metalloids. The p-block elements can be described on a group-by-group basis as: group 13, the triels; 14, the tetrels; 15, the pnictogens; 16, the chalcogens; 17, the halogens; and 18, the helium group, composed of the noble gases (excluding helium) and oganesson. Alternatively, the p-block can be described as containing post-transition metals; metalloids; reactive nonmetals including the halogens; and noble gases (excluding helium).

The p-block elements are unified by the fact that their valence (outermost) electrons are in the p orbital. The p orbital consists of six lobed shapes coming from a central point at evenly spaced angles. The p orbital can hold a maximum of six electrons, hence there are six columns in the p-block. Elements in column 13, the first column of the p-block, have one p-orbital electron. Elements in column 14, the second column of the p-block, have two p-orbital electrons. The trend continues this way until column 18, which has six p-orbital electrons.

The block is a stronghold of the octet rule in its first row, but elements in subsequent rows often display hypervalence. The p-block elements show variable oxidation states usually differing by multiples of two.

The bonding between metals and nonmetals depends on the electronegativity difference. Ionicity is possible when the electronegativity difference is high enough (e.g. Li_{3}N, NaCl, PbO). Metals in relatively high oxidation states tend to form covalent structures (e.g. WF_{6}, OsO_{4}, TiCl_{4}, AlCl_{3}), as do the more noble metals even in low oxidation states (e.g. AuCl, HgCl_{2}). There are also some metal oxides displaying electrical (metallic) conductivity, like RuO_{2}, ReO_{3}, and IrO_{2}. The metalloids tend to form either covalent compounds or alloys with metals, though even then ionicity is possible with the most electropositive metals (e.g. Mg_{2}Si).

=== d-block ===
The ... elements show a horizontal similarity in their physical and chemical properties as well as the usual vertical relationship. This horizontal similarity is so marked that the chemistry of the first ... series ... is often discussed separately from that of the second and third series, which are more similar to one another than to the first series.

— Kneen, W. R., Rogers, M. J. W., and Simpson, P. (1972)
Chemistry: Facts, patterns, and principles, Addison-Wesley, London, pp. 487−489

The d-block, with the d standing for "diffuse" and azimuthal quantum number 2, is in the middle of the periodic table and encompasses elements from groups 3 to 12; it starts in the 4th period. Periods from the fourth onwards have a space for ten d-block elements. Most or all of these elements are also known as transition metals because they occupy a transitional zone in properties, between the strongly electropositive metals of groups 1 and 2, and the weakly electropositive metals of groups 13 to 16. Group 3 or group 12, while still counted as d-block metals, are sometimes not counted as transition metals because they do not show the chemical properties characteristic of transition metals as much, for example, multiple oxidation states and coloured compounds.

The d-block elements are all metals and most have one or more chemically active d-orbital electrons. Because there is a relatively small difference in the energy of the different d-orbital electrons, the number of electrons participating in chemical bonding can vary. The d-block elements have a tendency to exhibit two or more oxidation states, differing by multiples of one. The most common oxidation states are +2 and +3. Chromium, iron, molybdenum, ruthenium, tungsten, and osmium can have formal oxidation numbers as low as −4; iridium holds the singular distinction of being capable of achieving an oxidation state of +9, though only under far-from-standard conditions.

The d-orbitals (four shaped as four-leaf clovers, and the fifth as a dumbbell with a ring around it) can contain up to five pairs of electrons.

Some sources list group 11 and group 12 elements with full d-orbitals separately as ds-block elements.

=== f-block ===
Because of their complex electronic structure, the significant electron correlation effects, and the large relativistic contributions, the f-block elements are probably the most challenging group of elements for electronic structure theory.

— Dolg, M., ed. (2015)
Computational method in lanthanide and actinide chemistry, John Wiley & Sons, Chichester, p. xvii

The f-block, with the f standing for "fundamental" and azimuthal quantum number 3, appears as a footnote in a standard 18-column table but is located at the center-left of a 32-column full-width table, between groups 2 and 3. Periods from the sixth onward have a place for fourteen f-block elements. These elements are generally not considered part of any group. They are sometimes called inner transition metals because they provide a transition between the s-block and d-block in the 6th and 7th row (period), in the same way that the d-block transition metals provide a transitional bridge between the s-block and p-block in the 4th and 5th rows.

The f-block elements come in two series: lanthanum through ytterbium in period 6, and actinium through nobelium in period 7. All are metals. The f-orbital electrons are less active in the chemistry of the period 6 f-block elements, although they do make some contribution; these are rather similar to each other. They are more active in the early period 7 f-block elements, where the energies of the 5f, 7s, and 6d shells are quite similar; consequently these elements tend to show as much chemical variability as their transition metals analogues. The later period 7 f-block elements from about curium onwards behave more like their period 6 counterparts.

The f-block elements are unified by mostly having one or more electrons in an inner f-orbital. Of the f-orbitals, six have six lobes each, and the seventh looks like a dumbbell with a donut with two rings. They can contain up to seven pairs of electrons; hence, the block occupies fourteen columns in the periodic table. They are not assigned group numbers, since vertical periodic trends cannot be discerned in a "group" of two elements.

The two 14-member rows of the f-block elements are sometimes confused with the lanthanides and the actinides, which are names for sets of elements based on chemical properties more so than electron configurations. Those sets have 15 elements rather than 14, extending into the first members of the d-block in their periods, lutetium and lawrencium respectively.

In many periodic tables, the f-block is shifted one element to the right, so that lanthanum and actinium become d-block elements, and Ce–Lu and Th–Lr form the f-block tearing the d-block into two very uneven portions. This is a holdover from early erroneous measurements of electron configurations, in which the 4f shell was thought to complete its filling only at lutetium. In fact ytterbium completes the 4f shell, and on this basis Lev Landau and Evgeny Lifshitz considered in 1948 that lutetium cannot correctly be considered an f-block element. Since then, physical, chemical, and electronic evidence has overwhelmingly supported that the f-block contains the elements La–Yb and Ac–No, as shown here and as supported by International Union of Pure and Applied Chemistry reports dating from 1988 and 2021.

=== g-block ===
A g-block, with azimuthal quantum number 4, is predicted to begin in the vicinity of element 121. Though g-orbitals are not expected to start filling in the ground state until around element 124–126, they are likely already low enough in energy to start participating chemically in element 121, similar to the 4f and 5f orbitals.

If the trend of the previous rows continued, then the g-block would have eighteen elements. However, calculations predict a very strong blurring of periodicity in the eighth period, to the point that individual blocks become hard to delineate. It is likely that the eighth period will not quite follow the trend of previous rows.

== See also ==
- Electron shell subshells
