= Zhejiang Institute of Modern Physics =

Zhejiang Institute of Modern Physics (Traditional Chinese: 浙江大學近代物理中心, Simplified Chinese: 浙江近代物理中心) is a research center for theoretical physics. It is part of the Zhejiang University, People's Republic of China.

== Introduction ==
The institute was formally founded in 1991, due to the encouragement of American Nobel Prize laureate Tsung-Dao Lee and current President of Chinese Academy of Sciences Lu Yongxiang, both of whom are Zhejiang University alumni. Tsung-Dao Lee was named the first Director of the institute. The prominent leader Chen Yun also wrote (in calligraphy) the name for the institute.

The facility is located on the hill of the Lingfeng (灵峰), and in the Yuquan Campus. It has a construction area of 1,000 m^{2}.

The Institute focuses on the study of quantum field theory, string theory, and high-energy physics. Current researchers including Mr. Xiaowei TANG (唐孝威, academician of CAS) also perform interdisciplinary studies of biophysics.

The institute is coupled closely with the Department of Physics of Zhejiang University.
