= Journal of Physics: Conference Series =

- Language: English

Publication details
- History: 2004-present
- Publisher: IOP Publishing (UK)
- Frequency: Upon acceptance
- Open access: Yes

Standard abbreviations
- ISO 4: J. Phys. Conf. Ser.

Indexing
- ISSN: 1742-6588 (print); 1742-6596 (web)

Links
- Journal homepage; Online access

Journal of Physics: Conference Series (JPCS) is a peer-reviewed, open-access publication from IOP Publishing providing readers with the latest developments in physics presented at international conferences.

It forms part of the IOP Conference Series, a collection of open access publications specialising in proceedings publication. Other titles in this series are IOP Conference Series: Materials Science and Engineering and IOP Conference Series: Earth and Environmental Science.

It is indexed in Inspec, Scopus, INSPIRE-HEP, MathSciNet, ISI Proceedings, Chemical Abstracts, NASA Astrophysics Data System, INIS (International Nuclear Information System), and VINITI Abstracts Journal (Referativnyi Zhurnal). The journal has secure long-term archiving policies via LOCKSS and Portico.

In February 2022, IOP Publishing retracted 232 articles from Journal of Physics: Conference Series, for reasons including plagiarism, lack of actual peer review, and citation manipulation. Later, in September of that year, they retracted another 494 articles for having apparently been produced by a paper mill.
