= Transfermium Wars =

Disputes between American and Soviet scientists over element naming

The names for the chemical elements 102 to 109 (most notably 104 to 106) were the subject of a major controversy starting in the 1960s and settled by IUPAC in 1997. It was described by some nuclear chemists as the Transfermium Wars because it concerned the elements following fermium (element 100) on the periodic table. This controversy arose from disputes between American scientists and Soviet scientists as to which had first isolated these elements.

== Background ==
By convention, naming rights for newly discovered chemical elements go to their discoverers. For elements 104, 105, and 106, there was a controversy between Soviet researchers at the Joint Institute for Nuclear Research and American researchers at Lawrence Berkeley National Laboratory regarding which group had discovered them first. Both parties suggested their own names for elements 104 and 105, not recognizing the other's name.

The American name of seaborgium for element 106 was also objectionable to some, because it referred to American chemist Glenn T. Seaborg who was still alive at the time this name was proposed. (Einsteinium and fermium had also been proposed as names of new elements while Albert Einstein and Enrico Fermi were still living, but only made public after their deaths, due to Cold War secrecy.)

== Controversy ==
=== Opponents ===
The two principal groups which were involved in the conflict over element naming were:

- An American group at Lawrence Berkeley Laboratory,
- A Russian group at Joint Institute for Nuclear Research in Dubna,

and, as a kind of arbiter,

- The IUPAC Commission on Nomenclature of Inorganic Chemistry, which introduced its own proposal to the IUPAC General Assembly.

The German group at the Gesellschaft für Schwerionenforschung (GSI) in Darmstadt, who had (undisputedly) discovered elements 107 to 109, were dragged into the controversy when the Commission suggested that the name "hahnium", proposed for element 105 by the Americans, be used for GSI's element 108 instead.

=== Proposals ===
==== American ====
| Atomic number | Name | Eponym |
|---|---|---|
| 104 | Rutherfordium | Ernest Rutherford |
| 105 | Hahnium | Otto Hahn |
| 106 | Seaborgium | Glenn T. Seaborg |

==== Russian ====
| Atomic number | Name | Eponym |
|---|---|---|
| 104 | Kurchatovium | Igor Kurchatov |
| 105 | Nielsbohrium | Niels Bohr |

==== German ====
The names suggested for the elements 107 to 109 by the German group were:

| Atomic number | Name | Eponym |
|---|---|---|
| 107 | Nielsbohrium | Niels Bohr |
| 108 | Hassium | Hesse, Germany |
| 109 | Meitnerium | Lise Meitner |

==== IUPAC ====
In 1994, the IUPAC Commission on Nomenclature of Inorganic Chemistry proposed the following names:

| Atomic number | Name | Eponym |
|---|---|---|
| 104 | Dubnium | Dubna, Russia |
| 105 | Joliotium | Frédéric Joliot-Curie |
| 106 | Rutherfordium | Ernest Rutherford |
| 107 | Bohrium | Niels Bohr |
| 108 | Hahnium | Otto Hahn |
| 109 | Meitnerium | Lise Meitner |

This attempted to resolve the dispute by sharing the namings of the disputed elements between Russians and Americans, replacing the name for 104 with one honoring the Dubna research center, and not naming 106 after Seaborg.

=== Objections to the IUPAC proposal ===
This solution drew objections from the American Chemical Society (ACS) on the grounds that the right of the American group to propose the name for element 106 was not in question, and that group should have the right to name the element. Indeed, IUPAC decided that the credit for the discovery of element 106 should be awarded to Berkeley.

Along the same lines, the German group protested against naming element 108 by the American suggestion "hahnium", mentioning the long-standing convention that an element is named by its discoverers.

In addition, given that many American books had already used rutherfordium and hahnium for 104 and 105, the ACS objected to those names being used for other elements.

In 1995, IUPAC abandoned the controversial rule and established a committee of national representatives aimed at finding a compromise. They suggested seaborgium for element 106 in exchange for the removal of all the other American proposals, except for the established name lawrencium for element 103. The equally entrenched name nobelium for element 102 was replaced by flerovium after Georgy Flyorov, following the recognition by the 1993 report that that element had been first synthesized in Dubna. This was rejected by American scientists and the decision was retracted. The name flerovium was later used for element 114.

== Resolution (IUPAC 97) ==
In 1996, IUPAC held another meeting, reconsidered all names in hand, and accepted another set of recommendations; finally, it was approved and published in 1997 on the 39th IUPAC General Assembly in Geneva, Switzerland. Element 105 was named dubnium (Db), after Dubna in Russia, the location of the JINR; the American suggestions were used for elements 102, 103, 104, and 106. The name dubnium had been used for element 104 in the previous IUPAC recommendation. The American scientists "reluctantly" approved this decision. IUPAC pointed out that the Berkeley Laboratory had already been recognized several times, in the naming of berkelium, californium, and americium, and that the acceptance of the names rutherfordium and seaborgium for elements 104 and 106 should be offset by recognizing JINR's contributions to the discovery of elements 104, 105, and 106.

The following names were agreed in 1997 on the 39th IUPAC General Assembly in Geneva, Switzerland:

| Atomic number | Name | Eponym |
|---|---|---|
| 104 | Rutherfordium | Ernest Rutherford |
| 105 | Dubnium | Dubna, Russia |
| 106 | Seaborgium | Glenn Theodore Seaborg |
| 107 | Bohrium | Niels Bohr |
| 108 | Hassium | Hesse, Germany |
| 109 | Meitnerium | Lise Meitner |

Thus, the convention of the discoverer's right to name their elements was respected for elements 106 to 109, and the two disputed claims were "shared" between the two opponents.

In some countries uninvolved in the dispute, such as Bulgaria, Poland, Denmark, India, and Indonesia, both kurchatovium for element 104 and hahnium for element 105 were used until 1997.

== Summary ==
Summary of element naming proposals and final decisions for elements 101–112 (those covered in the TWG report)
| Z | Mendeleev | Systematic | American | Russian | German | Compromise 92 | IUPAC 94 | ACS 94 | IUPAC 95 | IUPAC 97 | Present |
|---|---|---|---|---|---|---|---|---|---|---|---|
| 101 | eka-thulium | (unnilunium) | mendelevium | — | — | mendelevium | mendelevium | mendelevium | mendelevium | mendelevium | mendelevium |
| 102 | eka-ytterbium | (unnilbium) | nobelium | joliotium | — | joliotium | nobelium | nobelium | flerovium | nobelium | nobelium |
| 103 | eka-lutetium | (unniltrium) | lawrencium | rutherfordium | — | lawrencium | lawrencium | lawrencium | lawrencium | lawrencium | lawrencium |
| 104 | eka-hafnium | unnilquadium | rutherfordium | kurchatovium | — | meitnerium | dubnium | rutherfordium | dubnium | rutherfordium | rutherfordium |
| 105 | eka-tantalum | unnilpentium | hahnium | nielsbohrium | — | kurchatovium | joliotium | hahnium | joliotium | dubnium | dubnium |
| 106 | eka-tungsten | unnilhexium | seaborgium | — | — | rutherfordium | rutherfordium | seaborgium | seaborgium | seaborgium | seaborgium |
| 107 | eka-rhenium | unnilseptium | — | — | nielsbohrium | nielsbohrium | bohrium | nielsbohrium | nielsbohrium | bohrium | bohrium |
| 108 | eka-osmium | unniloctium | — | — | hassium | hassium | hahnium | hassium | hahnium | hassium | hassium |
| 109 | eka-iridium | unnilennium | — | — | meitnerium | hahnium | meitnerium | meitnerium | meitnerium | meitnerium | meitnerium |
| 110 | eka-platinum | ununnilium | hahnium | becquerelium | darmstadtium | — | — | — | — | — | darmstadtium |
| 111 | eka-gold | unununium | — | — | roentgenium | — | — | — | — | — | roentgenium |
| 112 | eka-mercury | ununbium | — | — | copernicium | — | — | — | — | — | copernicium |
proposal eventually accepted. name eventually used for a different element. Flerovium, IUPAC 1995 proposal for element 102, was adopted uncontroversially for element 114 (eka-lead).

== See also ==
- List of chemical element name etymologies
- List of chemical element naming controversies (includes Z = 23, 41, 70, 71, 74)
- Systematic element name
- Chemical nomenclature
