= Element name =

Element name may refer to:

- A data element name in a database
- A name of a chemical element (Chemical_element#Element_names)

== See also ==
- Systematic element name
- List of chemical elements
- List of chemical element name etymologies
