= List of chemical element naming controversies =

The currently accepted names and symbols of the chemical elements are determined by the International Union of Pure and Applied Chemistry (IUPAC), usually following recommendations by the recognized discoverers of each element. However, the names of several elements have been the subject of controversies until IUPAC established an official name. In most cases, the controversy was due to a priority dispute as to who first found conclusive evidence for the existence of an element, or as to what evidence was in fact conclusive.

== Element 23 (Vanadium V) ==
Vanadium (named after Vanadís, another name for Freyja, the Scandinavian goddess of fertility) was originally discovered by Andrés Manuel del Río (a Spanish-born Mexican mineralogist) in Mexico City in 1801. He discovered the element after being sent a sample of "brown lead" ore (plomo pardo de Zimapán, now named vanadinite). Through experimentation, he found it to form salts with a wide variety of colors, so he named the element panchromium (Greek: all colors). He later renamed this substance erythronium, since most of the salts turned red when heated. The French chemist Hippolyte Victor Collet-Descotils incorrectly declared that del Río's new element was only impure chromium. Del Río thought himself to be mistaken and accepted the statement of the French chemist that was also backed by del Río's friend Alexander von Humboldt.

In 1831, Sefström of Sweden rediscovered vanadium in a new oxide he found while working with some iron ores. He chose to call the element vanadin in Swedish (which has become vanadium in other languages including German and English) after the Old Norse Vanadís, another name for the Norse Vanr goddess Freyja, whose facets include connections to beauty and fertility, because of the many beautifully colored chemical compounds it produces. Later that same year, Friedrich Wöhler confirmed del Río's earlier work. Later, George William Featherstonhaugh, one of the first US geologists, suggested that the element should be named "rionium" after del Río, but this never happened.

== Element 41 (Niobium Nb) ==
Charles Hatchett named element 41 columbium in 1801 (Cb), but after the publication of On the Identity of Columbium and Tantalum by William Hyde Wollaston in 1809, the claims of discovery of Hatchett were mistakenly considered refuted. In 1846, Heinrich Rose discovered that tantalite contained an element similar to tantalum and named it niobium. In the 1860s, it was found that niobium and columbium are the same element and are distinct from tantalum.

IUPAC officially adopted niobium in 1949 after 100 years of controversy.

== Elements 70 (Ytterbium Yb) and 71 (Lutetium Lu) ==
Gadolinite, a mineral from Ytterby, a village in Sweden, consists of several compounds (oxides or earths): yttria, erbia (sub-component as ytterbia) and terbia.

In 1878, Jean Charles Galissard de Marignac assumed that ytterbia consisted of a new element he called ytterbium, but actually, there were two new elements. In 1907, Georges Urbain isolated oxides of element 70 and element 71 from ytterbia. He called element 70 neoytterbium ("new ytterbium") and called element 71 lutecium. At about the same time, Carl Auer von Welsbach also independently isolated these and proposed the names aldebaranium (Ad), after the star Aldebaran in the constellation of Taurus, for element 70 (ytterbium), and cassiopeium (Cp), after the constellation Cassiopeia, for element 71 (lutetium), but both proposals were rejected.

Neoytterbium (element 70) was eventually reverted to ytterbium (following Marignac), and in 1949, the spelling of lutecium (element 71) was changed to lutetium.

== Element 72 (Hafnium Hf) ==
In 1911, Georges Urbain announced discovery of a rare earth element following lutetium by atomic weight, which he called celtium. With discovery of Moseley's law, "celtium" came to be identified as element 72. However, Henry Moseley showed that Urbain's samples of "celtium" did not contain element 72, which therefore remained to be discovered, but in 1922, Alexandre Dauvillier noted faint X-ray spectral lines of element 72 in Urbain's samples. In December 1922 or January 1923, Dirk Coster and George de Hevesy discovered element 72 in zircon and showed that it resembles zirconium and differs from the rare earth elements. They considered Dauvillier's result to be dubious and named element 72 hafnium. Nevertheless, Urbain continued to consider himself the true discoverer of element 72, so the name "celtium" continued to be used in French chemical literature for hafnium. IUPAC finally confirmed the name "hafnium" in 1949.

== Element 74 (Tungsten W) ==
Element 74 has been known since the end of the 18th century under two names, tungsten and wolfram, after two minerals in which it was discovered. In 1949, IUPAC made wolfram the universal name. However, that decision received a lot of criticism and was given up in 1951, so both names continue to be used depending on the language.

== Elements 102–109 ==
At the time of their discovery, there was an element naming controversy as to what (particularly) the elements from 102 to 109 were to be called. At last, a committee of the International Union of Pure and Applied Chemistry (IUPAC) resolved the dispute and adopted one name for each element. They also adopted a temporary systematic element name.

=== Element 102 (Nobelium No) ===
IUPAC ratified the name nobelium (No) in honor of Alfred Nobel.

=== Element 103 (Lawrencium Lr) ===
IUPAC ratified the name lawrencium (Lr) in honor of Ernest Lawrence during a meeting in Geneva; the name was preferred by the American Chemical Society.

=== Element 104 (Rutherfordium Rf) ===
The Joint Institute for Nuclear Research in Dubna (then USSR, today Russia) named element 104 kurchatovium (Ku) in honor of Igor Kurchatov, father of the Soviet atomic bomb, while the University of California, Berkeley, US, named element 104 rutherfordium (Rf) in honor of Ernest Rutherford. In 1997, a committee of IUPAC recommended that element 104 be named rutherfordium.

=== Element 105 (Dubnium Db) ===
The Joint Institute for Nuclear Research in Dubna (a Russian city north of Moscow), proposed naming element 105 nielsbohrium (Ns) after Niels Bohr, while the University of California, Berkeley suggested the name hahnium (Ha) in honor of Otto Hahn. IUPAC recommended that element 105 be named dubnium, after Dubna.

=== Element 106 (Seaborgium Sg) ===
The element was discovered almost simultaneously by two laboratories. In June 1974, a Soviet team led by G. N. Flyorov at the Joint Institute for Nuclear Research at Dubna reported producing the isotope ^{259}_{106}Sg, and in September 1974, an American research team led by Albert Ghiorso at the Lawrence Radiation Laboratory at the University of California, Berkeley reported creating the isotope ^{263}_{106}Sg. Because their work was independently confirmed first, the Americans suggested the name seaborgium (Sg) in honor of Glenn T. Seaborg, an American chemist. This name was extremely controversial because Seaborg was still alive.

An international committee decided in 1992 that the Berkeley and Dubna laboratories should share credit for the discovery. An element naming controversy erupted and as a result IUPAC adopted unnilhexium (Unh) as a temporary systematic element name.

In 1994, a committee of IUPAC adopted a rule that no element can be named after a living person. This ruling was fiercely objected to by the American Chemical Society.

Seaborg and Ghiorso pointed out that precedents had been set in the naming of elements 99 and 100 as einsteinium (Es) and fermium (Fm) during the lives of Albert Einstein and Enrico Fermi, although these names were not publicly announced until after Einstein and Fermi's deaths. In 1997, as part of a compromise involving elements 104 to 108, the name seaborgium for element 106 was recognized internationally.

=== Element 107 (Bohrium Bh) ===
Some suggested the name nielsbohrium (Ns), in honor of Niels Bohr (this was separate from the proposal of the same name for element 105). IUPAC adopted unnilseptium (Uns) as a temporary systematic element name. In 1994, a committee of IUPAC recommended that element 107 be named bohrium (Bh), also in honor of Niels Bohr but using his surname only. While this conforms to the names of other elements honoring individuals where only the surname is taken, it was opposed by many who were concerned that it could be confused with boron, which is called borium in some languages including Latin. Despite this, the name bohrium for element 107 was recognized internationally in 1997.

=== Element 108 (Hassium Hs) ===
IUPAC adopted unniloctium (Uno) as a temporary systematic element name. In 1997, a committee of IUPAC recommended that element 108 be named hassium (Hs), in honor of the German state of Hesse (or Hassia in Latin). This state includes the city of Darmstadt, which is home to the GSI Helmholtz Centre for Heavy Ion Research where several new elements were discovered or confirmed. The element name was accepted internationally.

=== Element 109 (Meitnerium Mt) ===
IUPAC adopted unnilennium (Une) as a temporary systematic element name. While meitnerium was discussed in the naming controversy, it was the only proposal and thus never disputed. In 1997, a committee of IUPAC adopted the name meitnerium in honor of Lise Meitner (Mt).

=== Elements 101–112 ===
Summary of element naming proposals and final decisions for elements 101–112 (those covered in the TWG report)
Z	Mendeleev	Systematic	American	Russian	German	Compromise 92	IUPAC 94	ACS 94	IUPAC 95	IUPAC 97	Present
101	eka-thulium	(unnilunium)	mendelevium	—	—	mendelevium	mendelevium	mendelevium	mendelevium	mendelevium	mendelevium
102	eka-ytterbium	(unnilbium)	nobelium	joliotium	—	joliotium	nobelium	nobelium	flerovium	nobelium	nobelium
103	eka-lutetium	(unniltrium)	lawrencium	rutherfordium	—	lawrencium	lawrencium	lawrencium	lawrencium	lawrencium	lawrencium
104	eka-hafnium	unnilquadium	rutherfordium	kurchatovium	—	meitnerium	dubnium	rutherfordium	dubnium	rutherfordium	rutherfordium
105	eka-tantalum	unnilpentium	hahnium	nielsbohrium	—	kurchatovium	joliotium	hahnium	joliotium	dubnium	dubnium
106	eka-tungsten	unnilhexium	seaborgium	—	—	rutherfordium	rutherfordium	seaborgium	seaborgium	seaborgium	seaborgium
107	eka-rhenium	unnilseptium	—	—	nielsbohrium	nielsbohrium	bohrium	nielsbohrium	nielsbohrium	bohrium	bohrium
108	eka-osmium	unniloctium	—	—	hassium	hassium	hahnium	hassium	hahnium	hassium	hassium
109	eka-iridium	unnilennium	—	—	meitnerium	hahnium	meitnerium	meitnerium	meitnerium	meitnerium	meitnerium
110	eka-platinum	ununnilium	hahnium	becquerelium	darmstadtium	—	—	—	—	—	darmstadtium
111	eka-gold	unununium	—	—	roentgenium	—	—	—	—	—	roentgenium
112	eka-mercury	ununbium	—	—	copernicium	—	—	—	—	—	copernicium
proposal eventually accepted. name eventually used for a different element. Flerovium, IUPAC 1995 proposal for element 102, was adopted uncontroversially for element 114 (eka-lead).

== See also ==
- List of chemical element name etymologies
- Seaborgium § History
- Symbol (chemistry) § Symbols and names not currently used
- IUPAC/IUPAP Joint Working Party (considers claims for discovery and naming of new elements)
