= Isotopes of bohrium =

Isotopes of bohrium (_{107}Bh)
Main isotopes			Decay	
Isotope	abundance	half-life (t_{1/2})	mode	product
^{267}Bh	synth	17 s	α	^{263}Db
^{270}Bh	synth	2.4 min	α	^{266}Db
^{271}Bh	synth	2.9 s	α	^{267}Db
^{272}Bh	synth	8.8 s	α	^{268}Db
^{274}Bh	synth	57 s	α	^{270}Db
^{278}Bh	synth	11.5 min?	SF	–

Bohrium (_{107}Bh) is an artificial element. Like all artificial elements, it has no stable isotopes, and a standard atomic weight cannot be given. The first isotope to be synthesized was ^{262}Bh in 1981. There are 11 known isotopes ranging from ^{260}Bh to ^{274}Bh, and 1 isomer, ^{262m}Bh. The longest-lived isotope is ^{270}Bh with a half-life of 2.4 minutes, although the unconfirmed ^{278}Bh may have an even longer half-life of about 11.5 minutes.

== List of isotopes ==
Nuclide (Note: ^{m}Bh – Excited nuclear isomer.)	Z	N	Isotopic mass (Da) (Note: ( ) – Uncertainty (1σ) is given in concise form in parentheses after the corresponding last digits.) (Note: # – Atomic mass marked #: value and uncertainty derived not from purely experimental data, but at least partly from trends from the Mass Surface (TMS).)	Discovery year	Half-life	Decay mode (Note: Modes of decay: SF: / Spontaneous fission)	Daughter isotope	Spin and parity (Note: ( ) spin value – Indicates spin with weak assignment arguments.)
Nuclide	Excitation energy			Discovery year	Half-life	Decay mode	Daughter isotope	Spin and parity
^{260}Bh	107	153	260.12144(21)#	2008	35+19 −9 ms [41(14) ms]	α	^{256}Db	
^{261}Bh	107	154	261.12140(19)	1989	11.8+3.9 −2.4 ms [12.8(3.2) ms]	α	^{257}Db	(5/2−)
^{261}Bh	107	154	261.12140(19)	1989	11.8+3.9 −2.4 ms [12.8(3.2) ms]	SF (rare)	(various)	(5/2−)
^{262}Bh	107	155	262.12265(10)	1981	84(11) ms	α (>80%)	^{258}Db	
^{262}Bh	107	155	262.12265(10)	1981	84(11) ms	SF (<20%)	(various)	
^{262m}Bh	220(50) keV			1981	9.5(1.6) ms	α	^{258}Db	
^{264}Bh	107	157	264.12449(19)#	1995	1.07(21) s	α (86%)	^{260}Db	
^{264}Bh	107	157	264.12449(19)#	1995	1.07(21) s	SF (14%)	(various)	
^{265}Bh	107	158	265.12496(26)#	2004	0.94+0.70 −0.31 s [1.19(52) s]	α	^{261}Db	
^{266}Bh	107	159	266.12679(18)#	2000	10.0+2.6 −1.7 s	α	^{262}Db	
^{266}Bh	107	159	266.12679(18)#	2000	10.0+2.6 −1.7 s	β^{+}?	^{266}Sg	
^{267}Bh	107	160	267.12750(28)#	2000	17+14 −6 s [22(10) s]	α	^{263}Db	
^{270}Bh (Note: Not directly synthesized, occurs in decay chain of ^{282}Nh)	107	163	270.13337(32)#	2007	2.4+4.4 −0.9 min	α	^{266}Db	
^{271}Bh (Note: Not directly synthesized, occurs in decay chain of ^{287}Mc)	107	164	271.13512(41)#	2013	2.9+2.2 −0.9 s	α	^{267}Db	
^{272}Bh (Note: Not directly synthesized, occurs in decay chain of ^{288}Mc)	107	165	272.13826(57)#	2004	8.8(7) s	α	^{268}Db	
^{274}Bh (Note: Not directly synthesized, occurs in decay chain of ^{294}Ts)	107	167	274.14360(62)#	2010	44+34 −13 s [57(27) s]	α	^{270}Db	
^{278}Bh (Note: Not directly synthesized, occurs in decay chain of ^{290}Fl and ^{294}Lv; unconfirmed)	107	171	278.15499(43)#	(2016)	11.5+55.0 −5.2 min?	SF	(various)	
This table header & footer:

== Nucleosynthesis ==
Superheavy elements such as bohrium are produced by bombarding lighter elements in particle accelerators that induce fusion reactions. Whereas most of the isotopes of bohrium can be synthesized directly this way, some heavier ones have only been observed as decay products of elements with higher atomic numbers.

Depending on the energies involved, the former are separated into "hot" and "cold". In hot fusion reactions, very light, high-energy projectiles are accelerated toward very heavy targets (actinides), giving rise to compound nuclei at high excitation energy (~40–50−MeV) that may either fission or evaporate several (3 to 5) neutrons. In cold fusion reactions, the produced fused nuclei have a relatively low excitation energy (~10–20 MeV), which decreases the probability that these products will undergo fission. As the fused nuclei cool to the ground state, they require emission of only one or two neutrons, thus allowing for the generation of more neutron-rich products. The latter is a distinct concept from that of where nuclear fusion claimed to be achieved at room temperature conditions (see cold fusion).

The table below contains various combinations of targets and projectiles which could be used to form compound nuclei with Z = 107.

Target	Projectile	CN	Attempt result
^{208}Pb	^{55}Mn	^{263}Bh	Successful reaction
^{209}Bi	^{54}Cr	^{263}Bh	Successful reaction
^{209}Bi	^{52}Cr	^{261}Bh	Successful reaction
^{238}U	^{31}P	^{269}Bh	Successful reaction
^{243}Am	^{26}Mg	^{269}Bh	Successful reaction
^{248}Cm	^{23}Na	^{271}Bh	Successful reaction
^{249}Bk	^{22}Ne	^{271}Bh	Successful reaction

=== Cold fusion ===
Before the first successful synthesis of hassium in 1981 by the GSI team, the synthesis of bohrium was first attempted in 1976 by scientists at the Joint Institute for Nuclear Research at Dubna using this cold fusion reaction. They detected two spontaneous fission activities, one with a half-life of 1–2 ms and one with a half-life of 5 s. Based on the results of other cold fusion reactions, they concluded that they were due to ^{261}Bh and ^{257}Db respectively. However, later evidence gave a much lower SF branching for ^{261}Bh reducing confidence in this assignment. The assignment of the dubnium activity was later changed to ^{258}Db, presuming that the decay of bohrium was missed. The 2 ms SF activity was assigned to ^{258}Rf resulting from the 33% EC branch. The GSI team studied the reaction in 1981 in their discovery experiments. Five atoms of ^{262}Bh were detected using the method of correlation of genetic parent-daughter decays. In 1987, an internal report from Dubna indicated that the team had been able to detect the spontaneous fission of ^{261}Bh directly. The GSI team further studied the reaction in 1989 and discovered the new isotope ^{261}Bh during the measurement of the 1n and 2n excitation functions but were unable to detect an SF branching for ^{261}Bh. They continued their study in 2003 using newly developed bismuth(III) fluoride (BiF_{3}) targets, used to provide further data on the decay data for ^{262}Bh and the daughter ^{258}Db. The 1n excitation function was remeasured in 2005 by the team at the Lawrence Berkeley National Laboratory (LBNL) after some doubt about the accuracy of previous data. They observed 18 atoms of ^{262}Bh and 3 atoms of ^{261}Bh and confirmed the two isomers of ^{262}Bh.

In 2007, the team at LBNL studied the analogous reaction with chromium-52 projectiles for the first time to search for the lightest bohrium isotope ^{260}Bh:

^{209}_{83}Bi + ^{52}_{24}Cr → ^{260}_{107}Bh + n

The team successfully detected 8 atoms of ^{260}Bh decaying by alpha decay to ^{256}Db, emitting alpha particles with energy 10.16 MeV. The alpha decay energy indicates the continued stabilizing effect of the N=152 closed shell.

The team at Dubna also studied the reaction between lead-208 targets and manganese-55 projectiles in 1976 as part of their newly established cold fusion approach to new elements:

^{208}_{82}Pb + ^{55}_{25}Mn → ^{262}_{107}Bh + n

They observed the same spontaneous fission activities as those observed in the reaction between bismuth-209 and chromium-54 and again assigned them to ^{261}Bh and ^{257}Db. Later evidence indicated that these should be reassigned to ^{258}Db and ^{258}Rf (see above). In 1983, they repeated the experiment using a new technique: measurement of alpha decay from a decay product that had been separated out chemically. The team were able to detect the alpha decay from a decay product of ^{262}Bh, providing some evidence for the formation of bohrium nuclei. This reaction was later studied in detail using modern techniques by the team at LBNL. In 2005 they measured 33 decays of ^{262}Bh and 2 atoms of ^{261}Bh, providing an excitation function for the reaction emitting one neutron and some spectroscopic data of both ^{262}Bh isomers. The excitation function for the reaction emitting two neutrons was further studied in a 2006 repeat of the reaction. The team found that the reaction emitting one neutron had a higher cross section than the corresponding reaction with a ^{209}Bi target, contrary to expectations. Further research is required to understand the reasons.

=== Hot fusion ===
The reaction between uranium-238 targets and phosphorus-31 projectiles was first studied in 2006 at the LBNL as part of their systematic study of fusion reactions using uranium-238 targets:

^{238}_{92}U + ^{31}_{15}P → ^{264}_{107}Bh + 5 n

Results have not been published but preliminary results appear to indicate the observation of spontaneous fission, possibly from ^{264}Bh.

In 2004, the team at the Institute of Modern Physics (IMP), Lanzhou, have studied the nuclear reaction between americium-243 targets and accelerated nuclei of magnesium-26 in order to synthesise the new isotope ^{265}Bh and gather more data on ^{266}Bh:

^{243}_{95}Am + ^{26}_{12}Mg → ^{269−x}_{107}Bh + x n (x = 3, 4, or 5)

In two series of experiments, the team measured partial excitation functions for the reactions emitting three, four, and five neutrons.

The reaction between targets of curium-248 and accelerated nuclei of sodium-23 was studied for the first time in 2008 by the team at RIKEN, Japan, in order to study the decay properties of ^{266}Bh, which is a decay product in their claimed decay chains of nihonium:

^{248}_{96}Cm + ^{23}_{11}Na → ^{271−x}_{107}Bh + x n (x = 4 or 5)

The decay of ^{266}Bh by the emission of alpha particles with energies of 9.05–9.23 MeV was further confirmed in 2010.

The first attempts to synthesize bohrium by hot fusion pathways were performed in 1979 by the team at Dubna, using the reaction between accelerated nuclei of neon-22 and targets of berkelium-249:

^{249}_{97}Bk + ^{22}_{10}Ne → ^{271−x}_{107}Bh + x n (x = 4 or 5)

The reaction was repeated in 1983. In both cases, they were unable to detect any spontaneous fission from nuclei of bohrium. More recently, hot fusions pathways to bohrium have been re-investigated in order to allow for the synthesis of more long-lived, neutron rich isotopes to allow a first chemical study of bohrium. In 1999, the team at LBNL claimed the discovery of long-lived ^{267}Bh (5 atoms) and ^{266}Bh (1 atom). Later, both of these were confirmed. The team at the Paul Scherrer Institute (PSI) in Bern, Switzerland later synthesized 6 atoms of ^{267}Bh in the first definitive study of the chemistry of bohrium.

=== As decay products ===
List of bohrium isotopes observed by decay
Evaporation residue	Observed bohrium isotope
^{294}Lv, ^{290}Fl, ^{290}Nh, ^{286}Rg, ^{282}Mt ?	^{278}Bh ?
^{294}Ts, ^{290}Mc, ^{286}Nh, ^{282}Rg, ^{278}Mt	^{274}Bh
^{288}Mc, ^{284}Nh, ^{280}Rg, ^{276}Mt	^{272}Bh
^{287}Mc, ^{283}Nh, ^{279}Rg, ^{275}Mt	^{271}Bh
^{286}Mc, ^{282}Nh, ^{278}Rg, ^{274}Mt	^{270}Bh
^{278}Nh, ^{274}Rg, ^{270}Mt	^{266}Bh
^{272}Rg, ^{268}Mt	^{264}Bh
^{266}Mt	^{262}Bh

Bohrium has been detected in the decay chains of elements with a higher atomic number, such as meitnerium. Meitnerium currently has seven isotopes that are known to undergo alpha decays to become bohrium nuclei, with mass numbers between 262 and 274. Parent meitnerium nuclei can be themselves decay products of roentgenium, nihonium, flerovium, moscovium, livermorium, or tennessine. For example, in January 2010, the Dubna team (JINR) identified bohrium-274 as a product in the decay of tennessine via an alpha decay sequence:

^{294}_{117}Ts → ^{290}_{115}Mc + ^{4}_{2}He
^{290}_{115}Mc → ^{286}_{113}Nh + ^{4}_{2}He
^{286}_{113}Nh → ^{282}_{111}Rg + ^{4}_{2}He
^{282}_{111}Rg → ^{278}_{109}Mt + ^{4}_{2}He
^{278}_{109}Mt → ^{274}_{107}Bh + ^{4}_{2}He

== Nuclear isomerism ==
^{262}Bh

The only confirmed example of isomerism in bohrium is in the isotope ^{262}Bh. Direct synthesis of ^{262}Bh results in two states, a ground state and an isomeric state. The ground state is confirmed to decay by alpha decay, emitting alpha particles with energies of 10.08, 9.82, and 9.76 MeV, and has a revised half-life of 84 ms. The excited state also decays by alpha decay, emitting alpha particles with energies of 10.37 and 10.24 MeV, and has a revised half-life of 9.6 ms.

== Chemical yields of isotopes ==
=== Cold fusion ===
The table below provides cross-sections and excitation energies for cold fusion reactions producing bohrium isotopes directly. Data in bold represents maxima derived from excitation function measurements. + represents an observed exit channel.

Projectile	Target	CN	1n	2n	3n
^{55}Mn	^{208}Pb	^{263}Bh	**590 pb, 14.1 MeV**	**~35 pb**	
^{54}Cr	^{209}Bi	^{263}Bh	**510 pb, 15.8 MeV**	**~50 pb**	
^{52}Cr	^{209}Bi	^{261}Bh	59 pb, 15.0 MeV		

=== Hot fusion ===
The table below provides cross-sections and excitation energies for hot fusion reactions producing bohrium isotopes directly. Data in bold represents maxima derived from excitation function measurements. + represents an observed exit channel.

Projectile	Target	CN	3n	4n	5n
^{26}Mg	^{243}Am	^{271}Bh	+	+	+
^{22}Ne	^{249}Bk	^{271}Bh		~96 pb	+
