= Meitnerium =

Meitnerium, _{109}Mt
Meitnerium
- Pronunciation: /maɪtˈnɪəriəm/ (myte-NEER-ee-əm); /ˈmaɪtnəriəm/ (MYTE-nər-ee-əm)
- Mass number: [278] (data not decisive) (Note: The most stable isotope of meitnerium cannot be determined based on existing data due to uncertainty that arises from the low number of measurements. The half-life of ^{278}Mt corresponding to two standard deviations is, based on existing data, 4.5+7.0 −2.6 seconds, whereas that of ^{274}Mt is 0.64+1.52 −0.46 seconds; these measurements have overlapping confidence intervals. It is also possible that the unconfirmed ^{282}Mt is more stable than both of these, with its half-life being 67 seconds.)

Meitnerium in the periodic table
Hydrogen																															Helium
Lithium	Beryllium																									Boron	Carbon	Nitrogen	Oxygen	Fluorine	Neon
Sodium	Magnesium																									Aluminium	Silicon	Phosphorus	Sulfur	Chlorine	Argon
Potassium	Calcium															Scandium	Titanium	Vanadium	Chromium	Manganese	Iron	Cobalt	Nickel	Copper	Zinc	Gallium	Germanium	Arsenic	Selenium	Bromine	Krypton
Rubidium	Strontium															Yttrium	Zirconium	Niobium	Molybdenum	Technetium	Ruthenium	Rhodium	Palladium	Silver	Cadmium	Indium	Tin	Antimony	Tellurium	Iodine	Xenon
Caesium	Barium	Lanthanum	Cerium	Praseodymium	Neodymium	Promethium	Samarium	Europium	Gadolinium	Terbium	Dysprosium	Holmium	Erbium	Thulium	Ytterbium	Lutetium	Hafnium	Tantalum	Tungsten	Rhenium	Osmium	Iridium	Platinum	Gold	Mercury (element)	Thallium	Lead	Bismuth	Polonium	Astatine	Radon
Francium	Radium	Actinium	Thorium	Protactinium	Uranium	Neptunium	Plutonium	Americium	Curium	Berkelium	Californium	Einsteinium	Fermium	Mendelevium	Nobelium	Lawrencium	Rutherfordium	Dubnium	Seaborgium	Bohrium	Hassium	Meitnerium	Darmstadtium	Roentgenium	Copernicium	Nihonium	Flerovium	Moscovium	Livermorium	Tennessine	Oganesson
Ir
↑
Mt
↓
—
hassium ← meitnerium → darmstadtium
- Atomic number (Z): 109
- Group: group 9
- Period: period 7
- Block: d-block
- Electron configuration: [Rn] 5f^{14} 6d^{7} 7s^{2} (predicted)
- Electrons per shell: 2, 8, 18, 32, 32, 15, 2 (predicted)

Physical properties
- Phase at STP: solid (predicted)
- Density (near r.t.): 27–28 g/cm^{3} (predicted)

Atomic properties
- Oxidation states: common: (none) (+1), (+3), (+6)
- Ionization energies: 1st: 800 kJ/mol; 2nd: 1820 kJ/mol; 3rd: 2900 kJ/mol; (more) (all estimated)
- Atomic radius: empirical: 128 pm (predicted)
- Covalent radius: 129 pm (estimated)

Other properties
- Natural occurrence: synthetic
- Crystal structure: face-centered cubic (fcc) (predicted)
- Magnetic ordering: paramagnetic (predicted)
- CAS Number: 54038-01-6

History
- Naming: after Lise Meitner
- Discovery: Gesellschaft für Schwerionenforschung (1982)

Isotopes of meitnerium
Main isotopes			Decay	
Isotope	abundance	half-life (t_{1/2})	mode	product
^{274}Mt	synth	0.64 s	α	^{270}Bh
^{276}Mt	synth	0.62 s	α	^{272}Bh
^{278}Mt	synth	4.5 s	α	^{274}Bh
^{282}Mt	synth	67 s?	α	^{278}Bh

Meitnerium is a synthetic chemical element; it has symbol Mt and atomic number 109. It is an extremely radioactive synthetic element (not naturally occurring, but can be created in a laboratory). The most stable known isotope, meitnerium-278, has a half-life of 4.5 seconds, although the unconfirmed meitnerium-282 may have a longer half-life of 67 seconds. The element was first synthesized in August 1982 by the GSI Helmholtz Centre for Heavy Ion Research near Darmstadt, Germany, and it was named after the Austrian-Swedish nuclear physicist Lise Meitner in 1997.

In the periodic table, meitnerium is a d-block transactinide element. It is a member of the 7th period and is placed in the group 9 elements, although no chemical experiments have yet been carried out to confirm that it behaves as the heavier homologue to iridium in group 9 as the seventh member of the 6d series of transition metals. Meitnerium is calculated to have properties similar to its lighter homologues, cobalt, rhodium, and iridium.

== Introduction ==
=== Synthesis of superheavy nuclei ===
A graphic depiction of a nuclear fusion reaction. Two nuclei fuse into one, emitting a neutron. Reactions that created new elements to this moment were similar, though varying numbers of neutrons – or alternatively charged particles – may be emitted instead.

A superheavy (Note: In nuclear physics, an element is called heavy if its atomic number is high; lead (element 82) is one example of such a heavy element. The term "superheavy elements" typically refers to elements with atomic number greater than 103 (although there are other definitions, such as atomic number greater than 100 or 112; sometimes, the term is presented an equivalent to the term "transactinide", which puts an upper limit before the beginning of the hypothetical superactinide series). Terms "heavy isotopes" (of a given element) and "heavy nuclei" mean what could be understood in the common language—isotopes of high mass (for the given element) and nuclei of high mass, respectively.) atomic nucleus is created in a nuclear reaction that combines two other nuclei of unequal size (Note: In 2009, a team at the JINR led by Oganessian published results of their attempt to create hassium in a symmetric ^{136}Xe + ^{136}Xe reaction. They failed to observe a single atom in such a reaction, putting the upper limit on the cross section, the measure of probability of a nuclear reaction, as 2.5 pb. In comparison, the reaction that resulted in hassium discovery, ^{208}Pb + ^{58}Fe, had a cross section of ~20 pb (more specifically, 19^{+19}_{-11} pb), as estimated by the discoverers.) into one; roughly, the more unequal the two nuclei in terms of mass, the greater the possibility that the two react. The material made of the heavier nuclei is made into a target, which is then bombarded by the beam of lighter nuclei. Two nuclei can only fuse into one if they are close enough to each other; normally, nuclei (all positively charged) repel each other due to electrostatic repulsion. The strong interaction can overcome this repulsion but only within a very short distance from a nucleus; beam nuclei are thus greatly accelerated in order to make such repulsion insignificant compared to the velocity of the beam nucleus. The energy applied to the beam nuclei to accelerate them can cause them to reach speeds as high as one-tenth of the speed of light. However, if too much energy is applied, the beam nucleus can fall apart.

Coming close enough alone is not enough for two nuclei to fuse: when two nuclei approach each other, they usually remain together for about 10^{−20} seconds and then part ways (not necessarily in the same composition as before the reaction) rather than form a single nucleus. This happens because during the attempted formation of a single nucleus, electrostatic repulsion tears apart the nucleus that is being formed. Each pair of a target and a beam is characterized by its cross section—the probability that fusion will occur if two nuclei approach one another expressed in terms of the transverse area that the incident particle must hit in order for the fusion to occur. (Note: The amount of energy applied to the beam particle to accelerate it can also influence the value of cross section. For example, in the ^{28}_{14}Si + ^{1}_{0}n → ^{28}_{13}Al + ^{1}_{1}p reaction, cross section changes smoothly from 370 mb at 12.3 MeV to 160 mb at 18.3 MeV, with a broad peak at 13.5 MeV with the maximum value of 380 mb.) This fusion may occur as a result of the quantum effect in which nuclei can tunnel through electrostatic repulsion. If the two nuclei can stay close past that phase, multiple nuclear interactions result in redistribution of energy and an energy equilibrium.

External videos
- Visualization of unsuccessful nuclear fusion, based on calculations from the Australian National University

The resulting merger is an excited state—termed a compound nucleus—and thus it is very unstable. To reach a more stable state, the temporary merger may fission without formation of a more stable nucleus. Alternatively, the compound nucleus may eject a few neutrons, which would carry away the excitation energy; if the latter is not sufficient for a neutron expulsion, the merger would produce a gamma ray. This happens in about 10^{−16} seconds after the initial nuclear collision and results in creation of a more stable nucleus. The definition by the IUPAC/IUPAP Joint Working Party (JWP) states that a chemical element can only be recognized as discovered if a nucleus of it exists for at least 10^{−14} seconds. This value was chosen as an estimate of how long it takes a nucleus to acquire electrons and thus display its chemical properties. (Note: This figure also marks the generally accepted upper limit for lifetime of a compound nucleus.)

=== Decay and detection ===
The beam passes through the target and reaches the next chamber, the separator; if a new nucleus is produced, it is carried with this beam. In the separator, the newly produced nucleus is separated from other nuclides (that of the original beam and any other reaction products) (Note: This separation is based on that the resulting nuclei move past the target more slowly then the unreacted beam nuclei. The separator contains electric and magnetic fields whose effects on a moving particle cancel out for a specific velocity of a particle. Such separation can also be aided by a time-of-flight measurement and a recoil energy measurement; a combination of the two may allow to estimate the mass of a nucleus.) and transferred to a surface-barrier detector, which stops the nucleus. The exact location of the upcoming impact on the detector is marked; also marked are its energy and the time of the arrival. The transfer takes about 10^{−6} seconds; in order to be detected, the nucleus must survive this long. The nucleus is recorded again once its decay is registered, and the location, the energy, and the time of the decay are measured.

Stability of a nucleus is provided by the strong interaction. However, its range is very short; as nuclei become larger, its influence on the outermost nucleons (protons and neutrons) weakens. At the same time, the nucleus is torn apart by electrostatic repulsion between protons, and its range is not limited. Total binding energy provided by the strong interaction increases linearly with the number of nucleons, whereas electrostatic repulsion increases with the square of the atomic number, i.e. the latter grows faster and becomes increasingly important for heavy and superheavy nuclei. Superheavy nuclei are thus theoretically predicted and have so far been observed to predominantly decay via decay modes that are caused by such repulsion: alpha decay and spontaneous fission. (Note: Not all decay modes are caused by electrostatic repulsion. For example, beta decay is caused by the weak interaction.) Almost all alpha emitters have over 210 nucleons, and the lightest nuclide primarily undergoing spontaneous fission has 238. In both decay modes, nuclei are inhibited from decaying by corresponding energy barriers for each mode, but they can be tunneled through.

Scheme of an apparatus for creation of superheavy elements, based on the Dubna Gas-Filled Recoil Separator set up in the Flerov Laboratory of Nuclear Reactions in JINR. The trajectory within the detector and the beam focusing apparatus changes because of a dipole magnet in the former and quadrupole magnets in the latter.

Alpha particles are commonly produced in radioactive decays because the mass of an alpha particle per nucleon is small enough to leave some energy for the alpha particle to be used as kinetic energy to leave the nucleus. Spontaneous fission is caused by electrostatic repulsion tearing the nucleus apart and produces various nuclei in different instances of identical nuclei fissioning. As the atomic number increases, spontaneous fission rapidly becomes more important: spontaneous fission partial half-lives decrease by 23 orders of magnitude from uranium (element 92) to nobelium (element 102), and by 30 orders of magnitude from thorium (element 90) to fermium (element 100). The earlier liquid drop model thus suggested that spontaneous fission would occur nearly instantly due to disappearance of the fission barrier for nuclei with about 280 nucleons. The later nuclear shell model suggested that nuclei with about 300 nucleons would form an island of stability in which nuclei will be more resistant to spontaneous fission and will primarily undergo alpha decay with longer half-lives. Subsequent discoveries suggested that the predicted island might be further than originally anticipated; they also showed that nuclei intermediate between the long-lived actinides and the predicted island are deformed, and gain additional stability from shell effects. Experiments on lighter superheavy nuclei, as well as those closer to the expected island, have shown greater than previously anticipated stability against spontaneous fission, showing the importance of shell effects on nuclei. (Note: It was already known by the 1960s that ground states of nuclei differed in energy and shape as well as that certain magic numbers of nucleons corresponded to greater stability of a nucleus. However, it was assumed that there was no nuclear structure in superheavy nuclei as they were too deformed to form one.)

Alpha decays are registered by the emitted alpha particles, and the decay products are easy to determine before the actual decay; if such a decay or a series of consecutive decays produces a known nucleus, the original product of a reaction can be easily determined. (Note: Since mass of a nucleus is not measured directly but is rather calculated from that of another nucleus, such measurement is called indirect. Direct measurements are also possible, but for the most part they have remained unavailable for superheavy nuclei. The first direct measurement of mass of a superheavy nucleus was reported in 2018 at LBNL. Mass was determined from the location of a nucleus after the transfer (the location helps determine its trajectory, which is linked to the mass-to-charge ratio of the nucleus, since the transfer was done in presence of a magnet).) (That all decays within a decay chain were indeed related to each other is established by the location of these decays, which must be in the same place.) The known nucleus can be recognized by the specific characteristics of decay it undergoes such as decay energy (or more specifically, the kinetic energy of the emitted particle). (Note: If the decay occurred in a vacuum, then since total momentum of an isolated system before and after the decay must be preserved, the daughter nucleus would also receive a small velocity. The ratio of the two velocities, and accordingly the ratio of the kinetic energies, would thus be inverse to the ratio of the two masses. The decay energy equals the sum of the known kinetic energy of the alpha particle and that of the daughter nucleus (an exact fraction of the former). The calculations hold for an experiment as well, but the difference is that the nucleus does not move after the decay because it is tied to the detector.) Spontaneous fission, however, produces various nuclei as products, so the original nuclide cannot be determined from its daughters. (Note: Spontaneous fission was discovered by Soviet physicist Georgy Flerov, a leading scientist at JINR, and thus it was a "hobbyhorse" for the facility. In contrast, the LBL scientists believed fission information was not sufficient for a claim of synthesis of an element. They believed spontaneous fission had not been studied enough to use it for identification of a new element, since there was a difficulty of establishing that a compound nucleus had only ejected neutrons and not charged particles like protons or alpha particles. They thus preferred to link new isotopes to the already known ones by successive alpha decays.)

The information available to physicists aiming to synthesize a superheavy element is thus the information collected at the detectors: location, energy, and time of arrival of a particle to the detector, and those of its decay. The physicists analyze this data and seek to conclude that it was indeed caused by a new element and could not have been caused by a different nuclide than the one claimed. Often, provided data is insufficient for a conclusion that a new element was definitely created and there is no other explanation for the observed effects; errors in interpreting data have been made. (Note: For instance, element 102 was mistakenly identified in 1957 at the Nobel Institute of Physics in Stockholm, Stockholm County, Sweden. There were no earlier definitive claims of creation of this element, and the element was assigned a name by its Swedish, American, and British discoverers, nobelium. It was later shown that the identification was incorrect. The following year, RL was unable to reproduce the Swedish results and announced instead their synthesis of the element; that claim was also disproved later. JINR insisted that they were the first to create the element and suggested a name of their own for the new element, joliotium; the Soviet name was also not accepted (JINR later referred to the naming of the element 102 as "hasty"). This name was proposed to IUPAC in a written response to their ruling on priority of discovery claims of elements, signed 29 September 1992. The name "nobelium" remained unchanged on account of its widespread usage.)

== History ==
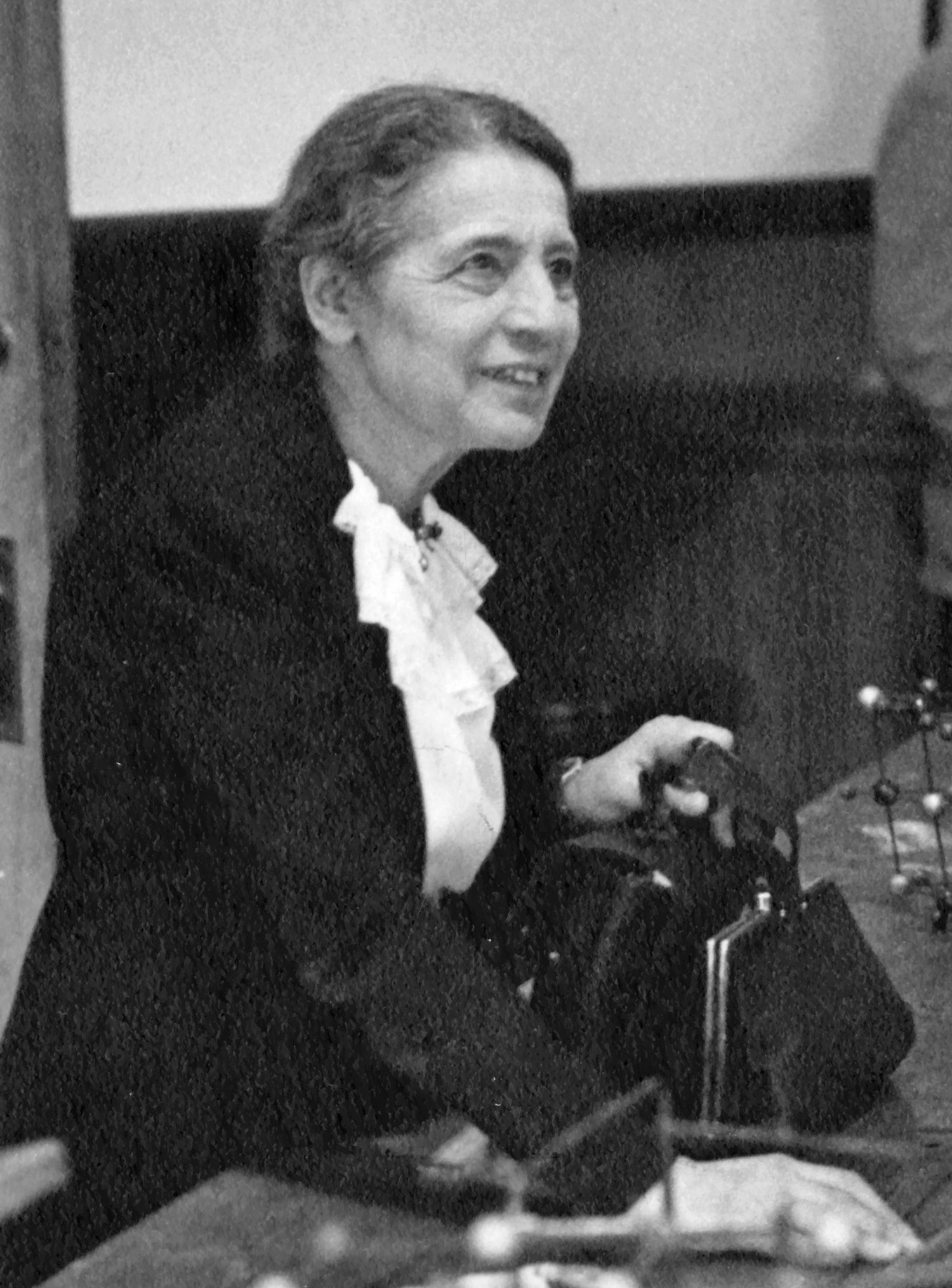
Meitnerium was named after Lise Meitner, one of the discoverers of nuclear fission.

=== Discovery ===
Meitnerium was first synthesized on August 29, 1982, by a German research team led by Peter Armbruster and Gottfried Münzenberg at the Institute for Heavy Ion Research (Gesellschaft für Schwerionenforschung) in Darmstadt. The team bombarded a target of bismuth-209 with accelerated nuclei of iron-58 and detected a single atom of the isotope meitnerium-266:

^{209}_{83}Bi + ^{58}_{26}Fe → ^{266}_{109}Mt + n

This work was confirmed three years later at the Joint Institute for Nuclear Research at Dubna (then in the Soviet Union).

=== Naming ===
In Mendeleev's nomenclature for unnamed and undiscovered elements, meitnerium would be called eka-iridium. In 1979, during the Transfermium Wars (but before the synthesis of meitnerium), IUPAC published recommendations per which the element was to be called unnilennium (symbol Une), a systematic element name as a placeholder, until the element is discovered (and the discovery then confirmed) and a permanent name is decided on. Though widely used in the chemical community on all levels, from chemistry classrooms to advanced textbooks, the recommendations were mostly ignored among scientists in the field, who either called it "element 109", with the symbol E109, (109) or even simply 109, or used the proposed name "meitnerium".

The naming of meitnerium was discussed in the Transfermium Wars regarding the names of elements 104–109, but meitnerium was the only proposal and thus was never disputed. The name meitnerium (Mt) was suggested by the GSI team in September 1992 in honor of Austrian physicist Lise Meitner, a co-discoverer of protactinium (with Otto Hahn), and one of the discoverers of nuclear fission. In 1994 the name was recommended by IUPAC, and was officially adopted in 1997. It is thus the only element named solely after a non-mythical woman (curium is named for both Pierre and Marie Curie).

== Isotopes ==
Meitnerium has no stable or naturally occurring isotopes. Several radioisotopes have been synthesized in the laboratory, either by fusing two atoms or from the decay of heavier elements. Eight isotopes of meitnerium have been reported with mass numbers 266, 268, 270, and 274–278, two of which, ^{268}Mt and ^{270}Mt, have unconfirmed metastable states. A ninth isotope, ^{282}Mt, is unconfirmed. Most of these decay by alpha emission, though some undergo spontaneous fission.

=== Stability and half-lives ===
List of meitnerium isotopes
Isotope	Half-life (Note: Different sources give different values for half-lives; the most recently published values are listed.)		Decay mode	Discovery year	Discovery reaction
Isotope	Value	ref	Decay mode	Discovery year	Discovery reaction
^{266}Mt	2.0 ms		α, SF	1982	^{209}Bi(^{58}Fe,n)
^{268}Mt	23 ms		α	1995	^{272}Rg(—,α)
^{270}Mt	800 ms		α	2004	^{278}Nh(—,2α)
^{274}Mt	640 ms		α	2007	^{282}Nh(—,2α)
^{275}Mt	20 ms		α	2004	^{287}Mc(—,3α)
^{276}Mt	620 ms		α	2004	^{288}Mc(—,3α)
^{277}Mt	5 ms		SF	2013	^{293}Ts(—,4α)
^{278}Mt	4.5 s		α	2010	^{294}Ts(—,4α)
^{282}Mt (Note: This isotope is unconfirmed)	67 s?		α	(2016)	^{290}Fl(e^{−},ν_{e}2α)

All meitnerium isotopes are extremely unstable (radioactive); in general, heavier isotopes are more stable than the lighter. The most stable known isotope, ^{278}Mt (half-life 4.5 seconds), is also the heaviest known. The unconfirmed ^{282}Mt is even heavier and seems to have a longer half-life, 67 seconds. With a half-life of 0.8 seconds, the next most stable known isotope is ^{270}Mt. ^{276}Mt and ^{274}Mt have half-lives of 0.62 and 0.64 seconds respectively.

^{277}Mt, created as the final decay product of ^{293}Ts for the first time in 2012, was observed to undergo spontaneous fission, half-life 5 milliseconds. Preliminary data analysis considered the possibility that this fission is instead from ^{277}Hs, for it also has a half-life of a few milliseconds, and could come from undetected electron capture somewhere in the decay chain. This possibility was later deemed very unlikely based on observed decay energies of ^{281}Ds and ^{281}Rg and the short half-life of ^{277}Mt, although there is still some uncertainty of the assignment. Regardless, the rapid fission of ^{277}Mt and ^{277}Hs is strongly suggestive of a region of instability for superheavy nuclei with N = 168–170. The existence of this region, characterized by a decrease in fission barrier height between the deformed shell closure at N = 162 and spherical shell closure at N = 184, is consistent with theoretical models.

== Predicted properties ==
Other than nuclear properties, no properties of meitnerium or its compounds have been measured; this is due to its extremely limited and expensive production (Note: In the millions of dollars) and the fact that meitnerium and its parents decay very quickly. Properties of meitnerium metal remain unknown and only predictions are available.

=== Chemical ===
Meitnerium is the seventh member of the 6d series of transition metals, and should be much like the platinum group metals. Calculations on its ionization potentials and atomic and ionic radii are similar to that of its lighter homolog iridium; implying that meitnerium's basic properties will resemble those of the other group 9 elements: cobalt, rhodium, and iridium.

Prediction of the chemical properties of meitnerium has not received much attention recently. Meitnerium is expected to be a noble metal. The standard electrode potential for the Mt^{3+}/Mt couple is expected to be 0.8 V. Based on the most stable oxidation states of the lighter group 9 elements, the most stable oxidation states of meitnerium are predicted to be +6, +3, and +1, with the +3 state being the most stable in aqueous solutions. Rhodium and iridium show a maximum oxidation state of +6; the most stable states are +4 and +3 for iridium and +3 for rhodium. The oxidation state +9, represented only by iridium in IrO_{4}^{+}, might be possible for meitnerium nonafluoride MtF_{9} and the MtO_{4}^{+} cation, though IrO_{4}^{+} is expected to be more stable than these meitnerium compounds. The meitnerium tetrahalides have also been predicted to have similar stabilities to those of iridium, thus also allowing a stable +4 state. It is further expected that the maximum oxidation states of elements from bohrium (element 107) to darmstadtium (110) may be stable in the gas phase but not in aqueous solution.

=== Physical and atomic ===
Meitnerium is expected to be a solid under normal conditions and assume a face-centered cubic crystal structure, similarly to its lighter congener iridium. It should be a very heavy metal with a density of around 27–28 g/cm^{3}, which would be among the highest of any of the 118 known elements. Meitnerium is also predicted to be paramagnetic.

Theoreticians have predicted the covalent radius of meitnerium to be 6 to 10 pm larger than that of iridium. The atomic radius of meitnerium is expected to be around 128 pm.

== Experimental chemistry ==
Meitnerium is the first element on whose chemistry has not yet been investigated. Unambiguous determination of its chemical properties is yet to have been established due to the short half-lives of meitnerium isotopes and a limited number of likely volatile compounds that could be studied on a tiny scale. One of the few meitnerium compounds that are likely to be volatile enough is meitnerium hexafluoride MtF_{6}, as its lighter homolog iridium hexafluoride (IrF_{6}) is volatile above 60°C, so the analogous compound of meitnerium might also be volatile enough; a volatile octafluoride MtF_{8} might also be possible. For chemical studies on a transactinide, at least four atoms must be produced, the half-life of the isotope used must be ≥1 second, and the rate of production must be at least one atom per week. Even though the half-life of ^{278}Mt, the most stable confirmed isotope, is 4.5 seconds, long enough for chemical studies, another obstacle is the need to increase the rate of production of meitnerium and allow experiments to carry on for weeks or months so that statistically significant results can be obtained. Separation and detection must be carried out continuously to separate out the meitnerium isotopes and have automated systems experiment on the gas-phase and solution chemistry of meitnerium, as the yields for heavier elements are predicted to be smaller than those for lighter elements; some of the separation techniques used for bohrium and hassium could be reused. However, the experimental chemistry of meitnerium has not received as much attention as that of the heavier elements from copernicium to livermorium.

Lawrence Berkeley National Laboratory tried to synthesize ^{271}Mt in 2002–2003 for a possible chemical investigation of meitnerium, as it was expected that it might be more stable than nearby isotopes due to having 162 neutrons, a magic number for deformed nuclei; its half-life was predicted to be a few seconds, long enough for a chemical investigation. However, no atoms of ^{271}Mt were detected; this isotope of meitnerium is currently unknown.

An experiment determining the chemical properties of a transactinide would need to compare a compound of that transactinide with analogous compounds of some of its lighter homologs: for example, in the chemical characterization of hassium, hassium tetroxide HsO_{4} was compared with the osmium analog, osmium tetroxide OsO_{4}. In a preliminary step toward determining the chemical properties of meitnerium, the GSI attempted sublimation of rhodium(III) oxide Rh_{2}O_{3} and rhodium(III) chloride RhCl_{3}. However, macroscopic amounts of the oxide would not sublimate until 1000°C and the chloride would not until 780°C, and then only in the presence of carbon aerosol particles: these temperatures are far too high for such procedures to be used on meitnerium, as most of the current methods used for the investigation of the chemistry of superheavies do not work above 500°C.

Following the 2014 successful synthesis of seaborgium hexacarbonyl, Sg(CO)_{6}, studies were conducted with the stable transition metals of groups 7–9, suggesting that carbonyl formation could be extended to further probe the chemistries of the early 6d transition metals from rutherfordium to meitnerium inclusive. Nevertheless, the challenges of low half-lives and difficult production, make meitnerium hard to access for chemists, though ^{278}Mt and ^{276}Mt are long-lived enough for chemical research and may be produced in the decay chains of ^{294}Ts and ^{288}Mc respectively. ^{276}Mt is likely more suitable, since producing tennessine requires a rare and rather short-lived berkelium target.^{270}Mt, observed in the decay chain of ^{278}Nh with a half-life of 0.69 second, may also be long-lived enough for chemical investigations, though a direct synthesis route leading to this isotope and more precise measurements of its decay properties would be required.

== Bibliography ==
- Audi, G.; Kondev, F. G.; Wang, M.; et al. (2017). "The NUBASE2016 evaluation of nuclear properties". Chinese Physics C. 41 (3) 030001. Bibcode:2017ChPhC..41c0001A. doi:10.1088/1674-1137/41/3/030001.
- Beiser, A. (2003). Concepts of modern physics (6th ed.). McGraw-Hill. ISBN 978-0-07-244848-1. OCLC 48965418.
- Hoffman, D. C.; Ghiorso, A.; Seaborg, G. T. (2000). The Transuranium People: The Inside Story. World Scientific. ISBN 978-1-78-326244-1.
- Kragh, H. (2018). From Transuranic to Superheavy Elements: A Story of Dispute and Creation. Springer. ISBN 978-3-319-75813-8.
- Zagrebaev, V.; Karpov, A.; Greiner, W. (2013). "Future of superheavy element research: Which nuclei could be synthesized within the next few years?". Journal of Physics: Conference Series. 420 (1) 012001. arXiv:1207.5700. Bibcode:2013JPhCS.420a2001Z. doi:10.1088/1742-6596/420/1/012001. ISSN 1742-6588. S2CID 55434734.
