= List of chemical element name etymologies =

Etymology of chemical elements

This article lists the etymology of chemical elements of the periodic table.

== History ==
Throughout the history of chemistry, many chemical elements have been discovered. In the 19th century, Dmitri Mendeleev formulated the periodic table, a table of elements which describes their structure. Because elements have been discovered at various times and places, from antiquity through the present day, their names have derived from several languages and cultures.

=== Named after places ===
Of the 118 known elements, 41 have names associated with, or specifically named after, places around the world or among astronomical objects. Of these, 32 have names tied to the places on Earth, and the other nine are named after Solar System objects; helium and selenium after the Sun and Moon; mercury (indirectly), tellurium, uranium and neptunium after the planets Mercury, Earth, Uranus and Neptune; plutonium and cerium after the dwarf planets Pluto and Ceres, both considered planets when the elements were named; and palladium after the asteroid Pallas.

=== Named after people ===
Nineteen elements are connected with the names of twenty people (as curium honours both Marie and Pierre Curie). Of these, only gadolinium and samarium occur in nature; the rest are synthetic. Fifteen elements were named after scientists; four other have indirect connection to the names of non-scientists. Only Glenn T. Seaborg and Yuri Oganessian were honoured during their lifetime by having elements named after them, and Oganessian is the only one still living. Elements named after four non-scientists in this table were actually named after a place or thing which in turn had been named after these people. Samarium was named from the mineral from which it was isolated, samarskite, which was named after Vassili Samarsky-Bykhovets. Berkelium and livermorium were named after the California cities Berkeley and Livermore, the locations of the Lawrence Berkeley and Lawrence Livermore national laboratories; the cities were named after George Berkeley and Robert Livermore. Americium was named after America, which was named after Amerigo Vespucci.

=== Named after mythological entities ===
Also, mythological entities have had a significant impact on the naming of elements, directly or indirectly. Cerium, europium, helium, iridium, mercury, neptunium, niobium, palladium, plutonium, promethium, selenium, tantalum, titanium, thorium, uranium and vanadium are all connected to mythological deities.

=== Named after minerals ===
Elements may also have been named after the minerals in which they were discovered. For example, beryllium is named after beryl.

=== Controversies and failed proposals ===
Other element names given after people have been proposed but failed to gain official international recognition. These include columbium (Cb), hahnium (Ha), joliotium (Jl), and kurchatovium (Ku), names connected to Christopher Columbus, Otto Hahn, Irène Joliot-Curie, and Igor Kurchatov; and also cassiopeium (Cp), a name coming from the constellation Cassiopeia and is hence indirectly connected to the mythological Cassiopeia.

== Current naming practices and procedures ==
For the last two decades, IUPAC has been the governing body for naming elements. IUPAC has also provided a temporary name and symbol for unknown or recently synthesized elements.

== List ==
Etymology of the chemical element names
Element		Original word	Language of origin	Meaning	Nature of origin
Name (symbol)	Z	Description (symbol etymology, former names)			
Hydrogen (H)	1	ὕδωρ (root: ὑδρ-) + γενής (hydor genes)	Greek via Latin and French	"water + begetter"	descriptive
Hydrogen (H)	1	From French hydrogène and Latin hydro- and -genes, derived from the Greek ὕδωρ γείνομαι (hydor geinomai), meaning "Ι beget water".			
Helium (He)	2	ἥλιος (hélios)	Greek	"sun"	astrological; mythological
Helium (He)	2	Named after the Greek ἥλιος (helios), meaning "the sun" or the mythological sun-god. It was first identified by its characteristic emission lines in the Sun's spectrum.			
Lithium (Li)	3	λίθος (lithos)	Greek	"stone"	
Lithium (Li)	3	From Greek λίθος (lithos) meaning "stone", because it was discovered from a mineral while other common alkali metals (sodium and potassium) were discovered from plant tissue.			
Beryllium (Be)	4	City of Belur in India via Greek βήρυλλος (beryllos)	Sanskrit, Pali, and Prakrit via Greek, Latin, Old French, and Middle English	"beryl", a mineral	descriptive (colour)
Beryllium (Be)	4	βήρυλλος (beryllos), denoting beryl, which contains beryllium. The word is derived (via Latin: beryllus and French: béryl) from the Greek βήρυλλος (bērullos), "a blue-green spar", from Prakrit वॆरुलिय‌ (veruliya), from Pāli वेलुरिय (veḷuriya), भेलिरु (veḷiru) or भिलर् (viḷar): "to become pale", in reference to the pale semiprecious gemstone beryl.			
Boron (B)	5	بورق (buraq)	Arabic, Medieval Latin, Anglo-Norman, Middle French, and Middle English		
Boron (B)	5	From the Arabic بورق (buraq), which refers to borax. Possibly derived from Persian بوره (burah). The Arabic was adapted as Medieval Latin baurach, Anglo-Norman boreis, and Middle English boras, which became the source of the English "boron".			
Carbon (C)	6	charbone	Latin via French	"charcoal"	
Carbon (C)	6	From French charbone, which in turn came from Latin carbō, meaning "charcoal" and is related to carbōn, meaning "a coal". (The German and Dutch names, "Kohlenstoff" and "koolstof", respectively, both literally mean "coal matter".) These words come from the Proto-Indo-European base *ker- meaning "heat", "fire", or "to burn".			
Nitrogen (N)	7	νίτρον (Latin: nitrum) -γενής (-genes)	Greek via Latin and French	"native-soda begetter"	descriptive
Nitrogen (N)	7	From French nitrogène derived from Greek νίτρον γείνομαι (nitron geinomai), meaning "I form/beget native-soda (niter)". The original source is either the Arabic word نطرون (natrun) or the Egyptian word netjeri. (See the entry on Sodium below).			
Nitrogen (N)	7	· Former name azote (French), from Greek ἄζωτος (azōtos) "lifeless" but possibly inspired by azoth, one of the alchemical names of mercury, from Andalusian Arabic al-zuq, the Classical Arabic name of that element.			
Oxygen (O)	8	ὀξύ γείνομαι (oxy geinomai)/oxygène	Greek via French	"to bring forth acid"	
Oxygen (O)	8	From Greek ὀξύ γείνομαι (oxy geinomai), meaning "Ι bring forth acid", as it was believed to be an essential component of acids. This phrase was corrupted into the French oxygène, which became the source of the English "oxygen".			
Fluorine (F)	9	fluor	Latin	"a flowing"	
Fluorine (F)	9	From Latin fluor meaning "a flowing", from mineral name fluorspar (calcium fluoride). Fluorspar was used to make iron flowing in smelting.			
Neon (Ne)	10	νέος (neos)	Greek	"new"	
Neon (Ne)	10	From Greek νέος (neos), meaning "new".			
Sodium (Na)	11	soda	English		
Sodium (Na)	11	From the English "soda", used in names of sodium compounds such as caustic soda, soda ash, and baking soda. Probably from Italian sida (or directly from Medieval Latin soda) meaning "a kind of saltwort", from which soda was obtained, of uncertain origin.			
Sodium (Na)	11	· Symbol Na is from the Neo-Latin noun natrium, derived from Greek νίτρον (nítron), "natural soda, a kind of salt". The original source is either the Arabic word نطرون (natrun) or the Egyptian word netjeri. R8 X1			
Magnesium (Mg)	12	Μαγνησία (Magnesia)	Greek		toponym
Magnesium (Mg)	12	From the Ancient Greek Μαγνησία (Magnesia) (district in Thessaly), where it was discovered.			
Aluminium (Al)	13	alumen	Latin	"alum" (literally: bitter salt)	
Aluminium (Al)	13	Latin alumen, which means "alum" (literally: bitter salt).			
Silicon (Si)	14	silex, silicis	Latin	"flint"	descriptive
Silicon (Si)	14	From Latin silex or silicis, which means "flint", a kind of stone (chiefly silicon dioxide).			
Phosphorus (P)	15	φῶς + φόρος (phos + phoros)	Greek via Latin	"light-bearer"	descriptive
Phosphorus (P)	15	From Greek φῶς + φόρος (phos + phoros), which means "light bearer", because white phosphorus emits a faint glow upon exposure to oxygen. Phosphorus was the ancient name for Venus, or Hesperus, the Morning Star.			
Sulfur (S)	16	Old Latin sulpur (later sulphur, sulfur) Proto-Indo-European *swépl̥ (genitive *sulplós), nominal derivative of *swelp.	Latin Proto-Indo-European (PIE)	"to burn"	
Sulfur (S)	16	The word came into Middle English from Anglo-Norman sulfre, itself derived through Old French soulfre from Late Latin sulfur. From Proto-Indo-European *swelp "to burn"			
Chlorine (Cl)	17	χλωρός (chlorós)	Greek	"pale green"	descriptive (colour)
Chlorine (Cl)	17	From Greek χλωρός (chlorós), which means "yellowish green" or "greenish yellow", because of the colour of the gas.			
Argon (Ar)	18	ἀργόν (argon)	Greek	"inactive"	descriptive
Argon (Ar)	18	Greek argon means "inactive" (literally: "slow").			
Potassium (K)	19	potassa; potasch via potash	Neo-Latin via Dutch and English	"pot-ash"	
Potassium (K)	19	From the English "potash": pot-ash (potassium compound prepared from an alkali extracted in a pot from the ash of burnt wood or tree leaves). Potash is a calque of Dutch potaschen, which means "pot ashes".			
Potassium (K)	19	· Symbol K is from the Latin name kalium, from Arabic القلي (al qalīy), which means "calcined ashes".			
Calcium (Ca)	20	χάλιξ/calx	Greek/Latin	"pebble"/"limestone"	
Calcium (Ca)	20	From Latin calx, which means "lime". Calcium was known as early as the first century when the Ancient Romans prepared lime as calcium oxide.			
Scandium (Sc)	21	Scandia	Latin	"Scandinavia"	toponym
Scandium (Sc)	21	Named from Latin Scandia, "Scandinavia".			
Scandium (Sc)	21	· Former name eka-boron			
Titanium (Ti)	22	Τιτάν, GEN: Τιτάνος (Titan)	Greek	"Titans", sons of Gaia	mythological
Titanium (Ti)	22	After the "Titans", the first offspring of Gaia in Greek mythology.			
Vanadium (V)	23	Vanadís	Old Norse	"Dís of the Vanir"	mythological
Vanadium (V)	23	From Old Norse Vanadís, one of the names of the Vanr goddess Freyja in Norse mythology, because of multicoloured chemical compounds deemed beautiful.			
Chromium (Cr)	24	χρῶμα (chróma)	Greek via French	"colour"	descriptive (colour)
Chromium (Cr)	24	From Greek χρῶμα (chróma), "colour", because of its multicoloured compounds. This word was adapted as the French chrome, and adding the suffix -ium created the English "chromium".			
Manganese (Mn)	25	Μαγνησία (Magnesia; Medieval Latin: magnesia)	Greek via Latin, Italian, and French	"Magnesia (regional unit)", Greece	descriptive, toponym
Manganese (Mn)	25	From Latin Magnesia, ultimately from Ancient Greek region Magnesia. The word Magnesia evolved into manganese in Italian and into manganèse in French.			
Iron (Fe)	26	īsern (earlier: īren/īsen) /yren/yron	Old English via Middle English	"holy metal or strong metal"	descriptive
Iron (Fe)	26	From the Anglo-Saxon īsern which is derived from Proto-Germanic isarnan meaning "holy metal" or "strong metal".			
Iron (Fe)	26	· Symbol Fe is from Latin ferrum, meaning "iron".			
Cobalt (Co)	27	Kobold	German	"goblin"	
Cobalt (Co)	27	From German Kobold, which means "goblin". The metal was named by miners, because it was poisonous and troublesome (polluted and degraded by other mined elements, such as nickel). Other sources cite the origin in the silver miners' belief that cobalt had been placed by "Kobolds", who had stolen the silver. Some suggest that the name may have been derived from Greek κόβαλος (kobalos), which means "mine" and which may have common roots with kobold, goblin, and cobalt.			
Nickel (Ni)	28	Kopparnickel/ Kupfernickel	Swedish via German	"copper-coloured ore"	descriptive
Nickel (Ni)	28	From Swedish kopparnickel, meaning "copper-coloured ore". This referred to the ore niccolite from which it was obtained.			
Copper (Cu)	29	Κύπριος (Kyprios)?	Greek? via Latin, West Germanic, Old English, and Middle English	"who/which is from Cyprus"	toponym
Copper (Cu)	29	Possibly from Greek Κύπριος (Kyprios) (which comes from Κύπρος (Kypros), the Greek name of Cyprus) via Latin cuprum, West Germanic *kupar, Old English coper/copor, and Middle English coper. The Latin term, during the Roman Empire, was aes cyprium; aes was the generic term for copper alloys such as bronze. Cyprium means "Cyprus" or "which is from Cyprus", where so much of it was mined; it was simplified to cuprum and then eventually Anglicized as "copper" (Old English coper/copor).			
Copper (Cu)	29	· Symbol Cu is from the Latin name cuprum ("copper").			
Zinc (Zn)	30	Zink	German	?"Cornet"	
Zinc (Zn)	30	From German Zink which is related to Zinken "prong, point", probably alluding to its spiky crystals. May be derived from Old Persian.			
Gallium (Ga)	31	Gallia	Latin	"Gaul" (Ancient France)	toponym
Gallium (Ga)	31	From Latin Gallia, which means "Gaul" (Ancient France), and also gallus, which means "rooster". The element was obtained as free metal by Lecoq de Boisbaudran, who named it after his native land France. Allegations were later made that he had also named it after himself, as gallus is Latin for le coq ("rooster"), but he denied that this had been his intention.			
Gallium (Ga)	31	· Former name eka-aluminium by Mendeleev, who had predicted its existence.			
Germanium (Ge)	32	Germania	Latin	"Germany"	toponym
Germanium (Ge)	32	From Latin Germania, which means "Germany".			
Germanium (Ge)	32	· Former name eka-silicon by Mendeleev.			
Arsenic (As)	33	ἀρσενικόν (arsenikon)	Syriac/Persian via Greek, Latin, Old French, and Middle English	?"male"	descriptive (colour)
Arsenic (As)	33	From Greek ἀρσενικόν (arsenikon), which is adapted from Syriac ܠܫܢܐܠܐ ܙܐܦܢܝܐ ((al) zarniqa) and Persian زرنيخ (zarnik), "yellow orpiment". The Greek arsenikon is paretymologically related to the Greek word ἀρσενικός (arsenikos), which means "masculine" or "potent". These words were adapted as the Latin arsenicum and Old French arsenic, which is the source for the English arsenic.			
Selenium (Se)	34	σελήνη (selene)	Greek	"moon"	astrological; mythological
Selenium (Se)	34	From Greek σελήνη (selene), which means "Moon", and also the moon-goddess Selene.			
Bromine (Br)	35	βρῶμος (brómos)	Greek via French	"dirt" or "stench" (of male goat)	
Bromine (Br)	35	βρῶμος (brómos) means "stench" (literally: "clangor"), due to its characteristic smell.			
Krypton (Kr)	36	κρυπτός (kryptos)	Greek	"hidden"	descriptive
Krypton (Kr)	36	From Greek κρυπτός (kryptos), which means "hidden one", because of its colourless, odourless, tasteless, gaseous properties, as well as its rarity in nature.			
Rubidium (Rb)	37	rubidus	Latin	"deepest red"	descriptive (colour)
Rubidium (Rb)	37	From Latin rubidus, which means "deepest red", because of the colour of a spectral line.			
Strontium (Sr)	38	Strontian	Scottish Gaelic via English	proper name	toponym
Strontium (Sr)	38	Named after strontianite, the mineral. Strontianite itself was named after the town of Strontian (Scotland) where the mineral was found; Sròn an t-Sìthein literally means "nose ['point'] of the fairy hill".			
Yttrium (Y)	39	Ytterby	Swedish	proper name	toponym
Yttrium (Y)	39	Named after the mineral yttria (yttrium oxide), where it was originally extracted from. Yttria itself was named after Ytterby, Sweden.			
Zirconium (Zr)	40	ܙܐܪܓܥܢܥ (zargono), زرگون (zargûn)	Syriac/Persian via Arabic and German	"gold-like"	
Zirconium (Zr)	40	From Arabic زركون (zarkûn). Derived from Persian زرگون (zargûn), which means "gold-like". Zirkon is the German variant of these and is the origin of the English zircon.			
Niobium (Nb)	41	Νιόβη (Niobe)	Greek	"snowy"	mythological
Niobium (Nb)	41	Named after Niobe, daughter of Tantalus in classical mythology.			
Niobium (Nb)	41	· Former name columbium from Columbia, personification of the United States.			
Molybdenum (Mo)	42	μόλυβδος (molybdos)	Greek	"lead-like"	descriptive
Molybdenum (Mo)	42	From Greek μόλυβδος (molybdos), "lead", due to confusion with lead ore galena.			
Technetium (Tc)	43	τεχνητός (technetos)	Greek	"artificial"	descriptive
Technetium (Tc)	43	From Greek τεχνητός (technetos), which means "artificial", because it was the first artificially produced element.			
Technetium (Tc)	43	· Former name eka-manganese			
Ruthenium (Ru)	44	Ruthenia	Latin	"Ruthenia", Kievan Rus'	toponym (exonym)
Ruthenium (Ru)	44	From Latin Ruthenia, geographical exonym for Kievan Rus'.			
Rhodium (Rh)	45	ῥόδον (rhodon)	Greek	"rose"	descriptive (colour)
Rhodium (Rh)	45	From Greek ῥόδον (rhodon), which means "rose". From its rose-red compounds.			
Palladium (Pd)	46	Παλλάς (genitive: Παλλάδος) (Pallas)	Greek via Latin	"little maiden"	astrological; mythological
Palladium (Pd)	46	Named after Pallas, the asteroid discovered two years earlier. The asteroid itself was named after Pallas Athena, goddess of wisdom and victory. The word Palladium is derived from Greek Παλλάδιον and is the neuter version of Παλλάδιος, meaning "of Pallas".			
Silver (Ag)	47	𒊭𒁺𒁍/𒊭𒅈𒇥 (siolfor/seolfor)	Akkadian via Old English and Middle English	"to refine", "smelt"	
Silver (Ag)	47	Possibly borrowed from Akkadian 𒊭𒅈𒇥 (sarpu) "refined silver" and related to 𒊭𒁺𒁍 (sarapu) "to refine", "smelt". From Old English, seolfor which was derived from Proto-Germanic *silubra-; compare Old High German silabar; and has cognates in Balto-Slavic languages: sĭrebro, sidabras, Old Prussian sirablan. Alternatively, possibly from one of the Pre-Indo-European languages, compare zilar.			
Silver (Ag)	47	· Symbol Ag is from the Latin name argentum ("silver"), which is derived from Proto-Indo-European *arg-ent-.			
Cadmium (Cd)	48	καδμεία (kadmeia)	Greek/Latin	"Earth" (as classical element), "calamine" or Cadmean earth^{[?]}	
Cadmium (Cd)	48	From Latin cadmia, which is derived from Greek καδμεία (kadmeia) and means "calamine", a cadmium-bearing mixture of minerals. Cadmium is named after Cadmus (in Greek: Κάδμος: Kadmos), a character in Greek mythology and calamine is derived from Le Calamine, the French name of the Belgian town of Kelmis.			
Indium (In)	49	indigo	Greek via Latin and English		descriptive (colour)
Indium (In)	49	Named after indigo, because of an indigo-coloured spectrum line. The English word indigo is from Spanish indico and Dutch indigo (from Portuguese endego), from Latin indigo, from Greek ἰνδικόν (indikon): "blue dye from India".			
Tin (Sn)	50	tin	Anglo-Saxon via Middle English		
Tin (Sn)	50	The word tin is borrowed from a Proto-Indo-European language, and has cognates in several Germanic and Celtic languages.			
Tin (Sn)	50	· Symbol Sn is from its Latin name stannum.			
Antimony (Sb)	51		Greek? via Medieval Latin and Middle English	various	
Antimony (Sb)	51	Possibly from Greek ἀντί + μόνος (anti + monos), approximately meaning "opposed to solitude", as believed never to exist in pure form, or ἀντί + μοναχός (anti + monachos) for "monk-killer" (in French folk etymology, anti-moine "monk's bane"), because many early alchemists were monks, and antimony is poisonous. This may also be derived from the Pharaonic (Ancient Egyptian), Antos Ammon (expression), which could be translated as "bloom of the god Ammo".			
Antimony (Sb)	51	· Symbol Sb is from Latin name stibium, which is derived from Greek Στίβι (stíbi), a variant of στίμμι (stimmi); genitive: στίμμεος or στίμμιδος; probably a loan word from Arabic or Egyptian sdm meaning "eyepaint". O34 D46 G17 F21 D4			
Tellurium (Te)	52	Tellus	Latin	"Earth"	
Tellurium (Te)	52	From Latin tellus, "Earth".			
Iodine (I)	53	ἰώδης (iodes)	Greek via French	"violet"	descriptive (colour)
Iodine (I)	53	Named after the Greek ἰώδης (iodes), which means "violet", because of the colour of the gaseous phase. This word was adapted as the French iode, which is the source of the English "iodine".			
Xenon (Xe)	54	ξένος (xenos)	Greek	"foreign"	
Xenon (Xe)	54	From the Greek adjective ξένος (xenos): "foreign", "a stranger".			
Caesium (Cs)	55	caesius	Latin	"blue-grey" or "sky blue"	descriptive (colour)
Caesium (Cs)	55	From Latin caesius, which means "sky blue". Its identification was based upon the bright blue lines in its spectrum, and it was the first element discovered by spectrum analysis.			
Barium (Ba)	56	βαρύς (barys)	Greek via Neo-Latin	"heavy"	
Barium (Ba)	56	βαρύς (barys) means "heavy". The oxide was initially called "barote", then "baryta", which was modified to "barium" to describe the metal. Humphry Davy gave the element this name because it was originally found in baryte, which shares the same source.			
Lanthanum (La)	57	λανθάνειν (lanthanein)	Greek	"to escape notice"	
Lanthanum (La)	57	From Greek λανθάνω (lanthánō), "I escape notice".			
Cerium (Ce)	58	ceres	Latin	"grain", "bread"	astrological; mythological
Cerium (Ce)	58	Named after the asteroid Ceres, discovered two years earlier. The asteroid itself, now classified as a dwarf planet, was named after Ceres, the goddess of fertility in Roman mythology. Ceres is derived from Proto-Indo-European *ker-es- from base *ker- meaning "to grow".			
Praseodymium (Pr)	59	πράσιος δίδυμος (prasios didymos)	Greek	"green twin"	descriptive
Praseodymium (Pr)	59	From Greek πράσιος δίδυμος (prasios didymos), meaning "green twin", because didymium separates into praseodymium and neodymium.			
Neodymium (Nd)	60	νέος δίδυμος (neos didymos)	Greek	"new twin"	descriptive
Neodymium (Nd)	60	From Greek νέος διδύμος (neos didymos), which means "new twin", because didymium separates into praseodymium and neodymium.			
Promethium (Pm)	61	Προμηθεύς (Prometheus)	Greek	"forethought"	mythological
Promethium (Pm)	61	Named after Prometheus (a god in classical mythology), who stole the fire of heaven and gave it to mankind.			
Samarium (Sm)	62	Samarsky-Bykhovets, Vassili			eponym
Samarium (Sm)	62	Named after the mineral samarskite, itself named after Colonel Vassili Samarsky-Bykhovets, a Russian mine official.			
Europium (Eu)	63	Εὐρώπη (Europe)	Ancient Greek	"broad-faced" or "well-watered"	toponym; mythological
Europium (Eu)	63	Named after Europe, where it was discovered. Europe itself was named after Europa (consort of Zeus).			
Gadolinium (Gd)	64	Gadolin, Johan	Finnish		eponym
Gadolinium (Gd)	64	Named in honour of Johan Gadolin, who was one of the founders of Nordic chemistry research, and who discovered § yttrium. The mineral gadolinite is also named after him.			
Terbium (Tb)	65	Ytterby	Swedish	proper name	toponym
Terbium (Tb)	65	Named after Ytterby, the village in Sweden where the element was first discovered.			
Dysprosium (Dy)	66	δυσπρόσιτος (dysprositos)	Greek	"hard to get at"	descriptive
Dysprosium (Dy)	66	From Greek δυσπρόσιτος (dysprositos), which means "hard to get at".			
Holmium (Ho)	67	Holmia	Latin	"Stockholm"	toponym
Holmium (Ho)	67	From Latin Holmia, "Stockholm".			
Erbium (Er)	68	Ytterby	Swedish	proper name	toponym
Erbium (Er)	68	Named after Ytterby, Sweden, where large concentrations of minerals yttria and erbia are located. Erbia and terbia were confused at this time. After 1860, what had been known as terbia was renamed erbia, and after 1877, what had been known as erbia was renamed terbia.			
Thulium (Tm)	69	Θούλη (Thoúlē)	Greek	"Thule"	mythological
Thulium (Tm)	69	Named after Thule, an ancient Roman and Greek name (Θούλη) for a mythical country in the far north, perhaps Scandinavia.			
Ytterbium (Yb)	70	Ytterby	Swedish	proper name	toponym
Ytterbium (Yb)	70	Named after ytterbia, the oxide compound of ytterbium. Ytterbia itself was named after Ytterby, Sweden.			
Lutetium (Lu)	71	Lutetia	Latin	"Paris"	toponym
Lutetium (Lu)	71	Named after the Latin Lutetia (Gaulish for "place of mud"), the city of Paris.			
Hafnium (Hf)	72	Hafnia	Latin	"Copenhagen"	toponym
Hafnium (Hf)	72	From Latin Hafnia: "Copenhagen", Denmark.			
Tantalum (Ta)	73	Τάνταλος (Tantalus)	Greek	possibly "the bearer" or "the sufferer"	mythological
Tantalum (Ta)	73	Named after Greek Τάνταλος (Tantalus), who was punished after death by being condemned to stand knee-deep in water. If he bent to drink the water, it drained below the level he could reach (in Greek mythology). This was considered similar to tantalum's general non-reactivity (that is, "unreachability") because of its inertness (it sits among reagents and is unaffected by them).			
Tungsten (W)	74	tung sten	Swedish and Danish	"heavy stone"	descriptive
Tungsten (W)	74	From the Swedish and Danish "tung sten", which means "heavy stone".			
Tungsten (W)	74	· Symbol W is from the German name Wolfram.			
Tungsten (W)	74	· Former name Wolfrahm (German, literally "wolf cream") was the historical name. The names wolfram or volfram are still used in German and several other languages.			
Rhenium (Re)	75	Rhenus	Latin	"Rhine"	toponym
Rhenium (Re)	75	From Latin Rhenus, the river Rhine.			
Osmium (Os)	76	ὀσμή (osme)	Greek via Neo-Latin	"a smell"	descriptive
Osmium (Os)	76	From Greek ὀσμή (osme), meaning "a smell", as osmium tetroxide is foul-smelling.			
Iridium (Ir)	77	ἴρις (genitive: ἴριδος) (iris)	Greek via Latin	"of rainbows"	descriptive (colour)
Iridium (Ir)	77	Named after the Latin noun iris, which means "rainbow, iris plant, iris of the eye", because many of its salts are strongly coloured; Iris was originally the name of the goddess of rainbows and a messenger in Greek mythology.			
Platinum (Pt)	78	platina (del Pinto)	Spanish via Neo-Latin	"little silver" (of the Pinto River)	descriptive
Platinum (Pt)	78	From the Spanish, platina, which means "little silver", because it was first encountered in a silver mine. The modern Spanish is platino. Platina is a diminutive of plata (silver); it is a loan word from French plate or Provençal plata (sheet of metal) and is the origin of the English "plate".			
Gold (Au)	79	gold	Old English via Middle English		descriptive (colour)
Gold (Au)	79	From the Old English "gold", from Proto-Indo-European *ghel- meaning "yellow/ bright".			
Gold (Au)	79	· Symbol Au is from Latin aurum, which means "shining dawn".			
Mercury (Hg)	80	Mercurius	Latin	"Mercury", Roman god	mythological
Mercury (Hg)	80	Named after Mercury, the god of speed and messenger of the Gods, as was the planet Mercury named after the god.			
Mercury (Hg)	80	· Symbol Hg is from Latin hydrargyrum, which is from the Greek words ὕδωρ and ἀργυρός (hydor and argyros). Meaning "water-silver", because it is a liquid like water (at room temperature), and has a silvery metallic sheen.			
Thallium (Tl)	81	θαλλός (thallos)	Greek	"green twig"	descriptive
Thallium (Tl)	81	From Greek θαλλός (thallos), which means "a green shoot (twig)", because of its bright-green spectral emission lines.			
Lead (Pb)	82	lead	Anglo-Saxon		
Lead (Pb)	82	· Symbol Pb is from the Latin name plumbum, still visible in the English plumbing.			
Bismuth (Bi)	83	bisemutum	Neo-Latin from German	"white mass"	descriptive (colour)
Bismuth (Bi)	83	bisemutum is derived from German Wismuth, perhaps from weiße Masse, and means "white mass", due to its appearance.			
Polonium (Po)	84	Polonia	Latin	"Poland"	toponym
Polonium (Po)	84	Named after Poland, homeland of discoverer Marie Curie.			
Polonium (Po)	84	· Former name radium F			
Astatine (At)	85	ἄστατος (astatos)	Greek	"unstable"	
Astatine (At)	85	From Greek ἄστατος (astatos), meaning "unstable".			
Astatine (At)	85	· Former name alabamine (Ab) was an earlier proposed name for astatine			
Radon (Rn)	86	radium	Latin via German and English		
Radon (Rn)	86	Contraction of radium emanation, since the element appears in the radioactive decay of radium.			
Radon (Rn)	86	· Former name niton (Nt), from Latin nitens "shining", because of the radioluminescence of radon.			
Francium (Fr)	87	France	French		toponym
Francium (Fr)	87	Named after France (literally: "Land of the Franks"), where it was discovered, at the Curie Institute, Paris.			
Radium (Ra)	88	radius	Latin via French	"ray"	descriptive
Radium (Ra)	88	From Latin radius meaning "ray", because of its radioactivity.			
Actinium (Ac)	89	ἀκτίς (aktis)	Greek	"beam"	
Actinium (Ac)	89	From Greek ἀκτίς/ἀκτῖνος (aktis/aktinos), which means "beam (ray)".			
Thorium (Th)	90	Þōrr (Thor)	Old Norse	"thunder"	mythological
Thorium (Th)	90	From Old Norse Þōrr (Thor), a god associated with thunder in Norse mythology.			
Thorium (Th)	90	· Former name ionium (Io) was given early in the study of radioactive elements to the Thorium-230 isotope.			
Protactinium (Pa)	91	πρῶτος + ἀκτίς	Greek	"first beam element"	descriptive?
Protactinium (Pa)	91	From Greek proto- "first" + Neo-Latin actinium (itself from Greek ἀκτίς, gen.^{[?]}: ἀκτῖνος) "ray": proto(-)actinium, later shortened to protactinium.			
Uranium (U)	92	Οὐρανός (Ouranos); "Uranus"	Greek via Latin	"sky"	astrological; mythological
Uranium (U)	92	Named after the planet Uranus, which had been discovered eight years earlier in 1781. The planet was named after the god Uranus, the god of sky and heaven in Greek mythology.			
Neptunium (Np)	93	Neptunus	Latin	"Neptune"	astrological; mythological
Neptunium (Np)	93	Named after Neptune, the planet. The planet itself was named after Neptune, the god of oceans in Roman mythology.			
Plutonium (Pu)	94	Πλούτων (Ploutōn) via "Pluto"	Greek via Latin	"god of wealth"	astrological; mythological
Plutonium (Pu)	94	Named after the dwarf planet Pluto (then considered to be the ninth planet), because it was discovered directly after element neptunium (§ Np) and is higher than element uranium (§ U) in the periodic table. Thus, plutonium was named by analogy with the ordering of the planets, ending with Pluto. Pluto itself was named after Pluto, a Greek god of the dead. Greek Πλούτων (Ploutōn) is related to the word πλοῦτος (ploutos) meaning "wealth".			
Americium (Am)	95	America			toponym
Americium (Am)	95	Named after the Americas, because it was discovered in the United States; by analogy with europium (§ Eu). The name of the continent America itself is derived from the name of the Italian navigator Amerigo Vespucci.			
Curium (Cm)	96	Curie, Marie and Pierre			eponym
Curium (Cm)	96	Named in honour of Marie and Pierre Curie, who discovered radium and researched radioactivity.			
Berkelium (Bk)	97	University of California, Berkeley	Anglo-Saxon via English		toponym
Berkelium (Bk)	97	Named after the University of California, Berkeley, where it was discovered. The city of Berkeley itself was named after George Berkeley.			
Californium (Cf)	98	California	English		toponym
Californium (Cf)	98	Named after the state of California, US, and the University of California, Berkeley. The origin of the name California is disputed.			
Einsteinium (Es)	99	Einstein, Albert	German		eponym
Einsteinium (Es)	99	Named in honour of Albert Einstein, for his work on theoretical physics, which included the photoelectric effect.			
Fermium (Fm)	100	Fermi, Enrico	Italian	Italian surname	eponym
Fermium (Fm)	100	Named in honour of Enrico Fermi, who developed the first nuclear reactor, quantum mechanics, nuclear and particle physics, and statistical mechanics.			
Mendelevium (Md)	101	Mendeleyev, Dmitri			eponym
Mendelevium (Md)	101	Named in honour of Dmitri Mendeleyev, who formulated the periodic table.			
Mendelevium (Md)	101	· Former name eka-thulium.			
Nobelium (No)	102	Nobel, Alfred			eponym
Nobelium (No)	102	Named in honour of Alfred Nobel, who invented dynamite and instituted the Nobel Prizes foundation.			
Lawrencium (Lr)	103	Lawrence, Ernest			eponym
Lawrencium (Lr)	103	Named in honour of Ernest Lawrence, who was involved in the development of the cyclotron.			
Lawrencium (Lr)	103	· Symbol Lw was used formerly, Lr is used since 1963.			
Rutherfordium (Rf)	104	Rutherford, Ernest			eponym
Rutherfordium (Rf)	104	Named in honour of Ernest Rutherford, who pioneered the Bohr model of the atom. Rutherfordium has also been called kurchatovium (Ku), named in honour of Igor Kurchatov, who helped develop understanding of the uranium chain reaction and the nuclear reactor.			
Rutherfordium (Rf)	104	· Former name unnilquadium (Unq, '104'): temporary systematic name and symbol			
Dubnium (Db)	105	Дубна (Dubna)	Russian		toponym
Dubnium (Db)	105	Named after Dubna, Russia, location of the Joint Institute for Nuclear Research (JINR) where it was discovered.			
Dubnium (Db)	105	· Former names: hahnium (Ha) was proposed by researchers at the University of California, Berkeley, in honour of Otto Hahn, for his pioneering work in radioactivity and radiochemistry, but the proposal was rejected. unnilpentium (Unp, '105'): temporary systematic name and symbol.			
Seaborgium (Sg)	106	Seaborg, Glenn Teodor	Swedish via English	Swedish surname	eponym
Seaborgium (Sg)	106	Named in honour of Glenn T. Seaborg, who discovered the chemistry of the transuranium elements, shared in the discovery and isolation of ten elements, and developed and proposed the actinide series.			
Seaborgium (Sg)	106	· Former names: eka-tungsten, unnilhexium (Unh, '106'): temporary systematic name and symbol.			
Bohrium (Bh)	107	Bohr, Niels			eponym
Bohrium (Bh)	107	Named in honour of Niels Bohr, who made fundamental contributions to the understanding of atomic structure and quantum mechanics.			
Bohrium (Bh)	107	· Former name unnilseptium (Uns, '107'): temporary systematic name and symbol.			
Hassium (Hs)	108	Hassia	Latin	"Hesse"	toponym
Hassium (Hs)	108	From Latin Hassia, meaning Hessen, the German state where it was discovered at the GSI Helmholtz Centre for Heavy Ion Research, Darmstadt.			
Hassium (Hs)	108	· Former names: eka-osmium, unniloctium (Uno, '108'): temporary systematic name and symbol.			
Meitnerium (Mt)	109	Meitner, Lise			eponym
Meitnerium (Mt)	109	Named in honour of Lise Meitner, who shared discovery of nuclear fission.			
Meitnerium (Mt)	109	· Former names: eka-iridium, unnilennium (Une, '109'): temporary systematic name and symbol.			
Darmstadtium (Ds)	110	Darmstadt	German	proper name	toponym
Darmstadtium (Ds)	110	Named after Darmstadt, where it was discovered at the GSI Helmholtz Centre for Heavy Ion Research.			
Darmstadtium (Ds)	110	· Former name eka-platinum, ununnilium (Uun, '110'): temporary systematic name and symbol.			
Roentgenium (Rg)	111	Röntgen, Wilhelm Conrad			eponym
Roentgenium (Rg)	111	Named in honour of Wilhelm Röntgen, who discovered and produced X-rays.			
Roentgenium (Rg)	111	· Former names: eka-gold, unununium (Uuu, '111'): temporary systematic name and symbol.			
Copernicium (Cn)	112	Copernicus, Nicolaus	Polish via Latin	Polish surname	eponym
Copernicium (Cn)	112	Named in honour of Nicolaus Copernicus.			
Copernicium (Cn)	112	· Former names: eka-mercury, and temporarily systematic name and symbol ununbium (Uub, '112'): temporary systematic name and symbol.			
Nihonium (Nh)	113	日本 (Nihon)	Japanese	"Japan"	toponym
Nihonium (Nh)	113	Named after Nihon ("Japan"), where the element was discovered at the Riken research institute.			
Nihonium (Nh)	113	· Former names: eka-thallium, ununtrium (Uut, '113'): temporary systematic name and symbol.			
Flerovium (Fl)	114	Flerov, Georgy	Russian	Russian surname	eponym
Flerovium (Fl)	114	Named in honour of Georgy Flyorov, who was at the forefront of Soviet nuclear physics and founder of the Joint Institute for Nuclear Research in Dubna, Russia, where the element was discovered.			
Flerovium (Fl)	114	· Former name ununquadium (Uuq, '114'): temporary systematic name and symbol.			
Moscovium (Mc)	115	Moscovia	Latin	"Moscow"	toponym
Moscovium (Mc)	115	Named after Moscow Oblast, where the element was discovered.			
Moscovium (Mc)	115	· Former names: eka-bismuth, ununpentium (Uup, '115'): temporary systematic name and symbol.			
Livermorium (Lv)	116	Livermore	English		toponym
Livermorium (Lv)	116	Named in honour of the Lawrence Livermore National Laboratory, which collaborated in the discovery and is in Livermore, California, in turn named after the rancher Robert Livermore.			
Livermorium (Lv)	116	· Former name ununhexium (Uuh, '116'): temporary systematic name and symbol.			
Tennessine (Ts)	117	Tennessee	Cherokee via English		toponym
Tennessine (Ts)	117	Named after the US state of Tennessee, itself named after the Cherokee village of ᏔᎾᏏ (tanasi), where important work for one of the steps to synthesise the element was done in the Oak Ridge National Laboratory.			
Tennessine (Ts)	117	· Former names: eka-astatine, ununseptium (Uus, '117'): temporary systematic name and symbol.			
Oganesson (Og)	118	Oganessian, Yuri (Оганесян)	Russian	Armenian surname	eponym
Oganesson (Og)	118	Named after Yuri Oganessian, a great contributor to the field of synthesis of superheavy elements.			
Oganesson (Og)	118	· Former names: eka-radon, ununoctium (Uuo, '118'): temporary systematic name and symbol.			

== See also ==
- List of chemical element naming controversies
- Naming of elements
