= Bohrium =

Bohrium, _{107}Bh
Bohrium
- Pronunciation: /ˈbɔːriəm/ (BOR-ee-əm)
- Mass number: [270] (data not decisive) (Note: The most stable isotope of bohrium cannot be determined based on existing data due to uncertainty that arises from the low number of measurements. The half-life of ^{270}Bh corresponding to two standard deviations is, based on existing data, 2.4+8.8 −1.8 minutes, whereas that of ^{274}Bh is 44+68 −26 seconds; these measurements have overlapping confidence intervals. It is also possible that the unconfirmed ^{278}Bh is more stable than both of these, with its half-life being 11.5 minutes.)

Bohrium in the periodic table
Hydrogen																															Helium
Lithium	Beryllium																									Boron	Carbon	Nitrogen	Oxygen	Fluorine	Neon
Sodium	Magnesium																									Aluminium	Silicon	Phosphorus	Sulfur	Chlorine	Argon
Potassium	Calcium															Scandium	Titanium	Vanadium	Chromium	Manganese	Iron	Cobalt	Nickel	Copper	Zinc	Gallium	Germanium	Arsenic	Selenium	Bromine	Krypton
Rubidium	Strontium															Yttrium	Zirconium	Niobium	Molybdenum	Technetium	Ruthenium	Rhodium	Palladium	Silver	Cadmium	Indium	Tin	Antimony	Tellurium	Iodine	Xenon
Caesium	Barium	Lanthanum	Cerium	Praseodymium	Neodymium	Promethium	Samarium	Europium	Gadolinium	Terbium	Dysprosium	Holmium	Erbium	Thulium	Ytterbium	Lutetium	Hafnium	Tantalum	Tungsten	Rhenium	Osmium	Iridium	Platinum	Gold	Mercury (element)	Thallium	Lead	Bismuth	Polonium	Astatine	Radon
Francium	Radium	Actinium	Thorium	Protactinium	Uranium	Neptunium	Plutonium	Americium	Curium	Berkelium	Californium	Einsteinium	Fermium	Mendelevium	Nobelium	Lawrencium	Rutherfordium	Dubnium	Seaborgium	Bohrium	Hassium	Meitnerium	Darmstadtium	Roentgenium	Copernicium	Nihonium	Flerovium	Moscovium	Livermorium	Tennessine	Oganesson
Re
↑
Bh
↓
—
seaborgium ← bohrium → hassium
- Atomic number (Z): 107
- Group: group 7
- Period: period 7
- Block: d-block
- Electron configuration: [Rn] 5f^{14} 6d^{5} 7s^{2}
- Electrons per shell: 2, 8, 18, 32, 32, 13, 2

Physical properties
- Phase at STP: solid (predicted)
- Density (near r.t.): 26–27 g/cm^{3} (predicted)

Atomic properties
- Oxidation states: common: (none) +7 (+3), (+4), (+5), (+7)
- Ionization energies: 1st: 740 kJ/mol; 2nd: 1690 kJ/mol; 3rd: 2570 kJ/mol; (more) (all but first estimated)
- Atomic radius: empirical: 128 pm (predicted)
- Covalent radius: 141 pm (estimated)

Other properties
- Natural occurrence: synthetic
- Crystal structure: hexagonal close-packed (hcp) (predicted)
- CAS Number: 54037-14-8

History
- Naming: after Niels Bohr
- Discovery: Gesellschaft für Schwerionenforschung (1981)

Isotopes of bohrium
Main isotopes			Decay	
Isotope	abundance	half-life (t_{1/2})	mode	product
^{267}Bh	synth	17 s	α	^{263}Db
^{270}Bh	synth	2.4 min	α	^{266}Db
^{271}Bh	synth	2.9 s	α	^{267}Db
^{272}Bh	synth	8.8 s	α	^{268}Db
^{274}Bh	synth	57 s	α	^{270}Db
^{278}Bh	synth	11.5 min?	SF	–

Bohrium is a synthetic chemical element; it has symbol Bh and atomic number 107. It is named after Danish physicist Niels Bohr. As a synthetic element, it can be created in particle accelerators but is not found in nature. All known isotopes of bohrium are highly radioactive; the most stable known isotope is ^{270}Bh with a half-life of approximately 2.4 minutes, though the unconfirmed ^{278}Bh may have a longer half-life of about 11.5 minutes.

In the periodic table, it is a transactinide element in the d-block. It is a member of the 7th period and belongs to the group 7 elements as the fifth member of the 6d series of transition metals. Chemistry experiments have confirmed that bohrium behaves as the heavier homologue to rhenium in group 7. The chemical properties of bohrium are characterized only partly, but they compare well with the chemistry of the other group 7 elements.

== Superheavy elements ==
=== Synthesis of superheavy nuclei ===
A graphic depiction of a nuclear fusion reaction. Two nuclei fuse into one, emitting a neutron. Reactions that created new elements to this moment were similar, though varying numbers of neutrons – or alternatively charged particles – may be emitted instead.

A superheavy (Note: In nuclear physics, an element is called heavy if its atomic number is high; lead (element 82) is one example of such a heavy element. The term "superheavy elements" typically refers to elements with atomic number greater than 103 (although there are other definitions, such as atomic number greater than 100 or 112; sometimes, the term is presented an equivalent to the term "transactinide", which puts an upper limit before the beginning of the hypothetical superactinide series). Terms "heavy isotopes" (of a given element) and "heavy nuclei" mean what could be understood in the common language—isotopes of high mass (for the given element) and nuclei of high mass, respectively.) atomic nucleus is created in a nuclear reaction that combines two other nuclei of unequal size (Note: In 2009, a team at the JINR led by Oganessian published results of their attempt to create hassium in a symmetric ^{136}Xe + ^{136}Xe reaction. They failed to observe a single atom in such a reaction, putting the upper limit on the cross section, the measure of probability of a nuclear reaction, as 2.5 pb. In comparison, the reaction that resulted in hassium discovery, ^{208}Pb + ^{58}Fe, had a cross section of ~20 pb (more specifically, 19^{+19}_{-11} pb), as estimated by the discoverers.) into one; roughly, the more unequal the two nuclei in terms of mass, the greater the possibility that the two react. The material made of the heavier nuclei is made into a target, which is then bombarded by the beam of lighter nuclei. Two nuclei can only fuse into one if they are close enough to each other; normally, nuclei (all positively charged) repel each other due to electrostatic repulsion. The strong interaction can overcome this repulsion but only within a very short distance from a nucleus; beam nuclei are thus greatly accelerated in order to make such repulsion insignificant compared to the velocity of the beam nucleus. The energy applied to the beam nuclei to accelerate them can cause them to reach speeds as high as one-tenth of the speed of light. However, if too much energy is applied, the beam nucleus can fall apart.

Coming close enough alone is not enough for two nuclei to fuse: when two nuclei approach each other, they usually remain together for about 10^{−20} seconds and then part ways (not necessarily in the same composition as before the reaction) rather than form a single nucleus. This happens because during the attempted formation of a single nucleus, electrostatic repulsion tears apart the nucleus that is being formed. Each pair of a target and a beam is characterized by its cross section—the probability that fusion will occur if two nuclei approach one another expressed in terms of the transverse area that the incident particle must hit in order for the fusion to occur. (Note: The amount of energy applied to the beam particle to accelerate it can also influence the value of cross section. For example, in the ^{28}_{14}Si + ^{1}_{0}n → ^{28}_{13}Al + ^{1}_{1}p reaction, cross section changes smoothly from 370 mb at 12.3 MeV to 160 mb at 18.3 MeV, with a broad peak at 13.5 MeV with the maximum value of 380 mb.) This fusion may occur as a result of the quantum effect in which nuclei can tunnel through electrostatic repulsion. If the two nuclei can stay close past that phase, multiple nuclear interactions result in redistribution of energy and an energy equilibrium.

External videos
- Visualization of unsuccessful nuclear fusion, based on calculations from the Australian National University

The resulting merger is an excited state—termed a compound nucleus—and thus it is very unstable. To reach a more stable state, the temporary merger may fission without formation of a more stable nucleus. Alternatively, the compound nucleus may eject a few neutrons, which would carry away the excitation energy; if the latter is not sufficient for a neutron expulsion, the merger would produce a gamma ray. This happens in about 10^{−16} seconds after the initial nuclear collision and results in creation of a more stable nucleus. The definition by the IUPAC/IUPAP Joint Working Party (JWP) states that a chemical element can only be recognized as discovered if a nucleus of it exists for at least 10^{−14} seconds. This value was chosen as an estimate of how long it takes a nucleus to acquire electrons and thus display its chemical properties. (Note: This figure also marks the generally accepted upper limit for lifetime of a compound nucleus.)

=== Decay and detection ===
The beam passes through the target and reaches the next chamber, the separator; if a new nucleus is produced, it is carried with this beam. In the separator, the newly produced nucleus is separated from other nuclides (that of the original beam and any other reaction products) (Note: This separation is based on that the resulting nuclei move past the target more slowly then the unreacted beam nuclei. The separator contains electric and magnetic fields whose effects on a moving particle cancel out for a specific velocity of a particle. Such separation can also be aided by a time-of-flight measurement and a recoil energy measurement; a combination of the two may allow to estimate the mass of a nucleus.) and transferred to a surface-barrier detector, which stops the nucleus. The exact location of the upcoming impact on the detector is marked; also marked are its energy and the time of the arrival. The transfer takes about 10^{−6} seconds; in order to be detected, the nucleus must survive this long. The nucleus is recorded again once its decay is registered, and the location, the energy, and the time of the decay are measured.

Stability of a nucleus is provided by the strong interaction. However, its range is very short; as nuclei become larger, its influence on the outermost nucleons (protons and neutrons) weakens. At the same time, the nucleus is torn apart by electrostatic repulsion between protons, and its range is not limited. Total binding energy provided by the strong interaction increases linearly with the number of nucleons, whereas electrostatic repulsion increases with the square of the atomic number, i.e. the latter grows faster and becomes increasingly important for heavy and superheavy nuclei. Superheavy nuclei are thus theoretically predicted and have so far been observed to predominantly decay via decay modes that are caused by such repulsion: alpha decay and spontaneous fission. (Note: Not all decay modes are caused by electrostatic repulsion. For example, beta decay is caused by the weak interaction.) Almost all alpha emitters have over 210 nucleons, and the lightest nuclide primarily undergoing spontaneous fission has 238. In both decay modes, nuclei are inhibited from decaying by corresponding energy barriers for each mode, but they can be tunneled through.

Scheme of an apparatus for creation of superheavy elements, based on the Dubna Gas-Filled Recoil Separator set up in the Flerov Laboratory of Nuclear Reactions in JINR. The trajectory within the detector and the beam focusing apparatus changes because of a dipole magnet in the former and quadrupole magnets in the latter.

Alpha particles are commonly produced in radioactive decays because the mass of an alpha particle per nucleon is small enough to leave some energy for the alpha particle to be used as kinetic energy to leave the nucleus. Spontaneous fission is caused by electrostatic repulsion tearing the nucleus apart and produces various nuclei in different instances of identical nuclei fissioning. As the atomic number increases, spontaneous fission rapidly becomes more important: spontaneous fission partial half-lives decrease by 23 orders of magnitude from uranium (element 92) to nobelium (element 102), and by 30 orders of magnitude from thorium (element 90) to fermium (element 100). The earlier liquid drop model thus suggested that spontaneous fission would occur nearly instantly due to disappearance of the fission barrier for nuclei with about 280 nucleons. The later nuclear shell model suggested that nuclei with about 300 nucleons would form an island of stability in which nuclei will be more resistant to spontaneous fission and will primarily undergo alpha decay with longer half-lives. Subsequent discoveries suggested that the predicted island might be further than originally anticipated; they also showed that nuclei intermediate between the long-lived actinides and the predicted island are deformed, and gain additional stability from shell effects. Experiments on lighter superheavy nuclei, as well as those closer to the expected island, have shown greater than previously anticipated stability against spontaneous fission, showing the importance of shell effects on nuclei. (Note: It was already known by the 1960s that ground states of nuclei differed in energy and shape as well as that certain magic numbers of nucleons corresponded to greater stability of a nucleus. However, it was assumed that there was no nuclear structure in superheavy nuclei as they were too deformed to form one.)

Alpha decays are registered by the emitted alpha particles, and the decay products are easy to determine before the actual decay; if such a decay or a series of consecutive decays produces a known nucleus, the original product of a reaction can be easily determined. (Note: Since mass of a nucleus is not measured directly but is rather calculated from that of another nucleus, such measurement is called indirect. Direct measurements are also possible, but for the most part they have remained unavailable for superheavy nuclei. The first direct measurement of mass of a superheavy nucleus was reported in 2018 at LBNL. Mass was determined from the location of a nucleus after the transfer (the location helps determine its trajectory, which is linked to the mass-to-charge ratio of the nucleus, since the transfer was done in presence of a magnet).) (That all decays within a decay chain were indeed related to each other is established by the location of these decays, which must be in the same place.) The known nucleus can be recognized by the specific characteristics of decay it undergoes such as decay energy (or more specifically, the kinetic energy of the emitted particle). (Note: If the decay occurred in a vacuum, then since total momentum of an isolated system before and after the decay must be preserved, the daughter nucleus would also receive a small velocity. The ratio of the two velocities, and accordingly the ratio of the kinetic energies, would thus be inverse to the ratio of the two masses. The decay energy equals the sum of the known kinetic energy of the alpha particle and that of the daughter nucleus (an exact fraction of the former). The calculations hold for an experiment as well, but the difference is that the nucleus does not move after the decay because it is tied to the detector.) Spontaneous fission, however, produces various nuclei as products, so the original nuclide cannot be determined from its daughters. (Note: Spontaneous fission was discovered by Soviet physicist Georgy Flerov, a leading scientist at JINR, and thus it was a "hobbyhorse" for the facility. In contrast, the LBL scientists believed fission information was not sufficient for a claim of synthesis of an element. They believed spontaneous fission had not been studied enough to use it for identification of a new element, since there was a difficulty of establishing that a compound nucleus had only ejected neutrons and not charged particles like protons or alpha particles. They thus preferred to link new isotopes to the already known ones by successive alpha decays.)

The information available to physicists aiming to synthesize a superheavy element is thus the information collected at the detectors: location, energy, and time of arrival of a particle to the detector, and those of its decay. The physicists analyze this data and seek to conclude that it was indeed caused by a new element and could not have been caused by a different nuclide than the one claimed. Often, provided data is insufficient for a conclusion that a new element was definitely created and there is no other explanation for the observed effects; errors in interpreting data have been made. (Note: For instance, element 102 was mistakenly identified in 1957 at the Nobel Institute of Physics in Stockholm, Stockholm County, Sweden. There were no earlier definitive claims of creation of this element, and the element was assigned a name by its Swedish, American, and British discoverers, nobelium. It was later shown that the identification was incorrect. The following year, RL was unable to reproduce the Swedish results and announced instead their synthesis of the element; that claim was also disproved later. JINR insisted that they were the first to create the element and suggested a name of their own for the new element, joliotium; the Soviet name was also not accepted (JINR later referred to the naming of the element 102 as "hasty"). This name was proposed to IUPAC in a written response to their ruling on priority of discovery claims of elements, signed 29 September 1992. The name "nobelium" remained unchanged on account of its widespread usage.)

== History ==
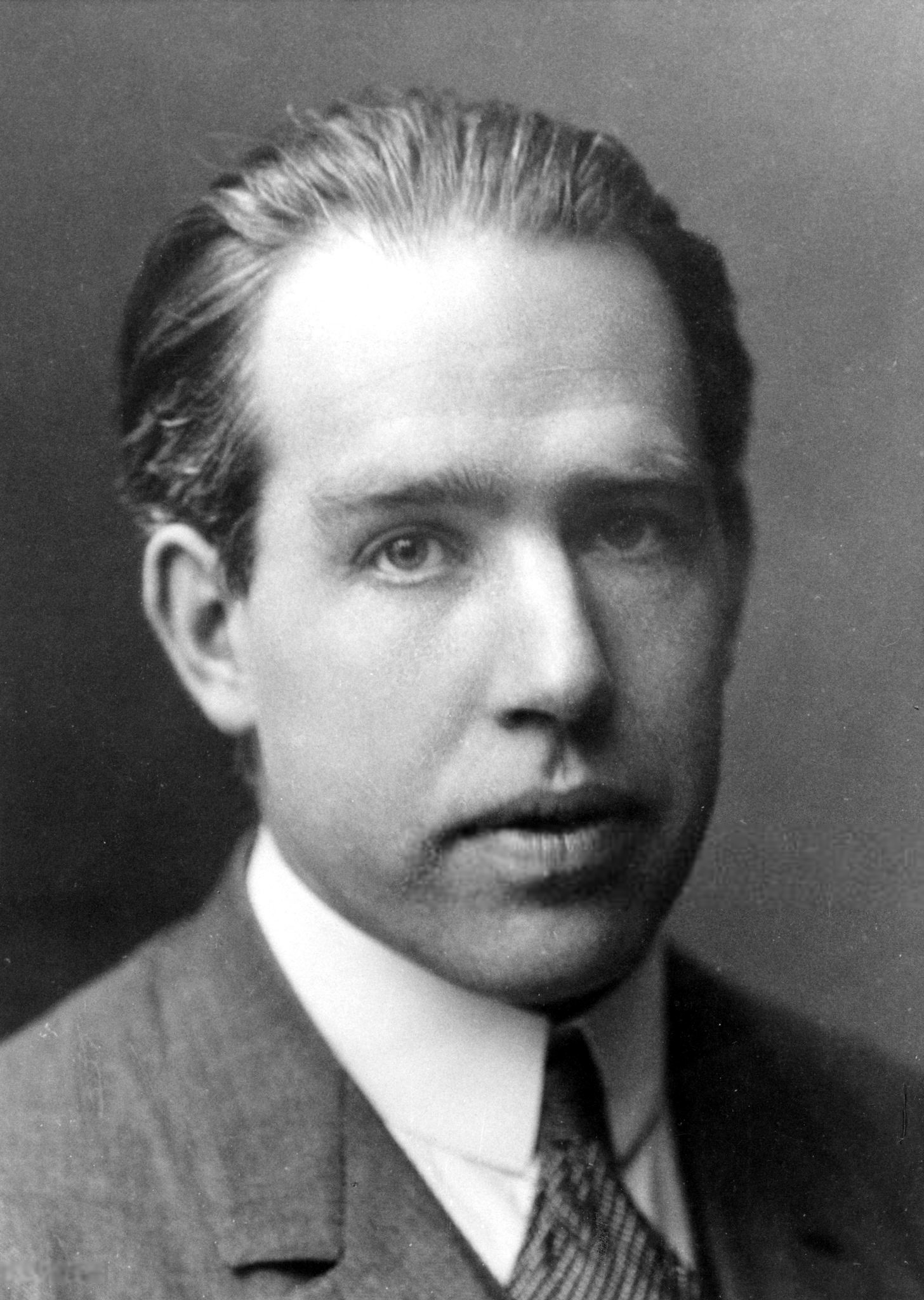
Element 107 was originally proposed to be named after Niels Bohr, a Danish nuclear/theoretical physicist, with the name nielsbohrium (Ns). This name was later changed by IUPAC to bohrium (Bh).

=== Discovery ===
Two groups claimed discovery of the element. Evidence of bohrium was first reported in 1976 by a Soviet research team led by Yuri Oganessian, in which targets of bismuth-209 and lead-208 were bombarded with accelerated nuclei of chromium-54 and manganese-55, respectively. Two activities, one with a half-life of one to two milliseconds, and the other with an approximately five-second half-life, were seen. Since the ratio of the intensities of these two activities was constant throughout the experiment, it was proposed that the first was from the isotope bohrium-261 and that the second was from its daughter dubnium-257. Later, the dubnium isotope was corrected to dubnium-258, which indeed has a five-second half-life (dubnium-257 has a one-second half-life); however, the half-life observed for its parent is much shorter than the half-lives later observed in the definitive discovery of bohrium at Darmstadt in 1981. The IUPAC/IUPAP Transfermium Working Group (TWG) concluded that while dubnium-258 was probably seen in this experiment, the evidence for the production of its parent bohrium-262 was not convincing enough.

In 1981, a German research team led by Peter Armbruster and Gottfried Münzenberg at the GSI Helmholtz Centre for Heavy Ion Research (GSI Helmholtzzentrum für Schwerionenforschung) in Darmstadt bombarded a target of bismuth-209 with accelerated nuclei of chromium-54 to produce 5 atoms of the isotope bohrium-262:

^{209}_{83}Bi + ^{54}_{24}Cr → ^{262}_{107}Bh + n

This discovery was further substantiated by their detailed measurements of the alpha decay chain of the produced bohrium atoms to previously known isotopes of fermium and californium. The IUPAC/IUPAP Transfermium Working Group (TWG) recognised the GSI collaboration as official discoverers in their 1992 report.

=== Proposed names ===
In September 1992, the German group suggested the name nielsbohrium with symbol Ns to honor the Danish physicist Niels Bohr. The Soviet scientists at the Joint Institute for Nuclear Research in Dubna, Russia had suggested this name be given to element 105 (which was finally called dubnium) and the German team wished to recognise both Bohr and the fact that the Dubna team had been the first to propose the cold fusion reaction, and simultaneously help to solve the controversial problem of the naming of element 105. The Dubna team agreed with the German group's naming proposal for element 107.

There was an element naming controversy as to what the elements from 104 to 106 were to be called; the IUPAC adopted unnilseptium (symbol Uns) as a temporary, systematic element name for this element. In 1994 a committee of IUPAC recommended that element 107 be named bohrium, not nielsbohrium, since there was no precedent for using a scientist's complete name in the naming of an element. This was opposed by the discoverers as there was some concern that the name might be confused with boron and in particular the distinguishing of the names of their respective oxyanions, bohrate and borate. The matter was handed to the Danish branch of IUPAC which, despite this, voted in favour of the name bohrium, and thus the name bohrium for element 107 was recognized internationally in 1997; the names of the respective oxyanions of boron and bohrium remain unchanged despite their homophony.

== Isotopes ==
List of bohrium isotopes
Isotope	Half-life (Note: Different sources give different values for half-lives; the most recently published values are listed.)		Decay mode	Discovery year	Discovery reaction
Isotope	Value	ref	Decay mode	Discovery year	Discovery reaction
^{260}Bh	41 ms		α	2008	^{209}Bi(^{52}Cr,n)
^{261}Bh	12.8 ms		α	1989	^{209}Bi(^{54}Cr,2n)
^{262}Bh	84 ms		α	1981	^{209}Bi(^{54}Cr,n)
^{262m}Bh	9.5 ms		α	1981	^{209}Bi(^{54}Cr,n)
^{264}Bh	1.07 s		α	1995	^{272}Rg(—,2α)
^{265}Bh	1.19 s		α	2004	^{243}Am(^{26}Mg,4n)
^{266}Bh	10.6 s		α	2000	^{249}Bk(^{22}Ne,5n)
^{267}Bh	22 s		α	2000	^{249}Bk(^{22}Ne,4n)
^{270}Bh	2.4 min		α	2007	^{282}Nh(—,3α)
^{271}Bh	2.9 s		α	2013	^{287}Mc(—,4α)
^{272}Bh	8.8 s		α	2004	^{288}Mc(—,4α)
^{274}Bh	57 s		α	2010	^{294}Ts(—,5α)
^{278}Bh	11.5 min?		SF	(2016)	^{290}Fl(e^{−},ν_{e}3α)?

Bohrium has no stable or naturally occurring isotopes. Several radioactive isotopes have been synthesized in the laboratory, either by fusing two atoms or by observing the decay of heavier elements. Twelve different isotopes of bohrium have been reported with atomic masses 260–262, 264–267, 270–272, 274, and 278, one of which, bohrium-262, has a known metastable state. All of these but the unconfirmed ^{278}Bh decay only through alpha decay, although some unknown bohrium isotopes are predicted to undergo spontaneous fission.

The lighter isotopes usually have shorter half-lives; half-lives of under 100 ms for ^{260}Bh, ^{261}Bh, ^{262}Bh, and ^{262m}Bh were observed. ^{264}Bh, ^{265}Bh, ^{266}Bh, and ^{271}Bh are more stable at around 1 s, and ^{267}Bh and ^{272}Bh have half-lives of about 10 s. The heaviest isotopes are the most stable, with ^{270}Bh and ^{274}Bh having measured half-lives of about 2.4 min and 40 s respectively, and the even heavier unconfirmed isotope ^{278}Bh appearing to have an even longer half-life of about 11.5 minutes.

The most proton-rich isotopes with masses 260, 261, and 262 were directly produced by cold fusion, those with mass 262 and 264 were reported in the decay chains of meitnerium and roentgenium, while the neutron-rich isotopes with masses 265, 266, 267 were created in irradiations of actinide targets. The five most neutron-rich ones with masses 270, 271, 272, 274, and 278 (unconfirmed) appear in the decay chains of ^{282}Nh, ^{287}Mc, ^{288}Mc, ^{294}Ts, and ^{290}Fl respectively. The half-lives of bohrium isotopes range from about ten milliseconds for ^{262m}Bh to about one minute for ^{270}Bh and ^{274}Bh, extending to about 11.5 minutes for the unconfirmed ^{278}Bh, which may have one of the longest half-lives among reported superheavy nuclides.

== Predicted properties ==
Very few properties of bohrium or its compounds have been measured; this is due to its extremely limited and expensive production and the fact that bohrium (and its parents) decays very quickly. A few singular chemistry-related properties have been measured, but properties of bohrium metal remain unknown and only predictions are available.

=== Chemical ===
Bohrium is the fifth member of the 6d series of transition metals and the heaviest member of group 7 in the periodic table, below manganese, technetium and rhenium. All the members of the group readily portray their group oxidation state of +7 and the state becomes more stable as the group is descended. Thus bohrium is expected to form a stable +7 state. Technetium also shows a stable +4 state whilst rhenium exhibits stable +4 and +3 states. Bohrium may therefore show these lower states as well. The higher +7 oxidation state is more likely to exist in oxyanions, such as perbohrate, BhO^{−}_{4}, analogous to the lighter permanganate, pertechnetate, and perrhenate. Nevertheless, bohrium(VII) is likely to be unstable in aqueous solution, and would probably be easily reduced to the more stable bohrium(IV).

The lighter group 7 elements are known to form volatile heptoxides M_{2}O_{7} (M = Mn, Tc, Re), so bohrium should also form the volatile oxide Bh_{2}O_{7}. The oxide should dissolve in water to form perbohric acid, HBhO_{4}. Rhenium and technetium form a range of oxyhalides from the halogenation of the oxide. The chlorination of the oxide forms the oxychlorides MO_{3}Cl, so BhO_{3}Cl should be formed in this reaction. Fluorination results in MO_{3}F and MO_{2}F_{3} for the heavier elements in addition to the rhenium compounds ReOF_{5} and ReF_{7}. Therefore, oxyfluoride formation for bohrium may help to indicate eka-rhenium properties. Since the oxychlorides are asymmetrical, and they should have increasingly large electric dipole moments going down the group, they should become less volatile in the order TcO_{3}Cl > ReO_{3}Cl > BhO_{3}Cl: this was experimentally confirmed in 2000 by measuring the enthalpies of adsorption of these three compounds. The values are for TcO_{3}Cl and ReO_{3}Cl are −51 kJ/mol and −61 kJ/mol respectively; the experimental value for BhO_{3}Cl is −77.8 kJ/mol, very close to the theoretically expected value of −78.5 kJ/mol.

=== Physical and atomic ===
Bohrium is expected to be a solid under normal conditions and assume a hexagonal close-packed crystal structure (^{c}/_{a} = 1.62), similar to its lighter congener rhenium. Early predictions by Fricke estimated its density at 37.1 g/cm^{3}, but newer calculations predict a somewhat lower value of 26–27 g/cm^{3}.

The atomic radius of bohrium is expected to be around 128 pm. Due to the relativistic stabilization of the 7s orbital and destabilization of the 6d orbital, the Bh^{+} ion is predicted to have an electron configuration of [Rn] 5f^{14} 6d^{4} 7s^{2}, giving up a 6d electron instead of a 7s electron, which is the opposite of the behavior of its lighter homologues manganese and technetium. Rhenium, on the other hand, follows its heavier congener bohrium in giving up a 5d electron before a 6s electron, as relativistic effects have become significant by the sixth period, where they cause among other things the yellow color of gold and the low melting point of mercury. The Bh^{2+} ion is expected to have an electron configuration of [Rn] 5f^{14} 6d^{3} 7s^{2}; in contrast, the Re^{2+} ion is expected to have a [Xe] 4f^{14} 5d^{5} configuration, this time analogous to manganese and technetium. The ionic radius of hexacoordinate heptavalent bohrium is expected to be 58 pm (heptavalent manganese, technetium, and rhenium having values of 46, 57, and 53 pm respectively). Pentavalent bohrium should have a larger ionic radius of 83 pm.

== Experimental chemistry ==
In 1995, the first report on attempted isolation of the element was unsuccessful, prompting new theoretical studies to investigate how best to investigate bohrium (using its lighter homologs technetium and rhenium for comparison) and removing unwanted contaminating elements such as the trivalent actinides, the group 5 elements, and polonium.

In 2000, it was confirmed that although relativistic effects are important, bohrium behaves like a typical group 7 element. A team at the Paul Scherrer Institute (PSI) conducted a chemistry reaction using six atoms of ^{267}Bh produced in the reaction between ^{249}Bk and ^{22}Ne ions. The resulting atoms were thermalised and reacted with a HCl/O_{2} mixture to form a volatile oxychloride. The reaction also produced isotopes of its lighter homologues, technetium (as ^{108}Tc) and rhenium (as ^{169}Re). The isothermal adsorption curves were measured and gave strong evidence for the formation of a volatile oxychloride with properties similar to that of rhenium oxychloride. This placed bohrium as a typical member of group 7. The adsorption enthalpies of the oxychlorides of technetium, rhenium, and bohrium were measured in this experiment, agreeing very well with the theoretical predictions and implying a sequence of decreasing oxychloride volatility down group 7 of TcO_{3}Cl > ReO_{3}Cl > BhO_{3}Cl.

2 Bh + 3 O_{2} + 2 HCl → 2 BhO_{3}Cl + H_{2}

The longer-lived heavy isotopes of bohrium, produced as the daughters of heavier elements, offer advantages for future radiochemical experiments. Although the heavy isotope ^{274}Bh requires a rare and highly radioactive berkelium target for its production, the isotopes ^{272}Bh, ^{271}Bh, and ^{270}Bh can be readily produced as daughters of more easily produced moscovium and nihonium isotopes.

== Bibliography ==
- Audi, G.; Kondev, F. G.; Wang, M.; et al. (2017). "The NUBASE2016 evaluation of nuclear properties". Chinese Physics C. 41 (3) 030001. Bibcode:2017ChPhC..41c0001A. doi:10.1088/1674-1137/41/3/030001.
- Beiser, A. (2003). Concepts of modern physics (6th ed.). McGraw-Hill. ISBN 978-0-07-244848-1. OCLC 48965418.
- Hoffman, D. C.; Ghiorso, A.; Seaborg, G. T. (2000). The Transuranium People: The Inside Story. World Scientific. ISBN 978-1-78-326244-1.
- Kragh, H. (2018). From Transuranic to Superheavy Elements: A Story of Dispute and Creation. Springer. ISBN 978-3-319-75813-8.
- Zagrebaev, V.; Karpov, A.; Greiner, W. (2013). "Future of superheavy element research: Which nuclei could be synthesized within the next few years?". Journal of Physics: Conference Series. 420 (1) 012001. arXiv:1207.5700. Bibcode:2013JPhCS.420a2001Z. doi:10.1088/1742-6596/420/1/012001. ISSN 1742-6588. S2CID 55434734.
