= Systematic element name =

Temporary name assigned to predicted chemical elements

A systematic element name is the temporary name assigned to an unknown or recently synthesized chemical element. A systematic symbol is also derived from this name.

In chemistry, a transuranic element receives a permanent name and symbol only after its synthesis has been confirmed. In some cases, such as the Transfermium Wars, controversies over the formal name and symbol have been protracted and highly political. In order to discuss such elements without ambiguity, the International Union of Pure and Applied Chemistry (IUPAC) uses a set of rules, adopted in 1978, to assign a temporary systematic name and symbol to each such element. This approach to naming originated in the successful development of regular rules for the naming of organic compounds.

== IUPAC rules ==
The temporary names derive systematically from the element's atomic number, and apply only to 101 ≤ Z ≤ 999. Each digit is translated into a "numerical root" according to the table. The roots are concatenated, and the name is completed by the suffix -ium. Some of the roots are Latin and others are Greek, to avoid two digits starting with the same letter (for example, the Greek-derived pent is used instead of the Latin-derived quint to avoid confusion with quad for 4). There are two elision rules designed to prevent odd-looking names.

Traditionally the suffix -ium was used only for metals (or at least elements that were expected to be metallic), and other elements used different suffixes: halogens used -ine and noble gases used -on instead. However, the systematic names use -ium for all elements regardless of group. Thus, elements 117 and 118 were ununseptium and ununoctium, not ununseptine and ununocton. This does not apply to the trivial names these elements receive once confirmed; thus, elements 117 and 118 are now tennessine and oganesson, respectively. For these trivial names, all elements receive the suffix -ium except those in group 17, which receive -ine (like the halogens), and those in group 18, which receive -on (like the noble gases). (That being said, tennessine and oganesson are expected to behave quite differently from their lighter congeners.)

The systematic symbol is formed by taking the first letter of each root, converting the first to uppercase. This results in three-letter symbols instead of the one- or two-letter symbols used for named elements. The rationale is that any scheme producing two-letter symbols will have to deviate from full systematicity to avoid collisions with the symbols of the permanently named elements.

The Recommendations for the Naming of Elements of Atomic Numbers Greater than 100 can be found here.

Digit	Root	Etymology	Symbol	Pronunciation	Example
0	nil	Latin nihil ("zero")	n	/nɪl/	unbinilium
1	un	Latin unus ("one")	u	/uːn/	unbiunium
2	bi	Latin bis ("twice")	b	/baɪ/	unbibium
3	tri	Latin tres ("three"); Greek tria ("three")	t	/traɪ/	unbitrium
4	quad	Latin quattuor ("four")	q	/kwɒd/	unbiquadium
5	pent	Greek pente ("five")	p	/pɛnt/	unbipentium
6	hex	Greek hex ("six")	h	/hɛks/	unbihexium
7	sept	Latin septem ("seven")	s	/sɛpt/	unbiseptium
8	oct	Latin octo ("eight"); Greek okto ("eight")	o	/ɒkt/	unbioctium
9	en(n)	Greek ennea ("nine")	e	/ɛn/	unbiennium
Suffix	-(i)um	Latin -um (neuter singular)	none	/-iəm/	
If bi or tri is followed by the ending -ium (i.e. the last digit is 2 or 3), the result is -bium or -trium, not -biium or -triium.; Example 1: element 122: unbibium (Ubb) Example 2: element 123: unbitrium (Ubt): If enn is followed by nil (i.e. the sequence -90- occurs), the result is -ennil-, not -ennnil-.; Example 3: element 190: unennilium (Uen)

As of 2019, all 118 discovered elements have received individual permanent names and symbols. Therefore, systematic names and symbols are now used only for the undiscovered elements beyond element 118, oganesson. When such an element is discovered, it will keep its systematic name and symbol until its discovery meets the criteria of and is accepted by the IUPAC/IUPAP Joint Working Party, upon which the discoverers are invited to propose a permanent name and symbol. Once this name and symbol is proposed, there is still a comment period before they become official and replace the systematic name and symbol.

At the time the systematic names were recommended (1978), names had already been officially given to all elements up to atomic number 103, lawrencium. While systematic names were given for elements 101 (mendelevium), 102 (nobelium), and 103 (lawrencium), these were only as "minor alternatives to the trivial names already approved by IUPAC". The following elements for some time only had systematic names as approved names, until their final replacement with trivial names after their discoveries were accepted.

Z	Systematic		Formal		Year	
	Symbol	Name	Symbol	Name	Undisputed synthesis first published	Named
104	Unq	Unnilquadium	Rf	Rutherfordium	1969	1997
105	Unp	Unnilpentium	Db	Dubnium	1970	1997
106	Unh	Unnilhexium	Sg	Seaborgium	1974	1997
107	Uns	Unnilseptium	Bh	Bohrium	1981	1997
108	Uno	Unniloctium	Hs	Hassium	1984	1997
109	Une	Unnilennium	Mt	Meitnerium	1982	1997
110	Uun	Ununnilium	Ds	Darmstadtium	1995	2003
111	Uuu	Unununium	Rg	Roentgenium	1995	2004
112	Uub	Ununbium	Cn	Copernicium	1996	2010
113	Uut	Ununtrium	Nh	Nihonium	2004	2016
114	Uuq	Ununquadium	Fl	Flerovium	1999	2012
115	Uup	Ununpentium	Mc	Moscovium	2004	2016
116	Uuh	Ununhexium	Lv	Livermorium	2000	2012
117	Uus	Ununseptium	Ts	Tennessine	2010	2016
118	Uuo	Ununoctium	Og	Oganesson	2006	2016

== See also ==
- Mendeleev's predicted elements – a much earlier (1869) system of naming undiscovered elements
