= Neutron cross section =

Measure of neutron interaction likelihood

Graph of cross-section over energy: cross-sections for H and C neutrons. H is a smooth curve; C is a very irregular pattern of spikes and dips.

In nuclear physics, the concept of a neutron cross section is used to express the likelihood of interaction between an incident neutron and a target nucleus. The neutron cross section σ can be defined as the area for which the number of neutron-nuclei reactions taking place is equal to the product of the number of incident neutrons that would pass through the area and the number of target nuclei. In conjunction with the neutron flux, it enables the calculation of the reaction rate, for example to derive the thermal power of a nuclear power plant. The standard unit for measuring the cross section is the barn, which is equal to 10^{−28} m^{2} or 10^{−24} cm^{2}. The larger the neutron cross section, the more likely a neutron will react with the nucleus.

An isotope (or nuclide) can be classified according to its neutron cross section and how it reacts to an incident neutron. Nuclides that tend to absorb a neutron and either decay or keep the neutron in its nucleus are neutron absorbers and will have a capture cross section for that reaction. Isotopes that undergo fission are fissionable fuels and have a corresponding fission cross section. The remaining isotopes will simply scatter the neutron, and have a scatter cross section. Some isotopes, like uranium-238, have nonzero cross sections of all three.

Isotopes which have a large scatter cross section and a low mass are good neutron moderators (see chart below). Nuclides which have a large absorption cross section are neutron poisons if they are neither fissile nor undergo decay. A poison that is purposely inserted into a nuclear reactor for controlling its reactivity in the long term and improve its shutdown margin is called a burnable poison.

== Parameters of interest ==
The neutron cross section, and therefore the probability of a neutron–nucleus interaction, depends on:

- the target type (hydrogen, uranium...),
- the type of nuclear reaction (scattering, fission...).
- the incident particle energy, also called speed or temperature (thermal, fast...),

and, to a lesser extent, of:

- its relative angle between the incident neutron and the target nuclide,
- the target nuclide temperature.

=== Target type dependence ===
The neutron cross section is defined for a given type of target particle. For example, the capture cross section of deuterium ^{2}H is much smaller than that of common hydrogen ^{1}H. This is the reason why some reactors use heavy water (in which most of the hydrogen is deuterium) instead of ordinary light water as moderator: fewer neutrons are lost by capture inside the medium, hence enabling the use of natural uranium instead of enriched uranium. This is the principle of a CANDU reactor.

=== Type of reaction dependence ===
The likelihood of interaction between an incident neutron and a target nuclide, independent of the type of reaction, is expressed with the help of the total cross section σ_{T}. However, it may be useful to know if the incoming particle bounces off the target (and therefore continue travelling after the interaction) or disappears after the reaction. For that reason, the scattering and absorption cross sections σ_{S} and σ_{A} are defined and the total cross section is simply the sum of the two partial cross sections:

$$\sigma_\text{T} = \sigma_\text{S} + \sigma_\text{A}$$

==== Absorption cross section ====
If the neutron is absorbed when approaching the nuclide, the atomic nucleus moves up on the table of isotopes by one position. For instance, ^{235}U becomes ^{236*}U with the * indicating the nucleus is highly energized. This energy has to be released and the release can take place through any of several mechanisms.

1. The simplest way for the release to occur is for the neutron to be ejected by the nucleus. If the neutron is emitted immediately, it acts the same as in other scattering events.
2. The nucleus may emit gamma radiation.
3. The nucleus may β^{−} decay, where a neutron is converted into a proton, an electron and an electron-type antineutrino (the antiparticle of the neutrino)
4. About 81% of the ^{236*}U nuclei are so energized that they undergo fission, releasing the energy as kinetic motion of the fission fragments, also emitting between one and five free neutrons.
- Nuclei that undergo fission as their predominant decay method after neutron capture include ^{233}U, ^{235}U, ^{237}U, ^{239}Pu, ^{241}Pu.
- Nuclei that predominantly absorb neutrons and then emit beta particle radiation lead to these isotopes, e.g., ^{232}Th absorbs a neutron and becomes ^{233*}Th, which beta decays to become ^{233}Pa, which in turn beta decays to become ^{233}U.
- Isotopes that undergo beta decay transmute from one element to another element. Those that undergo gamma or X-ray emission do not cause a change in element or isotope.

==== Scattering cross section ====
The scattering cross section can be further subdivided into coherent scattering and incoherent scattering, which is caused by the spin dependence of the scattering cross section and, for a natural sample, presence of different isotopes of the same element in the sample.

Because neutrons interact with the nuclear potential, the scattering cross section varies for different isotopes of the element in question. A very prominent example is hydrogen and its isotope deuterium. The total cross section for hydrogen is over 10 times that of deuterium, mostly due to the large incoherent scattering length of hydrogen. Some metals are rather transparent to neutrons, aluminum and zirconium being the two best examples of this.

=== Incident particle energy dependence ===
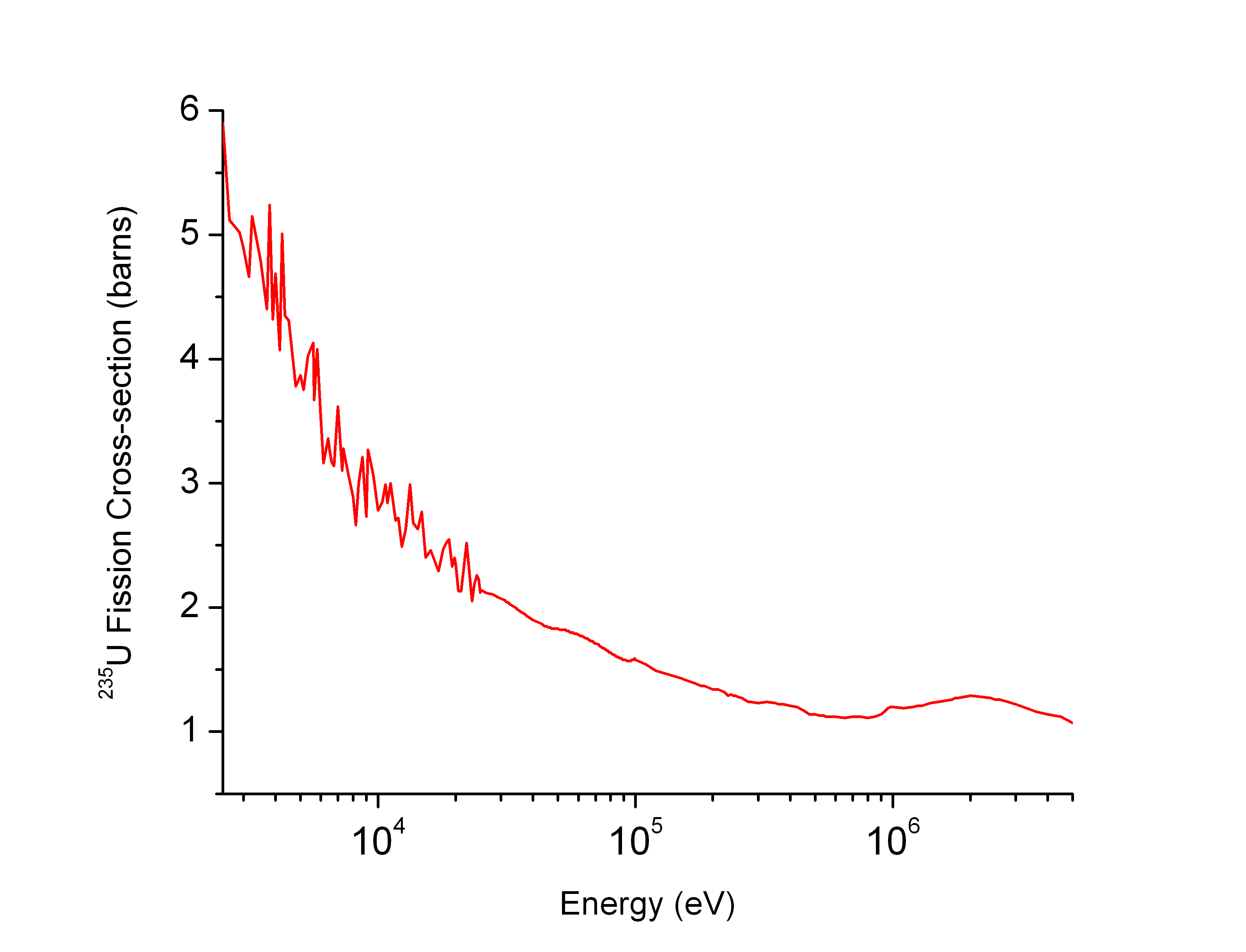
^{235}U fission cross section

For a given target and reaction, the cross section is strongly dependent on the neutron speed. In the extreme case, the cross section can be, at low energies, either zero (the energy for which the cross section becomes significant is called threshold energy) or much larger than at high energies.

Therefore, a cross section should be defined either at a given energy or should be averaged in an energy range (or group).

As an example, the plot on the right shows that the fission cross section of uranium-235 is low at high neutron energies but becomes higher at low energies. Such physical constraints explain why most operational nuclear reactors use a neutron moderator to reduce the energy of the neutron and thus increase the probability of fission which is essential to produce energy and sustain the chain reaction.

A simple estimation of energy dependence of any kind of cross section is provided by the Ramsauer model, which is based on the idea that the effective size of a neutron is proportional to the breadth of the probability density function of where the neutron is likely to be, which itself is proportional to the neutron's thermal de Broglie wavelength.

$$\lambda(E) = \frac {h} {\sqrt{2mE}}$$

Taking $\lambda$ as the effective radius of the neutron, we can estimate the area of the circle $\sigma$ in which neutrons hit the nuclei of effective radius $R$ as

$$\sigma(E) \propto \pi(R + \lambda(E))^2$$

While the assumptions of this model are naive, it explains at least qualitatively the typical measured energy dependence of the neutron absorption cross section. For neutrons of wavelength much larger than typical radius of atomic nuclei (1–10 fm, E = 10–1000 keV) $R$ can be neglected. For these low energy neutrons (such as thermal neutrons) the cross section $\sigma(E)$ is inversely proportional to neutron velocity.

This explains the advantage of using a neutron moderator in fission nuclear reactors. On the other hand, for very high energy neutrons (over 1 MeV), $\lambda$ can be neglected, and the neutron cross section is approximately constant, determined just by the cross section of atomic nuclei.

However, this simple model does not take into account so called neutron resonances, which strongly modify the neutron cross section in the energy range of 1 eV–10 keV, nor the threshold energy of some nuclear reactions.

=== Target temperature dependence ===
Cross sections are usually measured at 20 °C. To account for the dependence with temperature of the medium (viz. the target), the following formula is used:

$$\sigma = \sigma_0 \left(\frac{T_0}{T}\right)^\frac{1}{2},$$

where σ is the cross section at temperature T, and σ_{0} the cross section at temperature T_{0} (T and T_{0} in kelvins).

The energy is defined at the most likely energy and velocity of the neutron. The neutron population consists of a Maxwellian distribution, and hence the mean energy and velocity will be higher. Consequently, also a Maxwellian correction-term 1/2√π has to be included when calculating the cross section Equation 38.

=== Doppler broadening ===
The Doppler broadening of neutron resonances is a very important phenomenon and improves nuclear reactor stability. The prompt temperature coefficient of most thermal reactors is negative, owing to the nuclear Doppler effect. Nuclei are located in atoms which are themselves in continual motion owing to their thermal energy (temperature). As a result of these thermal motions, neutrons impinging on a target appears to the nuclei in the target to have a continuous spread in energy. This, in turn, has an effect on the observed shape of resonance. The resonance becomes shorter and wider than when the nuclei are at rest.

Although the shape of resonances changes with temperature, the total area under the resonance remains essentially constant. But this does not imply constant neutron absorption. Despite the constant area under resonance a resonance integral, which determines the absorption, increases with increasing target temperature. This, of course, decreases coefficient k (negative reactivity is inserted).

== Link to reaction rate and interpretation ==
Interpretation of the reaction rate with the help of the cross section

Imagine a spherical target (shown as the dashed grey and red circle in the figure) and a beam of particles (in blue) "flying" at speed v (vector in blue) in the direction of the target. We want to know how many particles impact it during time interval dt. To achieve it, the particles have to be in the green cylinder in the figure (volume V). The base of the cylinder is the geometrical cross section of the target perpendicular to the beam (surface σ in red) and its height the length travelled by the particles during dt (length v dt):

$$V = \sigma \, v \, dt$$

Noting n the number of particles per unit volume, there are n V particles in the volume V, which will, per definition of V, undergo a reaction. Noting r the reaction rate onto one target, it gives:

$$r \, dt = n \, V = n \, \sigma \, v \, dt$$

It follows directly from the definition of the neutron flux $\Phi$ = n v:

$$r = \sigma \, \Phi$$

Assuming that there is not one but N targets per unit volume, the reaction rate R per unit volume is:

$$R = N \, r = N \, \Phi \, \sigma$$

Knowing that the typical nuclear radius r is of the order of 10^{−12} cm, the expected nuclear cross section is of the order of π r^{2} or roughly 10^{−24} cm^{2} (thus justifying the definition of the barn). However, if measured experimentally ( σ = R / (Φ N) ), the experimental cross sections vary enormously. As an example, for slow neutrons absorbed by the (n, γ) reaction the cross section in some cases (xenon-135) is as much as 2,650,000 barns, while the cross sections for transmutations by gamma-ray absorption are in the neighborhood of 0.001 barn (§ Typical cross sections has more examples).

The so-called nuclear cross section is consequently a purely conceptual quantity representing how big the nucleus should be to be consistent with this simple mechanical model.

== Continuous versus average cross section ==
Cross sections depend strongly on the incoming particle speed. In the case of a beam with multiple particle speeds, the reaction rate R is integrated over the whole range of energy:

$$R = \int_E N \, \Phi (E) \, \sigma (E) \, dE$$

Where σ(E) is the continuous cross section, Φ(E) the differential flux and N the target atom number.

In order to obtain a formulation equivalent to the mono energetic case, an average cross section is defined:

$$\sigma = \frac{\int_E \Phi (E) \, \sigma (E) \, dE }{\int_E \Phi (E) \, dE} = \frac{\int_E \Phi (E) \, \sigma (E) \, dE}{\Phi}$$

Where Φ = $\int$ Φ(E) dE is the integral flux.

Using the definition of the integral flux Φ and the average cross section σ, the same formulation as before is found:

$$R = N \, \Phi \, \sigma$$

== Microscopic versus macroscopic cross section ==
Up to now, the cross section referred to in this article corresponds to the microscopic cross section σ. However, it is possible to define the macroscopic cross section Σ which corresponds to the total "equivalent area" of all target particles per unit volume:

$$\Sigma = N \, \sigma$$

where N is the atomic density of the target.

Therefore, since the cross section can be expressed in cm^{2} and the density in cm^{−3}, the macroscopic cross section is usually expressed in cm^{−1}. Using the equation derived above, the reaction rate R can be derived using only the neutron flux Φ and the macroscopic cross section Σ:

$$R = \Sigma \, \Phi$$

== Mean free path ==
Schematic of the exponential attenuation of an uncollided neutron beam in a slab of thickness X

The mean free path λ of a random particle is the average length between two interactions. The total length L that non perturbed particles travel during a time interval dt in a volume dV is simply the product of the length l covered by each particle during this time with the number of particles N in this volume:

$$L = l \, N$$

Noting v the speed of the particles and n is the number of particles per unit volume:

$$\begin{align}
l &= v \, dt \\
N &= n \, dV
\end{align}$$

It follows:

$$L = v \, dt \, n \, dV$$

Using the definition of the neutron flux Φ

$$\Phi = n \, v$$

It follows:

$$L = \Phi \, dt \, dV$$

This average length L is however valid only for unperturbed particles. To account for the interactions, L is divided by the total number of reactions R to obtain the average length between each collision λ:

$$\lambda = \frac{L}{R} = \frac{\Phi \, dt \, dV}{R}$$

From § Microscopic versus macroscopic cross section, the number of reactions during dt in the volume dV is:

$$R = \Phi \, \Sigma \, dt \, dV$$

It follows:

$$\lambda = \frac{L}{R} = \frac{\Phi \, dt \, dV}{\Phi \, \Sigma \, dt \, dV} = \frac{1}{\Sigma}$$

where λ is the mean free path and Σ is the macroscopic cross section.

Each interaction (scattering or absorption) removes a neutron from the uncollided beam, so a beam that enters matter with intensity $I_0$ is attenuated exponentially with depth x:

$$I(x) = I_0 e^{-\Sigma x}$$

where Σ is the macroscopic total cross section. The ratio $I(x)/I_0$ is the probability that a neutron travels the distance x without a collision, and the probability density of a first collision at depth x is $p(x)\,dx = \Sigma e^{-\Sigma x}\,dx.$ At a depth of one mean free path, the uncollided intensity has fallen to $I_0/e.$ With a collimated beam and detector, only the uncollided neutrons transmitted through a slab of thickness X are measured, so the measured transmission $I(X)/I_0$ directly yields the total cross section.

== Within stars ==
Because ^{8}Li and ^{12}Be form natural stopping points on the table of isotopes for hydrogen fusion, it is believed that all of the higher elements are formed in very hot stars where higher orders of fusion predominate. A star like the Sun produces energy by the fusion of simple ^{1}H into ^{4}He through a series of reactions. It is believed that when the inner core exhausts its ^{1}H fuel, the Sun will contract, slightly increasing its core temperature until ^{4}He can fuse and become the main fuel supply. Pure ^{4}He fusion leads to ^{8}Be, which decays back to 2 ^{4}He; therefore the ^{4}He must fuse with isotopes either more or less massive than itself to result in an energy producing reaction. When ^{4}He fuses with ^{2}H or ^{3}H, it forms stable isotopes ^{6}Li and ^{7}Li respectively. The higher order isotopes between ^{8}Li and ^{12}C are synthesized by similar reactions between hydrogen, helium, and lithium isotopes.

== Typical cross sections ==
Scattering (full line) and absorption (dotted) crossections of light elements commonly used as neutron moderators, reflectors and absorbers, the data was obtained from database NEA N ENDF/B-VII.1 using JANIS software and plotted using matplotlib.

Some cross sections that are of importance in a nuclear reactor are given in the following table.

- The thermal cross section is averaged using a Maxwellian spectrum.
- The fast cross section is averaged using the uranium-235 fission spectrum.

The cross sections were taken from the JEFF-3.1.1 library using JANIS software and JENDL-4.0.

| Nucleon | | Thermal cross section (barn) | | | Fast cross section (barn) | | |
| Nucleon | | Scattering | Capture | Fission | Scattering | Capture | Fission |
|---|---|---|---|---|---|---|---|
| Moderator | ^{1}H | 20 | 0.2 | - | 4 | 0.00004 | - |
| Moderator | ^{2}H | 4 | 0.0003 | - | 3 | 0.000007 | - |
| Moderator | ^{12}C | 5 | 0.002 | - | 2 | 0.00001 | - |
| Structural materials, others | ^{197}Au | 8.2 | 98.7 | - | 4 | 0.08 | - |
| Structural materials, others | ^{90}Zr | 5 | 0.006 | - | 5 | 0.006 | - |
| Structural materials, others | ^{56}Fe | 10 | 2 | - | 20 | 0.003 | - |
| Structural materials, others | ^{52}Cr | 3 | 0.5 | - | 3 | 0.002 | - |
| Structural materials, others | ^{59}Co | 6 | 37.2 | - | 4 | 0.006 | - |
| Structural materials, others | ^{58}Ni | 20 | 3 | - | 3 | 0.008 | - |
| Structural materials, others | ^{16}O | 4 | 0.0001 | - | 3 | 0.00000003 | - |
| Absorber | ^{10}B | 2 | 200 | - | 2 | 0.4 | - |
| Absorber | ^{113}Cd | 100 | 30,000 | - | 4 | 0.05 | - |
| Absorber | ^{135}Xe | 400,000 | 2,000,000 | - | 5 | 0.0008 | - |
| Absorber | ^{157}Gd | 804.5 | 253,200 | - | 2.86 | 0.00095 | |
| Absorber | ^{115}In | 2 | 100 | - | 4 | 0.02 | - |
| Fuel | ^{235}U | 10 | 99 | 583 | 4 | 0.09 | 1 |
| Fuel | ^{238}U | 9 | 2 | 0.00002 | 5 | 0.07 | 0.3 |
| Fuel | ^{239}Pu | 8 | 269 | 748 | 5 | 0.05 | 2 |

* negligible, less than 0.1% of the total cross section and below the Bragg scattering cutoff
