= Nuclear binding energy =

Minimum energy required to separate particles within a nucleus

Nuclear binding energy in nuclear physics and nuclear engineering is the minimum energy that is required to fully disassemble the nucleus of one atom into its constituent protons and neutrons, known collectively as nucleons. The binding energy for stable nuclei is always a positive number, as the nucleus must gain energy for the nucleons to move apart from each other. Nucleons are attracted to each other by the strong nuclear force. In theoretical nuclear physics, the nuclear binding energy is considered a negative number. In this context it represents the energy of the nucleus relative to the energy of the constituent nucleons when they are infinitely far apart. Both the experimental and theoretical views are equivalent, with slightly different emphasis on what the binding energy means.

The mass of an atomic nucleus is less than the sum of the individual masses of the free constituent protons and neutrons. The difference in mass can be calculated by the Einstein equation, E = mc^{2}, where E is the nuclear binding energy, c is the speed of light, and m is the difference in mass. This "missing mass" is known as the mass defect, and represents the energy that was released when the nucleus was formed.

The term nuclear binding energy may also refer to the energy balance in processes in which the nucleus splits into fragments composed of more than one nucleon. If new binding energy is available when light nuclei fuse (nuclear fusion), or when heavy nuclei split (nuclear fission), either process can result in release of this binding energy. This energy may be made available as nuclear energy and can be used to produce electricity, as in nuclear power, or in a nuclear weapon. When a large nucleus splits into pieces, excess energy is emitted as gamma rays and the kinetic energy of various ejected particles (nuclear fission products).

These nuclear binding energies and forces are on the order of one million times greater than the electron binding energies of light atoms like hydrogen.

== Introduction ==
=== Nuclear energy ===
An absorption or release of nuclear energy occurs in nuclear reactions or radioactive decay; those that absorb energy are called endothermic reactions and those that release energy are exothermic reactions. Energy is consumed or released because of differences in the nuclear binding energy between the incoming and outgoing products of the nuclear transmutation.

The best-known classes of exothermic nuclear transmutations are nuclear fission and nuclear fusion. In any exothermic nuclear process, nuclear mass might ultimately be converted to thermal energy, emitted as heat.

Nuclear energy may be released by fission, when heavy atomic nuclei (like uranium and plutonium) are broken apart into lighter nuclei. Fission is used to generate electric power in hundreds of locations worldwide.

Nuclear energy is also released during fusion, when light nuclei like hydrogen are combined to form heavier nuclei such as helium. The Sun and other stars use nuclear fusion to generate thermal energy which is later radiated from the surface. Additionally, fusion creates many of the heavier elements (see stellar nucleosynthesis).

In order to quantify the energy released or absorbed in any nuclear transmutation, one must know the nuclear binding energies of the nuclear components involved in the transmutation.

=== The nuclear force ===
Electrons and nuclei are kept together by electrostatic attraction (negative attracts positive). Furthermore, electrons are sometimes shared by neighboring atoms or transferred to them (by processes of quantum physics); this link between atoms is referred to as a chemical bond and is responsible for the formation of all chemical compounds.

The electric force does not hold nuclei together, because all protons carry a positive charge and repel each other. If two protons were touching, their repulsion force would be almost 40 newtons. Because each neutron carries total charge zero, a proton could electrically attract a neutron if the proton could induce the neutron to become electrically polarized. However, having the neutron between two protons (so their mutual repulsion decreases to 10 N) would attract the neutron only for an electric quadrupole (− + + −) arrangement. Higher multipoles, needed to satisfy more protons, cause weaker attraction, and quickly become implausible.

After the proton and neutron magnetic moments were measured and verified, it was apparent that their magnetic forces might be 20 or 30 newtons, attractive if properly oriented. A pair of protons would do 10^{−13} joules of work to each other as they approach – that is, they would need to release energy of 0.5 MeV in order to stick together. On the other hand, once a pair of nucleons magnetically stick, their external fields are greatly reduced, so it is difficult for many nucleons to accumulate much magnetic energy.

Therefore, another force, called the nuclear force (or residual strong force) holds the nucleons of nuclei together. This force is a residuum of the strong interaction, which binds quarks into nucleons at an even smaller level of distance.

The fact that nuclei do not clump together (fuse) under normal conditions suggests that the nuclear force must be weaker than the electric repulsion at larger distances, but stronger at close range. Therefore, it has short-range characteristics. An analogy to the nuclear force is the force between two small magnets: magnets are very difficult to separate when stuck together, but once pulled a short distance apart, the force between them drops almost to zero.

Unlike gravity or the electric force, the nuclear force is only effective at very short distances. At greater distances, the electrostatic force dominate: the protons repel each other because they are positively charged. For this reason, the protons forming the nuclei of ordinary hydrogen do not combine to form helium in normal conditions; the protons cannot get close enough for the nuclear force, which attracts them to each other, to become important. Furthermore, this process would also require some protons to combine with electrons and become neutrons (see p-p chain and CNO cycle); these processes require very high pressure and temperature to take place, and hence typically only occur in extreme environments such as stellar cores.

=== Physics of nuclei ===
There are around 94 naturally occurring elements on Earth. The atoms of each element have a nucleus containing a specific number of protons (always the same number for a given element), and some number of neutrons, which is often roughly a similar number. Two atoms of the same element having different numbers of neutrons are known as isotopes of the element. Different isotopes may have different properties – for example one might be stable and another might be unstable, and gradually undergo radioactive decay to become another element.

The hydrogen nucleus contains just one proton. Its isotope deuterium (a.k.a. heavy hydrogen), contains a proton and a neutron. The most common isotope of helium contains two protons and two neutrons, and those of carbon, nitrogen and oxygen – six, seven and eight of each particle, respectively. However, a helium nucleus weighs less than the sum of the weights of the two heavy hydrogen nuclei which combine to make it. The same is true for carbon, nitrogen and oxygen. For example, the carbon nucleus is slightly lighter than three helium nuclei, which can combine to make a carbon nucleus. This difference is known as the mass defect.

==== Mass defect ====
Mass defect (also called "mass deficit") is the difference between the mass of an object and the sum of the masses of its constituent particles. Mass defect can be explained using Albert Einstein's formula E = mc^{2}, published in 1905, which describes the equivalence of energy and mass. The decrease in mass is equal to the energy emitted in the reaction of an atom's creation divided by c^{2}. By this formula, adding energy increases mass (both weight and inertia), whereas removing energy decreases mass. For example, a helium atom containing four nucleons has a mass about 0.8% less than the total mass of four hydrogen atoms (each containing one nucleon). The helium nucleus has four nucleons bound together, and the binding energy which holds them together is, in effect, the missing 0.8% of mass.

For lighter elements, the energy that can be released by assembling them from lighter elements decreases, and energy can be released when they fuse. This is true for nuclei lighter than iron or nickel. For heavier nuclei, more energy is needed to bind them, and that energy may be released by breaking them up into fragments (known as nuclear fission). Nuclear power is generated at present by breaking up uranium nuclei in nuclear power reactors, and capturing the released energy as heat, which is converted to electricity.

As a rule, very light elements can fuse comparatively easily, and very heavy elements can break up via fission very easily; elements in the middle are more stable and it is difficult to make them undergo either fusion or fission in an environment such as a laboratory.

The reason the trend reverses after iron is the growing positive charge of the nuclei, which tends to force nuclei to break up. It is resisted by the strong nuclear interaction, which holds nucleons together. The electric force may be weaker than the strong nuclear force, but the strong force has a much more limited range: in an iron nucleus, each proton repels the other 25 protons, while the nuclear force only binds close neighbors. So for larger nuclei, the electrostatic forces tend to dominate and the nucleus will tend over time to break up.

As nuclei grow bigger still, this disruptive effect becomes steadily more significant. By the time polonium is reached (84 protons), nuclei can no longer accommodate their large positive charge, but emit their excess protons quite rapidly in the process of alpha decay—the emission of helium nuclei, each containing two protons and two neutrons. Because of this process, nuclei with more than 94 protons are not found naturally on Earth (see periodic table). The isotopes beyond uranium (atomic number 92) with the longest half-lives are plutonium-244 (80 million years) and curium-247 (16 million years).

==== Nuclear reactions in the Sun ====
The nuclear fusion process works as follows: five billion years ago, the new Sun formed when gravity pulled together a vast cloud of hydrogen and dust, from which the Earth and other planets also arose. The gravitational pull released energy and heated the early Sun, much in the way Hermann von Helmholtz proposed.

Thermal energy appears as the motion of atoms and molecules: the higher the temperature of a collection of particles, the greater is their velocity and the more violent are their collisions. When the temperature at the center of the newly formed Sun became great enough for collisions between hydrogen nuclei to overcome their electric repulsion, and bring them into the short range of the attractive nuclear force, nuclei began to stick together. When this began to happen, protons combined into deuterium and then helium, with some protons changing in the process to neutrons (plus positrons, positive electrons, which combine with electrons and annihilate into gamma-ray photons). This released nuclear energy now keeps up the high temperature of the Sun's core, and the heat also keeps the gas pressure high, keeping the Sun at its present size, and stopping gravity from compressing it any more. There is now a stable balance between gravity and pressure.

Different nuclear reactions may predominate at different stages of the Sun's existence, including the proton–proton reaction and the carbon–nitrogen cycle—which involves heavier nuclei, but whose final product is still the combination of protons to form helium.

Physicists and engineers have tried since the 1950s to derive useful power from nuclear fusion reactions that combine small nuclei into bigger ones, typically to heat boilers, whose steam could turn turbines and produce electricity. No earthly laboratory can match one feature of the solar powerhouse: the great mass of the Sun, whose weight keeps the hot plasma compressed and confines the nuclear furnace to the Sun's core. Instead, physicists use strong magnetic fields to confine the plasma, and for fuel they use heavy forms of hydrogen, which burn more easily. Magnetic traps can be rather unstable, and any plasma hot enough and dense enough to undergo nuclear fusion tends to slip out of them after a short time. Even with ingenious tricks, the confinement in most cases lasts only a small fraction of a second.

==== Combining nuclei ====
Small nuclei that are larger than hydrogen can combine into bigger ones and release energy, but in combining such nuclei, the amount of energy released is much smaller compared to hydrogen fusion. The reason is that while the overall process releases energy from letting the nuclear attraction do its work, energy must first be injected to force together positively charged protons, which also repel each other with their electric charge.

For elements that weigh more than iron (a nucleus with 26 protons), the fusion process no longer releases energy. In even heavier nuclei energy is consumed, not released, by combining similarly sized nuclei. With such large nuclei, overcoming the electric repulsion (which affects all protons in the nucleus) requires more energy than is released by the nuclear attraction (which is effective mainly between close neighbors). Conversely, energy could actually be released by breaking apart nuclei heavier than iron.

With the nuclei of elements heavier than lead, the electric repulsion is so strong that some of them spontaneously eject positive fragments, usually nuclei of helium that form stable alpha particles. This spontaneous break-up is one of the forms of radioactivity exhibited by some nuclei.

Nuclei heavier than lead (except for bismuth, thorium, and uranium) spontaneously break up too quickly to appear in nature as primordial elements, though they can be produced artificially or as intermediates in the decay chains of heavier elements. Generally, the heavier the nuclei are, the faster they spontaneously decay.

Iron nuclei are the most stable nuclei (in particular iron-56), and the best sources of energy are therefore nuclei whose weights are as far removed from iron as possible. One can combine the lightest ones—nuclei of hydrogen (protons)—to form nuclei of helium, and that is how the Sun generates its energy. Alternatively, one can break up the heaviest ones—nuclei of uranium or plutonium—into smaller fragments, and that is what nuclear reactors do.

=== Nuclear binding energy ===
An example that illustrates nuclear binding energy is the nucleus of ^{12}C (carbon-12), which contains 6 protons and 6 neutrons. The protons are all positively charged and repel each other, but the nuclear force overcomes the repulsion and causes them to stick together. The nuclear force is a close-range force (it is strongly attractive at a distance of 1.0 fm and becomes extremely small beyond a distance of 2.5 fm), and virtually no effect of this force is observed outside the nucleus. The nuclear force also pulls neutrons together, or neutrons and protons.

The energy of the nucleus is negative with regard to the energy of the particles pulled apart to infinite distance (just like the gravitational energy of planets of the Solar System), because energy must be utilized to split a nucleus into its individual protons and neutrons. Mass spectrometers have measured the masses of nuclei, which are always less than the sum of the masses of protons and neutrons that form them, and the difference—by the formula E = mc^{2}—gives the binding energy of the nucleus.

==== Nuclear fusion ====
The binding energy of helium is the energy source of the Sun and of most stars. The sun is composed of 74 percent hydrogen (measured by mass), an element having a nucleus consisting of a single proton. Energy is released in the Sun when 4 protons combine into a helium nucleus, a process in which two of them are also converted to neutrons.

The conversion of protons to neutrons is the result of another nuclear force, known as the weak (nuclear) force. The weak force, like the strong force, has a short range, but is much weaker than the strong force. The weak force tries to make the number of neutrons and protons into the most energetically stable configuration. For nuclei containing less than 40 particles, these numbers are usually about equal. Protons and neutrons are closely related and are collectively known as nucleons. As the number of particles increases toward a maximum of about 209, the number of neutrons to maintain stability begins to outstrip the number of protons, until the ratio of neutrons to protons is about three to two.

The protons of hydrogen combine to helium only if they have enough velocity to overcome each other's mutual repulsion sufficiently to get within range of the strong nuclear attraction. This means that fusion only occurs within a very hot gas. Hydrogen hot enough for combining to helium requires an enormous pressure to keep it confined, but suitable conditions exist in the central regions of the Sun, where such pressure is provided by the enormous weight of the layers above the core, pressed inward by the Sun's strong gravity. The process of combining protons to form helium is an example of nuclear fusion.

Producing helium from normal hydrogen would be practically impossible on earth because of the difficulty in creating deuterium. Research is being undertaken on developing a process using deuterium and tritium. The Earth's oceans contain a large amount of deuterium that could be used and tritium can be made in the reactor itself from lithium, and furthermore the helium product does not harm the environment, so some consider nuclear fusion a good alternative to supply our energy needs. Experiments to carry out this form of fusion have so far only partially succeeded. Sufficiently hot deuterium and tritium must be confined. One technique is to use very strong magnetic fields, because charged particles (like those trapped in the Earth's radiation belt) are guided by magnetic field lines.

==== The binding energy maximum and ways to approach it by decay ====
In the main isotopes of light elements, such as carbon, nitrogen and oxygen, the most stable combination of neutrons and of protons occurs when the numbers are equal (this continues to element 20, calcium). However, in heavier nuclei, the disruptive energy of protons increases, since they are confined to a tiny volume and repel each other. The energy of the strong force holding the nucleus together also increases, but at a slower rate, as if inside the nucleus, only nucleons close to each other are tightly bound, not ones more widely separated.

The net binding energy of a nucleus is that of the nuclear attraction, minus the disruptive energy of the electric force. As nuclei get heavier than helium, their net binding energy per nucleon (deduced from the difference in mass between the nucleus and the sum of masses of component nucleons) grows more and more slowly, reaching its peak at iron. As nucleons are added, the total nuclear binding energy always increases—but the total disruptive energy of electric forces (positive protons repelling other protons) also increases, and past iron, the second increase outweighs the first. Iron-56 (^{56}Fe) is the most efficiently bound nucleus, meaning that it has the least average mass per nucleon. However, nickel-62 is the most tightly bound nucleus in terms of binding energy per nucleon. (Note: The higher binding energy of nickel-62 does not translate to a larger mean mass loss than iron-56, because ^{62}Ni has a slightly higher ratio of neutrons/protons than does ^{56}Fe, and the presence of the heavier neutrons increases the average mass per nucleon of ^{62}Ni.)

To reduce the disruptive energy, the weak interaction allows the number of neutrons to exceed that of protons—for instance, the main isotope of iron has 26 protons and 30 neutrons. Isotopes also exist where the number of neutrons differs from the most stable number for that number of nucleons. If changing one proton into a neutron or one neutron into a proton increases the stability (lowering the mass), then this will happen through beta decay, meaning the nuclide will be radioactive.

The two methods for this conversion are mediated by the weak force, and involve types of beta decay. In the simplest beta decay, neutrons are converted to protons by emitting a negative electron and an antineutrino. This is always possible outside a nucleus because neutrons are more massive than protons by an equivalent of about 2.5 electrons. In the opposite process, which only happens within a nucleus, and not to free particles, a proton may become a neutron by ejecting a positron and an electron neutrino. This is permitted if enough energy is available between parent and daughter nuclides to do this (the required energy difference is equal to 1.022 MeV, which is the mass of 2 electrons). If the mass difference between parent and daughter is less than this, a proton-rich nucleus may still convert protons to neutrons by the process of electron capture, in which a proton simply electron captures one of the atom's K orbital electrons, emits a neutrino, and becomes a neutron.

Among the heaviest nuclei, starting with tellurium nuclei (element 52) containing 104 or more nucleons, electric forces may be so destabilizing that entire chunks of the nucleus may be ejected, usually as alpha particles, which consist of two protons and two neutrons (alpha particles are fast helium nuclei). (Beryllium-8 also decays, very quickly, into two alpha particles.) This type of decay becomes more and more probable as elements rise in atomic weight past 104.

The curve of binding energy is a graph that plots the binding energy per nucleon against atomic mass. This curve has its main peak at iron and nickel and then slowly decreases again, and also a narrow isolated peak at helium, which is more stable than other low-mass nuclides. The heaviest nuclei in more than trace quantities in nature, uranium ^{238}U, are unstable, but having a half-life of 4.5 billion years, close to the age of the Earth, they are still relatively abundant; they (and other nuclei heavier than helium) have formed in stellar evolution events like supernova explosions preceding the formation of the Solar System. The most common isotope of thorium, ^{232}Th, also undergoes alpha particle emission, and its half-life (time over which half a number of atoms decays) is even longer, by several times. In each of these, radioactive decay produces daughter isotopes that are also unstable, starting a chain of decays that ends in some stable isotope of lead.

== Calculation of nuclear binding energy ==
Calculation can be employed to determine the nuclear binding energy of nuclei. The calculation involves determining the nuclear mass defect, converting it into energy, and expressing the result as energy per mole of atoms, or as energy per nucleon.

=== Conversion of nuclear mass defect into energy ===
Nuclear mass defect is defined as the difference between the nuclear mass and the sum of the masses of the constituent nucleons. It is given by
$$\Delta m = Z m_p + (A-Z)m_n - M = Z m_p + N m_n - M$$

where:

- Z is the proton number (atomic number).
- A is the nucleon number (mass number).
- m_{p} is the mass of a proton, 1.67262192595(52)×10^{−27} kg.
- m_{n} is the mass of a neutron, 1.67492750056(85)×10^{−27} kg.
- M is the nuclear mass.
- N is the neutron number.

The nuclear mass defect is usually converted into nuclear binding energy, which is the minimum energy required to disassemble the nucleus into its constituent nucleons. This conversion is done with the mass–energy equivalence: E = ∆mc^{2}. However, it must be expressed as energy per mole of atoms or as energy per nucleon.

== Fission and fusion ==
Nuclear energy is released by the splitting (fission) or merging (fusion) of the nuclei of atom(s). The conversion of nuclear mass–energy to a form of energy, which can remove some mass when the energy is removed, is consistent with the mass–energy equivalence formula:
$$\Delta E = \Delta mc^2,$$
where

- $\Delta E$ = energy release,
- $\Delta m$ = mass defect, and
- $c$ = the speed of light in vacuum.

Nuclear energy was first discovered by French physicist Henri Becquerel in 1896, when he found that photographic plates stored in the dark near uranium were blackened like X-ray plates (X-rays had recently been discovered in 1895).

Nickel-62 has the highest binding energy per nucleon of any isotope. If an atom of lower average binding energy per nucleon is changed into two atoms of higher average binding energy per nucleon, energy is emitted. (The average here is the weighted average.) Also, if two atoms of lower average binding energy fuse into an atom of higher average binding energy, energy is emitted. The chart shows that fusion, or combining, of hydrogen nuclei to form heavier atoms releases energy, as does fission of uranium, the breaking up of a larger nucleus into smaller parts.

Nuclear energy is released by three exoenergetic (or exothermic) processes:

- Radioactive decay, where a neutron or proton in the radioactive nucleus decays spontaneously by emitting either particles, electromagnetic radiation (gamma rays), or both. Note that for radioactive decay, it is not strictly necessary for the binding energy to increase. What is strictly necessary is that the mass decrease. If a neutron turns into a proton and the energy of the decay is less than 0.782343 MeV, the difference between the masses of the neutron and proton multiplied by the speed of light squared, (such as rubidium-87 decaying to strontium-87), the average binding energy per nucleon will actually decrease.
- Fusion, two atomic nuclei fuse together to form a heavier nucleus
- Fission, the breaking of a heavy nucleus into two (or more rarely three) lighter nuclei, and some neutrons

The energy-producing nuclear interaction of light elements requires some clarification. Frequently, all light element energy-producing nuclear interactions are classified as fusion, however by the given definition above fusion requires that the products include a nucleus that is heavier than the reactants. Light elements can undergo energy-producing nuclear interactions by fusion or fission. All energy-producing nuclear interactions between two hydrogen isotopes and between hydrogen and helium-3 are fusion, as the product of these interactions include a heavier nucleus. However, the energy-producing nuclear interaction of a neutron with lithium-6 produces hydrogen-3 and helium-4, each a lighter nucleus. By the definition above, this nuclear interaction is fission, not fusion. When fission is caused by a neutron, as in this case, it is called induced fission.

Light element energy-producing nuclear interactions

Fusion
Reaction	Approx. Q (MeV)
^{1}H + ^{1}H → ^{2}H	1.44
^{1}H + ^{2}H → ^{3}He	5.52
^{2}H + ^{2}H → ^{3}H + p^{+}	4.08
^{2}H + ^{2}H → ^{3}He + n	3.27
^{2}H + ^{3}H → ^{4}He + n	17.53
^{2}H + ^{3}He → ^{4}He + p^{+}	18.34
^{3}He + ^{3}He → ^{4}He + p^{+} + p^{+}	12.85
^{3}He + ^{6}Li → ^{4}He + ^{4}He + p^{+}	22.36

Fission
Reaction	Approx. Q (MeV)
^{6}Li + p^{+} → ^{4}He + ^{3}He	4.02
^{6}Li + ^{2}H → ^{4}He + ^{4}He	11.18
^{6}Li + ^{3}He → ^{4}He + ^{4}He + p^{+}	0.94
^{7}Li + p^{+} → ^{4}He + ^{4}He	17.34
^{7}Li + ^{2}H → ^{4}He + ^{4}He + n	15.11
^{11}B + p^{+} → ^{4}He + ^{4}He + ^{4}He	8.68

== Binding energy for atoms ==
The binding energy of an atom (including its electrons) is not exactly the same as the binding energy of the atom's nucleus. The measured mass deficits of isotopes are always listed as mass deficits of the neutral atoms of that isotope, and mostly in MeV/c^{2}. As a consequence, the listed mass deficits are not a measure of the stability or binding energy of isolated nuclei, but for the whole atoms. There is a very practical reason for this, namely that it is very hard to totally ionize heavy elements, i.e. strip them of all of their electrons.

This practice is useful for other reasons, too: stripping all the electrons from a heavy unstable nucleus (thus producing a bare nucleus) changes the lifetime of the nucleus, or the nucleus of a stable neutral atom can likewise become unstable after stripping, indicating that the nucleus cannot be treated independently. Examples of this have been shown in bound-state β decay experiments performed at the GSI heavy ion accelerator. This is also evident from phenomena like electron capture. Theoretically, in orbital models of heavy atoms, the electron orbits partially inside the nucleus (it does not orbit in a strict sense, but has a non-vanishing probability of being located inside the nucleus).

A nuclear decay happens to the nucleus, meaning that properties ascribed to the nucleus change in the event. In the field of physics the concept of "mass deficit" as a measure for "binding energy" means "mass deficit of the neutral atom" (not just the nucleus) and is a measure for stability of the whole atom.

== Nuclear binding energy curve ==
Binding energy per nucleon for a selection of nuclides. The nuclide with the highest value, ^{62}Ni, is noted.

In the periodic table of elements, the series of light elements from hydrogen up to sodium is observed to exhibit generally increasing binding energy per nucleon as the atomic mass increases. This increase is generated by increasing forces per nucleon in the nucleus, as each additional nucleon is attracted by other nearby nucleons, and thus more tightly bound to the whole. Helium-4 and oxygen-16 are particularly stable exceptions to the trend (see figure on the right). This is because they are doubly magic, meaning their protons and neutrons both fill their respective nuclear shells.

The region of increasing binding energy is followed by a region of relative stability (saturation) in the sequence from about mass 30 through about mass 90. In this region, the nucleus has become large enough that nuclear forces no longer completely extend efficiently across its width. Attractive nuclear forces in this region, as atomic mass increases, are nearly balanced by repellent electromagnetic forces between protons, as the atomic number increases.

Finally, in the heavier elements, there is a gradual decrease in binding energy per nucleon as atomic number increases. In this region of nuclear size, electromagnetic repulsive forces are beginning to overcome the strong nuclear force attraction.

At the peak of binding energy, nickel-62 is the most tightly bound nucleus (per nucleon), followed by iron-58 and iron-56. This is the approximate basic reason why iron and nickel are very common metals in planetary cores, since they are produced profusely as end products in supernovae and in the final stages of silicon burning in stars. However, it is not binding energy per defined nucleon (as defined above), which controls exactly which nuclei are made, because within stars, neutrons and protons can inter-convert to release even more energy per generic nucleon. In fact, it has been argued that photodisintegration of ^{62}Ni to form ^{56}Fe may be energetically possible in an extremely hot star core, due to this beta decay conversion of neutrons to protons. This favors the creation of ^{56}Fe, the nuclide with the lowest mass per nucleon. However, at high temperatures not all matter will be in the lowest energy state. This energetic maximum should also hold for ambient conditions, say T = 298 K and p = 1 atm, for neutral condensed matter consisting of ^{56}Fe atoms—however, in these conditions nuclei of atoms are inhibited from fusing into the most stable and low energy state of matter.

Elements with high binding energy per nucleon, like iron and nickel, cannot undergo fission, but they can theoretically undergo fusion with hydrogen, deuterium, helium, and carbon, for instance:

^{62}Ni + ^{12}C → ^{74}Se Q = 5.467 MeV

It is generally believed that iron-56 is more common than nickel isotopes in the universe for mechanistic reasons, because its unstable progenitor nickel-56 is copiously made by staged build-up of 14 helium nuclei inside supernovas, where it has no time to decay to iron before being released into the interstellar medium in a matter of a few minutes, as the supernova explodes. However, nickel-56 then decays to cobalt-56 within a few weeks, then this radioisotope finally decays to iron-56 with a half-life of about 77.3 days. The radioactive decay-powered light curve of such a process has been observed to happen in type II supernovae, such as SN 1987A. In a star, there are no good ways to create nickel-62 by alpha-addition processes, or else there would presumably be more of this highly stable nuclide in the universe.

=== Binding energy and nuclide masses ===
The fact that the maximum binding energy is found in medium-sized nuclei is a consequence of the trade-off in the effects of two opposing forces that have different range characteristics. The attractive nuclear force (strong nuclear force), which binds protons and neutrons equally to each other, has a limited range due to a rapid exponential decrease in this force with distance. However, the repelling electromagnetic force, which acts between protons to force nuclei apart, falls off with distance much more slowly (as the inverse square of distance). For nuclei larger than about four nucleons in diameter, the additional repelling force of additional protons more than offsets any binding energy that results between further added nucleons as a result of additional strong force interactions. Such nuclei become increasingly less tightly bound as their size increases, though most of them are still stable. Finally, nuclei containing more than 209 nucleons (larger than about 6 nucleons in diameter) are all too large to be stable, and are subject to spontaneous decay to smaller nuclei.

Nuclear fusion produces energy by combining the very lightest elements into more tightly bound elements (such as hydrogen into helium), and nuclear fission produces energy by splitting the heaviest elements (such as uranium and plutonium) into more tightly bound elements (such as barium and krypton). The nuclear fission of a few light elements (such as lithium) occurs because helium-4 is a product and a more tightly bound element than slightly heavier elements. Both processes produce energy as the sum of the masses of the products is less than the sum of the masses of the reacting nuclei.

As seen above in the example of deuterium, nuclear binding energies are large enough that they may be easily measured as fractional mass deficits, according to the equivalence of mass and energy. The atomic binding energy is simply the amount of energy (and mass) released, when a collection of free nucleons are joined to form a nucleus.

Nuclear binding energy can be computed from the difference in mass of a nucleus, and the sum of the masses of the number of free neutrons and protons that make up the nucleus. Once this mass difference, called the mass defect or mass deficiency, is known, Einstein's mass–energy equivalence formula E = mc^{2} can be used to compute the binding energy of any nucleus. Early nuclear physicists used to refer to computing this value as a "packing fraction" calculation.

For example, the dalton (1 Da) is defined as 1/12 of the mass of a ^{12}C atom—but the atomic mass of a ^{1}H atom (which is a proton plus electron) is 1.007825 Da, so each nucleon in ^{12}C has lost, on average, about 0.8% of its mass in the form of binding energy.

=== Semiempirical formula for nuclear binding energy ===
For a nucleus with A nucleons, including Z protons and N neutrons, a semi-empirical formula for the binding energy (E_{B}) per nucleon is:

$$\frac{E_\text{B}}{A \cdot \text{MeV}} = a - \frac{b}{A^{1/3}} - \frac{c Z^2}{A^{4/3}} - \frac{d \left(N - Z\right)^2}{A^2} \pm \frac{e}{A^{7/4}}$$

where the coefficients are given by: $a = 14.0$; $b = 13.0$; $c = 0.585$; $d = 19.3$; $e = 33$.

The first term $a$ is called the saturation contribution and ensures that the binding energy per nucleon is the same for all nuclei to a first approximation. The term $-b/A^{1/3}$ is a surface tension effect and is proportional to the number of nucleons that are situated on the nuclear surface; it is largest for light nuclei. The term $-cZ^2/A^{4/3}$ is the Coulomb electrostatic repulsion; this becomes more important as $Z$ increases. The symmetry correction term $-d(N-Z)^2/A^2$ takes into account the fact that in the absence of other effects the most stable arrangement has equal numbers of protons and neutrons; this is because the n–p interaction in a nucleus is stronger than either the n−n or p−p interaction. The pairing term $\pm e/A^{7/4}$ is purely empirical; it is positive for even–even nuclei and negative for odd–odd nuclei. When A is odd, the pairing term is identically zero.

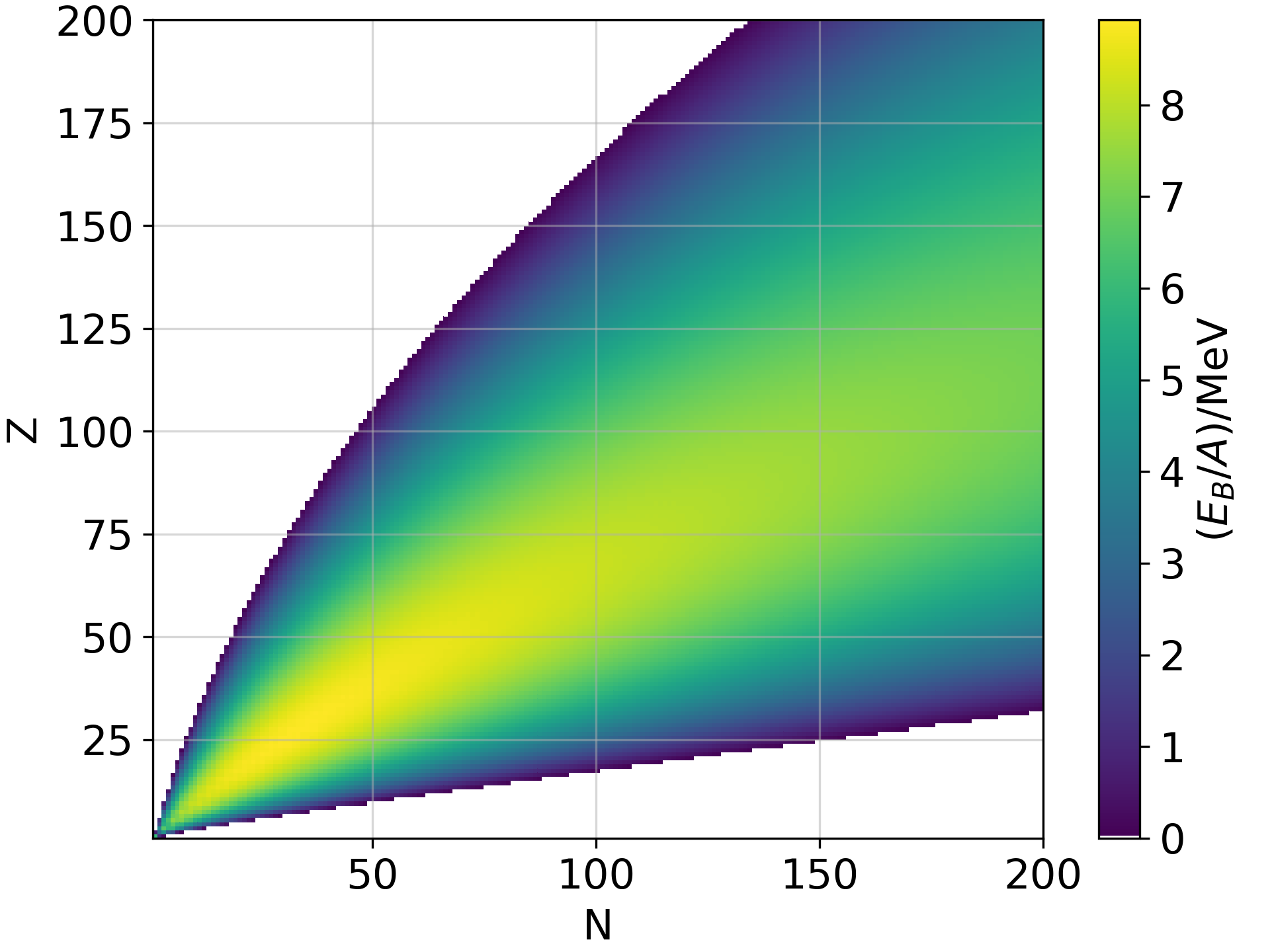
A graphical representation of the semi-empirical binding energy formula. The binding energy per nucleon in MeV (highest numbers in yellow, in excess of 8.5 MeV per nucleon) is plotted for various nuclides as a function of Z, the atomic number (y-axis), vs. N, the number of neutrons (x-axis). The highest numbers are seen for Z = 26 (iron).

== Example values deduced from experimentally measured atom nuclide masses ==
The following table lists some binding energies and mass defect values. Notice also that we use 1 Da = 931.494028(23) MeV/c^{2}. To calculate the binding energy we use the formula Z (m_{p} + m_{e}) + N m_{n} − m_{nuclide} where Z denotes the number of protons in the nuclides and N their number of neutrons. We take m_{p} = 938.2720813(58) MeV/c^{2}, m_{e} = 0.5109989461(30) MeV/c^{2} and m_{n} = 939.5654133(58) MeV/c^{2}. The letter A denotes the sum of Z and N (number of nucleons in the nuclide). If we assume the reference nucleon has the mass of a neutron (so that all "total" binding energies calculated are maximal) we could define the total binding energy as the difference from the mass of the nucleus, and the mass of a collection of A free neutrons. In other words, it would be (Z + N) m_{n} − m_{nuclide}. The "total binding energy per nucleon" would be this value divided by A.

Most strongly bound nuclides and atoms
nuclide	Z	N	mass excess	total mass	total mass / A	total binding energy / A	mass defect	binding energy	binding energy / A
^{56}Fe	26	30	−60.6054 MeV	55.934937 Da	0.9988372 Da	9.1538 MeV	0.528479 Da	492.275 MeV	8.7906 MeV
^{58}Fe	26	32	−62.1534 MeV	57.933276 Da	0.9988496 Da	9.1432 MeV	0.547471 Da	509.966 MeV	8.7925 MeV
^{60}Ni	28	32	−64.472 MeV	59.93079 Da	0.9988464 Da	9.1462 MeV	0.565612 Da	526.864 MeV	8.7811 MeV
^{62}Ni	28	34	−66.7461 MeV	61.928345 Da	0.9988443 Da	9.1481 MeV	0.585383 Da	545.281 MeV	8.7948 MeV

^{56}Fe has the lowest nucleon-specific mass of the four nuclides listed in this table, but this does not imply it is the most strongly bound atom per hadron, unless the choice of beginning hadrons is completely free. Iron releases the largest energy if any 56 nucleons are allowed to build a nuclide—changing one to another if necessary. The highest binding energy per hadron, with the hadrons starting as the same number of protons Z and total nucleons A as in the bound nucleus, is ^{62}Ni. Thus, the true absolute value of the total binding energy of a nucleus depends on what we are allowed to construct the nucleus out of. If all nuclei of mass number A were to be allowed to be constructed of A neutrons, then ^{56}Fe would release the most energy per nucleon, since it has a larger fraction of protons than ^{62}Ni. However, if nuclei are required to be constructed of only the same number of protons and neutrons that they contain, then nickel-62 is the most tightly bound nucleus, per nucleon.

Some light nuclides and atoms
nuclide	Z	N	mass excess	total mass	total mass / A	total binding energy / A	mass defect	binding energy	binding energy / A
n	0	1	8.0716 MeV	1.008665 Da	1.008665 Da	0.0000 MeV	0 Da	0 MeV	0 MeV
^{1}H	1	0	7.2890 MeV	1.007825 Da	1.007825 Da	0.7826 MeV	0.0000000146 Da	0.0000136 MeV	13.6 eV
^{2}H	1	1	13.13572 MeV	2.014102 Da	1.007051 Da	1.50346 MeV	0.002388 Da	2.22452 MeV	1.11226 MeV
^{3}H	1	2	14.9498 MeV	3.016049 Da	1.005350 Da	3.08815 MeV	0.0091058 Da	8.4820 MeV	2.8273 MeV
^{3}He	2	1	14.9312 MeV	3.016029 Da	1.005343 Da	3.09433 MeV	0.0082857 Da	7.7181 MeV	2.5727 MeV

In the table above it can be seen that the decay of a neutron, as well as the transformation of tritium into helium-3, releases energy; hence, it manifests a stronger bound new state when measured against the mass of an equal number of neutrons (and also a lighter state per number of total hadrons). Such reactions are not driven by changes in binding energies as calculated from previously fixed N and Z numbers of neutrons and protons, but rather in decreases in the total mass of the nuclide/per nucleon, with the reaction. (Note that the binding energy given above for hydrogen-1 is the atomic binding energy, not the nuclear binding energy which would be zero.)

== See also ==
- Atomic binding energy (energy required to disassemble an atom into free electrons and a nucleus)
- Bond dissociation energy (binding energy between the atoms in a chemical bond)
- Electron binding energy (energy required to free an electron from its atomic orbital or from a solid)
- Gravitational binding energy
- Quantum chromodynamics binding energy (addresses the mass and kinetic energy of the parts that bind the various quarks together inside a hadron)
