= SN 2016coi =

Type Ib/Ic supernova in galaxy UGC 11868

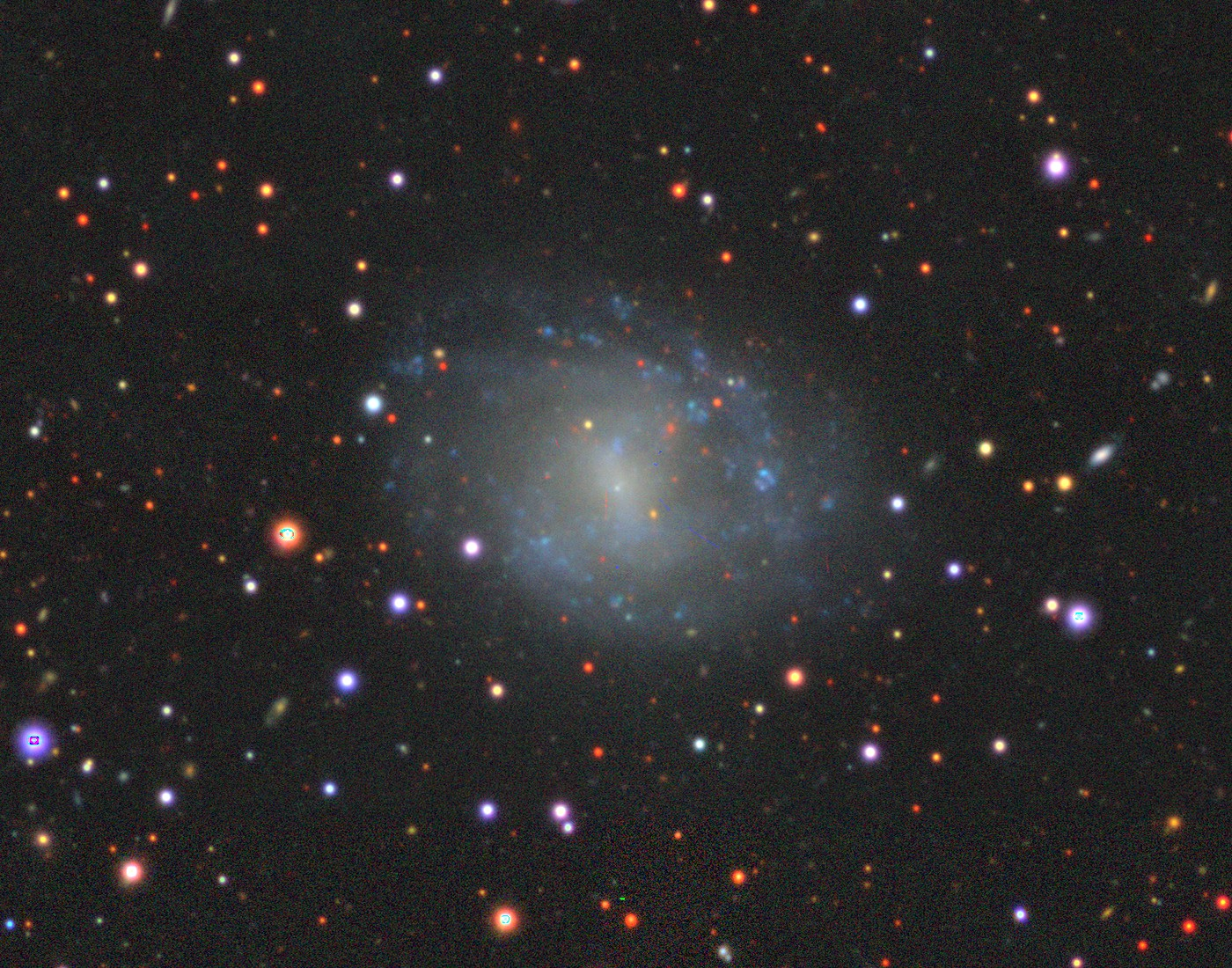
- Host galaxy UGC 11868 imaged by Legacy Surveys
- Event type: Supernova
- SN.Ic
- Date: 27 May 2016
- Constellation: Pegasus
- Right ascension: 21^{h} 59^{m} 04.14^{s}
- Declination: +18° 11′ 10.5″
- Epoch: J2000
- Redshift: 0.0036
- Host: UGC 11868
- Colour (B-V): 0.075
- Peak apparent magnitude: 14.76±0.01
- Total energy output: (7–8)×10^{51} erg
- Other designations: iPTF 16coi, AT 2016coi, ASASSN -16fp, SN 2016coi, DLT 16d

SN 2016coi (also known as ASASSN-16fp), was a broad-lined supernova in the barred spiral galaxy UGC 11868. It was first discovered on May 27, 2016, by the All Sky Automated Survey for SuperNovae (ASAS-SN), whilst the actual explosion happened around 2 to 3 days prior. It had an apparent brightness of 15.7 in the V band when it was discovered. Its peak absolute magnitude was around −17.7. It is about 51.5 million light years away from the Earth, and located in the constellation Pegasus. It is located around 31.7" north and 7.9" west from the center of its galaxy.

The energy produced by the supernova was around (7–8)×10^{51} ergs, and ejected 4 to 7 solar masses worth of material. It also ejected around 0.15 solar masses worth of nickel-56 from the explosion.

== Characteristics ==
It was initially classified as a broad-lined Type Ic supernova based on its spectral features. Later studies classified it as an intermediate object between a Type Ib and a Type Ic, due to spectral analysis finding traces of helium within the ejecta. The ejecta expansion velocity reached around 16,000 km/s and then slowed down to roughly 8,000 km/s just one month after reaching its maximum. There are helium absorption features that also were observed with velocities around 20,000 km/s before maximum light.

The supernova came from a massive progenitor star, most likely a Wolf–Rayet star. Radio and X-ray observations indicated it was surrounded by a very dense circumstellar envelope. It experienced a phase of higher mass loss around 30 years before its collapse, and it was losing material at twice the rate when compared to its final decade of life. It had an estimated initial main-sequence mass of around 23 to 28 solar masses. It experienced a significant amount of mass loss before its collapse and it was left with a final core mass of 6 to 10 solar masses. The star did not completely strip out from its outer layers before the explosion.

There were nebular spectral features that began appearing in the spectra around 90 days after the explosion. It showed the optical spectra had a low calcium to oxygen emission line ratio of around 0.2. This can indicate the progenitor had a large core mass during the time of its explosion. There are also forbidden oxygen emission lines that blueshifted to around 400 km/s. The blueshift may indicate some asymmetry in the distribution of the ejecta. The V band brightness decreased by around 1.7 magnitudes per 100 days after the explosion. This decrease is quicker than expected from the radioactive decay of cobalt-56. It can also indicate that gamma rays were leaking outward from the increasing ejecta.

The supernova's helium features disappeared after reaching maximum light, which is uncommon for normal Type Ib supernovae. The helium is likely caused by the nickel-56 mixing with the outer ejecta layers. It has a broad bolometric light curve, with it being Δ_{15} ≈ 0.41 magnitudes. This indicates a relatively long photon diffusion timescale within the ejecta.
