= Isotopes of iron =

Isotopes of iron (_{26}Fe)
Main isotopes			Decay	
Isotope	abundance	half-life (t_{1/2})	mode	product
^{54}Fe	5.85%	stable		
^{55}Fe	synth	2.7562 y	ε	^{55}Mn
^{56}Fe	91.8%	stable		
^{57}Fe	2.12%	stable		
^{58}Fe	0.28%	stable		
^{59}Fe	synth	44.50 d	β^{−}	^{59}Co
^{60}Fe	trace	2.62×10^{6} y	β^{−}	^{60}Co

Standard atomic weight A_{r}°(Fe)
- 55.845±0.002; 55.845±0.002 (abridged)

Natural iron (_{26}Fe) consists of four stable isotopes: 5.85% ^{54}Fe, 91.75% ^{56}Fe, 2.12% ^{57}Fe and 0.28% ^{58}Fe. There are 28 known radioisotopes and 8 nuclear isomers, the most stable of which are ^{60}Fe (half-life 2.62 million years) and ^{55}Fe (half-life 2.7562 years).

Much of the past work on measuring the isotopic composition of iron has centered on determining ^{60}Fe variations due to processes accompanying nucleosynthesis (e.g., meteorite studies) and ore formation. In the last decade however, advances in mass spectrometry technology have allowed the detection and quantification of minute, naturally occurring variations in the ratios of the stable isotopes of iron. Much of this work has been driven by the Earth and planetary science communities, though applications to biological and industrial systems are beginning to emerge.

== List of isotopes ==
Nuclide (Note: ^{m}Fe – Excited nuclear isomer.)	Z	N	Isotopic mass (Da) (Note: ( ) – Uncertainty (1σ) is given in concise form in parentheses after the corresponding last digits.) (Note: # – Atomic mass marked #: value and uncertainty derived not from purely experimental data, but at least partly from trends from the Mass Surface (TMS).)	Discovery year	Half-life (Note: # – Values marked # are not purely derived from experimental data, but at least partly from trends of neighboring nuclides (TNN).)	Decay mode (Note: Modes of decay: EC: / Electron capture; IT: / Isomeric transition; n: / Neutron emission; p: / Proton emission)	Daughter isotope (Note: Bold symbol as daughter – Daughter product is stable.)	Spin and parity (Note: ( ) spin value – Indicates spin with weak assignment arguments.)	Natural abundance (mole fraction)	
Nuclide	Excitation energy			Discovery year	Half-life	Decay mode	Daughter isotope	Spin and parity	Normal proportion	Range of variation
^{45}Fe	26	19	45.01547(30)#	1996	2.5(2) ms	2p (70%)	^{43}Cr	3/2+#		
^{45}Fe	26	19	45.01547(30)#	1996	2.5(2) ms	β^{+}, p (18.9%)	^{44}Cr	3/2+#		
^{45}Fe	26	19	45.01547(30)#	1996	2.5(2) ms	β^{+}, 2p (7.8%)	^{43}V	3/2+#		
^{46}Fe	26	20	46.00130(32)#	1992	13.0(20) ms	β^{+}, p (78.7%)	^{45}Cr	0+		
^{46}Fe	26	20	46.00130(32)#	1992	13.0(20) ms	β^{+} (21.3%)	^{46}Mn	0+		
^{46}Fe	26	20	46.00130(32)#	1992	13.0(20) ms	β^{+}, 2p?	^{44}V	0+		
^{47}Fe	26	21	46.99235(54)#	1992	21.9(2) ms	β^{+}, p (88.4%)	^{46}Cr	7/2−#		
^{47}Fe	26	21	46.99235(54)#	1992	21.9(2) ms	β^{+} (11.6%)	^{47}Mn	7/2−#		
^{48}Fe	26	22	47.980667(99)	1987	45.3(6) ms	β^{+} (84.7%)	^{48}Mn	0+		
^{48}Fe	26	22	47.980667(99)	1987	45.3(6) ms	β^{+}, p (15.3%)	^{47}Cr	0+		
^{49}Fe	26	23	48.973429(26)	1970	64.7(3) ms	β^{+}, p (56.7%)	^{48}Cr	(7/2−)		
^{49}Fe	26	23	48.973429(26)	1970	64.7(3) ms	β^{+} (43.3%)	^{49}Mn	(7/2−)		
^{50}Fe	26	24	49.9629880(90)	1977	152.0(6) ms	β^{+}	^{50}Mn	0+		
^{50}Fe	26	24	49.9629880(90)	1977	152.0(6) ms	β^{+}, p?	^{49}Cr	0+		
^{51}Fe	26	25	50.9568551(15)	1972	305.4(23) ms	β^{+}	^{51}Mn	5/2−		
^{52}Fe	26	26	51.94811336(19)	1948	8.275(8) h	β^{+}	^{52}Mn	0+		
^{52m}Fe	6960.7(3) keV			1975	45.9(6) s	β^{+} (99.98%)	^{52}Mn	12+		
^{52m}Fe	6960.7(3) keV			1975	45.9(6) s	IT (0.021%)	^{52}Fe	12+		
^{53}Fe	26	27	52.9453056(18)	1938	8.51(2) min	β^{+}	^{53}Mn	7/2−		
^{53m}Fe	3040.4(3) keV			1966	2.54(2) min	IT	^{53}Fe	19/2−		
^{54}Fe	26	28	53.93960819(37)	1924	Observationally Stable (Note: Believed to decay by β^{+}β^{+} to ^{54}Cr with a half-life of over 4.4×10^{20} a)			0+	0.05845(105)	
^{54m}Fe	6527.1(11) keV			1978	364(7) ns	IT	^{54}Fe	10+		
^{55}Fe	26	29	54.93829116(33)	1939	2.7562(4) y	EC	^{55}Mn	3/2−		
^{56}Fe (Note: Lowest mass per nucleon of all nuclides; End product of stellar nucleosynthesis)	26	30	55.93493554(29)	1922	Stable			0+	0.91754(106)	
^{57}Fe	26	31	56.93539195(29)	1935	Stable			1/2−	0.02119(29)	
^{58}Fe	26	32	57.93327358(34)	1935	Stable			0+	0.00282(12)	
^{59}Fe	26	33	58.93487349(35)	1938	44.500(12) d	β^{−}	^{59}Co	3/2−		
^{60}Fe	26	34	59.9340702(37)	1957	2.62(4)×10^{6} y	β^{−}	^{60}Co	0+	trace	
^{61}Fe	26	35	60.9367462(28)	1957	5.98(6) min	β^{−}	^{61}Co	(3/2−)		
^{61m}Fe	861.67(11) keV			1998	238(5) ns	IT	^{61}Fe	9/2+		
^{62}Fe	26	36	61.9367918(30)	1975	68(2) s	β^{−}	^{62}Co	0+		
^{63}Fe	26	37	62.9402727(46)	1980	6.1(6) s	β^{−}	^{63}Co	(5/2−)		
^{64}Fe	26	38	63.9409878(54)	1980	2.0(2) s	β^{−}	^{64}Co	0+		
^{65}Fe	26	39	64.9450153(55)	1985	805(10) ms	β^{−}	^{65}Co	(1/2−)		
^{65}Fe	26	39	64.9450153(55)	1985	805(10) ms	β^{−}, n?	^{64}Co	(1/2−)		
^{65m1}Fe	393.7(2) keV			1999	1.12(15) s	β^{−}?	^{65}Co	(9/2+)		
^{65m2}Fe	397.6(2) keV			1998	418(12) ns	IT	^{65}Fe	(5/2+)		
^{66}Fe	26	40	65.9462500(44)	1985	467(29) ms	β^{−}	^{66}Co	0+		
^{66}Fe	26	40	65.9462500(44)	1985	467(29) ms	β^{−}, n?	^{65}Co	0+		
^{67}Fe	26	41	66.9509300(41)	1985	394(9) ms	β^{−}	^{67}Co	(1/2-)		
^{67}Fe	26	41	66.9509300(41)	1985	394(9) ms	β^{−}, n?	^{66}Co	(1/2-)		
^{67m1}Fe	403(9) keV			1998	64(17) μs	IT	^{67}Fe	(5/2+,7/2+)		
^{67m2}Fe	450(100)# keV			(2003) (Note: Not clear this is a different isomer; it has only been suggested)	75(21) μs	IT	^{67}Fe	(9/2+)		
^{68}Fe	26	42	67.95288(21)#	1985	188(4) ms	β^{−}	^{68}Co	0+		
^{68}Fe	26	42	67.95288(21)#	1985	188(4) ms	β^{−}, n?	^{67}Co	0+		
^{69}Fe	26	43	68.95792(22)#	1992	162(7) ms	β^{−}	^{69}Co	1/2−#		
^{69}Fe	26	43	68.95792(22)#	1992	162(7) ms	β^{−}, n?	^{68}Co	1/2−#		
^{69}Fe	26	43	68.95792(22)#	1992	162(7) ms	β^{−}, 2n?	^{67}Co	1/2−#		
^{70}Fe	26	44	69.96040(32)#	1997	61.4(7) ms	β^{−}	^{70}Co	0+		
^{70}Fe	26	44	69.96040(32)#	1997	61.4(7) ms	β^{−}, n?	^{69}Co	0+		
^{71}Fe	26	45	70.96572(43)#	1997	34.3(26) ms	β^{−}	^{71}Co	7/2+#		
^{71}Fe	26	45	70.96572(43)#	1997	34.3(26) ms	β^{−}, n?	^{70}Co	7/2+#		
^{71}Fe	26	45	70.96572(43)#	1997	34.3(26) ms	β^{−}, 2n?	^{69}Co	7/2+#		
^{72}Fe	26	46	71.96860(54)#	1997	17.0(10) ms	β^{−}	^{72}Co	0+		
^{72}Fe	26	46	71.96860(54)#	1997	17.0(10) ms	β^{−}, n?	^{71}Co	0+		
^{72}Fe	26	46	71.96860(54)#	1997	17.0(10) ms	β^{−}, 2n?	^{70}Co	0+		
^{73}Fe	26	47	72.97425(54)#	2010	12.9(16) ms	β^{−}	^{73}Co	7/2+#		
^{73}Fe	26	47	72.97425(54)#	2010	12.9(16) ms	β^{−}, n?	^{72}Co	7/2+#		
^{73}Fe	26	47	72.97425(54)#	2010	12.9(16) ms	β^{−}, 2n?	^{71}Co	7/2+#		
^{74}Fe	26	48	73.97782(54)#	2010	5(5) ms	β^{−}	^{74}Co	0+		
^{74}Fe	26	48	73.97782(54)#	2010	5(5) ms	β^{−}, n?	^{73}Co	0+		
^{74}Fe	26	48	73.97782(54)#	2010	5(5) ms	β^{−}, 2n?	^{72}Co	0+		
^{75}Fe	26	49	74.98422(64)#	2013	9# ms [>620 ns]	β^{−}?	^{75}Co	9/2+#		
^{75}Fe	26	49	74.98422(64)#	2013	9# ms [>620 ns]	β^{−}, n?	^{74}Co	9/2+#		
^{75}Fe	26	49	74.98422(64)#	2013	9# ms [>620 ns]	β^{−}, 2n?	^{73}Co	9/2+#		
^{76}Fe	26	50	75.98863(64)#	2017	3# ms [>410 ns]	β^{−}?	^{76}Co	0+		
^{77}Fe	26	51		2026						
This table header & footer:

== Iron-56 ==
^{56}Fe is the most abundant isotope of iron. It is also the isotope with the lowest mass per nucleon, 930.412 MeV/c^{2}, though not the isotope with the highest nuclear binding energy per nucleon, which is nickel-62. However, because of the details of how nucleosynthesis works, ^{56}Fe is a more common endpoint of fusion inside supernovae, where it is mostly produced as ^{56}Ni, which subsequently decays to ^{56}Co and then iron. Thus, ^{56}Fe is more common in the universe, relative to other heavy elements, including ^{62}Ni, ^{58}Fe, and ^{60}Ni, all of which have a comparably high binding energy.

== Iron-57 ==
^{57}Fe is widely used in Mössbauer spectroscopy and the related nuclear resonance vibrational spectroscopy due to the low natural variation in energy of the 14.4 keV nuclear transition. The transition was famously used to make the first definitive measurement of gravitational redshift, in the 1960 Pound–Rebka experiment.

== Iron-60 ==
Iron-60 has a half-life of 2.62 million years, but was thought until 2009 to have a half-life of 1.5 million years. It undergoes beta decay to ^{60}Co, which then decays with the much shorter half-life of about 5 years to stable ^{60}Ni.

In phases of the meteorites Semarkona and Chervony Kut, a correlation between the excess concentration of ^{60}Ni, the granddaughter isotope of ^{60}Fe, and the abundance of the stable iron isotopes could be found, which is evidence for the existence of ^{60}Fe at the time of formation of the Solar System. Depending on its original abundance, the energy from the decay of ^{60}Fe may have been significant, along with that of ^{26}Al, to the remelting and differentiation of asteroids and planetesimals after their formation. These nickel abundances in extraterrestrial materials may also provide further insight into the origin of the Solar System and its early history.

Live (interstellar) iron-60 was first identified in deep sea sediments in 1999. These are deep sea ferromanganese crusts, which are constantly growing, aggregating iron, manganese, and other elements. Iron-60 has been found in fossilized bacteria in sea floor sediments. In 2019, researchers found ^{60}Fe in Antarctica. Iron-60 shows two peaks in deep sea sediments, the first 1.7–3.2 million years ago and the second 6.5–8.7 million years ago. The peaks are related to the passage of the Solar System through the Local Bubble and likely the Orion–Eridanus Superbubble. These superbubbles were created by multiple supernovae. Traces of iron-60 have also been found in lunar samples.

The distance to the supernova of origin can be estimated by relating the amount of iron-60 intercepted as Earth passes through the expanding supernova ejecta. Assuming that the material ejected in a supernova expands uniformly out from its origin as a sphere with surface area 4πr^{2}. The fraction of the material intercepted by the Earth is dependent on its cross-sectional area (πR 2
Earth ) as it passes through the expanding debris:

$$M_{\text {Fraction intercepted }}=\frac{\pi R_{\text {Earth }}^{2}}{4 \pi r^{2}} M_{e j}$$

where M_{ej} is the mass of ejected material. Assuming the intercepted material is distributed uniformly across the surface of the Earth (4πR 2
Earth ), the mass surface density (Σ_{ej}) of the supernova ejecta on Earth is:

$$\Sigma_{e j}=\frac{M_{\text {Fraction intercepted }}}{A_{\text {surface,Earth }}}=\frac{M_{e j}}{16 \pi r^2}$$

The number of ^{60}Fe atoms per unit area found on Earth can be estimated if the typical amount of ^{60}Fe ejected from a supernova is known. This can be done by dividing the surface mass density (Σ_{ej}) by the atomic mass of ^{60}Fe.

$$N_{60}=\left(\frac{M_{e j, 60} / m_{60}}{16 \pi r^2}\right)$$

The equation for N^{60} can be rearranged to find the distance to the supernova.

$$r=\sqrt{\frac{M_{e j, 60}}{16 \pi m_{60} N_{60}}}$$

An example calculation for the distance to the supernova point of origin is given below. This calculation uses speculative values for terrestrial ^{60}Fe atom surface density (N_{60} ≈ 4 × 10^{11} atoms/m^{2}) and a rough estimate of the mass of ^{60}Fe ejected by a supernova (10×10^{−5} M_{☉}).

$$\begin{align}
r&=\sqrt{\frac{10^{-5} M_{\odot}}{16 \pi\left(60 m_p\right) N_{60}}} \\
r&=3 \times 10^{18} m=100 p c
\end{align}$$

More sophisticated analyses have been reported that take into consideration the flux and deposition of ^{60}Fe as well as possible interfering background sources.

Cobalt-60, the decay product of iron-60, emits 1.173 MeV and 1.332 MeV gamma rays as it decays. These lines have long been important targets for gamma-ray astronomy, and have been detected by the gamma-ray observatory INTEGRAL. The signal traces the Galactic plane, showing that ^{60}Fe synthesis is ongoing in our galaxy, and probing element production in massive stars.

== See also ==
Daughter products other than iron

- Isotopes of cobalt
- Isotopes of manganese
- Isotopes of chromium
- Isotopes of vanadium
