= Iron-55 =

Artificial radioisotope of iron

General
- Symbol: ^{55}Fe
- Names: iron-55
- Protons (Z): 26
- Neutrons (N): 29

Nuclide data
- Half-life (t_{1/2}): 2.7562 years
- Decay products: ^{55}Mn

Decay modes
- Decay mode: Decay energy (MeV)
- Electron capture: 0.2312

Iron-55 (^{55}Fe) is a radioactive isotope of iron with a nucleus containing 26 protons and 29 neutrons. It decays by electron capture to manganese-55 with a half-life of 2.7562 years. This decay is to the ground state of the daughter, so emits only X-rays and Auger electrons. It is sometimes used as an X-ray source for various scientific analysis methods, such as X-ray diffraction and X-ray fluorescence.

== Decay ==
Iron-55 decays via electron capture to manganese-55, after which the electrons around the nucleus rapidly adjust themselves to the lowered charge without leaving their shell, and shortly thereafter the vacancy (normally in the K shell) left by the captured electron is filled by an electron from a higher shell. The difference in energy is released by emitting Auger electrons of 5.19 keV, with probability 60.1%, K-alpha-1 X-rays with energy of 5.89875 keV and probability 16.2%, K-alpha-2 X-rays with energy of 5.88765 keV and probability 8.2%, or K-beta X-rays with nominal energy of 6.49045 keV and a probability about 2.85%. The energies of the K-alpha-1 and -2 X-rays are so similar that they are often specified as mono-energetic radiation with 5.9 keV photon energy. The remaining 13% is accounted for by capture from shells higher than K, resulting in lower-energy photons and electrons.

== Use ==
The K-alpha X-rays emitted by the manganese-55 after the electron capture have been used as a laboratory source of X-rays in various X-ray scattering techniques. The advantages of the emitted X-rays are that they are monochromatic and are continuously produced over a years-long period. No electrical power is needed for this emission, which is ideal for portable X-ray instruments, such as X-ray fluorescence instruments. The ExoMars mission of ESA used, in 2016, such an iron-55 source for its combined X-ray diffraction/X-ray fluorescence spectrometer. The 2011 Mars mission MSL used a functionally similar spectrometer, but with a traditional, electrically powered X-ray source.

The Auger electrons can be applied in electron capture detectors for gas chromatography. The more widely used nickel-63 sources provide electrons from beta decay.

== Occurrence ==
Iron-55 is most effectively produced by irradiation of iron with neutrons (in a nuclear reactor or detonation). The reactions (^{54}Fe(n,γ)^{55}Fe and ^{56}Fe(n,2n)^{55}Fe) of the two most abundant isotopes iron-54 and iron-56 with neutrons yield iron-55. Most of the observed iron-55 is produced by these irradiation reactions; it is not a primary fission product.

As a result of atmospheric nuclear tests in the 1950s, and until the test ban in 1963, considerable amounts of iron-55 were released into the biosphere. During this time, people close to the test ranges, for example Iñupiat (Alaska Natives) and inhabitants of the Marshall Islands, accumulated significant amounts of radioactive iron. However, the short half-life and the test ban decreased, within several years, the available amount of iron-55 nearly to the pre-nuclear test levels.

== See also ==
- Isotopes of iron
