= Iron-56 =

Isotope of iron

General
- Symbol: ^{56}Fe
- Names: iron-56
- Protons (Z): 26
- Neutrons (N): 30

Nuclide data
- Natural abundance: 91.754%
- Isotope mass: 55.9349355 Da
- Spin: 0+
- Excess energy: −60601.003±1.354 keV
- Binding energy: 492253.892±1.356 keV

Nuclear binding energy per nucleon of common isotopes; iron-56 labelled at the curve's crest. The rarer isotopes nickel-62 and iron-58, which both have higher binding energies, are not shown.

Iron-56 (^{56}Fe) is one of four stable isotopes of iron, and the most common, comprising about 91.754% of the iron on Earth.

Of all nuclides, iron-56 has the lowest mass per nucleon. With a binding energy of 8.79 MeV per nucleon, iron-56 is one of the most tightly bound nuclei.

The high nuclear binding energy for ^{56}Fe represents the point where further nuclear reactions become energetically unfavorable. Because of this, it is among the heaviest elements formed in stellar nucleosynthesis reactions in massive stars. These reactions fuse lighter elements like magnesium, silicon, and sulfur to form heavier elements. Among the heavier elements formed is ^{56}Ni, which subsequently decays to ^{56}Co and then ^{56}Fe.

== Relationship to nickel-62 ==
Nickel-62, a relatively rare isotope of nickel, has a higher nuclear binding energy per nucleon; this is consistent with having a higher mass-per-nucleon because nickel-62 has a greater proportion of neutrons, which are slightly more massive than protons. (See the nickel-62 article for more). Light elements undergoing nuclear fusion and heavy elements undergoing nuclear fission release energy as their nucleons bind more tightly, so ^{62}Ni might be expected to be common. However, during stellar nucleosynthesis the competition between photodisintegration and alpha capturing causes more ^{56}Ni to be produced than ^{62}Ni (^{56}Fe is produced later in the star's ejection shell as ^{56}Ni decays).

Although nickel-62 has a higher binding energy per nucleon, the conversion of 28 atoms of nickel-62 into 31 atoms of iron-56 releases energy: 5.7 keV per nucleon. As the universe ages, matter will slowly convert to ever more tightly bound nuclei, approaching ^{56}Fe, ultimately leading to the formation of iron stars in, roughly, 10^{1500} years, assuming an expanding universe without proton decay.

== See also ==
- Isotopes of iron
- Iron star

Lighter: iron-55	Iron-56 is an isotope of iron	Heavier: iron-57
Decay product of: manganese-56 cobalt-56	Decay chain of iron-56	Decays to: Stable
