= Isotopes of cobalt =

Isotopes of cobalt (_{27}Co)
Main isotopes			Decay	
Isotope	abundance	half-life (t_{1/2})	mode	product
^{56}Co	synth	77.24 d	β^{+}	^{56}Fe
^{57}Co	synth	271.81 d	ε	^{57}Fe
^{58}Co	synth	70.84 d	β^{+}	^{58}Fe
^{59}Co	100%	stable		
^{60}Co	trace	5.2714 y	β^{−}	^{60}Ni

Standard atomic weight A_{r}°(Co)
- 58.933194±0.000003; 58.933±0.001 (abridged)

Naturally occurring cobalt, Co, consists of a single stable isotope, ^{59}Co (thus, cobalt is a mononuclidic element). Twenty-eight radioisotopes have been characterized; the most stable are ^{60}Co with a half-life of 5.2714 years, ^{57}Co (271.81 days), ^{56}Co (77.24 days), and ^{58}Co (70.84 days). All other isotopes have half-lives of less than 18 hours and most of these have half-lives of less than 1 second. This element also has 19 meta states, of which the most stable is ^{58m1}Co with a half-life of 8.85 hours.

The isotopes of cobalt range in atomic weight from ^{50}Co to ^{78}Co. The main decay mode for isotopes with atomic mass less than that of the stable isotope, ^{59}Co, is electron capture to iron isotopes, and the main mode of decay for those with greater mass is beta decay to nickel isotopes.

== List of isotopes ==
Nuclide (Note: ^{m}Co – Excited nuclear isomer.)	Z	N	Isotopic mass (Da) (Note: ( ) – Uncertainty (1σ) is given in concise form in parentheses after the corresponding last digits.) (Note: # – Atomic mass marked #: value and uncertainty derived not from purely experimental data, but at least partly from trends from the Mass Surface (TMS).)	Discovery year	Half-life (Note: # – Values marked # are not purely derived from experimental data, but at least partly from trends of neighboring nuclides (TNN).)	Decay mode (Note: Modes of decay: EC: / Electron capture; IT: / Isomeric transition; n: / Neutron emission; p: / Proton emission)	Daughter isotope (Note: Bold symbol as daughter – Daughter product is stable.)	Spin and parity (Note: ( ) spin value – Indicates spin with weak assignment arguments.)	Isotopic abundance
Nuclide	Excitation energy			Discovery year	Half-life	Decay mode	Daughter isotope	Spin and parity	Isotopic abundance
^{50}Co	27	23	49.98112(14)	1987	38.8(2) ms	β^{+}, p (70.5%)	^{49}Mn	(6+)	
^{50}Co	27	23	49.98112(14)	1987	38.8(2) ms	β^{+} (29.5%)	^{50}Fe	(6+)	
^{50}Co	27	23	49.98112(14)	1987	38.8(2) ms	β^{+}, 2p?	^{48}Cr	(6+)	
^{51}Co	27	24	50.970647(52)	1987	68.8(19) ms	β^{+} (96.2%)	^{51}Fe	7/2−	
^{51}Co	27	24	50.970647(52)	1987	68.8(19) ms	β^{+}, p (<3.8%)	^{50}Mn	7/2−	
^{52}Co	27	25	51.9631302(57)	1987	111.7(21) ms	β^{+}	^{52}Fe	6+	
^{52}Co	27	25	51.9631302(57)	1987	111.7(21) ms	β^{+}, p?	^{51}Mn	6+	
^{52m}Co	376(9) keV			2017	102(5) ms	β^{+}	^{52}Fe	2+	
^{52m}Co	376(9) keV			2017	102(5) ms	IT?	^{52}Co	2+	
^{52m}Co	376(9) keV			2017	102(5) ms	β^{+}, p?	^{51}Mn	2+	
^{53}Co	27	26	52.9542033(19)	1970	244.6(28) ms	β^{+}	^{53}Fe	7/2−#	
^{53m}Co	3174.3(9) keV			1970	250(10) ms	β^{+}? (~98.5%)	^{53}Fe	(19/2−)	
^{53m}Co	3174.3(9) keV			1970	250(10) ms	p (~1.5%)	^{52}Fe	(19/2−)	
^{54}Co	27	27	53.94845908(38)	1952	193.27(6) ms	β^{+}	^{54}Fe	0+	
^{54m}Co	197.57(10) keV			1967	1.48(2) min	β^{+}	^{54}Fe	7+	
^{55}Co	27	28	54.94199642(43)	1938	17.53(3) h	β^{+}	^{55}Fe	7/2−	
^{56}Co	27	29	55.93983803(51)	1941	77.236(26) d	β^{+}	^{56}Fe	4+	
^{57}Co	27	30	56.93628982(55)	1941	271.811(32) d	EC	^{57}Fe	7/2−	
^{58}Co	27	31	57.9357513(12)	1941	70.844(20) d	EC (85.21%)	^{58}Fe	2+	
^{58}Co	27	31	57.9357513(12)	1941	70.844(20) d	β^{+} (14.79%)	^{58}Fe	2+	
^{58m1}Co	24.95(6) keV			1950	8.853(23) h	IT (99.9988%)	^{58}Co	5+	
^{58m1}Co	24.95(6) keV			1950	8.853(23) h	EC (0.00120%)	^{58}Fe	5+	
^{58m2}Co	53.15(7) keV			1964	10.5(3) μs	IT	^{58}Co	4+	
^{59}Co	27	32	58.93319352(43)	1923	Stable			7/2−	1.0000
^{60}Co	27	33	59.93381554(43)	1941	5.2714(6) y	β^{−}	^{60}Ni	5+	trace
^{60m}Co	58.59(1) keV			1941	10.467(6) min	IT (99.75%)	^{60}Co	2+	
^{60m}Co	58.59(1) keV			1941	10.467(6) min	β^{−} (0.25%)	^{60}Ni	2+	
^{61}Co	27	34	60.93247603(90)	1947	1.649(5) h	β^{−}	^{61}Ni	7/2−	
^{62}Co	27	35	61.934058(20)	1949	1.54(10) min	β^{−}	^{62}Ni	(2)+	
^{62m}Co	22(5) keV			1949	13.86(9) min	β^{−} (>99.5%)	^{62}Ni	(5)+	
^{62m}Co	22(5) keV			1949	13.86(9) min	IT (<0.5%)	^{62}Co	(5)+	
^{63}Co	27	36	62.933600(20)	1960	26.9(4) s	β^{−}	^{63}Ni	7/2−	
^{64}Co	27	37	63.935810(21)	1969	300(30) ms	β^{−}	^{64}Ni	1+	
^{64m}Co	107(20) keV			2010	300# ms	β^{−}?	^{64}Ni	5+#	
^{64m}Co	107(20) keV			2010	300# ms	IT?	^{64}Co	5+#	
^{65}Co	27	38	64.9364621(22)	1978	1.16(3) s	β^{−}	^{65}Ni	(7/2)−	
^{66}Co	27	39	65.939443(15)	1985	194(17) ms	β^{−}	^{66}Ni	(1+)	
^{66}Co	27	39	65.939443(15)	1985	194(17) ms	β^{−}, n?	^{65}Ni	(1+)	
^{66m1}Co	175.1(3) keV			1998	824(22) ns	IT	^{66}Co	(3+)	
^{66m2}Co	642(5) keV			1998	>100 μs	IT	^{66}Co	(8−)	
^{67}Co	27	40	66.9406096(69)	1985	329(28) ms	β^{−}	^{67}Ni	(7/2−)	
^{67}Co	27	40	66.9406096(69)	1985	329(28) ms	β^{−}, n?	^{66}Ni	(7/2−)	
^{67m}Co	491.55(11) keV			2008	496(33) ms	IT (>80%)	^{67}Co	(1/2−)	
^{67m}Co	491.55(11) keV			2008	496(33) ms	β^{−}	^{67}Ni	(1/2−)	
^{68}Co	27	41	67.9445594(41)	1985	200(20) ms	β^{−}	^{68}Ni	(7−)	
^{68}Co	27	41	67.9445594(41)	1985	200(20) ms	β^{−}, n?	^{67}Ni	(7−)	
^{68m1}Co (Note: Order of ground state and isomer is uncertain.)	150(150)# keV			2000	1.6(3) s	β^{−}	^{68}Ni	(2−)	
^{68m1}Co	150(150)# keV			2000	1.6(3) s	β^{−}, n (>2.6%)	^{67}Ni	(2−)	
^{68m2}Co	195(150)# keV			2010	101(10) ns	IT	^{68}Co	(1)	
^{69}Co	27	42	68.945909(92)	1985	180(20) ms	β^{−}	^{69}Ni	(7/2−)	
^{69}Co	27	42	68.945909(92)	1985	180(20) ms	β^{−}, n?	^{68}Ni	(7/2−)	
^{69m}Co	170(90) keV			2015	750(250) ms	β^{−}	^{69}Ni	1/2−#	
^{70}Co	27	43	69.950053(12)	1985	508(7) ms	β^{−}	^{70}Ni	(1+)	
^{70}Co	27	43	69.950053(12)	1985	508(7) ms	β^{−}, n?	^{69}Ni	(1+)	
^{70}Co	27	43	69.950053(12)	1985	508(7) ms	β^{−}, 2n?	^{68}Ni	(1+)	
^{70m}Co	200(200)# keV			2000	112(7) ms	β^{−}	^{70}Ni	(7−)	
^{70m}Co	200(200)# keV			2000	112(7) ms	IT?	^{70}Co	(7−)	
^{70m}Co	200(200)# keV			2000	112(7) ms	β^{−}, n?	^{69}Ni	(7−)	
^{70m}Co	200(200)# keV			2000	112(7) ms	β^{−}, 2n?	^{68}Ni	(7−)	
^{71}Co	27	44	70.95237(50)	1992	80(3) ms	β^{−} (97%)	^{71}Ni	(7/2−)	
^{71}Co	27	44	70.95237(50)	1992	80(3) ms	β^{−}, n (3%)	^{70}Ni	(7/2−)	
^{72}Co	27	45	71.95674(32)#	1992	51.5(3) ms	β^{−} (<96%)	^{72}Ni	(6−,7−)	
^{72}Co	27	45	71.95674(32)#	1992	51.5(3) ms	β^{−}, n (>4%)	^{71}Ni	(6−,7−)	
^{72}Co	27	45	71.95674(32)#	1992	51.5(3) ms	β^{−}, 2n?	^{70}Ni	(6−,7−)	
^{72m}Co	200(200)# keV			2016	47.8(5) ms	β^{−}	^{72}Ni	(0+,1+)	
^{73}Co	27	46	72.95924(32)#	1995	42.0(8) ms	β^{−} (94%)	^{73}Ni	(7/2−)	
^{73}Co	27	46	72.95924(32)#	1995	42.0(8) ms	β^{−}, n (6%)	^{72}Ni	(7/2−)	
^{73}Co	27	46	72.95924(32)#	1995	42.0(8) ms	β^{−}, 2n?	^{71}Ni	(7/2−)	
^{74}Co	27	47	73.96399(43)#	1995	31.3(13) ms	β^{−} (82%)	^{74}Ni	7−#	
^{74}Co	27	47	73.96399(43)#	1995	31.3(13) ms	β^{−}, n (18%)	^{73}Ni	7−#	
^{74}Co	27	47	73.96399(43)#	1995	31.3(13) ms	β^{−}, 2n?	^{72}Ni	7−#	
^{75}Co	27	48	74.96719(43)#	1995	26.5(12) ms	β^{−} (>84%)	^{75}Ni	7/2−#	
^{75}Co	27	48	74.96719(43)#	1995	26.5(12) ms	β^{−}, n (<16%)	^{74}Ni	7/2−#	
^{75}Co	27	48	74.96719(43)#	1995	26.5(12) ms	β^{−}, 2n?	^{73}Ni	7/2−#	
^{75m}Co	1914(2) keV			2021	13(6) μs	IT	^{75}Co	(1/2)−	
^{76}Co	27	49	75.97245(54)#	2010	23(6) ms	β^{−}	^{76}Ni	(8−)	
^{76}Co	27	49	75.97245(54)#	2010	23(6) ms	β^{−}, n?	^{75}Ni	(8−)	
^{76}Co	27	49	75.97245(54)#	2010	23(6) ms	β^{−}, 2n?	^{74}Ni	(8−)	
^{76m1}Co	100(100)# keV			2015	16(4) ms	β^{−}	^{76}Ni	(1−)	
^{76m2}Co	740(100)# keV			2015	2.99(27) μs	IT	^{76}Co	(3+)	
^{77}Co	27	50	76.97648(64)#	2014	15(6) ms	β^{−}	^{77}Ni	7/2−#	
^{77}Co	27	50	76.97648(64)#	2014	15(6) ms	β^{−}, n?	^{76}Ni	7/2−#	
^{77}Co	27	50	76.97648(64)#	2014	15(6) ms	β^{−}, 2n?	^{75}Ni	7/2−#	
^{77}Co	27	50	76.97648(64)#	2014	15(6) ms	β^{−}, 3n?	^{74}Ni	7/2−#	
^{78}Co	27	51	77.983 55(75)#	2017	11# ms [>410 ns]	β^{−}?	^{78}Ni		
^{79}Co	27	52		2026					
^{80}Co	27	53		2026					
This table header & footer:

== Stellar nucleosynthesis of cobalt-56 ==
One of the terminal nuclear reactions in stars prior to supernova produces ^{56}Ni. ^{56}Ni then decays to ^{56}Co, which then decays to ^{56}Fe. These decays power the luminosity displayed in light decay curves. Both the light decay and radioactive decay curves are expected to be exponential. Therefore, the light decay curve should give an indication of the nuclear reactions powering it. This has been confirmed by observation of bolometric light decay curves for SN 1987A. Between 600 and 800 days after SN1987A occurred, the bolometric light curve decreased at an exponential rate with half-life values from 68.6 days to 69.6 days. The rate at which the luminosity decreased closely matched that expected of exponential decay of ^{56}Co.

== Cobalt-57 ==
Cobalt-57 (^{57}Co or Co-57) is used in medical tests; it is used as a radiolabel for vitamin B_{12} uptake. It is useful for the Schilling test.

^{57}Co is used as a source of gamma rays in Mössbauer spectroscopy of iron-containing samples. Electron capture by ^{57}Co forms an excited state of the ^{57}Fe nucleus, which in turn decays to the ground state with the emission of a gamma ray. Measurement of the gamma-ray spectrum provides information about the chemical state of the iron atom in the sample.

== Cobalt-60 ==
Cobalt-60 (^{60}Co or Co-60) is used in radiotherapy. It produces two gamma rays with energies of 1.17 MeV and 1.33 MeV. The ^{60}Co source is about 2 cm in diameter and as a result produces a geometric penumbra, making the edge of the radiation field fuzzy. The metal has the unfortunate habit of producing fine dust, causing problems with radiation protection. The ^{60}Co source is useful for about 5 years but even after this point is still very radioactive, and so cobalt machines have fallen from favor in the Western world where linacs are more usual.

Cobalt-60 (^{60}Co) is useful as an industrial gamma ray source also: uses for industrial cobalt include

- Sterilization of medical supplies and medical waste
- Radiation treatment of foods for sterilization (cold pasteurization)
- Industrial radiography (e.g., weld integrity radiographs)
- Density measurements (e.g., concrete density measurements)
- Tank fill height switches

== See also ==
Daughter products other than cobalt

- Isotopes of nickel
- Isotopes of iron
- Isotopes of manganese
- Isotopes of chromium
