= Electron capture =

Process in which a proton-rich nuclide absorbs an inner atomic electron

Scheme of two types of electron capture. Top: The nucleus absorbs an electron. Lower left: An outer electron replaces the "missing" electron. Electromagnetic radiation equal in energy to the difference between the two electron shells is emitted. Lower right: In the Auger effect, the energy absorbed when the outer electron replaces the inner electron is transferred to an outer electron. The outer electron is ejected from the atom, leaving a positive ion.

Electron capture (K-electron capture, also K-capture, or L-electron capture, L-capture) is a process in which the proton-rich nucleus of an electrically neutral atom absorbs an inner atomic electron, usually from the K or L electron shells. This process thereby changes a nuclear proton to a neutron and simultaneously causes the emission of an electron neutrino.

p + e^{−} → n + ν_{e}

or when written as a nuclear reaction equation,

$\ce{^{0}_{-1}e + ^{1}_{1}p -> ^{1}_{0}n + ^{0}_{0}}$ν$_e$

Since this single emitted neutrino carries the entire decay energy, it has this single characteristic energy. Similarly, the momentum of the neutrino emission causes the daughter atom to recoil with a single characteristic momentum.

The resulting daughter nuclide, if it is in an excited state, then transitions to its ground state. Usually, a gamma ray is emitted during this transition, but nuclear de-excitation may also take place by internal conversion.

Following capture of an inner electron from the atom, an outer electron replaces the electron that was captured and one or more characteristic X-ray photons is emitted in this process. Electron capture sometimes also results in the Auger effect, where an electron is ejected from the atom's electron shell due to interactions between the atom's electrons in the process of seeking a lower energy electron state.

Following electron capture, the atomic number is reduced by one, the neutron number is increased by one, and there is no change in mass number. Simple electron capture by itself results in a neutral atom, since the loss of the electron in the electron shell is balanced by a loss of positive nuclear charge. However, a positive atomic ion may result from further Auger electron emission.

Electron capture is an example of weak interaction, one of the four fundamental forces.

Electron capture is the primary decay mode for isotopes with a relative superabundance of protons in the nucleus, but with insufficient energy difference between the isotope and its prospective daughter (the isobar with one less positive charge) for the nuclide to decay by emitting a positron. Electron capture is always an alternative decay mode for radioactive isotopes that do have sufficient energy to decay by positron emission. Electron capture is sometimes included as a type of beta decay, because the basic nuclear process, mediated by the weak force, is the same. In nuclear physics, beta decay is a type of radioactive decay in which a beta ray (fast energetic electron or positron) and a neutrino are emitted from an atomic nucleus. Electron capture is sometimes called inverse beta decay, though this term usually refers to the interaction of an electron antineutrino with a proton.

If the energy difference between the parent atom and the daughter atom is less than 1.022 MeV, positron emission is forbidden as not enough decay energy is available to allow it, and thus electron capture is the sole decay mode. For example, rubidium-83 (37 protons, 46 neutrons) will decay to krypton-83 (36 protons, 47 neutrons) solely by electron capture (the energy difference, or decay energy, is about 0.9 MeV).

== History ==
The theory of electron capture was first discussed by Gian-Carlo Wick in a 1934 paper, and then developed by Hideki Yukawa and others. K-electron capture was first observed by Luis Alvarez, in vanadium, ^{48}V, which he reported in 1937. Alvarez went on to study electron capture in gallium (^{67}Ga) and other nuclides.

== Reaction details ==
The leading-order Feynman diagrams for electron capture decay. An electron interacts with an up quark in the nucleus via a W boson to create a down quark and electron neutrino. Two diagrams comprise the leading (second) order, though as a virtual particle, the type (and charge) of the W-boson is indistinguishable.

The electron that is captured is one of the atom's own electrons, and not a new, incoming electron, as might be suggested by the way the reactions are written below. A few examples of electron capture are:

^{26}_{13}Al	+ e^{−} →	^{26}_{12}Mg	+ ν_{e}
^{59}_{28}Ni	+ e^{−} →	^{59}_{27}Co	+ ν_{e}
^{40}_{19}K	+ e^{−} →	^{40}_{18}Ar	+ ν_{e}

Radioactive isotopes that decay by pure electron capture can be inhibited from radioactive decay if they are fully ionized ("stripped" is sometimes used to describe such ions). It is hypothesized that such elements, if formed by the r-process in exploding supernovae, are ejected fully ionized and so do not undergo radioactive decay as long as they do not encounter electrons in outer space. Anomalies in elemental distributions are thought to be partly a result of this effect on electron capture. Inverse decays can also be induced by full ionisation; for instance, ^{163}Ho decays into ^{163}Dy by electron capture; however, a fully ionised ^{163}Dy decays into a bound state of ^{163}Ho by the process of bound-state β^{−} decay.

Chemical bonds can also affect the rate of electron capture to a small degree (in general, less than 1%) depending on the proximity of electrons to the nucleus. For example, in ^{7}Be, a difference of 0.9% has been observed between half-lives in metallic and insulating environments. This relatively large effect is because beryllium is a small atom that employs valence electrons that are close to the nucleus, and also in orbitals with no orbital angular momentum. Electrons in s orbitals (regardless of shell or primary quantum number), have a probability antinode at the nucleus, and are thus far more subject to electron capture than p or d electrons, which have a probability node at the nucleus.

Around the elements in the middle of the periodic table, isotopes that are lighter than stable isotopes of the same element tend to decay through electron capture, while isotopes heavier than the stable ones decay by electron emission. Electron capture happens most often in the heavier neutron-deficient elements where the mass change is smallest and positron emission is not always possible. When the loss of mass in a nuclear reaction is greater than zero but less than 2m_{e}c^{2} the process cannot occur by positron emission, but occurs spontaneously for electron capture.

== Common examples ==
Some common radionuclides that decay solely by electron capture include (a = annum or year):

Nuclide	Half-life
^{7}_{4}Be	53.28 d
^{37}_{18}Ar	35.0 d
^{41}_{20}Ca	1.03×10^{5} a
^{44}_{22}Ti	60 a
^{49}_{23}V	337 d

Nuclide	Half-life
^{51}_{24}Cr	27.7 d
^{53}_{25}Mn	3.7×10^{6} a
^{55}_{26}Fe	2.6 a
^{57}_{27}Co	271.8 d
^{59}_{28}Ni	7.5×10^{4} a

Nuclide	Half-life
^{67}_{31}Ga	3.260 d
^{68}_{32}Ge	270.8 d
^{72}_{34}Se	8.5 d

For a full list, see the table of nuclides.

== See also ==
- Chandrasekhar limit
- Muon capture
