= Isotopes of nickel =

Isotopes of nickel (_{28}Ni)
Main isotopes			Decay	
Isotope	abundance	half-life (t_{1/2})	mode	product
^{56}Ni	synth	6.075 d	β^{+}	^{56}Co
^{57}Ni	synth	35.60 h	β^{+}	^{57}Co
^{58}Ni	68.1%	stable		
^{59}Ni	trace	8.1×10^{4} y	ε	^{59}Co
^{60}Ni	26.2%	stable		
^{61}Ni	1.14%	stable		
^{62}Ni	3.63%	stable		
^{63}Ni	synth	101 y	β^{−}	^{63}Cu
^{64}Ni	0.926%	stable		

Standard atomic weight A_{r}°(Ni)
- 58.6934±0.0004; 58.693±0.001 (abridged)

Naturally occurring nickel (_{28}Ni) consists of five stable isotopes; ^{58}Ni, ^{60}Ni, ^{61}Ni, ^{62}Ni and ^{64}Ni; ^{58}Ni is the most abundant at over 68%. 26 radioisotopes have been characterized; the most stable are ^{59}Ni with a half-life of 81,000 years, ^{63}Ni with a half-life of 101 years, and ^{56}Ni at 6.075 days. All the other radioactive isotopes have half-lives of less than 60 hours and most of these have half-lives of less than 30 seconds. This element also has 11 known meta states.

== List of isotopes ==
Nuclide (Note: ^{m}Ni – Excited nuclear isomer.)	Z	N	Isotopic mass (Da) (Note: ( ) – Uncertainty (1σ) is given in concise form in parentheses after the corresponding last digits.) (Note: # – Atomic mass marked #: value and uncertainty derived not from purely experimental data, but at least partly from trends from the Mass Surface (TMS).)	Discovery year	Half-life (Note: # – Values marked # are not purely derived from experimental data, but at least partly from trends of neighboring nuclides (TNN).)	Decay mode (Note: Modes of decay: EC: / Electron capture; IT: / Isomeric transition; n: / Neutron emission)	Daughter isotope (Note: Bold symbol as daughter – Daughter product is stable.)	Spin and parity (Note: ( ) spin value – Indicates spin with weak assignment arguments.)	Natural abundance (mole fraction)	
Nuclide	Excitation energy			Discovery year	Half-life	Decay mode	Daughter isotope	Spin and parity	Normal proportion	Range of variation
^{48}Ni	28	20	48.01952(46)#	2000	2.8(8) ms	2p (70%)	^{46}Fe	0+		
^{48}Ni	28	20	48.01952(46)#	2000	2.8(8) ms	β^{+}, p (30%)	^{47}Fe	0+		
^{49}Ni	28	21	49.00916(64)#	1996	7.5(10) ms	β^{+}, p	^{48}Fe	7/2−#		
^{50}Ni	28	22	49.99629(54)#	1994	18.5(12) ms	β^{+}, p (73%)	^{49}Fe	0+		
^{50}Ni	28	22	49.99629(54)#	1994	18.5(12) ms	β^{+}, 2p (14%)	^{48}Mn	0+		
^{50}Ni	28	22	49.99629(54)#	1994	18.5(12) ms	β^{+} (13%)	^{50}Co	0+		
^{51}Ni	28	23	50.98749(54)#	1987	23.8(2) ms	β^{+}, p (87.2%)	^{50}Fe	7/2−#		
^{51}Ni	28	23	50.98749(54)#	1987	23.8(2) ms	β^{+} (12.3%)	^{51}Co	7/2−#		
^{51}Ni	28	23	50.98749(54)#	1987	23.8(2) ms	β^{+}, 2p (0.5%)	^{49}Mn	7/2−#		
^{52}Ni	28	24	51.975781(89)	1987	41.8(10) ms	β^{+} (68.9%)	^{52}Co	0+		
^{52}Ni	28	24	51.975781(89)	1987	41.8(10) ms	β^{+}, p (31.1%)	^{51}Fe	0+		
^{53}Ni	28	25	52.968190(27)	1976	55.2(7) ms	β^{+} (77.3%)	^{53}Co	(7/2−)		
^{53}Ni	28	25	52.968190(27)	1976	55.2(7) ms	β^{+}, p (22.7%)	^{52}Fe	(7/2−)		
^{54}Ni	28	26	53.9578330(50)	1977	114.1(3) ms	β^{+}	^{54}Co	0+		
^{54}Ni	28	26	53.9578330(50)	1977	114.1(3) ms	β^{+}, p?	^{53}Fe	0+		
^{54m}Ni	6457.4(9) keV			2008	152(4) ns	IT (64%)	^{54}Ni	10+		
^{54m}Ni	6457.4(9) keV			2008	152(4) ns	p (36%)	^{53}Co	10+		
^{55}Ni	28	27	54.95132985(76)	1972	203.9(13) ms	β^{+}	^{55}Co	7/2−		
^{56}Ni	28	28	55.94212776(43)	1952	6.075(10) d	EC	^{56}Co	0+		
^{56}Ni	28	28	55.94212776(43)	1952	6.075(10) d	β^{+} (<5.8×10^{−5}%)	^{56}Co	0+		
^{57}Ni	28	29	56.93979139(61)	1938	35.60(6) h	β^{+}	^{57}Co	3/2−		
^{58}Ni	28	30	57.93534165(37)	1921	Observationally stable (Note: Believed to decay by β^{+}β^{+} to ^{58}Fe with a half-life over 7×10^{20} years)			0+	0.680769(190)	
^{59}Ni	28	31	58.93434544(38)	1951	8.1(5)×10^{4} y	EC (99%)	^{59}Co	3/2−		
^{59}Ni	28	31	58.93434544(38)	1951	8.1(5)×10^{4} y	β^{+} (1.5×10^{−5}%)	^{59}Co	3/2−		
^{60}Ni	28	32	59.93078513(38)	1921	Stable			0+	0.262231(150)	
^{61}Ni	28	33	60.93105482(38)	1934	Stable			3/2−	0.011399(13)	
^{62}Ni (Note: Highest binding energy per nucleon of all nuclides)	28	34	61.92834475(46)	1934	Stable			0+	0.036345(40)	
^{63}Ni	28	35	62.92966902(46)	1951	101.2(15) y	β^{−}	^{63}Cu	1/2−		
^{63m}Ni	87.15(11) keV			1970	1.67(3) μs	IT	^{63}Ni	5/2−		
^{64}Ni	28	36	63.92796623(50)	1935	Stable			0+	0.009256(19)	
^{65}Ni	28	37	64.93008459(52)	1946	2.5175(5) h	β^{−}	^{65}Cu	5/2−		
^{65m}Ni	63.37(5) keV			1978	69(3) μs	IT	^{65}Ni	1/2−		
^{66}Ni	28	38	65.9291393(15)	1948	54.6(3) h	β^{−}	^{66}Cu	0+		
^{67}Ni	28	39	66.9315694(31)	1978	21(1) s	β^{−}	^{67}Cu	1/2−		
^{67m}Ni	1006.6(2) keV			1994	13.34(19) μs	IT	^{67}Ni	9/2+		
^{68}Ni	28	40	67.9318688(32)	1977	29(2) s	β^{−}	^{68}Cu	0+		
^{68m1}Ni	1603.51(28) keV			1984	270(5) ns	IT	^{68}Ni	0+		
^{68m2}Ni	2849.1(3) keV			1995	850(30) μs	IT	^{68}Ni	5−		
^{69}Ni	28	41	68.9356103(40)	1984	11.4(3) s	β^{−}	^{69}Cu	(9/2+)		
^{69m1}Ni	321(2) keV			1999	3.5(4) s	β^{−}	^{69}Cu	(1/2−)		
^{69m1}Ni	321(2) keV			1999	3.5(4) s	IT (<0.01%)	^{69}Ni	(1/2−)		
^{69m2}Ni	2700.0(10) keV			1998	439(3) ns	IT	^{69}Ni	(17/2−)		
^{70}Ni	28	42	69.9364313(23)	1987	6.0(3) s	β^{−}	^{70}Cu	0+		
^{70m}Ni	2860.91(8) keV			1998	232(1) ns	IT	^{70}Ni	8+		
^{71}Ni	28	43	70.9405190(24)	1987	2.56(3) s	β^{−}	^{71}Cu	(9/2+)		
^{71m}Ni	499(5) keV			2009	2.3(3) s	β^{−}	^{71}Cu	(1/2−)		
^{72}Ni	28	44	71.9417859(24)	1987	1.57(5) s	β^{−}	^{72}Cu	0+		
^{72}Ni	28	44	71.9417859(24)	1987	1.57(5) s	β^{−}, n?	^{71}Cu	0+		
^{73}Ni	28	45	72.9462067(26)	1987	840(30) ms	β^{−}	^{73}Cu	(9/2+)		
^{73}Ni	28	45	72.9462067(26)	1987	840(30) ms	β^{−}, n?	^{72}Cu	(9/2+)		
^{74}Ni	28	46	73.9479853(38)	1987	507.7(46) ms	β^{−}	^{74}Cu	0+		
^{74}Ni	28	46	73.9479853(38)	1987	507.7(46) ms	β^{−}, n?	^{73}Cu	0+		
^{75}Ni	28	47	74.952704(16)	1992	331.6(32) ms	β^{−} (90.0%)	^{75}Cu	9/2+#		
^{75}Ni	28	47	74.952704(16)	1992	331.6(32) ms	β^{−}, n (10.0%)	^{74}Cu	9/2+#		
^{76}Ni	28	48	75.95471(32)#	1995	234.6(27) ms	β^{−} (86.0%)	^{76}Cu	0+		
^{76}Ni	28	48	75.95471(32)#	1995	234.6(27) ms	β^{−}, n (14.0%)	^{75}Cu	0+		
^{76m}Ni	2418.0(5) keV			2005	547.8(33) ns	IT	^{76}Ni	(8+)		
^{77}Ni	28	49	76.95990(43)#	1995	158.9(42) ms	β^{−} (74%)	^{77}Cu	9/2+#		
^{77}Ni	28	49	76.95990(43)#	1995	158.9(42) ms	β^{−}, n (26%)	^{76}Cu	9/2+#		
^{77}Ni	28	49	76.95990(43)#	1995	158.9(42) ms	β^{−}, 2n?	^{75}Cu	9/2+#		
^{78}Ni	28	50	77.96256(43)#	1995	122.2(51) ms	β^{−}	^{78}Cu	0+		
^{78}Ni	28	50	77.96256(43)#	1995	122.2(51) ms	β^{−}, n?	^{77}Cu	0+		
^{78}Ni	28	50	77.96256(43)#	1995	122.2(51) ms	β^{−}, 2n?	^{76}Cu	0+		
^{79}Ni	28	51	78.96977(54)#	2010	44(8) ms	β^{−}	^{79}Cu	5/2+#		
^{79}Ni	28	51	78.96977(54)#	2010	44(8) ms	β^{−}, n?	^{78}Cu	5/2+#		
^{79}Ni	28	51	78.96977(54)#	2010	44(8) ms	β^{−}, 2n?	^{77}Cu	5/2+#		
^{80}Ni	28	52	79.97505(64)#	2014	30(22) ms	β^{−}	^{80}Cu	0+		
^{80}Ni	28	52	79.97505(64)#	2014	30(22) ms	β^{−}, n?	^{79}Cu	0+		
^{80}Ni	28	52	79.97505(64)#	2014	30(22) ms	β^{−}, 2n?	^{78}Cu	0+		
^{81}Ni	28	53	80.98273(75)#	2017	30# ms[>410 ns]	β^{−}?	^{81}Cu	3/2+#		
^{82}Ni	28	54	81.98849(86)#	2017	16# ms[>410 ns]	β^{−}?	^{82}Cu	0+		
This table header & footer:

== Notable isotopes ==
The known isotopes of nickel range in mass number from ^{48}Ni to ^{82}Ni, and include:

Nickel-48, discovered in 1999, is the most neutron-poor nickel isotope known. With 28 protons and 20 neutrons ^{48}Ni is "doubly magic" (like ^{208}Pb) and therefore much more stable, with a half-life around 3 milliseconds, than would be expected from its position in the chart of nuclides. It has the highest ratio of protons to neutrons (proton excess) of any known doubly magic nuclide.

Nickel-56, also doubly magic, is produced in large quantities in supernovae. In the last phases of stellar evolution of very large stars, fusion of lighter elements like hydrogen and helium comes to an end. Later in the star's life cycle, elements including magnesium, silicon, and sulfur are fused to form heavier elements. Once the last nuclear fusion reactions cease, the star collapses to produce a supernova. During the supernova, silicon burning produces ^{56}Ni. This isotope of nickel is favored because it has an equal number of neutrons and protons, making it readily produced by fusing two ^{28}Si atoms. ^{56}Ni is the last element that can be formed in the alpha process. Past ^{56}Ni, nuclear reactions are endoergic and energetically unfavorable. ^{56}Ni decays to ^{56}Co and then ^{56}Fe by β+ decay. The radioactive decay of ^{56}Ni and ^{56}Co supplies much of the energy for the light curves observed for stellar supernovae. The shape of the light curve of these supernovae display characteristic timescales corresponding to the decay of ^{56}Ni to ^{56}Co and then to ^{56}Fe.

Nickel-58 is the most abundant isotope of nickel with a 68.077% natural abundance. It is the only isotope theoretically unstable toward double beta decay.

Nickel-59 is a long-lived cosmogenic radionuclide with a half-life of 81,000 years. ^{59}Ni has found many applications in isotope geology. ^{59}Ni has been used to date the terrestrial age of meteorites and to determine abundances of extraterrestrial dust in ice and sediment.

Nickel-60 is the daughter product of the extinct radionuclide ^{60}Fe (half-life 2.62 My). Because ^{60}Fe has such a long half-life, its persistence in materials in the Solar System at high enough concentrations may have generated observable variations in the isotopic composition of ^{60}Ni. Therefore, the abundance of ^{60}Ni in extraterrestrial material may provide insight into the origin of the Solar System and its early history/very early history. Unfortunately, nickel isotopes appear to have been heterogeneously distributed in the early Solar System. Therefore, so far, no actual age information has been attained from ^{60}Ni excesses. ^{60}Ni is also the stable end-product of the decay of ^{60}Zn, the last rung of the alpha ladder.

Nickel-61 is the only stable isotope of nickel with a nuclear spin (I = 3/2), which makes it useful for studies by EPR spectroscopy.

Nickel-62 has the highest binding energy per nucleon of any isotope for any element, when including the electron shell in the calculation, though iron-56 has the lower mass-energy per nucleon. Though fusion could form heavier isotopes exothermically - for example, two ^{40}Ca atoms could make ^{80}Kr (with 4 positron decays) and liberate 77 keV per nucleon - reactions leading to the iron/nickel region are more probable as they release more energy in total.

Nickel-63 has two main uses: detection of explosives traces, and in certain kinds of electronic devices, such as gas discharge tubes used as surge protectors. A surge protector is a device that protects sensitive electronic equipment like computers from sudden changes in the electric current flowing into them. It is also used in electron capture detectors in gas chromatography for the detection mainly of halogens. It is proposed to be used for miniature betavoltaic generators for pacemakers.

Nickel-64 is the heaviest stable isotope of nickel.

Nickel-78 is one of the element's heaviest known isotopes. With 28 protons and 50 neutrons, nickel-78 is doubly magic, resulting in much greater nuclear binding energy and stability despite a lopsided neutron-proton ratio. Its half-life is 122 ± 5.1 milliseconds. Due to its magic neutron number, ^{78}Ni is believed to have an important role in supernova nucleosynthesis of elements heavier than iron. ^{78}Ni, along with N = 50 isotones ^{79}Cu and ^{80}Zn, are thought to constitute a waiting point in the r-process, where further neutron capture is delayed by the shell gap and a buildup of isotopes around A = 80 results.

== See also ==
Daughter products other than nickel

- Isotopes of copper
- Isotopes of cobalt
- Isotopes of iron
- Isotopes of manganese
