= Isotopes of chromium =

Isotopes of chromium (_{24}Cr)
Main isotopes			Decay	
Isotope	abundance	half-life (t_{1/2})	mode	product
^{50}Cr	4.34%	stable		
^{51}Cr	synth	27.7015 d	ε	^{51}V
^{52}Cr	83.8%	stable		
^{53}Cr	9.50%	stable		
^{54}Cr	2.37%	stable		

Standard atomic weight A_{r}°(Cr)
- 51.9961±0.0006; 51.996±0.001 (abridged)

Naturally occurring chromium (_{24}Cr) is composed of four stable isotopes; ^{50}Cr, ^{52}Cr, ^{53}Cr, and ^{54}Cr with ^{52}Cr being the most abundant (83.789% natural abundance). Twenty-two radioisotopes, all synthetic, have been characterized, the most stable being ^{51}Cr with a half-life of 27.70 days. All of the remaining radioactive isotopes have half-lives less than a day and for the majority of these less than a minute. This element also has two very short-lived meta states: ^{45m}Cr and ^{59m}Cr.

^{53}Cr is the radiogenic decay product of ^{53}Mn. Chromium and manganese are found together sufficiently for measurement of both to find application in isotope geology. Mn-Cr isotope ratios reinforce the evidence from ^{26}Al and ^{107}Pd for the early history of the Solar System. Variations in ^{53}Cr/^{52}Cr and Mn/Cr ratios from several meteorites indicate a non-zero initial ^{53}Mn/^{55}Mn ratio, implying that Cr isotopic variation must result from in-situ decay of ^{53}Mn in differentiated planetary bodies. Hence ^{53}Cr provides additional evidence for nucleosynthetic processes immediately before coalescence of the Solar System.

Chromium isotope ratios also allow its abundance in seawater sediments to be used as a proxy for atmospheric oxygen concentrations, as rates of certain leaching reactions exhibit variation.

The known isotopes of chromium range from ^{42}Cr to ^{70}Cr. The primary decay mode before the most abundant stable isotope, ^{52}Cr, is electron capture and the primary mode after is beta decay.

== List of isotopes ==
Nuclide (Note: ^{m}Cr – Excited nuclear isomer.)	Z	N	Isotopic mass (Da) (Note: ( ) – Uncertainty (1σ) is given in concise form in parentheses after the corresponding last digits.) (Note: # – Atomic mass marked #: value and uncertainty derived not from purely experimental data, but at least partly from trends from the Mass Surface (TMS).)	Discovery year	Half-life (Note: # – Values marked # are not purely derived from experimental data, but at least partly from trends of neighboring nuclides (TNN).)	Decay mode (Note: Modes of decay: EC: / Electron capture; IT: / Isomeric transition; p: / Proton emission)	Daughter isotope (Note: Bold symbol as daughter – Daughter product is stable.)	Spin and parity (Note: ( ) spin value – Indicates spin with weak assignment arguments.)	Natural abundance (mole fraction)	
Nuclide	Excitation energy			Discovery year	Half-life	Decay mode	Daughter isotope	Spin and parity	Normal proportion	Range of variation
^{42}Cr	24	18	42.00758(32)#	1996	13.3(10) ms	β^{+}, p	^{41}Ti	0+		
^{43}Cr	24	19	42.99789(22)#	1992	21.1(3) ms	β^{+}, p (79.3%)	^{42}Ti	(3/2+)		
^{43}Cr	24	19	42.99789(22)#	1992	21.1(3) ms	β^{+}, 2p (11.6%)	^{41}Sc	(3/2+)		
^{43}Cr	24	19	42.99789(22)#	1992	21.1(3) ms	β^{+} (8.97%)	^{43}V	(3/2+)		
^{43}Cr	24	19	42.99789(22)#	1992	21.1(3) ms	β^{+}, 3p (0.13%)	^{40}Ca	(3/2+)		
^{44}Cr	24	20	43.985591(55)	1987	42.8(6) ms	β^{+} (88%)	^{44}V	0+		
^{44}Cr	24	20	43.985591(55)	1987	42.8(6) ms	β^{+}, p (12%)	^{43}Ti	0+		
^{45}Cr	24	21	44.979050(38)	1974	60.9(4) ms	β^{+} (65.6%)	^{45}V	7/2−#		
^{45}Cr	24	21	44.979050(38)	1974	60.9(4) ms	β^{+}, p (34.4%)	^{44}Ti	7/2−#		
^{45m}Cr (Note: Order of ground state and isomer is uncertain.)	107(1) keV			2011	>80 μs	IT	^{45}Cr	(3/2)		
^{46}Cr	24	22	45.9683549(28)	1972	224.3(13) ms	β^{+}	^{46}V	0+		
^{47}Cr	24	23	46.9628950(56)	1972	461.6(15) ms	β^{+}	^{47}V	3/2−		
^{48}Cr	24	24	47.9540294(78)	1952	21.56(3) h	β^{+}	^{48}V	0+		
^{49}Cr	24	25	48.9513337(24)	1942	42.3(1) min	β^{+}	^{49}V	5/2−		
^{50}Cr	24	26	49.94604221(10)	1930	Observationally Stable (Note: Suspected of decaying by double β^{+} decay to ^{50}Ti with a half-life of no less than 1.3×10^{18} years)			0+	0.04345(13)	
^{51}Cr	24	27	50.94476539(18)	1940	27.7015(11) d	EC	^{51}V	7/2−		
^{52}Cr	24	28	51.94050471(12)	1923	Stable			0+	0.83789(18)	
^{53}Cr	24	29	52.94064630(12)	1930	Stable			3/2−	0.09501(17)	
^{54}Cr	24	30	53.93887736(14)	1930	Stable			0+	0.02365(7)	
^{55}Cr	24	31	54.94083664(25)	1952	3.497(3) min	β^{−}	^{55}Mn	3/2−		
^{56}Cr	24	32	55.94064898(62)	1960	5.94(10) min	β^{−}	^{56}Mn	0+		
^{57}Cr	24	33	56.9436121(20)	1978	21.1(10) s	β^{−}	^{57}Mn	(3/2)−		
^{58}Cr	24	34	57.9441845(32)	1980	7.0(3) s	β^{−}	^{58}Mn	0+		
^{59}Cr	24	35	58.94834543(72)	1980	1.05(9) s	β^{−}	^{59}Mn	(1/2−)		
^{59m}Cr	502.7(11) keV			1998	96(20) μs	IT	^{59}Cr	(9/2+)		
^{60}Cr	24	36	59.9496417(12)	1980	490(10) ms	β^{−}	^{60}Mn	0+		
^{61}Cr	24	37	60.9543781(20)	1985	243(9) ms	β^{−}	^{61}Mn	(5/2−)		
^{62}Cr	24	38	61.9561429(37)	1985	206(12) ms	β^{−}	^{62}Mn	0+		
^{63}Cr	24	39	62.961161(78)	1992	129(2) ms	β^{−}	^{63}Mn	1/2−#		
^{64}Cr	24	40	63.96389(32)	1992	43(1) ms	β^{−}	^{64}Mn	0+		
^{65}Cr	24	41	64.96961(22)#	1997	27.5(21) ms	β^{−}	^{65}Mn	1/2−#		
^{66}Cr	24	42	65.97301(32)#	1997	23.8(18) ms	β^{−}	^{66}Mn	0+		
^{67}Cr	24	43	66.97931(43)#	1997	11# ms [>300 ns]			1/2−#		
^{68}Cr	24	44	67.98316(54)#	2009	10# ms [>620 ns]			0+		
^{69}Cr	24	45	68.98966(54)#	2013	6# ms [>620 ns]			7/2+#		
^{70}Cr	24	46	69.99395(64)#	2013	6# ms [>620 ns]			0+		
^{72}Cr	24	48		2026				0+		
This table header & footer:

== Chromium-51 ==
Chromium-51 is a synthetic radioactive isotope of chromium having a half-life of 27.70 days and decaying by electron capture and emitting a 320-keV gamma ray; it is used to label red blood cells for measurement of mass or volume, survival time, and sequestration studies, for the diagnosis of gastrointestinal bleeding, and to label platelets to study their survival. It has a role as a radioactive label. Chromium-51 has been used as a radioactive label for decades. It is used as a diagnostic radiopharmaceutical agent in nephrology to determine glomerular filtration rate, and in hematology to determine red blood cell volume or mass, study the red blood cell survival time and evaluate blood loss.

== See also ==
Daughter products other than chromium

- Isotopes of manganese
- Isotopes of vanadium
- Isotopes of titanium
- Isotopes of scandium
