= Isotopes of manganese =

Isotopes of manganese (_{25}Mn)
Main isotopes			Decay	
Isotope	abundance	half-life (t_{1/2})	mode	product
^{52}Mn	synth	5.591 d	β^{+}	^{52}Cr
^{53}Mn	trace	3.7×10^{6} y	ε	^{53}Cr
^{54}Mn	synth	312.08 d	ε	^{54}Cr
^{54}Mn	synth	312.08 d	β^{−}	^{54}Fe
^{54}Mn	synth	312.08 d	β^{+}	^{54}Cr
^{55}Mn	100%	stable		

Standard atomic weight A_{r}°(Mn)
- 54.938043±0.000002; 54.938±0.001 (abridged)

Naturally occurring manganese (_{25}Mn) is composed of one stable isotope, ^{55}Mn. Twenty-seven radioisotopes have been characterized, with the most stable being ^{53}Mn with a half-life of 3.7 million years, ^{54}Mn with a half-life of 312.08 days, and ^{52}Mn with a half-life of 5.591 days. All of the remaining radioactive isotopes have half-lives that are less than 3 hours and the majority of these have half-lives that are less than a minute. This element also has seven meta states.

Manganese is part of the iron group of elements, which are thought to be synthesized in massive stars shortly before supernova explosions. Because of its relatively short half-life, ^{53}Mn occurs on Earth only in tiny amounts due to the action of cosmic rays on iron in rocks.

As ^{53}Mn decays to ^{53}Cr, manganese isotopic analysis is typically combined with that of chromium and this has found application in isotope geology and radiometric dating. Mn−Cr isotopic ratios reinforce the evidence from ^{26}Al and ^{107}Pd for the early history of the Solar System. Variations in ^{53}Cr/^{52}Cr and Mn/Cr ratios from several meteorites indicate a non-zero initial ^{53}Mn/^{55}Mn ratio that implies Cr isotopic variations must result from in-situ decay of ^{53}Mn in differentiated planetary bodies. Hence ^{53}Mn provides additional evidence for nucleosynthetic processes shortly before coalescence of the Solar System.

The isotopes of manganese range from ^{46}Mn to ^{73}Mn. The primary decay mode before the most abundant stable isotope, ^{55}Mn, is electron capture and the primary mode after is beta decay.

== List of isotopes ==
Nuclide (Note: ^{m}Mn – Excited nuclear isomer.)	Z	N	Isotopic mass (Da) (Note: ( ) – Uncertainty (1σ) is given in concise form in parentheses after the corresponding last digits.) (Note: # – Atomic mass marked #: value and uncertainty derived not from purely experimental data, but at least partly from trends from the Mass Surface (TMS).)	Discovery year	Half-life	Decay mode (Note: Modes of decay: EC: / Electron capture; IT: / Isomeric transition; n: / Neutron emission; p: / Proton emission)	Daughter isotope (Note: Bold symbol as daughter – Daughter product is stable.)	Spin and parity (Note: ( ) spin value – Indicates spin with weak assignment arguments.) (Note: # – Values marked # are not purely derived from experimental data, but at least partly from trends of neighboring nuclides (TNN).)	Isotopic abundance
Nuclide	Excitation energy			Discovery year	Half-life	Decay mode	Daughter isotope	Spin and parity	Isotopic abundance
^{46}Mn	25	21	45.986669(93)	1987	36.2(4) ms	β^{+}, p (57.0%)	^{45}V	(4+)	
^{46}Mn	25	21	45.986669(93)	1987	36.2(4) ms	β^{+} (25%)	^{46}Cr	(4+)	
^{46}Mn	25	21	45.986669(93)	1987	36.2(4) ms	β^{+}, 2p (18%)	^{44}Ti	(4+)	
^{46}Mn	25	21	45.986669(93)	1987	36.2(4) ms	β^{+}, α?	^{42}Ti	(4+)	
^{47}Mn	25	22	46.975774(34)	1987	88.0(13) ms	β^{+}	^{47}Cr	5/2−#	
^{47}Mn	25	22	46.975774(34)	1987	88.0(13) ms	β^{+}, p? (<1.7%)	^{46}V	5/2−#	
^{48}Mn	25	23	47.9685488(72)	1987	158.1(22) ms	β^{+} (99.72%)	^{48}Cr	4+	
^{48}Mn	25	23	47.9685488(72)	1987	158.1(22) ms	β^{+}, p (0.28%)	^{47}V	4+	
^{48}Mn	25	23	47.9685488(72)	1987	158.1(22) ms	β^{+}, α (6×10^{−4}%)	^{44}Ti	4+	
^{49}Mn	25	24	48.9596134(24)	1970	382(7) ms	β^{+}	^{49}Cr	5/2−	
^{50}Mn	25	25	49.95423816(12)	1952	283.21(7) ms	β^{+}	^{50}Cr	0+	
^{50m}Mn	225.31(7) keV			1972	1.75(3) min	β^{+}	^{50}Cr	5+	
^{51}Mn	25	26	50.94820877(33)	1938	45.81(21) min	β^{+}	^{51}Cr	5/2−	
^{52}Mn	25	27	51.94555909(14)	1938	5.591(3) d	β^{+}	^{52}Cr	6+	
^{52m}Mn	377.749(5) keV			1938	21.1(2) min	β^{+} (98.22%)	^{52}Cr	2+	
^{52m}Mn	377.749(5) keV			1938	21.1(2) min	IT (1.78%)	^{52}Mn	2+	
^{53}Mn	25	28	52.94128750(37)	1955	3.7(4)×10^{6} y	EC	^{53}Cr	7/2−	trace
^{54}Mn	25	29	53.9403558(11)	1938	312.081(32) d	EC	^{54}Cr	3+	
^{54}Mn	25	29	53.9403558(11)	1938	312.081(32) d	β^{−} (9.3×10^{−5}%)	^{54}Fe	3+	
^{54}Mn	25	29	53.9403558(11)	1938	312.081(32) d	β^{+} (1.28×10^{−7}%)	^{54}Cr	3+	
^{55}Mn	25	30	54.93804304(28)	1923	Stable			5/2−	1.0000
^{56}Mn	25	31	55.93890282(31)	1934	2.5789(1) h	β^{−}	^{56}Fe	3+	
^{57}Mn	25	32	56.9382859(16)	1954	85.4(18) s	β^{−}	^{57}Fe	5/2−	
^{58}Mn	25	33	57.9400666(29)	1961	3.0(1) s	β^{−}	^{58}Fe	1+	
^{58m}Mn	71.77(5) keV			1969	65.4(5) s	β^{−}	^{58}Fe	4+	
^{58m}Mn	71.77(5) keV			1969	65.4(5) s	IT?	^{58}Mn	4+	
^{59}Mn	25	34	58.9403911(25)	1976	4.59(5) s	β^{−}	^{59}Fe	5/2−	
^{60}Mn	25	35	59.9431366(25)	1978	280(20) ms	β^{−}	^{60}Fe	1+	
^{60m}Mn	271.90(10) keV			1985	1.77(2) s	β^{−} (88.5%)	^{60}Fe	4+	
^{60m}Mn	271.90(10) keV			1985	1.77(2) s	IT (11.5%)	^{60}Mn	4+	
^{61}Mn	25	36	60.9444525(25)	1980	709(8) ms	β^{−}	^{61}Fe	5/2−	
^{61}Mn	25	36	60.9444525(25)	1980	709(8) ms	β^{−}, n?	^{60}Fe	5/2−	
^{62}Mn	25	37	61.9479074(70)	1983	92(13) ms	β^{−}	^{62}Fe	1+	
^{62}Mn	25	37	61.9479074(70)	1983	92(13) ms	β^{−}, n?	^{61}Fe	1+	
^{62m}Mn (Note: Order of ground state and isomer is uncertain.)	343(6) keV			1999	671(5) ms	β^{−}	^{62}Fe	4+	
^{62m}Mn	343(6) keV			1999	671(5) ms	β^{−}, n?	^{61}Fe	4+	
^{62m}Mn	343(6) keV			1999	671(5) ms	IT?	^{62}Mn	4+	
^{63}Mn	25	38	62.9496647(40)	1985	275(4) ms	β^{−}	^{63}Fe	5/2−	
^{63}Mn	25	38	62.9496647(40)	1985	275(4) ms	β^{−}, n?	^{62}Fe	5/2−	
^{64}Mn	25	39	63.9538494(38)	1985	88.8(24) ms	β^{−} (97.3%)	^{64}Fe	1+	
^{64}Mn	25	39	63.9538494(38)	1985	88.8(24) ms	β^{−}, n (2.7%)	^{63}Fe	1+	
^{64m}Mn	174.1(5) keV			1998	439(31) μs	IT	^{64}Mn	(4+)	
^{65}Mn	25	40	64.9560197(40)	1985	91.9(7) ms	β^{−} (92.1%)	^{65}Fe	(5/2−)	
^{65}Mn	25	40	64.9560197(40)	1985	91.9(7) ms	β^{−}, n (7.9%)	^{64}Fe	(5/2−)	
^{66}Mn	25	41	65.960547(12)	1992	63.8(9) ms	β^{−} (92.6%)	^{66}Fe	(1+)	
^{66}Mn	25	41	65.960547(12)	1992	63.8(9) ms	β^{−}, n (7.4%)	^{65}Fe	(1+)	
^{66}Mn	25	41	65.960547(12)	1992	63.8(9) ms	β^{−}, 2n?	^{64}Fe	(1+)	
^{66m}Mn	464.5(4) keV			2011	780(40) μs	IT	^{66}Mn	(5−)	
^{66m}Mn	464.5(4) keV			2011	780(40) μs	β^{−}?	^{66}Fe	(5−)	
^{67}Mn	25	42	66.96395(22)#	1997	46.7(23) ms	β^{−} (90%)	^{67}Fe	5/2−#	
^{67}Mn	25	42	66.96395(22)#	1997	46.7(23) ms	β^{−}, n (10%)	^{66}Fe	5/2−#	
^{67}Mn	25	42	66.96395(22)#	1997	46.7(23) ms	β^{−}, 2n?	^{65}Fe	5/2−#	
^{68}Mn	25	43	67.96895(32)#	1997	33.7(15) ms	β^{−} (82%)	^{68}Fe	(3)	
^{68}Mn	25	43	67.96895(32)#	1997	33.7(15) ms	β^{−}, n (18%)	^{67}Fe	(3)	
^{68}Mn	25	43	67.96895(32)#	1997	33.7(15) ms	β^{−}, 2n?	^{66}Fe	(3)	
^{69}Mn	25	44	68.97278(43)#	1997	22.1(16) ms	β^{−} (60%)	^{69}Fe	5/2−#	
^{69}Mn	25	44	68.97278(43)#	1997	22.1(16) ms	β^{−}, n (40%)	^{68}Fe	5/2−#	
^{69}Mn	25	44	68.97278(43)#	1997	22.1(16) ms	β^{−}, 2n?	^{67}Fe	5/2−#	
^{70}Mn	25	45	69.97805(54)#	2009	19.9(17) ms	β^{−}	^{70}Fe	(4,5)	
^{70}Mn	25	45	69.97805(54)#	2009	19.9(17) ms	β^{−}, n?	^{69}Fe	(4,5)	
^{70}Mn	25	45	69.97805(54)#	2009	19.9(17) ms	β^{−}, 2n?	^{68}Fe	(4,5)	
^{71}Mn	25	46	70.98216(54)#	2010	16# ms [>400 ns]	β^{−}?	^{71}Fe	5/2-#	
^{71}Mn	25	46	70.98216(54)#	2010	16# ms [>400 ns]	β^{−}, n?	^{70}Fe	5/2-#	
^{71}Mn	25	46	70.98216(54)#	2010	16# ms [>400 ns]	β^{−}, 2n?	^{69}Fe	5/2-#	
^{72}Mn	25	47	71.98801(64)#	2013	12# ms [>620 ns]	β^{−}?	^{72}Fe		
^{72}Mn	25	47	71.98801(64)#	2013	12# ms [>620 ns]	β^{−}, n?	^{71}Fe		
^{72}Mn	25	47	71.98801(64)#	2013	12# ms [>620 ns]	β^{−}, 2n?	^{70}Fe		
^{73}Mn	25	48	72.99281(64)#	2017	12# ms [>410 ns]	β^{−}?	^{73}Fe	5/2−#	
^{74}Mn	25	49		2026					
^{75}Mn	25	50		2026					
This table header & footer:

== See also ==
Daughter products other than manganese

- Isotopes of iron
- Isotopes of chromium
- Isotopes of vanadium
- Isotopes of titanium
