= List of nuclides =

This list of nuclides shows observed nuclides that either are stable or, if radioactive, have half-lives longer than one hour. This includes isotopes of the first 105 elements, except for 87 (francium), 102 (nobelium) and 104 (rutherfordium). More than 5,000 nuclides have been experimentally characterized, including isomers, of which this page presently includes 987.

== Introduction ==
Theoretical calculation for the proton and neutron drip lines show that there would be about 7,000 nuclides that are between the drip lines, and containing 2 to 120 protons.

There are presently 251 known stable nuclides. Many of these in theory could decay through spontaneous fission, alpha decay, double beta decay, etc. with a very long half-life, but this has not yet been observed. Thus, the number of stable nuclides is subject to change if some of these 251 have radioactive decay observed in the future. In this article, the "stable" nuclides are divided into three tables: one for nuclides that are theoretically stable (meaning no decay mode is possible) except to spontaneous fission, which is not considered plausible in this mass range; one for nuclides that can theoretically undergo forms of decay other than spontaneous fission but have no published lower bound on lifetime from experimental evaluations; and one for nuclides that can theoretically decay and have been examined without detecting any decay, allowing a lower bound to be published. In this last table, where a decay has been predicted theoretically but never observed experimentally (either directly or by finding an excess of the daughter), the theoretical decay mode is given in parentheses, and "> (lifetime in years)" is shown in the half-life column to show this lower limit in scientific notation. Such nuclides are considered to be "stable", also called "observationally stable" indicating the tentative nature of the conclusion, until some decay has been observed. For example, tellurium-123 was reported to be radioactive, but the same experimental group later retracted this report, and it is again listed as stable.

The next group is the primordial radioactive nuclides. These have been measured to be radioactive, or decay products have been identified in natural samples (tellurium-128, barium-130). There are 35 of these (see these nuclides), of which 25 have half-lives longer than 10^{13} years. For most of these 25, decay is difficult to observe, and for most purposes they can be regarded as effectively stable. Bismuth-209 is notable as it is the only naturally occurring isotope of an element long considered stable. The other 10, platinum-190, samarium-147, lanthanum-138, rubidium-87, rhenium-187, lutetium-176, thorium-232, uranium-238, potassium-40, and uranium-235, have half-lives between 7×10^{8} and 5×10^{11} years, which means they have undergone at least 0.5% depletion since the formation of the Solar System about 4.6×10^{9} years ago, but still exist on Earth in significant quantities. They are the primary source of radiogenic heating and radioactive decay products. Together, there are a total of 286 primordial nuclides. (Note: Two further nuclides, plutonium-244 and samarium-146, have half-lives just long enough (8.13×10^{7} and 9.20×10^{7} years) that they could have survived from the formation of the Solar System and be present on Earth in trace quantities (having survived 56 and 50 half-lives). They might therefore be considered primordial, but fall short of the detection threshold in studies so far.)

The list then covers the other radionuclides with half-lives longer than 1 hour, split into several tables in order of successively shorter lifetimes.

Some nuclides that have half-lives too short to be primordial can be detected in nature as a result of later production by natural processes, mostly in trace amounts. These include radionuclides occurring in the decay chains of primordial uranium and thorium (radiogenic nuclides), such as radon-222. Others are the products of interactions with energetic cosmic rays (the cosmogenic nuclides), such as carbon-14. This gives a total of about 350 naturally occurring nuclides, some of which are difficult to detect. Other nuclides may be occasionally produced naturally by rare cosmogenic interactions or as a result of other natural nuclear reactions (nucleogenic nuclides), and these are generally even less detectable.

Non-primordial nuclides may also be detected in the spectra of stars; technetium is well established, and others have been claimed. The remaining nuclides are known solely from artificial nuclear transmutations. Some, such as caesium-137 and krypton-85, are detected in the environment, but only (or practically only) from deliberate or accidental release of artificial production, as fission products (from nuclear weapons or nuclear reactors), for industrial or medical uses, or otherwise.

== List legend ==
Each group of radionuclides, starting with the longest-lived primordial radionuclides, is sorted by decreasing half-life, but the tables are sortable by other columns. All columns sort by usual lexicographical order; in the case of the nuclide column this gives order on the mass number A.

No. (number) column
A running positive integer for reference, equal to the position in the tables. This number may change in the future, especially for nuclides with short lives, as better half-life estimates become available.
Nuclide column
Nuclide identifiers are given by their atomic mass number A and the symbol for the corresponding chemical element (corresponding to the unique proton number). In the cases that this is not the ground state, this is indicated by a m for metastable appended to the mass number; the conventional numbers are further appended to distinguish multiple metastable states but '1' is omitted if the others are much less stable.
A, Z, N columns
The total number of protons and neutrons together (A) and the separate numbers of protons (Z) and of neutrons (N).
Energy column
The column labeled "energy" denotes the energy equivalent of (the mass of a neutron minus the mass per nucleon), that is of the mass defect with respect to the neutron, in MeV. Use of the neutron as reference guarantees all nuclides will have a positive value. Mathematically: m_{n} − m_{nuclide} / A. Note that this means that a higher "energy" value actually means that the nuclide has a lower energy. Inversely the mass is A (m_{n} − E / k) where E is the energy, m_{n} is 1.0086649159 and k = 931.4941037 MeV (energy equivalent of the dalton). Omitted if there is no experimental mass determination within 0.0001.
Half-life column
The first column shows times in seconds; the second column in the more usual units (years, days, hours). As the first column is converted from the second, it is given enough digits to ensure consistent sorting.
Entries starting with a ">" indicates that no decay has ever been observed, with experiments having established lower limits on the half-life. Such elements are considered stable unless decay is observed (establishing an actual estimate for the half-life). Half-lives are imprecise estimates and may be subject to significant revision. When shown to a smaller than usual number of significant figures, it is not known accurately enough to justify more.
Decay mode column

α	α decay
β^{−}	β^{−} decay
β^{−}β^{−}	double β^{−} decay
ε	electron capture
β^{+}	β^{+} decay
β^{+}β^{+}	double β^{+} decay
SF	spontaneous fission
IT	isomeric transition

Decay modes in parentheses are given for observationally stable nuclides (these and these); they are then those allowed to occur by energy (in the next column), but spontaneous fission (and cluster decay, which is never shown in the tables) are neglected as they should never be observed for these nuclides. Those with multiple significant decay modes have the probability of each decay mode in percent given, in small figures, in parentheses; those less than 0.05% are rounded to zero and omitted, and 100 (>99.5% of observed decays) is not used but replaced by bold unless the only other decays are SF or double beta, assumed to be minority decays if not listed first. If more than one of α, β^{−}, β^{+}/ε, IT is given without numbers or bold, one can assume no experimental data is available. Note that, by widely used convention, β^{+} (technically positron emission) includes ε, and conversely, if positron emission is energetically possible; the two are never separated on this page.
Decay energy column
Multiple values for decay energy for each given decay mode (skipping SF), in respective order. Decay energies are the whole energy difference to the ground state of the product, and so include energy lost to neutrinos. Further decays in a decay chain are not included.
Notes column

CG
Cosmogenic nuclide.
DP
Naturally occurring decay product (of thorium-232, uranium-238, or uranium-235), including products of neutron reactions other than fission.
ESS
Present in the early Solar System (first few million years), but extinct now as a primordial nuclide. Inherently overlaps with cosmogenic nuclides.
FP
Nuclear fission product , (Note: Two isotopes marked as such, ^{134}Cs and ^{154}Eu, are not directly produced by fission but arise in nuclear reactors by neutron capture on isotopes that are. They are included as they are mentioned elsewhere on Wikipedia as being produced by fission.) may occur naturally from spontaneous fission.
IM
Industry or medically used radionuclide.

Of the 701 non-primordial nuclides in the tables below, 101 have the label FP (99 true fission products), 65 IM, 32 DP, 24 CG, 13 ESS, and 7 both CG and ESS.

== Full list ==
The tables are based now on the standard reference NUBASE2020 and its companion, based on the same data, AME2020. All observational data not otherwise cited should be found in those sources, or calculated from them, and only observed data, not theoretical extrapolations, should be present in these tables.

=== Theoretically stable nuclides ===
These are the theoretically stable nuclides, ordered by "energy".

No.	Nuclide	A	Z	N	Energy (MeV)
1	^{56}Fe	56	26	30	9.153589
2	^{62}Ni	62	28	34	9.147873
3	^{60}Ni	60	28	32	9.145871
4	^{58}Fe	58	26	32	9.142961
5	^{52}Cr	52	24	28	9.137078
6	^{57}Fe	57	26	31	9.127143
7	^{59}Co	59	27	32	9.126060
8	^{54}Cr	54	24	30	9.125677
9	^{61}Ni	61	28	33	9.124138
10	^{55}Mn	55	25	30	9.120637
11	^{64}Ni	64	28	36	9.119740
12	^{66}Zn	66	30	36	9.11525
13	^{53}Cr	53	24	29	9.114481
14	^{63}Cu	63	29	34	9.112269
15	^{65}Cu	65	29	36	9.106144
16	^{68}Zn	68	30	38	9.10084
17	^{50}Ti	50	22	28	9.099956
18	^{51}V	51	23	28	9.094908
19	^{67}Zn	67	30	37	9.08446
20	^{48}Ti	48	22	26	9.081588
21	^{72}Ge	72	32	40	9.079456
22	^{70}Ge	70	32	38	9.07935
23	^{69}Ga	69	31	38	9.07607
24	^{88}Sr	88	38	50	9.070428
25	^{74}Ge	74	32	42	9.063513
26	^{49}Ti	49	22	27	9.062420
27	^{76}Se	76	34	42	9.061475
28	^{71}Ga	71	31	40	9.05919
29	^{78}Se	78	34	44	9.058830
30	^{90}Zr	90	40	50	9.057680
31	^{89}Y	89	39	50	9.056837
32	^{86}Sr	86	38	48	9.054145
33	^{82}Kr	82	36	46	9.054145
34	^{84}Kr	84	36	48	9.052739
35	^{73}Ge	73	32	41	9.047997
36	^{87}Sr	87	38	49	9.046951
37	^{75}As	75	33	42	9.04511
38	^{80}Kr	80	36	44	9.044987
39	^{77}Se	77	34	43	9.040143
40	^{85}Rb	85	37	48	9.037993
41	^{91}Zr	91	40	51	9.037204
42	^{83}Kr	83	36	47	9.035061
43	^{79}Br	79	35	44	9.03421
44	^{81}Br	81	35	46	9.03400
45	^{92}Zr	92	40	52	9.032829
46	^{46}Ti	46	22	24	9.030628
47	^{47}Ti	47	22	25	9.027437
48	^{44}Ca	44	20	24	9.013789
49	^{94}Mo	94	42	52	9.011893
50	^{93}Nb	93	41	52	9.00909
51	^{96}Mo	96	42	54	8.996265
52	^{95}Mo	95	42	53	8.994601
53	^{42}Ca	42	20	22	8.989111
54	^{38}Ar	38	18	20	8.984866
55	^{45}Sc	45	21	24	8.98404
56	^{97}Mo	97	42	55	8.973841
57	^{98}Ru	98	44	54	8.97157
58	^{43}Ca	43	20	23	8.964548
59	^{100}Ru	100	44	56	8.963592
60	^{99}Ru	99	44	55	8.956423
61	^{34}S	34	16	18	8.951662
62	^{40}Ar	40	18	22	8.947316
63	^{102}Ru	102	44	58	8.944910
64	^{101}Ru	101	44	57	8.942190
65	^{41}K	41	19	22	8.938624
66	^{39}K	39	19	20	8.938169
67	^{104}Pd	104	46	58	8.93089
68	^{37}Cl	37	17	20	8.929738
69	^{103}Rh	103	45	58	8.92599
70	^{36}S	36	16	20	8.923100
71	^{106}Pd	106	46	60	8.91950
72	^{105}Pd	105	46	59	8.91339
73	^{35}Cl	35	17	18	8.900276
74	^{108}Pd	108	46	62	8.90025
75	^{107}Ag	107	47	60	8.89755
76	^{110}Cd	110	48	62	8.892664
77	^{30}Si	30	14	16	8.885750
78	^{109}Ag	109	47	62	8.88526
79	^{32}S	32	16	16	8.884304
80	^{33}S	33	16	17	8.876950
81	^{31}P	31	15	16	8.859723
82	^{28}Si	28	14	14	8.838918
83	^{29}Si	29	14	15	8.826321
84	^{112}Cd	112	48	64	8.880022
85	^{111}Cd	111	48	63	8.875392
86	^{114}Sn	114	50	64	8.865702
87	^{113}In	113	49	64	8.862178
88	^{116}Sn	116	50	66	8.860335
89	^{115}Sn	115	50	65	8.854221
90	^{118}Sn	118	50	68	8.848037
91	^{117}Sn	117	50	67	8.843948
92	^{120}Sn	120	50	70	8.830466
93	^{119}Sn	119	50	69	8.828167
94	^{121}Sb	121	51	70	8.81181
95	^{122}Te	122	52	70	8.81159
96	^{124}Te	124	52	72	8.80135
97	^{123}Sb	123	51	72	8.79671
98	^{126}Te	126	52	74	8.78611
99	^{125}Te	125	52	73	8.78349
100	^{128}Xe	128	54	74	8.773354
101	^{127}I	127	53	74	8.77197
102	^{130}Xe	130	54	76	8.762706
103	^{129}Xe	129	54	75	8.758885
104	^{132}Xe	132	54	78	8.747674
105	^{131}Xe	131	54	77	8.746231
106	^{134}Ba	134	56	78	8.735124
107	^{133}Cs	133	55	78	8.733506
108	^{136}Ba	136	56	80	8.724900
109	^{135}Ba	135	56	79	8.722064
110	^{137}Ba	137	56	81	8.711620
111	^{138}Ba	138	56	82	8.710896
112	^{27}Al	27	13	14	8.708239
113	^{140}Ce	140	58	82	8.700420
114	^{139}La	139	57	82	8.698817
115	^{26}Mg	26	12	14	8.694954
116	^{141}Pr	141	59	82	8.68135
117	^{142}Nd	142	60	82	8.676600
118	^{24}Mg	24	12	12	8.651884
119	^{25}Mg	25	12	13	8.599029
120	^{156}Gd	156	64	92	8.536288
121	^{157}Gd	157	64	93	8.522426
122	^{158}Gd	158	64	94	8.518723
123	^{159}Tb	159	65	94	8.508630
124	^{23}Na	23	11	12	8.485660
125	^{163}Dy	163	66	97	8.478563
126	^{164}Dy	164	66	98	8.473560
127	^{22}Ne	22	10	12	8.436078
128	^{20}Ne	20	10	10	8.423415
129	^{16}O	16	8	8	8.367381
130	^{21}Ne	21	10	11	8.344260
131	^{19}F	19	9	10	8.149605
132	^{17}O	17	8	9	8.118892
133	^{18}O	18	8	10	8.114808
134	^{12}C	12	6	6	8.071318
135	^{15}N	15	7	8	8.064556
136	^{14}N	14	7	7	7.866788
137	^{13}C	13	6	7	7.830933
138	^{4}He	4	2	2	7.465089
139	^{11}B	11	5	6	7.283345
140	^{10}B	10	5	5	6.866257
141	^{9}Be	9	4	5	6.810379
142	^{7}Li	7	3	4	5.941732
143	^{6}Li	6	3	3	5.723505
144	^{3}He	3	2	1	3.094245
145	^{2}H	2	1	1	1.503457
146	^{1}H	1	1	0	0.782347

=== Observationally stable nuclides having theoretical decay modes other than spontaneous fission (no lower bounds) ===
Ordered by "energy".

No.	Nuclide	A	Z	N	Energy	Decay mode	Decay energy (MeV)
147	^{80}Se	80	34	46	9.04331	(β^{−}β^{−})	0.134
148	^{86}Kr	86	36	50	9.039524	(β^{−}β^{−})	1.257
149	^{84}Sr	84	38	46	9.03143	(β^{+}β^{+})	1.790
150	^{102}Pd	102	46	56	8.933112	(β^{+}β^{+})	1.203
151	^{36}Ar	36	18	18	8.911083	(β^{+}β^{+})	0.433
152	^{122}Sn	122	50	72	8.80853	(β^{−}β^{−})	0.373
153	^{150}Sm	150	62	88	8.584993	(α)	1.450
154	^{152}Sm	152	62	90	8.563180	(α)	0.220
155	^{154}Gd	154	64	90	8.549931	(α)	0.920
156	^{155}Gd	155	64	91	8.536288	(α)	0.081
157	^{164}Er	164	68	96	8.473407	(β^{+}β^{+}, α)	0.025, 1.305
158	^{165}Ho	165	67	98	8.464639	(α)	0.139
159	^{166}Er	166	68	98	8.462427	(α)	0.832
160	^{167}Er	167	68	99	8.450296	(α)	0.667
161	^{168}Er	168	68	100	8.446254	(α)	0.553
162	^{169}Tm	169	69	100	8.433890	(α)	1.198
163	^{170}Yb	170	70	100	8.428753	(α)	1.735
164	^{171}Yb	171	70	101	8.418142	(α)	1.558
165	^{172}Yb	172	70	102	8.415827	(α)	1.309
166	^{173}Yb	173	70	103	8.403984	(α)	0.945
167	^{174}Yb	174	70	104	8.398585	(α)	0.738
168	^{175}Lu	175	71	104	8.386551	(α)	1.620
169	^{181}Ta	181	73	108	8.338937	(α)	1.520
170	^{185}Re	185	75	110	8.308178	(α)	2.195
171	^{191}Ir	191	77	114	8.263511	(α)	2.083
172	^{194}Pt	194	78	116	8.250494	(α)	1.523
173	^{193}Ir	193	77	116	8.250263	(α)	1.018
174	^{195}Pt	195	78	117	8.239492	(α)	1.176
175	^{196}Pt	196	78	118	8.237872	(α)	0.813
176	^{197}Au	197	79	118	8.229388	(α)	0.972
177	^{198}Hg	198	80	118	8.227653	(α)	1.381
178	^{199}Hg	199	80	119	8.219791	(α)	0.823
179	^{200}Hg	200	80	120	8.218835	(α)	0.716
180	^{201}Hg	201	80	121	8.208942	(α)	0.332
181	^{202}Hg	202	80	122	8.206691	(α)	0.134
182	^{203}Tl	203	81	122	8.198221	(α)	0.908
183	^{204}Hg	204	80	124	8.192348	(β^{−}β^{−})	0.420
184	^{205}Tl	205	81	124	8.187517	(α)	0.155

=== Observationally stable nuclides having theoretical decay modes other than spontaneous fission, for which those decays have experimental lower bounds ===
Ordered by the given lower bound on half-life. These should not be considered authoritative without consulting the original source (footnote, or if none, that given in) as exactly what was measured and how are not reflected here, and some of the values may be misinterpretations. Further, in all cases, this is not an indicator of the probable half-life, which may be much longer (especially for alpha decay), but only the experiment's ability to measure it.

No.	Nuclide	A	Z	N	Energy	Half-life (seconds)	Half-life (years) (Note: Note that NUBASE2020 uses the tropical year to convert between years and other units of time, not the Gregorian year. The relationship between years and other time units in NUBASE2020 is as follows: 1 y = 365.2422 d = 31 556 926 s)	Decay mode	Decay energy (MeV)
185	^{134}Xe	134	54	80	8.728974	> 8.8×10^{29}	> 2.8×10^{22}	(β^{−}β^{−})	0.824
186	^{40}Ca	40	20	20	8.942478	> 3.1×10^{29}	> 9.9×10^{21}	(β^{+}β^{+})	0.193
187	^{184}W	184	74	110	8.319718	> 2.8×10^{29}	> 8.9×10^{21}	(α)	1.649
188	^{182}W	182	74	108	8.336407	> 2.4×10^{29}	> 7.7×10^{21}	(α)	1.764
189	^{208}Pb	208	82	126	8.175878	> 8.2×10^{28}	> 2.6×10^{21}	(α)	0.517
190	^{206}Pb	206	82	124	8.186782	> 7.9×10^{28}	> 2.5×10^{21}	(α)	1.135
191	^{126}Xe	126	54	72	8.77883	> 6.0×10^{28}	> 1.9×10^{21}	(β^{+}β^{+})	0.918
192	^{207}Pb	207	82	125	8.179782	> 6.0×10^{28}	> 1.9×10^{21}	(α)	0.392
193	^{120}Te	120	52	68	8.81599	> 5.0×10^{28}	> 1.6×10^{21}	(β^{+}β^{+})	1.736
194	^{106}Cd	106	48	58	8.89332	> 3.5×10^{28}	> 1.1×10^{21}	(β^{+}β^{+})	2.775
195	^{58}Ni	58	28	30	9.109747	> 2.2×10^{28}	> 7.0×10^{20}	(β^{+}β^{+})	1.926
196	^{183}W	183	74	109	8.324683	> 2.1×10^{28}	> 6.7×10^{20}	(α)	1.672
197	^{104}Ru	104	44	60	8.91839	> 2.0×10^{28}	> 6.5×10^{20}	(β^{−}β^{−})	1.299
198	^{54}Fe	54	26	28	9.113070	> 1.4×10^{28}	> 4.4×10^{20}	(β^{+}β^{+})	0.681
199	^{132}Ba	132	56	76	8.741279	> 9.5×10^{27}	> 3.0×10^{20}	(β^{+}β^{+})	0.844
200	^{110}Pd	110	46	64	8.874326	> 9.1×10^{27}	> 2.9×10^{20}	(β^{−}β^{−})	2.017
201	^{92}Mo	92	42	50	9.014890	> 6.0×10^{27}	> 1.9×10^{20}	(β^{+}β^{+})	1.650
202	^{204}Pb	204	82	122	8.194405	> 4.4×10^{27}	> 1.4×10^{20}	(α)	1.969
203	^{112}Sn	112	50	62	8.862881	> 3.1×10^{27}	> 9.7×10^{19}	(β^{+}β^{+})	1.920
204	^{96}Ru	96	44	52	8.967989	> 2.5×10^{27}	> 8.0×10^{19}	(β^{+}β^{+})	2.715
205	^{192}Os	192	76	116	8.25821	> 1.7×10^{27}	> 5.3×10^{19}	(β^{−}β^{−}, α)	0.406, 0.361
206	^{198}Pt	198	78	120	8.22235	> 1.0×10^{27}	> 3.2×10^{19}	(β^{−}β^{−}, α)	1.050, 0.106
207	^{160}Gd	160	64	96	8.495956	> 9.8×10^{26}	> 3.1×10^{19}	(β^{−}β^{−})	1.730
208	^{186}W	186	74	112	8.299859	> 7.3×10^{26}	> 2.3×10^{19}	(β^{−}β^{−}, α)	0.491, 1.116
209	^{144}Sm	144	62	82	8.64052	> 4.4×10^{26}	> 1.4×10^{19}	(β^{+}β^{+})	1.782
210	^{190}Os	190	76	114	8.275043	> 3.8×10^{26}	> 1.2×10^{19}	(α)	1.376
211	^{64}Zn	64	30	34	9.102631	> 3.5×10^{26}	> 1.1×10^{19}	(β^{+}β^{+})	1.095
212	^{74}Se	74	34	40	9.047172	> 2.2×10^{26}	> 7.0×10^{18}	(β^{+}β^{+})	1.209
213	^{70}Zn	70	30	40	9.06510	> 1.2×10^{26}	> 3.8×10^{18}	(β^{−}β^{−})	0.997
214	^{188}Os	188	76	112	8.290134	> 1.0×10^{26}	> 3.3×10^{18}	(α)	2.143
215	^{143}Nd	143	60	83	8.658747	> 9.8×10^{25}	> 3.1×10^{18}	(α)	0.530
216	^{148}Nd	148	60	88	8.59435	> 9.5×10^{25}	> 3.0×10^{18}	(β^{−}β^{−}, α)	1.928, 0.599
217	^{142}Ce	142	58	84	8.66662	> 9.1×10^{25}	> 2.9×10^{18}	(β^{−}β^{−}, α)	1.417, 1.304
218	^{179}Hf	179	72	107	8.353234	> 8.5×10^{25}	> 2.7×10^{18}	(α)	1.808
219	^{196}Hg	196	80	116	8.23370	> 7.9×10^{25}	> 2.5×10^{18}	(β^{+}β^{+}, α)	0.819, 2.038
220	^{154}Sm	154	62	92	8.541809	> 7.3×10^{25}	> 2.3×10^{18}	(β^{−}β^{−})	1.251
221	^{146}Nd	146	60	86	8.625605	> 5.0×10^{25}	> 1.6×10^{18}	(β^{−}β^{−}, α)	0.070, 1.182
222	^{50}Cr	50	24	26	9.076545	> 4.1×10^{25}	> 1.3×10^{18}	(β^{+}β^{+})	1.171
223	^{178}Hf	178	72	106	8.365899	> 4.1×10^{25}	> 1.3×10^{18}	(α)	2.084
224	^{177}Hf	177	72	105	8.370079	> 3.5×10^{25}	> 1.1×10^{18}	(α)	2.246
225	^{156}Dy	156	66	90	8.523430	> 3.2×10^{25}	> 1.0×10^{18} (Note: Nubase value, for alpha decay only. Double electron capture limited only to 6.1×10^{14} (ground state) by)	(β^{+}β^{+}, α)	2.006, 1.753
226	^{153}Eu	153	63	90	8.550844	> 1.8×10^{25}	> 5.5×10^{17}	(α)	0.272
227	^{180}Hf	180	72	108	8.347871	> 1.5×10^{25}	> 4.6×10^{17}	(α)	1.287
228	^{108}Cd	108	48	60	8.89773	> 1.3×10^{25}	> 4.1×10^{17}	(β^{+}β^{+})	0.272
229	^{170}Er	170	68	102	8.424892	> 1.3×10^{25}	> 4.1×10^{17}	(β^{−}β^{−}, α)	0.656, 0.052
230	^{138}Ce	138	58	80	8.705854	> 1.3×10^{25}	> 4.0×10^{17}	(β^{+}β^{+})	0.696
231	^{180m}Ta	180	73	107	8.342753	> 9.1×10^{24}	> 2.9×10^{17}	(β^{−}, ε, IT, α)	0.778, 0.921, 0.075, 2.099
232	^{176}Hf	176	72	104	8.381411	> 8.5×10^{24}	> 2.7×10^{17}	(α)	2.254
233	^{46}Ca	46	20	26	9.00914	> 5.7×10^{24}	> 1.8×10^{17}	(β^{−}β^{−})	0.987
234	^{176}Yb	176	70	106	8.375246	> 5.0×10^{24}	> 1.6×10^{17}	(β^{−}β^{−}, α)	1.085, 0.567
235	^{94}Zr	94	40	54	8.999715	> 3.5×10^{24}	> 1.1×10^{17}	(β^{−}β^{−})	1.145
236	^{124}Sn	124	50	74	8.78286	> 3.2×10^{24}	> 1.0×10^{17}	(β^{−}β^{−})	2.293
237	^{162}Dy	162	66	96	8.492190	> 3.2×10^{24}	> 1.0×10^{17}	(α)	0.084
238	^{136}Ce	136	58	78	8.707410	> 3.0×10^{24}	> 9.6×10^{16}	(β^{+}β^{+})	2.379
239	^{114}Cd	114	48	66	8.860923	> 2.9×10^{24}	> 9.2×10^{16}	(β^{−}β^{−})	0.545
240	^{123}Te	123	52	71	8.79629	> 2.9×10^{24}	> 9.2×10^{16}	(ε)	0.052
241	^{145}Nd	145	60	85	8.632918	> 1.9×10^{24}	> 6.0×10^{16}	(α)	1.574
242	^{192}Pt	192	78	114	8.26032	> 1.9×10^{24}	> 6.0×10^{16}	(α)	2.424
243	^{161}Dy	161	66	95	8.494023	> 1.1×10^{24}	> 3.5×10^{16}	(α)	0.343
244	^{160}Dy	160	66	94	8.506771	> 2.7×10^{23}	> 8.5×10^{15}	(α)	0.438
245	^{189}Os	189	76	113	8.277597	> 1.1×10^{23}	> 3.5×10^{15}	(α)	1.976
246	^{187}Os	187	76	111	8.291741	> 1.0×10^{23}	> 3.2×10^{15}	(α)	2.722
247	^{149}Sm	149	62	87	8.589009	> 6.3×10^{22}	> 2.0×10^{15}	(α)	1.871
248	^{158}Dy	158	66	92	8.51693	> 3.2×10^{22}	> 1.0×10^{15}	(β^{+}β^{+}, α)	0.283, 0.874
249	^{162}Er	162	68	94	8.480788	> 4.4×10^{21}	> 1.4×10^{14}	(β^{+}β^{+}, α)	1.847, 1.648
250	^{168}Yb	168	70	98	8.437865	> 4.1×10^{21}	> 1.3×10^{14}	(β^{+}β^{+}, α)	1.409, 1.938
251	^{98}Mo	98	42	56	8.970461	> 3.2×10^{21}	> 1.0×10^{14}	(β^{−}β^{−})	0.109

=== Primordial radioactive nuclides (half-life > 10^{8} years) ===
Ordered by half-life.

No.	Nuclide	A	Z	N	Energy	Half-life (seconds)	Half-life (years)	Decay mode	Decay energy (MeV)
252	^{128}Te	128	52	76	8.766582	7.10×10^{31}	2.25×10^{24}	β^{−}β^{−}	0.867
253	^{124}Xe	124	54	70	8.77829	3.47×10^{29}	1.1×10^{22}	εε	2.857
254	^{78}Kr	78	36	42	9.022322	2.90×10^{29}	9.2×10^{21}	εε	2.848
255	^{136}Xe	136	54	82	8.692917	6.88×10^{28}	2.18×10^{21}	β^{−}β^{−}	2.458
256	^{76}Ge	76	32	44	9.034646	6.375×10^{28}	2.02×10^{21}	β^{−}β^{−}	2.039
257	^{130}Ba	130	56	74	8.742524	3.2×10^{28}	1×10^{21} (Note: The two experimental values are discordant, with a total range of (0.5–2.7)×10^{21} years; the value in the table is a rough average.)	εε	2.624
258	^{130}Te	130	52	78	8.743264	2.496×10^{28}	7.9×10^{20}	β^{−}β^{−}	2.528
259	^{82}Se	82	34	48	9.017585	2.764×10^{27}	8.76×10^{19}	β^{−}β^{−}	2.998
260	^{48}Ca	48	20	28	8.992670	1.767×10^{27}	5.6×10^{19}	β^{−}β^{−}	4.268
261	^{116}Cd	116	48	68	8.836081	8.489×10^{26}	2.69×10^{19}	β^{−}β^{−}	2.813
262	^{96}Zr	96	40	56	8.961306	6.627×10^{26}	2.1×10^{19}	β^{−}β^{−} (91), β^{−} (9)	3.356, 0.164
263	^{209}Bi	209	83	126	8.158680	6.343×10^{26}	2.01×10^{19}	α	3.137
264	^{150}Nd	150	60	90	8.562518	2.935×10^{26}	9.3×10^{18}	β^{−}β^{−}	3.371
265	^{100}Mo	100	42	58	8.933248	2.231×10^{26}	7.07×10^{18}	β^{−}β^{−}	3.034
266	^{151}Eu	151	63	88	8.565709	1.452×10^{26}	4.6×10^{18}	α	1.964
267	^{180}W	180	74	106	8.347075	5.018×10^{25}	1.59×10^{18}	α	2.515
268	^{50}V	50	23	27	9.055783	8.552×10^{24}	2.71×10^{17}	β^{+} (Note: Also theoretically capable of β^{−} decay)	2.209
269	^{174}Hf	174	72	102	8.39226	1.199×10^{24}	3.8×10^{16}	α	2.494
270	^{113}Cd	113	48	65	8.859312	2.537×10^{23}	8.04×10^{15}	β^{−}	0.324
271	^{148}Sm	148	62	86	8.607373	1.988×10^{23}	6.3×10^{15}	α	1.987
272	^{144}Nd	144	60	84	8.651026	7.227×10^{22}	2.29×10^{15}	α	1.901
273	^{186}Os	186	76	110	8.302501	6.3×10^{22}	2.0×10^{15}	α	2.821
274	^{115}In	115	49	66	8.849895	1.392×10^{22}	4.41×10^{14}	β^{−}	0.497
275	^{152}Gd	152	64	88	8.562813	3.408×10^{21}	1.08×10^{14}	α	2.204
276	^{184}Os	184	76	108	8.311821	3.53×10^{20}	1.12×10^{13}	α	2.959
277	^{190}Pt	190	78	112	8.267668	1.524×10^{19}	4.83×10^{11}	α	3.269
278	^{147}Sm	147	62	85	8.610543	3.364×10^{18}	1.066×10^{11}	α	2.311
279	^{138}La	138	57	81	8.698227	3.250×10^{18}	1.03×10^{11}	β^{+} (65), β^{−} (35)	1.748, 1.053
280	^{87}Rb	87	37	50	9.043707	1.568×10^{18}	4.97×10^{10}	β^{−}	0.282
281	^{187}Re	187	75	112	8.291727	1.313×10^{18}	4.16×10^{10}	β^{−}	0.0026
282	^{176}Lu	176	71	105	8.374627	1.168×10^{18}	3.70×10^{10}	β^{−} (Note: Theoretically capable of electron capture)	1.194
283	^{232}Th	232	90	142	7.918531	4.418×10^{17}	1.40×10^{10}	α, SF	4.083
284	^{238}U	238	92	146	7.872546	1.408×10^{17}	4.463×10^{9}	α, SF, β^{−}β^{−}	4.270, 1.145
285	^{40}K	40	19	21	8.909706	3.938×10^{16}	1.248×10^{9}	β^{−} (89), β^{+} (11)	1.311, 1.504
286	^{235}U	235	92	143	7.897196	2.222×10^{16}	7.04×10^{8}	α, SF	4.679

=== Radionuclides with half-lives of 10^{4} years to 10^{8} years ===
Ordered by half-life. Some of these are known to have been present in the early Solar System (marked "ESS", meaning the first few million years of the Solar System's history) from an excess of their decay products.

No.	Nuclide	Z	N	Energy	Half-life (seconds)	Half-life (years)	Decay mode	Notes
287	^{146}Sm	62	84	8.62609	2.903×10^{15}	9.20×10^{7}	α	ESS
288	^{244}Pu	94	150	7.826212	2.566×10^{15}	8.13×10^{7}	α, SF (0.12)	interstellar, ESS
289	^{92}Nb	41	51	9.01103	1.095×10^{15}	3.47×10^{7}	β^{+}	CG, ESS
290	^{236}U	92	144	7.891468	7.391×10^{14}	2.342×10^{7}	α, SF	DP
291	^{205}Pb	82	123	8.187270	5.365×10^{14}	1.70×10^{7}	β^{+}	ESS
292	^{129}I	53	76	8.75742	5.093×10^{14}	1.614×10^{7}	β^{−}	CG, FP, ESS
293	^{247}Cm	96	151	7.80600	4.923×10^{14}	1.56×10^{7}	α	ESS
294	^{182}Hf	72	110	8.32434	2.809×10^{14}	8.90×10^{6}	β^{−}	ESS
295	^{107}Pd	46	61	8.89723	2.051×10^{14}	6.5×10^{6}	β^{−}	FP, ESS
296	^{97}Tc	43	54	8.97053	1.329×10^{14}	4.21×10^{6}	β^{+}	
297	^{98}Tc	43	55	8.95328	1.325×10^{14}	4.2×10^{6}	β^{−}	
298	^{53}Mn	25	28	9.103211	1.168×10^{14}	3.7×10^{6}	β^{+}	CG, ESS
299	^{210m}Bi	83	127	8.140464	9.594×10^{13}	3.04×10^{6}	α	
300	^{60}Fe	26	34	9.09487	8.268×10^{13}	2.62×10^{6}	β^{−}	CG, interstellar, ESS
301	^{237}Np	93	144	7.881986	6.766×10^{13}	2.144×10^{6}	α, SF	DP
302	^{150}Gd	64	86	8.57641	5.649×10^{13}	1.79×10^{6}	α	
303	^{93}Zr	40	53	9.008114	5.081×10^{13}	1.61×10^{6}	β^{−}	FP
304	^{154}Dy	66	88	8.52842	4.418×10^{13}	1.40×10^{6}	α	
305	^{10}Be	4	6	6.810569	4.377×10^{13}	1.387×10^{6}	β^{−}	CG, ESS
306	^{135}Cs	55	80	8.720074	4.197×10^{13}	1.33×10^{6}	β^{−}	FP
307	^{26}Al	13	13	8.540939	2.263×10^{13}	7.17×10^{5}	β^{+}	CG, ESS
308	^{242}Pu	94	148	7.845215	1.183×10^{13}	3.75×10^{5}	α, SF	
309	^{208}Bi	83	125	8.16204	1.161×10^{13}	3.68×10^{5}	β^{+}	
310	^{248}Cm	96	152	7.799573	1.098×10^{13}	3.48×10^{5}	α (92), SF (8.4)	
311	^{79}Se	34	45	9.032299	1.032×10^{13}	3.3×10^{5}	β^{−}	FP
312	^{36}Cl	17	19	8.891374	9.499×10^{12}	3.01×10^{5}	β^{−} (98), β^{+} (1.9)	CG, IM
313	^{234}U	92	142	7.908305	7.747×10^{12}	2.455×10^{5}	α, SF	DP
314	^{126}Sn	50	76	8.75398	7.258×10^{12}	2.3×10^{5}	β^{−}	FP
315	^{81}Kr	36	45	9.03053	7.227×10^{12}	2.29×10^{5}	β^{+}	CG
316	^{99}Tc	43	56	8.953418	6.662×10^{12}	2.111×10^{5}	β^{−}	FP
317	^{186m}Re	75	111	8.295937	6.312×10^{12}	2×10^{5}	IT	
318	^{233}U	92	141	7.912867	5.024×10^{12}	1.592×10^{5}	α, SF	DP
319	^{236}Np	93	143	7.8875	4.828×10^{12}	1.53×10^{5}	β^{+} (86), β^{−} (14), α (0.16)	
320	^{41}Ca	20	21	8.928340	3.137×10^{12}	9.9×10^{4}	β^{+}	CG, ESS
321	^{59}Ni	28	31	9.107874	2.556×10^{12}	8.1×10^{4}	β^{+}	
322	^{230}Th	90	140	7.937133	2.379×10^{12}	7.54×10^{4}	α, SF	DP
323	^{137}La	57	80	8.70738	1.893×10^{12}	6×10^{4}	β^{+}	
324	^{202}Pb	82	120	8.19974	1.657×10^{12}	5.25×10^{4}	β^{+}	
325	^{231}Pa	91	140	7.926624	1.030×10^{12}	3.27×10^{4}	α, SF	DP
326	^{239}Pu	94	145	7.868020	7.609×10^{11}	2.411×10^{4}	α, SF	DP, IM
327	^{94}Nb	41	53	8.99014	6.438×10^{11}	2.04×10^{4}	β^{−}	CG

=== Radionuclides with half-lives of 10 years to 10^{4} years ===
Ordered by half-life.

No.	Nuclide	Z	N	Energy	Half-life (seconds)	Half-life (years)	Decay mode	Notes
328	^{250}Cm	96	154	7.77936	2.62×10^{11}	8300 (Note: Only SF has been observed with a half-life 11,300 years; the value given theoretically estimates alpha- and beta-decay branches, which is quite uncertain.)	SF, α, β^{−}	
329	^{245}Cm	96	149	7.822320	2.60×10^{11}	8250	α, SF	
330	^{229}Th	90	139	7.94212	2.498×10^{11}	7920	α	DP
331	^{243}Am	95	148	7.836030	2.319×10^{11}	7350	α, SF	
332	^{240}Pu	94	146	7.862463	2.070×10^{11}	6561	α, SF	
333	^{14}C	6	8	7.855611	1.799×10^{11}	5700	β^{−}	CG, IM
334	^{93}Mo	42	51	9.004728	1.53×10^{11}	4839	β^{+}	
335	^{246}Cm	96	150	7.816778	1.485×10^{11}	4700	α, SF	
336	^{163}Ho	67	96	8.478545	1.442×10^{11}	4570	β^{+}	
337	^{226}Ra	88	138	7.966594	5.049×10^{10}	1600	α	DP
338	^{247}Bk	97	150	7.80618	4.35×10^{10}	1380	α, SF	
339	^{166m}Ho	67	99	8.451224	3.574×10^{10}	1133	β^{−}	
340	^{251}Cf	98	153	7.77596	2.83×10^{10}	900	α, SF	
341	^{91}Nb	41	50	9.02338	2.15×10^{10}	680	β^{+}	
342	^{194}Hg	80	114	8.23722	1.41×10^{10}	450	β^{+}	
343	^{108m}Ag	47	61	8.88148	1.385×10^{10}	439	β^{+} (91), IT (8.7)	
344	^{241}Am	95	146	7.851674	1.364×10^{10}	432.6	α, SF	IM
345	^{249}Cf	98	151	7.791307	1.108×10^{10}	351	α, SF	
346	^{39}Ar	18	21	8.9237	8.457×10^{9}	268 (Note: Nubase value. However, a recent direct study: P. Adhikari; et al. (2025). "Direct Measurement of the Half-Life of ^{39}Ar from 3.4 Years of Data with the DEAP-3600 Detector". The European Physical Journal C. 85 (7): 728. arXiv:2501.13196. doi:10.1140/epjc/s10052-025-14289-5. found 302 years, a statistically significant discrepancy to be explained.)	β^{−}	CG
347	^{192m2}Ir	77	115	8.251878	7.605×10^{9}	241	IT	
348	^{158}Tb	65	93	8.511007	5.68×10^{9}	180	β^{+} (83), β^{−} (17)	
349	^{32}Si	14	18	8.823746	4.95×10^{9}	157	β^{−}	CG
350	^{242m}Am	95	147	7.841911	4.450×10^{9}	141	IT, α (0.46), SF	
351	^{209}Po	84	125	8.149624	3.913×10^{9}	124	α, β^{+} (0.45)	
352	^{63}Ni	28	35	9.111205	3.194×10^{9}	101	β^{−}	IM
353	^{151}Sm	62	89	8.565202	2.985×10^{9}	94.6	β^{−}	FP
354	^{238}Pu	94	144	7.877355	2.768×10^{9}	87.7	α, SF	DP, IM
355	^{148}Gd	64	84	8.58665	2.74×10^{9}	86.9	α	
356	^{157}Tb	65	92	8.522043	2.24×10^{9}	71	β^{+}	
357	^{232}U	92	140	7.922140	2.174×10^{9}	68.9	α, SF	
358	^{44}Ti	22	22	8.92470	1.865×10^{9}	59.1	β^{+}	
359	^{193}Pt	78	115	8.249969	1.58×10^{9}	50	β^{+}	
360	^{121m}Sn	50	71	8.808428	1.385×10^{9}	43.9	IT (78), β^{−} (22)	FP
361	^{150}Eu	63	87	8.56993	1.164×10^{9}	36.9	β^{+}	
362	^{42}Ar	18	24	8.8909	1.038×10^{9}	32.9	β^{−}	
363	^{207}Bi	83	124	8.16820	9.852×10^{8}	31.22	β^{+}	
364	^{178m2}Hf	72	106	8.352157	9.783×10^{8}	31	IT	
365	^{137}Cs	55	82	8.703039	9.480×10^{8}	30.04	β^{−}	FP, IM
366	^{243}Cm	96	147	7.836002	9.183×10^{8}	29.1	α, β^{+} (0.3), SF	
367	^{90}Sr	38	52	9.02633	9.123×10^{8}	28.91	β^{−}	FP, IM
368	^{210}Pb	82	128	8.141453	7.006×10^{8}	22.2	β^{−}, α	DP, IM
369	^{227}Ac	89	138	7.957444	6.871×10^{8}	21.772	β^{−} (99), α (1.4)	DP
370	^{244}Cm	96	148	7.831762	5.715×10^{8}	18.11	α, SF	
371	^{145}Pm	61	84	8.63178	5.586×10^{8}	17.7	β^{+}, α	
372	^{93m}Nb	41	52	9.00876	5.087×10^{8}	16.1	IT	FP
373	^{241}Pu	94	147	7.851587	4.522×10^{8}	14.33	β^{−}, α, SF	
374	^{113m}Cd	48	65	8.845980	4.383×10^{8}	13.9	β^{−}, IT (0.10)	FP
375	^{152}Eu	63	89	8.550848	4.266×10^{8}	13.517	β^{+} (72), β^{−} (28)	
376	^{250}Cf	98	152	7.786637	4.128×10^{8}	13.08	α, SF (0.08)	
377	^{3}H	1	2	3.088048	3.888×10^{8}	12.32	β^{−}	CG, IM
378	^{85}Kr	36	49	9.02991	3.385×10^{8}	10.728	β^{−}	FP, IM
379	^{133}Ba	56	77	8.729615	3.326×10^{8}	10.538	β^{+}	

=== Radionuclide with unknown half-life ===
No decay has been observed, but not primordial so does not qualify as "observationally stable".

No.	Nuclide	Z	N	Energy (MeV)	Half-life (seconds)	Half-life (years)	Decay modes	Notes
380	^{248}Bk	97	151	7.7966	> 2.84×10^{8}	> 9 y (Note: Uncertain whether this nuclide is the ground state of its isotope.)	α, β^{−}, β^{+}	

=== Radionuclides with half-lives of 1 day to 10 years ===
Ordered by half-life. The second half-life column in this table has been made unsortable, as the mixture of days and years will not sort properly. Resorting by half-life may be done no less by using the number or the half-life in seconds columns.

No.	Nuclide	Z	N	Energy	Half-life (seconds)	Half-life	Decay mode	Notes
381	^{154}Eu	63	91	8.537152	2.711×10^{8}	8.592 y	β^{−}, β^{+}	FP
382	^{194}Os	76	118	8.23851	1.893×10^{8}	6.0 y	β^{−}	
383	^{228}Ra	88	140	7.944387	1.815×10^{8}	5.75 y	β^{−}	DP
384	^{146}Pm	61	85	8.61552	1.745×10^{8}	5.53 y	β^{+} (66), β^{−} (34)	
385	^{60}Co	27	33	9.098825	1.664×10^{8}	5.271 y	β^{−}	IM
386	^{155}Eu	63	92	8.534662	1.496×10^{8}	4.742 y	β^{−}	FP
387	^{101}Rh	45	56	8.93678	1.284×10^{8}	4.07 y	β^{+}	
388	^{204}Tl	81	123	8.190662	1.194×10^{8}	3.78 y	β^{−} (97), β^{+} (2.9)	IM
389	^{102m}Rh	45	57	8.92075	1.181×10^{8}	3.74 y	β^{+}, IT (0.2)	
390	^{174}Lu	71	103	8.390688	1.045×10^{8}	3.31 y	β^{+}	
391	^{208}Po	84	124	8.155305	9.145×10^{7}	2.898 y	α, β^{+}	
392	^{236}Pu	94	142	7.889532	9.019×10^{7}	2.858 y	α, SF	
393	^{125}Sb	51	74	8.77736	8.702×10^{7}	2.758 y	β^{−}	FP
394	^{55}Fe	26	29	9.116434	8.698×10^{7}	2.756 y	β^{+}	
395	^{252}Cf	98	154	7.769593	8.347×10^{7}	2.645 y	α (97), SF (3.1)	IM
396	^{147}Pm	61	86	8.609019	8.279×10^{7}	2.623 y	β^{−}	FP
397	^{22}Na	11	11	8.306836	8.211×10^{7}	2.602 y	β^{+}	CG
398	^{134}Cs	55	79	8.719760	6.517×10^{7}	2.065 y	β^{−}, β^{+}	FP
399	^{171}Tm	69	102	8.417577	6.059×10^{7}	1.92 y	β^{−}	
400	^{228}Th	90	138	7.953902	6.035×10^{7}	1.913 y	α	DP
401	^{172}Hf	72	100	8.3992	5.901×10^{7}	1.87 y	β^{+}	
402	^{179}Ta	73	106	8.352645	5.743×10^{7}	1.82 y	β^{+}	
403	^{173}Lu	71	102	8.400110	4.323×10^{7}	1.37 y	β^{+}	
404	^{252}Es	99	153	7.7646	4.075×10^{7}	1.291 y	α (78), β^{+} (22)	
405	^{109}Cd	48	61	8.88328	3.986×10^{7}	1.263 y	β^{+}	
406	^{235}Np	93	142	7.896667	3.422×10^{7}	1.084 y	β^{+}, α	
407	^{106}Ru	44	62	8.88569	3.212×10^{7}	1.018 y	β^{−}	FP
408	^{144}Pm	61	83	8.63671	3.136×10^{7}	0.99 y	β^{+}	
409	^{145}Sm	62	83	8.62753	2.938×10^{7}	340 d	β^{+}	
410	^{248}Cf	98	150	7.80020	2.881×10^{7}	333.5 d	α, SF	
411	^{49}V	23	26	9.05014	2.851×10^{7}	330 d	β^{+}	
412	^{249}Bk	97	152	7.790811	2.827×10^{7}	327.2 d	β^{−}, α, SF	
413	^{54}Mn	25	29	9.10017	2.696×10^{7}	312.08 d	β^{+}, β^{−}	IM
414	^{119m}Sn	50	69	8.827415	2.532×10^{7}	293.1 d	IT	FP
415	^{144}Ce	58	86	8.62987	2.461×10^{7}	284.89 d	β^{−}	FP
416	^{254}Es	99	155	7.74851	2.382×10^{7}	275.7 d	α, β^{−}, SF	
417	^{57}Co	27	30	9.112471	2.348×10^{7}	271.81 d	β^{+}	IM
418	^{68}Ge	32	36	9.05630	2.342×10^{7}	271.05 d	β^{+}	IM
419	^{143}Pm	61	82	8.65146	2.290×10^{7}	265 d	β^{+}	
420	^{110m2}Ag	47	63	8.86532	2.159×10^{7}	249.86 d	β^{−} (99), IT (1.3)	IM
421	^{65}Zn	30	35	9.085349	2.108×10^{7}	243.94 d	β^{+}	IM
422	^{153}Gd	64	89	8.547677	2.079×10^{7}	240.6 d	β^{+}	IM
423	^{102}Rh	45	57	8.92213	1.788×10^{7}	207 d	β^{+} (78), β^{−} (22)	
424	^{195}Au	79	116	8.238329	1.607×10^{7}	186.01 d	β^{+}	
425	^{184m}Re	75	109	8.31062	1.531×10^{7}	177.25 d	IT (75), β^{+} (25)	
426	^{194m2}Ir	77	117	8.2371	1.477×10^{7}	171 d	β^{−}	
427	^{121m}Te	52	69	8.8007	1.423×10^{7}	164.7 d	IT (89), β^{+} (11)	
428	^{242}Cm	96	146	7.844857	1.407×10^{7}	162.8 d	α, SF	
429	^{45}Ca	20	25	8.978256	1.405×10^{7}	162.61 d	β^{−}	
430	^{177m3}Lu	71	106	8.361791	1.386×10^{7}	160.4 d	β^{−} (77), IT (23)	
431	^{159}Dy	66	93	8.506332	1.248×10^{7}	144.4 d	β^{+}	
432	^{174m}Lu	71	103	8.389706	1.227×10^{7}	142 d	IT (99), ε (0.6)	
433	^{210}Po	84	126	8.147285	1.196×10^{7}	138.376 d	α	DP
434	^{139}Ce	58	81	8.69691	1.189×10^{7}	137.64 d	β^{+}	
435	^{123}Sn	50	73	8.78526	1.116×10^{7}	129.2 d	β^{−}	FP
436	^{170}Tm	69	101	8.423055	1.111×10^{7}	128.6 d	β^{−}, β^{+} (0.13)	
437	^{151}Gd	64	87	8.56264	1.070×10^{7}	123.9 d	β^{+}, α	
438	^{181}W	74	107	8.337804	1.045×10^{7}	120.96 d	β^{+}	
439	^{75}Se	34	41	9.033478	1.035×10^{7}	119.78 d	β^{+}	IM
440	^{123m}Te	52	71	8.79427	1.030×10^{7}	119.2 d	IT	
441	^{113}Sn	50	63	8.85298	9.943×10^{6}	115.08 d	β^{+}	
442	^{182}Ta	73	109	8.326432	9.914×10^{6}	114.7 d	β^{−}	
443	^{88}Y	39	49	9.02926	9.213×10^{6}	106.63 d	β^{+}	
444	^{127m}Te	52	75	8.76575	9.167×10^{6}	106.1 d	IT (98), β^{−} (2.1)	FP
445	^{257}Fm	100	157	7.72661	8.683×10^{6}	100.5 d	α, SF (0.2)	
446	^{168}Tm	69	99	8.43627	8.044×10^{6}	93.1 d	β^{+}, β^{−}	
447	^{149}Eu	63	86	8.58434	8.044×10^{6}	93.1 d	β^{+}	
448	^{185}Os	76	109	8.302701	8.031×10^{6}	92.95 d	β^{+}	
449	^{97m}Tc	43	54	8.96953	7.871×10^{6}	91.1 d	IT (96), ε (3.9)	
450	^{35}S	16	19	8.895496	7.549×10^{6}	87.37 d	β^{−}	CG
451	^{83}Rb	37	46	9.02398	7.448×10^{6}	86.2 d	β^{+}	
452	^{46}Sc	21	25	8.97918	7.237×10^{6}	83.76 d	β^{−}	IM
453	^{88}Zr	40	48	9.02165	7.206×10^{6}	83.4 d	β^{+}	
454	^{73}As	33	40	9.04328	6.938×10^{6}	80.3 d	β^{+}	
455	^{56}Co	27	29	9.072041	6.673×10^{6}	77.24 d	β^{+}	
456	^{185}W	74	111	8.305847	6.489×10^{6}	75.1 d	β^{−}	
457	^{192}Ir	77	115	8.252754	6.378×10^{6}	73.82 d	β^{−} (95), ε (4.8)	IM
458	^{160}Tb	65	95	8.495296	6.247×10^{6}	72.3 d	β^{−}	
459	^{58}Co	27	31	9.10317	6.121×10^{6}	70.84 d	β^{+}	
460	^{183}Re	75	108	8.32165	6.048×10^{6}	70 d	β^{+}	
461	^{175}Hf	72	103	8.38264	6.039×10^{6}	69.90 d	β^{+}	
462	^{188}W	74	114	8.27700	6.028×10^{6}	69.77 d	β^{−}	
463	^{85}Sr	38	47	9.02547	5.603×10^{6}	64.846 d	β^{+}	
464	^{95}Zr	40	55	8.973001	5.532×10^{6}	64.032 d	β^{−}	FP
465	^{95m}Tc	43	52	8.97639	5.363×10^{6}	62.0 d	β^{+} (96), IT (3.9)	
466	^{91m}Nb	41	50	9.02223	5.258×10^{6}	60.86 d	IT (97), ε (3.4)	
467	^{254}Cf	98	156	7.75108	5.227×10^{6}	60.5 d	SF, α (0.3)	
468	^{124}Sb	51	73	8.77792	5.194×10^{6}	60.12 d	β^{−}	
469	^{125}I	53	72	8.78201	5.131×10^{6}	59.392 d	β^{+}	IM
470	^{91}Y	39	52	9.02023	5.055×10^{6}	58.51 d	β^{−}	FP
471	^{125m}Te	52	73	8.78233	4.959×10^{6}	57.4 d	IT	FP
472	^{148}Eu	63	85	8.58684	4.709×10^{6}	54.5 d	β^{+}, α	
473	^{7}Be	4	3	5.81860	4.598×10^{6}	53.22 d	β^{+}	CG
474	^{258}Md	101	157	7.71593	4.457×10^{6}	51.6 d	α, SF	
475	^{89}Sr	38	51	9.039959	4.369×10^{6}	50.56 d	β^{−}	FP, IM
476	^{114m}In	49	65	8.846577	4.278×10^{6}	49.51 d	IT (97), β^{+} (3.2)	
477	^{146}Gd	64	82	8.59246	4.171×10^{6}	48.27 d	β^{+}	
478	^{203}Hg	80	123	8.195797	4.027×10^{6}	46.61 d	β^{−}	
479	^{237}Pu	94	143	7.881058	3.943×10^{6}	45.64 d	β^{+}, α	
480	^{115m}Cd	48	67	8.835696	3.850×10^{6}	44.6 d	β^{−}	FP
481	^{59}Fe	26	33	9.099538	3.845×10^{6}	44.50 d	β^{−}	IM
482	^{181}Hf	72	109	8.333213	3.662×10^{6}	42.39 d	β^{−}	
483	^{105}Ag	47	58	8.90057	3.567×10^{6}	41.29 d	β^{+}	
484	^{148m}Pm	61	87	8.58975	3.567×10^{6}	41.29 d	β^{−} (96), IT (4.2)	
485	^{255}Es	99	156	7.74156	3.439×10^{6}	39.8 d	β^{−} (92), α (8.0), SF	
486	^{103}Ru	44	59	8.918572	3.391×10^{6}	39.245 d	β^{−}	FP
487	^{127}Xe	54	73	8.76676	3.140×10^{6}	36.342 d	β^{+}	
488	^{184}Re	75	109	8.31164	3.059×10^{6}	35.4 d	β^{+}	
489	^{37}Ar	18	19	8.907742	3.025×10^{6}	35.01 d	β^{+}	CG
490	^{95}Nb	41	54	8.984858	3.023×10^{6}	34.991 d	β^{−}	FP
491	^{129m}Te	52	77	8.744957	2.903×10^{6}	33.6 d	IT (64), β^{−} (36)	FP
492	^{84}Rb	37	47	9.02083	2.836×10^{6}	32.82 d	β^{+} (96), β^{−} (3.9)	
493	^{241}Cm	96	145	7.848489	2.834×10^{6}	32.8 d	β^{+} (99), α (1.0)	
494	^{141}Ce	58	83	8.677212	2.808×10^{6}	32.505 d	β^{−}	FP
495	^{169}Yb	70	99	8.428570	2.766×10^{6}	32.014 d	β^{+}	IM
496	^{240}Cm	96	144	7.855801	2.627×10^{6}	30 d	α, SF	
497	^{260}Md	101	159		2.402×10^{6}	27.8 d	SF	
498	^{51}Cr	24	27	9.080156	2.393×10^{6}	27.702 d	β^{+}	IM
499	^{233}Pa	91	142	7.910419	2.331×10^{6}	26.98 d	β^{−}	DP
500	^{33}P	15	18	8.86942	2.190×10^{6}	25.35 d	β^{−}	
501	^{82}Sr	38	44	8.99827	2.190×10^{6}	25.35 d	β^{+}	IM
502	^{179m2}Hf	72	107	8.347053	2.160×10^{6}	25.0 d	IT	
503	^{234}Th	90	144	7.89776	2.083×10^{6}	24.11 d	β^{−}	DP
504	^{147}Eu	63	84	8.59883	2.082×10^{6}	24.1 d	β^{+}, α	
505	^{178}W	74	104	8.35450	1.866×10^{6}	21.6 d	β^{+}	
506	^{253}Es	99	154	7.759024	1.769×10^{6}	20.47 d	α, SF	
507	^{230}U	92	138	7.93386	1.748×10^{6}	20.23 d	α	
508	^{121}Te	52	69	8.8031	1.668×10^{6}	19.31 d	ε	
509	^{227}Th	90	137	7.957641	1.615×10^{6}	18.693 d	α	DP, IM
510	^{86}Rb	37	49	9.033493	1.611×10^{6}	18.645 d	β^{−}, β^{+}	
511	^{253}Cf	98	155	7.75787	1.539×10^{6}	17.81 d	β^{−}, α (0.3)	
512	^{74}As	33	41	9.02889	1.535×10^{6}	17.8 d	β^{+} (66), β^{−} (34)	
513	^{230}Pa	91	139	7.93143	1.503×10^{6}	17.4 d	β^{+} (92), β^{−} (7.8), α	
514	^{103}Pd	46	57	8.920415	1.468×10^{6}	16.99 d	β^{+}	IM
515	^{99}Rh	45	54	8.9358	1.391×10^{6}	16.1 d	β^{+}	
516	^{48}V	23	25	8.99794	1.380×10^{6}	15.97 d	β^{+}	
517	^{156}Eu	63	93	8.52057	1.312×10^{6}	15.19 d	β^{−}	FP
518	^{191}Os	76	115	8.261869	1.295×10^{6}	14.99 d	β^{−}	
519	^{205}Bi	83	122	8.17408	1.288×10^{6}	14.91 d	β^{+}	
520	^{225}Ra	88	137	7.97357	1.280×10^{6}	14.8 d	β^{−}, α	DP
521	^{32}P	15	17	8.830846	1.233×10^{6}	14.269 d	β^{−}	CG, IM
522	^{117m}Sn	50	67	8.841259	1.204×10^{6}	13.94 d	IT	FP
523	^{143}Pr	59	84	8.65221	1.172×10^{6}	13.57 d	β^{−}	FP
524	^{189}Ir	77	112	8.27476	1.140×10^{6}	13.2 d	β^{+}	
525	^{136}Cs	55	81	8.70616	1.124×10^{6}	13.01 d	β^{−}	
526	^{126}I	53	73	8.76902	1.117×10^{6}	12.93 d	β^{+} (53), β^{−} (47)	
527	^{140}Ba	56	84	8.66609	1.102×10^{6}	12.753 d	β^{−}	FP
528	^{126}Sb	51	75	8.7570	1.067×10^{6}	12.35 d	β^{−}	FP
529	^{202}Tl	81	121	8.199934	1.064×10^{6}	12.31 d	β^{+}	
530	^{131m}Xe	54	77	8.744980	1.032×10^{6}	11.95 d	IT	FP
531	^{190}Ir	77	113	8.264758	1.015×10^{6}	11.751 d	β^{+}	
532	^{131}Ba	56	75	8.732990	9.953×10^{5}	11.52 d	β^{+}	
533	^{71}Ge	32	39	9.05592	9.908×10^{5}	11.468 d	β^{+}	
534	^{223}Ra	88	135	7.994039	9.880×10^{5}	11.435 d	α	DP, IM
535	^{147}Nd	60	87	8.602929	9.487×10^{5}	10.98 d	β^{−}	FP
536	^{246}Pu	94	152	7.80548	9.366×10^{5}	10.84 d	β^{−}	
537	^{193m}Ir	77	116	8.249847	9.098×10^{5}	10.53 d	IT	
538	^{188}Pt	78	110	8.27249	8.778×10^{5}	10.2 d	β^{+}, α	
539	^{92m}Nb	41	51	9.00956	8.740×10^{5}	10.12 d	β^{+}	
540	^{225}Ac	89	136	7.97515	8.570×10^{5}	9.919 d	α	DP, IM
541	^{131}Cs	55	76	8.743498	8.371×10^{5}	9.69 d	β^{+}	IM
542	^{125}Sn	50	75	8.75847	8.324×10^{5}	9.63 d	β^{−}	FP
543	^{169}Er	68	101	8.431799	8.115×10^{5}	9.39 d	β^{−}	IM
544	^{149}Gd	64	85	8.57553	8.018×10^{5}	9.28 d	β^{+}, α	
545	^{167}Tm	69	98	8.445828	7.992×10^{5}	9.25 d	β^{+}	
546	^{129m}Xe	54	75	8.757054	7.672×10^{5}	8.88 d	IT	
547	^{206}Po	84	122	8.15961	7.603×10^{5}	8.8 d	β^{+} (95), α (5.4)	
548	^{72}Se	34	38	9.01393	7.258×10^{5}	8.40 d	β^{+}	
549	^{106m}Ag	47	59	8.89068	7.154×10^{5}	8.28 d	β^{+}	
550	^{171}Lu	71	100	8.40950	7.125×10^{5}	8.25 d	β^{+}	
551	^{131}I	53	78	8.738820	6.934×10^{5}	8.025 d	β^{−}	FP, IM
552	^{257}Es	99	158		6.653×10^{5}	7.7 d	β^{−}, SF	
553	^{111}Ag	47	64	8.86605	6.422×10^{5}	7.43 d	β^{−}	FP
554	^{161}Tb	65	96	8.490335	6.003×10^{5}	6.948 d	β^{−}	FP
555	^{237}U	92	145	7.879799	5.834×10^{5}	6.752 d	β^{−}	DP
556	^{172}Lu	71	101	8.40118	5.789×10^{5}	6.70 d	β^{+}	
557	^{177}Lu	71	106	8.367272	5.741×10^{5}	6.644 d	β^{−}	IM
558	^{132}Cs	55	77	8.731566	5.599×10^{5}	6.48 d	β^{+} (98), β^{−} (1.6)	
559	^{206}Bi	83	123	8.16854	5.394×10^{5}	6.243 d	β^{+}	
560	^{196}Au	79	117	8.23042	5.327×10^{5}	6.17 d	β^{+} (93), β^{−} (7)	
561	^{56}Ni	28	28	9.033954	5.249×10^{5}	6.075 d	β^{+}	
562	^{118}Te	52	66	8.8145	5.184×10^{5}	6.00 d	β^{+}	
563	^{145}Eu	63	82	8.60919	5.124×10^{5}	5.93 d	β^{+}	
564	^{120m}Sb	51	69		4.977×10^{5}	5.76 d	β^{+}	
565	^{52}Mn	25	27	9.046537	4.831×10^{5}	5.591 d	β^{+}	
566	^{148}Pm	61	87	8.59068	4.638×10^{5}	5.368 d	β^{−}	
567	^{156}Tb	65	91	8.52062	4.622×10^{5}	5.35 d	β^{+}	
568	^{133}Xe	54	79	8.73029	4.534×10^{5}	5.247 d	β^{−}	FP, IM
569	^{155}Tb	65	90	8.53100	4.523×10^{5}	5.235 d	β^{+}	
570	^{183}Ta	73	110	8.318824	4.406×10^{5}	5.1 d	β^{−}	
571	^{210}Bi	83	127	8.141756	4.330×10^{5}	5.012 d	β^{−}, α	DP
572	^{245}Bk	97	148	7.819017	4.277×10^{5}	4.95 d	β^{+}, α (0.12)	
573	^{119m}Te	52	67	8.80176	4.061×10^{5}	4.70 d	β^{+}	
574	^{146}Eu	63	83	8.59952	3.983×10^{5}	4.61 d	β^{+}	
575	^{47}Ca	20	27	8.97227	3.919×10^{5}	4.536 d	β^{−}	
576	^{234}Np	93	141	7.90057	3.802×10^{5}	4.4 d	β^{+}	
577	^{101m}Rh	45	56	8.93523	3.752×10^{5}	4.34 d	ε (93), IT (7.2)	
578	^{193m}Pt	78	115	8.249193	3.741×10^{5}	4.33 d	IT	
579	^{96}Tc	43	53	8.96530	3.698×10^{5}	4.28 d	β^{+}	
580	^{231}U	92	139	7.92497	3.629×10^{5}	4.2 d	β^{+}, α	
581	^{175}Yb	70	105	8.383864	3.616×10^{5}	4.185 d	β^{−}	
582	^{124}I	53	71	8.77587	3.608×10^{5}	4.176 d	β^{+}	IM
583	^{195m}Pt	78	117	8.238163	3.465×10^{5}	4.010 d	IT	
584	^{127}Sb	51	76	8.75398	3.326×10^{5}	3.85 d	β^{−}	FP
585	^{222}Rn	86	136	7.997570	3.302×10^{5}	3.822 d	α	DP
586	^{186}Re	75	111	8.296734	3.213×10^{5}	3.719 d	β^{−} (93), ε (7.5)	IM
587	^{224}Ra	88	136	7.987274	3.138×10^{5}	3.632 d	α	DP
588	^{100}Pd	46	54	8.9234	3.136×10^{5}	3.63 d	β^{+}	
589	^{95m}Nb	41	54	8.982377	3.119×10^{5}	3.61 d	IT (94), β^{−} (5.6)	FP
590	^{166}Dy	66	100	8.448333	2.938×10^{5}	3.40 d	β^{−}	
591	^{140}Nd	60	80	8.67315	2.912×10^{5}	3.37 d	β^{+}	
592	^{47}Sc	21	26	9.01465	2.894×10^{5}	3.349 d	β^{−}	IM
593	^{87}Y	39	48	9.02555	2.873×10^{5}	3.33 d	β^{+}	
594	^{89}Zr	40	49	9.02500	2.821×10^{5}	3.265 d	β^{+}	
595	^{67}Ga	31	36	9.06952	2.818×10^{5}	3.262 d	β^{+}	IM
596	^{132}Te	52	80	8.71668	2.768×10^{5}	3.20 d	β^{−}	FP
597	^{134}Ce	58	76	8.7044	2.730×10^{5}	3.16 d	β^{+}	
598	^{199}Au	79	120	8.217518	2.712×10^{5}	3.139 d	β^{−}	
599	^{201}Tl	81	120	8.20655	2.628×10^{5}	3.042 d	β^{+}	IM
600	^{253}Fm	100	153	7.757700	2.592×10^{5}	3.0 d	β^{+} (88), α (12)	
601	^{97}Ru	44	53	8.95916	2.451×10^{5}	2.837 d	β^{+}	
602	^{191}Pt	78	113	8.25822	2.445×10^{5}	2.83 d	β^{+}	
603	^{111}In	49	62	8.86764	2.423×10^{5}	2.805 d	β^{+}	IM
604	^{99}Mo	42	57	8.939703	2.374×10^{5}	2.747 d	β^{−}	FP, IM
605	^{122}Sb	51	71	8.79537	2.353×10^{5}	2.724 d	β^{−} (98), β^{+} (2.4)	
606	^{71}As	33	38	9.02756	2.350×10^{5}	2.721 d	β^{+}	
607	^{197}Hg	80	117	8.22634	2.337×10^{5}	2.705 d	β^{+}	
608	^{198}Au	79	119	8.220716	2.328×10^{5}	2.695 d	β^{−}	IM
609	^{182}Re	75	107		2.311×10^{5}	2.68 d	β^{+}	
610	^{90}Y	39	51	9.032395	2.306×10^{5}	2.669 d	β^{−}	FP, IM
611	^{172}Tm	69	103	8.40489	2.290×10^{5}	2.65 d	β^{−}	
612	^{67}Cu	29	38	9.07609	2.226×10^{5}	2.576 d	β^{−}	IM
613	^{44m3}Sc	21	23	8.92461	2.110×10^{5}	2.442 d	IT, β^{+}	
614	^{128}Ba	56	72	8.73826	2.100×10^{5}	2.43 d	β^{+}	
615	^{77}Br	35	42	9.02242	2.053×10^{5}	2.377 d	β^{+}	
616	^{166}Yb	70	96	8.44237	2.041×10^{5}	2.363 d	β^{+}	
617	^{239}Np	93	146	7.864996	2.036×10^{5}	2.356 d	β^{−}	DP
618	^{177}Ta	73	104	8.36349	2.029×10^{5}	2.348 d	β^{+}	
619	^{153}Tb	65	88	8.53742	2.022×10^{5}	2.34 d	β^{+}	
620	^{66}Ni	28	38	9.07141	1.966×10^{5}	2.28 d	β^{−}	
621	^{247}Pu	94	153		1.961×10^{5}	2.27 d	β^{−}	
622	^{198m2}Au	79	119	8.216616	1.963×10^{5}	2.27 d	IT	
623	^{115}Cd	48	67	8.837270	1.925×10^{5}	2.228 d	β^{−}	FP
624	^{149}Pm	61	88	8.58182	1.911×10^{5}	2.212 d	β^{−}	FP
625	^{133m}Xe	54	79	8.72854	1.899×10^{5}	2.20 d	IT	FP
626	^{203}Pb	82	121	8.19342	1.869×10^{5}	2.164 d	β^{+}	
627	^{240}Am	95	145	7.85669	1.829×10^{5}	2.12 d	β^{+}, α	
628	^{238}Np	93	145	7.871929	1.814×10^{5}	2.099 d	β^{−}	
629	^{172}Er	68	104	8.39971	1.775×10^{5}	2.05 d	β^{−}	
630	^{170}Lu	71	99	8.4084	1.738×10^{5}	2.01 d	β^{+}	
631	^{72}Zn	30	42	9.01778	1.674×10^{5}	1.938 d	β^{−}	
632	^{153}Sm	62	91	8.545567	1.666×10^{5}	1.929 d	β^{−}	FP, IM
633	^{202}Pt	78	124	8.1837	1.584×10^{5}	1.83 d	β^{−}	
634	^{48}Sc	21	27	8.9985	1.572×10^{5}	1.820 d	β^{−}	
635	^{246}Bk	97	149	7.8113	1.555×10^{5}	1.80 d	β^{+}	
636	^{195m}Hg	80	115	8.2295	1.498×10^{5}	1.733 d	IT (54), β^{+} (46)	
637	^{188}Ir	77	111	8.27528	1.494×10^{5}	1.73 d	β^{+}	
638	^{140}La	57	83	8.673547	1.450×10^{5}	1.679 d	β^{−}	FP, IM
639	^{254m}Es	99	155	7.74819	1.415×10^{5}	1.638 d	β^{−}, α (0.3), ε (0.08)	
640	^{69}Ge	32	37	9.04379	1.406×10^{5}	1.627 d	β^{+}	
641	^{133m}Ba	56	77	8.727447	1.400×10^{5}	1.621 d	IT, ε	
642	^{77}As	33	44	9.03127	1.396×10^{5}	1.616 d	β^{−}	FP
643	^{119}Sb	51	68	8.82322	1.375×10^{5}	1.591 d	β^{+}	
644	^{147}Gd	64	83	8.58395	1.370×10^{5}	1.586 d	β^{+}	
645	^{194}Au	79	115	8.23736	1.369×10^{5}	1.584 d	β^{+}	
646	^{229}Pa	91	138	7.94076	1.339×10^{5}	1.55 d	β^{+}, α (0.5)	
647	^{246}Cf	98	148	7.810789	1.285×10^{5}	1.49 d	α, SF	
648	^{57}Ni	28	29	9.05525	1.282×10^{5}	1.483 d	β^{+}	
649	^{105}Rh	45	60	8.90800	1.272×10^{5}	1.473 d	β^{−}	FP
650	^{82}Br	35	47	9.01642	1.270×10^{5}	1.470 d	β^{−}	
651	^{79}Kr	36	43	9.01362	1.261×10^{5}	1.46 d	β^{+}	
652	^{137m}Ce	58	79	8.696606	1.238×10^{5}	1.43 d	IT (99), β^{+} (0.8)	
653	^{169}Lu	71	98	8.41500	1.226×10^{5}	1.419 d	β^{+}	
654	^{143}Ce	58	85	8.64199	1.189×10^{5}	1.377 d	β^{−}	FP
655	^{251}Es	99	152	7.77446	1.188×10^{5}	1.38 d	β^{+}, α (0.5)	
656	^{131m}Te	52	79	8.720393	1.169×10^{5}	1.353 d	β^{−} (74), IT (26)	FP
657	^{83}Sr	38	45	8.99660	1.167×10^{5}	1.350 d	β^{+}	
658	^{129}Cs	55	74	8.74960	1.154×10^{5}	1.336 d	β^{+}	
659	^{232}Pa	91	141	7.91637	1.140×10^{5}	1.32 d	β^{−}	
660	^{165}Tm	69	96	8.45271	1.082×10^{5}	1.253 d	β^{+}	
661	^{193}Os	76	117	8.24435	1.074×10^{5}	1.243 d	β^{−}	
662	^{226}Ac	89	137	7.96376	1.057×10^{5}	1.224 d	β^{−} (83), β^{+} (17), α	
663	^{160}Er	68	92	8.4842	1.029×10^{5}	1.191 d	β^{+}	
664	^{151}Pm	61	90	8.55732	1.022×10^{5}	1.183 d	β^{−}	FP
665	^{135m}Ba	56	79	8.720077	1.012×10^{5}	1.171 d	IT	
666	^{121}Sn	50	71	8.808480	9.731×10^{4}	1.126 d	β^{−}	FP
667	^{166}Ho	67	99	8.451260	9.652×10^{4}	1.117 d	β^{−}	IM
668	^{76}As	33	43	9.02252	9.446×10^{4}	1.093 d	β^{−}	
669	^{200}Tl	81	119	8.20655	9.396×10^{4}	1.088 d	β^{+}	
670	^{72}As	33	39	9.01896	9.360×10^{4}	1.083 d	β^{+}	
671	^{231}Th	90	141	7.924929	9.187×10^{4}	1.063 d	β^{−}	DP
672	^{252}Fm	100	152	7.76649	9.140×10^{4}	1.058 d	α, SF	
673	^{156m2}Tb	65	91		8.78×10^{4}	1.02 d	IT	
674	^{189}Re	75	114	8.27227	8.748×10^{4}	1.01 d	β^{−}	

=== Radionuclides with half-lives of 1 hour to 1 day ===
Ordered by half-life.

No.	Nuclide	Z	N	Energy	Half-life (seconds)	Half-life (hours)	Decay mode	Notes
675	^{197m}Hg	80	117	8.22483	8.575×10^{4}	23.82	IT	
676	^{187}W	74	113	8.284708	8.571×10^{4}	23.81	β^{−}	
677	^{248m}Bk	97	151	7.79669	8.532×10^{4}	23.7	β^{−} (70), ε (30)	
678	^{173}Hf	72	101	8.3916	8.496×10^{4}	23.6	β^{+}	
679	^{96}Nb	41	55	8.963014	8.406×10^{4}	23.35	β^{−}	
680	^{154m2}Tb	65	89		8.17×10^{4}	22.7	β^{+}	
681	^{236m}Np	93	143	7.88726	8.1×10^{4}	22.5	ε (50), β^{−} (50)	
682	^{43}K	19	24	8.921909	8.028×10^{4}	22.3	β^{−}	
683	^{228}Pa	91	137	7.94446	7.92×10^{4}	22	β^{+} (98), α (2)	
684	^{182}Os	76	106	8.3164	7.862×10^{4}	21.8	β^{+}	
685	^{48}Cr	24	24	8.9634	7.762×10^{4}	21.56	β^{+}	
686	^{154m1}Tb	65	89		7.74×10^{4}	21.5	β^{+}	
687	^{200}Pb	82	118	8.20257	7.740×10^{4}	21.5	β^{+}	
688	^{112}Pd	46	66	8.84204	7.574×10^{4}	21.0	β^{−}	FP
689	^{28}Mg	12	16	8.607745	7.529×10^{4}	20.92	β^{−}	CG
690	^{133}I	53	80	8.71686	7.499×10^{4}	20.83	β^{−}	FP
691	^{100}Rh	45	55	8.9272	7.488×10^{4}	20.8	β^{+}	
692	^{122}Xe	54	68	8.77095	7.236×10^{4}	20.1	β^{+}	
693	^{255}Fm	100	155	7.74269	7.225×10^{4}	20.07	α, SF	
694	^{181}Re	75	106	8.32832	7.164×10^{4}	19.9	β^{+}	
695	^{197}Pt	78	119	8.225733	7.161×10^{4}	19.89	β^{−}	
696	^{194}Ir	77	117	8.239008	6.966×10^{4}	19.35	β^{−}	
697	^{95}Tc	43	52	8.97680	6.933×10^{4}	19.26	β^{+}	
698	^{142}Pr	59	83	8.66136	6.883×10^{4}	19.1	β^{−}, ε	
699	^{135}La	57	78	8.71312	6.808×10^{4}	18.91	β^{+}	
700	^{200m}Au	79	121	8.2025	6.732×10^{4}	18.7	β^{−} (84), IT (16)	
701	^{159}Gd	64	95	8.502525	6.652×10^{4}	18.48	β^{−}	FP
702	^{152}Tb	65	87	8.5366	6.436×10^{4}	17.88	β^{+}	
703	^{135}Ce	58	77	8.69810	6.372×10^{4}	17.7	β^{+}	
704	^{193}Au	79	114	8.24440	6.354×10^{4}	17.7	β^{+}	
705	^{151}Tb	65	86	8.54565	6.339×10^{4}	17.61	β^{+}, α	
706	^{55}Co	27	28	9.053682	6.311×10^{4}	17.53	β^{+}	
707	^{188}Re	75	113	8.278855	6.122×10^{4}	17.01	β^{−}	IM
708	^{125}Xe	54	71	8.76891	6.073×10^{4}	16.87	β^{+}	
709	^{97}Zr	40	57	8.926336	6.030×10^{4}	16.75	β^{−}	FP
710	^{186}Ir	77	109	8.28192	5.990×10^{4}	16.64	β^{+}	
711	^{86}Zr	40	46	8.97793	5.940×10^{4}	16.5	β^{+}	
712	^{76}Br	35	41	8.9962	5.832×10^{4}	16.2	β^{+}	
713	^{119}Te	52	67	8.80395	5.778×10^{4}	16.05	β^{+}	
714	^{242}Am	95	147	7.842111	5.767×10^{4}	16.02	β^{−} (83), ε (17)	
715	^{170}Hf	72	98	8.4022	5.764×10^{4}	16.0	β^{+}	
716	^{268}Db	105	163		5.76×10^{4}	16 (Note: These superheavy isotopes have large statistical uncertainties in their half-lives because only a small number of atoms have been counted one at a time. They are given in their originally reported form with two significant figures, but would not deserve it by the standards applied to other isotopes. The actual uncertainty can be found through the isotope link.)	α (51), SF (49)	
717	^{157}Eu	63	94	8.51373	5.465×10^{4}	15.18	β^{−}	FP
718	^{24}Na	11	13	8.422064	5.384×10^{4}	14.96	β^{−}	CG, IM
719	^{76}Kr	36	40	8.97940	5.328×10^{4}	14.8	β^{+}	
720	^{86}Y	39	47	8.9932	5.306×10^{4}	14.74	β^{+}	
721	^{90}Nb	41	49	8.98978	5.256×10^{4}	14.60	β^{+}	
722	^{211}Rn	86	125	8.11281	5.256×10^{4}	14.6	β^{+} (73), α (27)	
723	^{185}Ir	77	108	8.28192	5.184×10^{4}	14.4	β^{+}	
724	^{182m}Re	75	107	8.3207	5.090×10^{4}	14.1	β^{+}	
725	^{240}U	92	148	7.85167	5.076×10^{4}	14.1	β^{−}	
726	^{72}Ga	31	41	9.02393	5.049×10^{4}	14.03	β^{−}	
727	^{69m}Zn	30	39	9.05653	4.949×10^{4}	13.75	IT, β^{−}	
728	^{109}Pd	46	63	8.87505	4.892×10^{4}	13.6	β^{−}	FP
729	^{87m}Y	39	48	9.02118	4.813×10^{4}	13.37	IT (98), β^{+} (1.6)	
730	^{123}I	53	70	8.78630	4.760×10^{4}	13.2	β^{+}	IM
731	^{191m}Os	76	115	8.261479	4.716×10^{4}	13.10	IT	
732	^{183}Os	76	107	8.3099	4.680×10^{4}	13.0	β^{+}	
733	^{150m}Eu	63	87	8.56965	4.608×10^{4}	12.8	β^{−} (89), β^{+}(11)	
734	^{64}Cu	29	35	9.093574	4.572×10^{4}	12.70	β^{+} (62), β^{−} (38)	IM
735	^{200}Pt	78	122	8.2043	4.536×10^{4}	12.6	β^{−}	
736	^{130}I	53	77	8.74006	4.450×10^{4}	12.36	β^{−}	
737	^{42}K	19	23	8.905176	4.448×10^{4}	12.36	β^{−}	IM
738	^{171}Hf	72	99	8.3955	4.356×10^{4}	12.1	β^{+}	
739	^{239}Am	95	144	7.864664	4.284×10^{4}	11.9	β^{+}, α	
740	^{193m}Hg	80	113	8.23153	4.248×10^{4}	11.8	β^{+} (93), IT (7.2)	
741	^{203}Bi	83	120	8.17735	4.234×10^{4}	11.76	β^{+}	
742	^{204}Bi	83	121	8.17252	4.039×10^{4}	11.22	β^{+}	
743	^{77}Ge	32	45	8.996161	4.036×10^{4}	11.21	β^{−}	FP
744	^{266}Lr	103	163		3.96×10^{4}	11	SF	
745	^{189}Pt	78	111	8.26428	3.913×10^{4}	10.9	β^{+}	
746	^{195}Hg	80	115	8.2304	3.848×10^{4}	10.7	β^{+}	
747	^{212}Pb	82	130	8.106926	3.826×10^{4}	10.63	β^{−}	DP, IM
748	^{175}Ta	73	102	8.3708	3.78×10^{4}	10.5	β^{+}	
749	^{187}Ir	77	110	8.2828	3.78×10^{4}	10.5	β^{+}	
750	^{245}Pu	94	151	7.81345	3.78×10^{4}	10.5	β^{−}	
751	^{165}Er	68	97	8.462357	3.730×10^{4}	10.36	β^{+}	
752	^{93}Y	39	54	8.9770	3.665×10^{4}	10.18	β^{−}	FP
753	^{244}Am	95	149	7.825912	3.604×10^{4}	10.01	β^{−}	
754	^{154}Tb	65	89	8.5269	3.598×10^{4}	9.99	β^{+}	
755	^{155}Dy	66	89	8.51749	3.564×10^{4}	9.9	β^{+}	
756	^{183m}Os	76	107	8.3090	3.564×10^{4}	9.9	β^{+} (85), IT(15)	
757	^{91}Sr	38	53	8.99057	3.474×10^{4}	9.65	β^{−}	FP
758	^{196m2}Au	79	117	8.22715	3.457×10^{4}	9.60	IT	
759	^{156}Sm	62	94	8.51594	3.384×10^{4}	9.4	β^{−}	FP
760	^{127}Te	52	75	8.76644	3.366×10^{4}	9.35	β^{−}	FP
761	^{201}Pb	82	119	8.19704	3.359×10^{4}	9.33	β^{+}	
762	^{152m}Eu	63	89	8.550548	3.352×10^{4}	9.31	β^{-} (73), β^{+}(27)	
763	^{66}Ga	31	35	9.03683	3.349×10^{4}	9.30	β^{+}	
764	^{62}Zn	30	32	9.057900	3.309×10^{4}	9.19	β^{+}	
765	^{135}Xe	54	81	8.71141	3.290×10^{4}	9.14	β^{−}	FP
766	^{128}Sb	51	77	8.7325	3.244×10^{4}	9.01	β^{−}	FP
767	^{137}Ce	58	79	8.698463	3.24×10^{4}	9.0	β^{+}	
768	^{58m}Co	27	31	9.10274	3.187×10^{4}	8.85	IT, β^{+}	
769	^{234}Pu	94	140	7.89888	3.168×10^{4}	8.8	β^{+} (94), α (6)	
770	^{184}Ta	73	111	8.3041	3.132×10^{4}	8.7	β^{−}	
771	^{250}Es	99	151		3.096×10^{4}	8.6	β^{+}	
772	^{101}Pd	46	55	8.91718	3.049×10^{4}	8.47	β^{+}	
773	^{52}Fe	26	26	9.000782	2.979×10^{4}	8.28	β^{+}	
774	^{173}Tm	69	104	8.39650	2.966×10^{4}	8.24	β^{−}	
775	^{180}Ta	73	107	8.34317	2.935×10^{4}	8.15	ε (85), β^{−} (15)	
776	^{157}Dy	66	91	8.51352	2.930×10^{4}	8.14	β^{+}	
777	^{210}At	85	125	8.12833	2.916×10^{4}	8.1	β^{+}, α (0.2)	
778	^{176}Ta	73	103	8.3632	2.912×10^{4}	8.09	β^{+}	
779	^{166}Tm	69	97	8.44413	2.772×10^{4}	7.70	β^{+}	
780	^{256}Es	99	157		2.736×10^{4}	7.6	β^{−}	
781	^{171}Er	68	103	8.408849	2.706×10^{4}	7.52	β^{−}	
782	^{199}Tl	81	118	8.2123	2.671×10^{4}	7.42	β^{+}	
783	^{211}At	85	126	8.12652	2.597×10^{4}	7.21	β^{+} (58), α (42)	IM
784	^{73}Se	34	39	9.00593	2.574×10^{4}	7.15	β^{+}	
785	^{93m}Mo	42	51	8.978653	2.466×10^{4}	6.85	IT, β^{+} (0.1)	
786	^{234}Pa	91	143	7.89893	2.412×10^{4}	6.70	β^{−}	DP
787	^{135}I	53	82	8.69190	2.369×10^{4}	6.58	β^{−}	FP
788	^{107}Cd	48	59	8.88431	2.340×10^{4}	6.50	β^{+}	
789	^{82m}Rb	37	45	8.99960	2.330×10^{4}	6.47	β^{+}	
790	^{153}Dy	66	87	8.52323	2.304×10^{4}	6.4	β^{+}, α	
791	^{127}Cs	55	72	8.75037	2.250×10^{4}	6.25	β^{+}	
792	^{228}Ac	89	139	7.944587	2.214×10^{4}	6.15	β^{−}	DP
793	^{99m}Tc	43	56	8.951977	2.162×10^{4}	6.01	IT, β^{−}	FP, IM
794	^{145}Pr	59	86	8.62046	2.154×10^{4}	5.98	β^{−}	FP
795	^{189m}Os	76	113	8.277435	2.092×10^{4}	5.81	IT	
796	^{207}Po	84	123	8.15415	2.088×10^{4}	5.80	β^{+}, α	
797	^{111m}Pd	46	65	8.844414	2.003×10^{4}	5.56	IT (77), β^{−} (23)	
798	^{90}Mo	42	48	8.96213	2.002×10^{4}	5.56	β^{+}	
799	^{180m}Hf	72	108	8.341529	1.991×10^{4}	5.53	IT, β^{−} (0.3)	
800	^{257}Md	101	156	7.725044	1.987×10^{4}	5.52	ε (85), α (15)	
801	^{139m}Nd	60	79	8.6597	1.980×10^{4}	5.50	β^{+} (87), IT (13)	
802	^{209}At	85	124	8.13296	1.951×10^{4}	5.42	β^{+} (96), α (3.9)	
803	^{113}Ag	47	66	8.8415	1.933×10^{4}	5.37	β^{−}	
804	^{156m1}Tb	65	91	8.52006	1.908×10^{4}	5.3	IT	
805	^{198}Tl	81	117	8.21035	1.908×10^{4}	5.3	β^{+}	
806	^{251}Fm	100	151	7.76869	1.908×10^{4}	5.30	β^{+} (98), α (1.8)	
807	^{133m}Ce	58	75	8.6907	1.836×10^{4}	5.1	β^{+}	
808	^{138}Nd	60	78	8.66564	1.814×10^{4}	5.04	β^{+}	
809	^{160m}Ho	67	93	8.48583	1.807×10^{4}	5.02	IT (73), β^{+} (27)	
810	^{244}Bk	97	147	7.82249	1.807×10^{4}	5.02	β^{+}, α	
811	^{118m2}Sb	51	67	8.81493	1.800×10^{4}	5.00	β^{+}	
812	^{243}Pu	94	149	7.83364	1.784×10^{4}	4.96	β^{−}	
813	^{192}Au	79	113	8.24201	1.778×10^{4}	4.94	β^{+}	
814	^{110}In	49	61	8.8574	1.771×10^{4}	4.92	β^{+}	
815	^{94}Tc	43	51	8.96662	1.758×10^{4}	4.88	β^{+}	
816	^{85m}Y	39	46	8.9869	1.750×10^{4}	4.86	β^{+}	
817	^{73}Ga	31	42	9.02610	1.750×10^{4}	4.86	β^{−}	
818	^{192}Hg	80	112	8.23804	1.746×10^{4}	4.85	β^{+}	
819	^{99m}Rh	45	54	8.9352	1.69×10^{4}	4.7	β^{+}	
820	^{243}Bk	97	146	7.82980	1.66×10^{4}	4.6	β^{+}, α (0.15)	
821	^{264}Lr	103	161		1.66×10^{4}	4.6	SF	
822	^{132}La	57	75	8.7056	1.652×10^{4}	4.59	β^{+}	
823	^{179}Lu	71	108	8.34539	1.652×10^{4}	4.59	β^{−}	
824	^{81}Rb	37	44	9.00289	1.646×10^{4}	4.57	β^{+}	IM
825	^{115m}In	49	66	8.846971	1.615×10^{4}	4.49	IT (95), β^{−} (5.0)	FP
826	^{85m}Kr	36	49	9.02632	1.613×10^{4}	4.48	β^{−} (79), IT (21)	FP
827	^{105}Ru	44	61	8.88974	1.598×10^{4}	4.44	β^{−}	FP
828	^{80m}Br	35	45	9.01886	1.591×10^{4}	4.42	IT	
829	^{139}Pr	59	80	8.68160	1.588×10^{4}	4.41	β^{+}	
830	^{129}Sb	51	78	8.7274	1.584×10^{4}	4.40	β^{−}	FP
831	^{109}In	49	60	8.86480	1.497×10^{4}	4.16	β^{+}	
832	^{110}Sn	50	60	8.8517	1.495×10^{4}	4.15	β^{+}	
833	^{71m}Zn	30	41	9.01739	1.493×10^{4}	4.15	β^{−}	
834	^{184}Hf	72	112	8.2969	1.483×10^{4}	4.12	β^{−}	
835	^{149}Tb	65	84	8.55111	1.482×10^{4}	4.12	β^{+} (83), α (17)	
836	^{44}Sc	21	23	8.93077	1.455×10^{4}	4.04	β^{+}	
837	^{262}Lr	103	159		1.44×10^{4}	4	β^{+}, SF	
838	^{141}La	57	84	8.65947	1.411×10^{4}	3.92	β^{−}	FP
839	^{133}La	57	76	8.7141	1.408×10^{4}	3.91	β^{+}	
840	^{43}Sc	21	22	8.91290	1.401×10^{4}	3.89	β^{+}	
841	^{193}Hg	80	113	8.23226	1.368×10^{4}	3.80	β^{+}	
842	^{195m}Ir	77	118	8.23333	1.346×10^{4}	3.74	β^{−}	
843	^{176m}Lu	71	105	8.373929	1.319×10^{4}	3.66	β^{−}, ε (0.1)	
844	^{202m}Pb	82	120	8.18900	1.274×10^{4}	3.54	IT (90), β^{+} (9.5)	
845	^{92}Y	39	53	8.99323	1.274×10^{4}	3.54	β^{−}	FP
846	^{204}Po	84	120	8.16122	1.267×10^{4}	3.52	β^{+} (99), α (0.7)	
847	^{132}Ce	58	74	8.6961	1.264×10^{4}	3.51	β^{+}	
848	^{150}Tb	65	85	8.54536	1.253×10^{4}	3.48	β^{+}	
849	^{117m}Cd	48	69	8.808771	1.239×10^{4}	3.44	β^{−}	FP
850	^{61}Cu	29	32	9.08745	1.203×10^{4}	3.34	β^{+}	
851	^{254}Fm	100	154	7.752804	1.166×10^{4}	3.24	α, SF (0.06)	
852	^{209}Pb	82	127	8.155598	1.165×10^{4}	3.24	β^{−}	DP
853	^{90m}Y	39	51	9.024817	1.161×10^{4}	3.23	IT, β^{−}	
854	^{250}Bk	97	153	7.77951	1.156×10^{4}	3.21	β^{−}	
855	^{161}Er	68	93	8.47629	1.156×10^{4}	3.21	β^{+}	
856	^{191}Au	79	112	8.24827	1.145×10^{4}	3.18	β^{+}	
857	^{173}Ta	73	100	8.3742	1.130×10^{4}	3.14	β^{+}	
858	^{112}Ag	47	65	8.84439	1.127×10^{4}	3.13	β^{−}	
859	^{247}Cf	98	149	7.80367	1.120×10^{4}	3.11	β^{+}, α	
860	^{167}Ho	67	100	8.44425	1.116×10^{4}	3.1	β^{−}	
861	^{190m}Re	75	115	8.25752	1.116×10^{4}	3.1	β^{−} (54), IT (46)	
862	^{184}Ir	77	107	8.2866	1.112×10^{4}	3.09	β^{+}	
863	^{190m3}Ir	77	113	8.262777	1.111×10^{4}	3.09	β^{+} (91), IT (8.6)	
864	^{45}Ti	22	23	8.93821	1.109×10^{4}	3.08	β^{+}	
865	^{134m}Cs	55	79	8.718724	1.048×10^{4}	2.91	IT, ε (0.3)	
866	^{197}Tl	81	116	8.21525	1.022×10^{4}	2.84	β^{+}	
867	^{38}S	16	22	8.7782	1.022×10^{4}	2.84	β^{−}	
868	^{88}Kr	36	52	8.97690	1.017×10^{4}	2.83	β^{−}	FP
869	^{87m}Sr	38	49	9.042485	1.010×10^{4}	2.81	IT, ε (0.3)	
870	^{117}Sb	51	66	8.82892	1.008×10^{4}	2.80	β^{+}	
871	^{224}Ac	89	135	7.98099	1.001×10^{4}	2.78	β^{+} (91), α (9.5)	
872	^{93}Tc	43	50	8.97031	9.90×10^{3}	2.75	β^{+}	
873	^{150}Pm	61	89	8.5620	9.713×10^{3}	2.70	β^{−}	
874	^{85}Y	39	46	8.9871	9.648×10^{3}	2.68	β^{+}	
875	^{31}Si	14	17	8.811610	9.430×10^{3}	2.62	β^{−}	CG
876	^{256}Fm	100	156	7.73739	9.426×10^{3}	2.62	SF (92), α (8.1)	
877	^{92}Sr	38	54	8.97205	9.400×10^{3}	2.61	β^{−}	FP
878	^{56}Mn	25	31	9.087598	9.284×10^{3}	2.58	β^{−}	
879	^{65}Ni	28	37	9.073254	9.063×10^{3}	2.52	β^{−}	
880	^{117}Cd	48	69	8.809937	9.011×10^{3}	2.50	β^{−}	FP
881	^{176}W	74	102	8.3591	9.00×10^{3}	2.5	β^{+}	
882	^{239}Cm	96	143		9.00×10^{3}	2.5	β^{+}, α	
883	^{116}Te	52	64	8.8064	8.964×10^{3}	2.49	β^{+}	
884	^{141}Nd	60	81	8.66842	8.964×10^{3}	2.49	β^{+}	
885	^{161}Ho	67	94	8.48869	8.928×10^{3}	2.48	β^{+}	
886	^{210}Rn	86	124	8.11706	8.640×10^{3}	2.40	α (96), β^{+} (4)	
887	^{198}Pb	82	116	8.20297	8.640×10^{3}	2.4	β^{+}	
888	^{152}Dy	66	86	8.53262	8.568×10^{3}	2.38	β^{+}, α (0.1)	IM
889	^{83}Br	35	48	9.02329	8.546×10^{3}	2.37	β^{−}	FP
890	^{178}Ta	73	105		8.496×10^{3}	2.36	β^{+}	
891	^{187}Pt	78	109	8.2675	8.460×10^{3}	2.35	β^{+}	
892	^{165}Dy	66	99	8.456847	8.395×10^{3}	2.33	β^{−}	IM
893	^{132}I	53	79	8.72059	8.262×10^{3}	2.30	β^{−}	FP
894	^{158}Er	68	90	8.4846	8.24×10^{3}	2.29	β^{+}	
895	^{195}Ir	77	118	8.233843	8.24×10^{3}	2.29	β^{−}	
896	^{66}Ge	32	34	9.00476	8.136×10^{3}	2.26	β^{+}	
897	^{129}Ba	56	73	8.73071	8.028×10^{3}	2.23	β^{+}	
898	^{250m}Es	99	151		7.99×10^{3}	2.22	β^{+}	
899	^{177}W	74	103	8.3521	7.94×10^{3}	2.21	β^{+}	
900	^{238}Cm	96	142	7.86357	7.92×10^{3}	2.2	β^{+} (96), α (3.8), SF	
901	^{106m}Rh	45	61	8.88482	7.86×10^{3}	2.18	β^{−}	
902	^{129m}Ba	56	73	8.73064	7.686×10^{3}	2.14	β^{+}	
903	^{138m}Pr	59	79	8.6712	7.632×10^{3}	2.12	β^{+}	
904	^{121}I	53	68	8.78409	7.632×10^{3}	2.12	β^{+}	
905	^{127}Sn	50	77	8.72856	7.560×10^{3}	2.10	β^{−}	FP
906	^{123}Xe	54	69	8.76439	7.488×10^{3}	2.08	β^{+}	
907	^{186}Pt	78	108	8.2749	7.488×10^{3}	2.08	β^{+}, α	
908	^{245}Am	95	150	7.818663	7.380×10^{3}	2.05	β^{−}	
909	^{89}Nb	41	48	8.9772	7.308×10^{3}	2.03	β^{+}	
910	^{117m}In	49	68	8.82882	6.972×10^{3}	1.94	β^{−} (53), IT (47)	FP
911	^{186m}Ir	77	109	8.28191	6.912×10^{3}	1.92	β^{+} (~75), IT (~25)	
912	^{177}Yb	70	107	8.359377	6.880×10^{3}	1.91	β^{−}	
913	^{198m}Tl	81	117	8.20761	6.732×10^{3}	1.87	β^{+} (56), IT (44)	
914	^{196}Tl	81	115	8.21161	6.624×10^{3}	1.84	β^{+}	
915	^{83m2}Kr	36	47	9.034560	6.588×10^{3}	1.83	IT	FP
916	^{18}F	9	9	8.02281	6.584×10^{3}	1.83	β^{+}	CG, IM
917	^{41}Ar	18	23	8.877842	6.577×10^{3}	1.83	β^{−}	CG
918	^{163}Tm	69	94	8.45615	6.516×10^{3}	1.81	β^{+}	
919	^{207}At	85	122	8.13522	6.516×10^{3}	1.81	β^{+} (~90), α (~10)	
920	^{239}Pa	91	148		6.48×10^{3}	1.8	β^{−}	
921	^{224}Rn	86	138	7.97112	6.420×10^{3}	1.78	β^{−}	
922	^{80}Sr	38	42	8.95021	6.378×10^{3}	1.77	β^{+}	
923	^{181}Os	76	105	8.3119	6.30×10^{3}	1.75	β^{+}	
924	^{205}Po	84	121	8.15679	6.264×10^{3}	1.74	β^{+}, α	
925	^{149}Nd	60	89	8.57048	6.221×10^{3}	1.73	β^{−}	FP
926	^{202}Bi	83	119	8.17405	6.19×10^{3}	1.72	β^{+}	
927	^{201}Bi	83	118	8.17793	6.18×10^{3}	1.72	β^{+}	
928	^{249}Es	99	150		6.132×10^{3}	1.70	β^{+} (99), α (0.6)	
929	^{87}Zr	40	47	8.98335	6.048×10^{3}	1.68	β^{+}	
930	^{126}Ba	56	70	8.72743	6.00×10^{3}	1.67	β^{+}	
931	^{113m}In	49	64	8.858711	5.968×10^{3}	1.66	IT	
932	^{61}Co	27	34	9.10244	5.936×10^{3}	1.65	β^{−}	
933	^{147}Tb	65	82	8.55256	5.90×10^{3}	1.64	β^{+}	
934	^{238}Am	95	143	7.8679	5.880×10^{3}	1.63	β^{+}, α	
935	^{208}At	85	123	8.13127	5.868×10^{3}	1.63	β^{+} (99), α (0.6)	
936	^{133}Ce	58	75	8.6910	5.82×10^{3}	1.62	β^{+}	
937	^{75}Br	35	40	8.99274	5.80×10^{3}	1.61	β^{+}	
938	^{95}Ru	44	51	8.9498	5.785×10^{3}	1.61	β^{+}	
939	^{259}Md	101	158		5.76×10^{3}	1.60	SF	
940	^{152m5}Eu	63	89	8.549875	5.748×10^{3}	1.60	IT	
941	^{197m}Pt	78	119	8.223706	5.725×10^{3}	1.59	IT (97), β^{−} (3.3)	
942	^{230}Ra	88	142	7.92125	5.580×10^{3}	1.55	β^{−}	
943	^{142}La	57	85	8.63487	5.466×10^{3}	1.52	β^{−}	FP
944	^{78}As	33	45	9.0049	5.442×10^{3}	1.51	β^{−}	FP
945	^{199}Pb	82	117	8.19811	5.40×10^{3}	1.5	β^{+}	
946	^{78}Ge	32	46	8.99263	5.28×10^{3}	1.47	β^{−}	FP
947	^{255}Cf	98	157		5.10×10^{3}	1.42	β^{−}	
948	^{196m}Tl	81	115	8.20960	5.076×10^{3}	1.41	β^{+} (96), IT (3.8)	
949	^{196m}Ir	77	119	8.2204	5.040×10^{3}	1.40	β^{−}	
950	^{267}Db	105	162		5.04×10^{3}	1.4	SF	
951	^{132m}I	53	79	8.71976	4.993×10^{3}	1.39	IT (86), β^{−} (14)	FP
952	^{139}Ba	56	83	8.682210	4.976×10^{3}	1.38	β^{−}	FP
953	^{75}Ge	32	43	9.029411	4.967×10^{3}	1.38	β^{−}	
954	^{120}I	53	67	8.7692	4.900×10^{3}	1.36	β^{+}	
955	^{256}Md	101	155		4.662×10^{3}	1.30	β^{+} (91), α (9.2)	
956	^{137}Pr	59	78	8.67863	4.608×10^{3}	1.28	β^{+}	
957	^{87}Kr	36	51	8.999014	4.578×10^{3}	1.27	β^{−}	FP
958	^{164}Yb	70	94	8.44334	4.548×10^{3}	1.26	β^{+}	
959	^{163}Er	68	95	8.47112	4.500×10^{3}	1.25	β^{+}	
960	^{178}Yb	70	108	8.35040	4.440×10^{3}	1.23	β^{−}	
961	^{237}Am	95	142		4.416×10^{3}	1.23	β^{+}, α	
962	^{77}Kr	36	41	8.98261	4.368×10^{3}	1.21	β^{+}	
963	^{142}Sm	62	80	8.62753	4.349×10^{3}	1.21	β^{+}	
964	^{97}Nb	41	56	8.95382	4.326×10^{3}	1.20	β^{−}	FP
965	^{185}Pt	78	107	8.2696	4.254×10^{3}	1.18	β^{+}	
966	^{195}Tl	81	114	8.21570	4.176×10^{3}	1.16	β^{+}	
967	^{129}Te	52	77	8.745775	4.176×10^{3}	1.16	β^{−}	FP
968	^{104}Ag	47	57	8.88974	4.152×10^{3}	1.15	β^{+}	
969	^{110m}In	49	61	8.8568	4.146×10^{3}	1.15	β^{+}	
970	^{174}Ta	73	101	8.3687	4.104×10^{3}	1.14	β^{+}	
971	^{68}Ga	31	37	9.05788	4.071×10^{3}	1.13	β^{+}	IM
972	^{85m}Sr	38	47	9.02267	4.058×10^{3}	1.13	IT (87), β^{+} (13)	
973	^{190m}Ir	77	113	8.264621	4.032×10^{3}	1.12	IT	
974	^{162m}Ho	67	95	8.47832	4.020×10^{3}	1.12	IT (62), β^{+} (38)	
975	^{204m2}Pb	82	122	8.183690	4.016×10^{3}	1.12	IT	
976	^{89m}Nb	41	48		3.96×10^{3}	1.10	β^{+}	
977	^{103}Ag	47	56	8.89465	3.942×10^{3}	1.10	β^{+}	
978	^{249}Cm	96	153	7.787179	3.849×10^{3}	1.07	β^{−}	
979	^{229}Ac	89	140	7.93730	3.762×10^{3}	1.05	β^{−}	
980	^{117}Te	52	65	8.7986	3.720×10^{3}	1.03	β^{+}	
981	^{240}Np	93	147	7.85333	3.714×10^{3}	1.03	β^{−}	
982	^{182m}Hf	72	110	8.31790	3.69×10^{3}	1.03	β^{−} (54), IT (46)	
983	^{183}Hf	72	111	8.3078	3.665×10^{3}	1.02	β^{−}	
984	^{212}Bi	83	129	8.109610	3.633×10^{3}	1.01	β^{−} (64), α (36)	DP
985	^{116m2}Sb	51	65	8.8165	3.618×10^{3}	1.01	β^{+}	
986	^{148}Tb	65	83	8.54792	3.60×10^{3}	1.00	β^{+}	
987	^{270}Db	105	165		3.6×10^{3}	1.0	α (~87), SF (~13)	

== See also ==
- Isotope geochemistry
- List of elements by stability of isotopes
- List of radioactive nuclides by half-life
- Monoisotopic element
- Mononuclidic element
- Primordial nuclide
- Radionuclide
- Stable nuclide
- Table of nuclides
