= Thulium-170 =

Isotope of thulium

General
- Symbol: ^{170}Tm
- Names: Thulium-170
- Protons (Z): 69
- Neutrons (N): 101

Nuclide data
- Natural abundance: Synthetic
- Half-life (t_{1/2}): 128.6±0.3 d
- Isotope mass: 169.93580709(79) Da
- Spin: 1^{−}
- Binding energy: 1377937.45±0.73 keV
- Decay products: ^{170}Yb^{170}Er

Decay modes
- Decay mode: Decay energy (MeV)
- β^{−}: 0.968
- EC: 0.312

Thulium-170 (^{170}Tm or Tm-170) is a radioactive isotope of thulium proposed for use in radiotherapy and in radioisotope thermoelectric generators.

== Properties ==
Thulium-170 has a half-life of 128.6 days, decaying by β^{−} to ^{170}Yb about 99.87% of the time, and by electron capture to ^{170}Er about 0.13% of the time. About 18.1% of β^{−} decays populate an excited state of ^{170}Yb at 84.25474(8) keV and this produces the main gamma ray emission from ^{170}Tm; lower-energy photons are also produced through X-ray fluorescence at 7.42, 51.354, 52.389, 59.159, 59.383, and 60.962 keV.

The ground state of thulium-170 has a spin of 1^{−}. The charge radius is 5.2303(36) fm, the magnetic moment is 0.2458(17) μ_{N}, and the electric quadrupole moment is 0.72(5) e⋅b.

== Proposed applications ==
As a rare-earth element, thulium-170 can be used as the pure metal or thulium hydride, but the most common form is as thulium oxide (Tm_{2}O_{3}) due to the refractory properties of that compound. The isotope can be prepared in a reactor by neutron irradiation of natural thulium, which has a high neutron capture cross section of 103 barns.

=== Medicine ===
In 1953, the Atomic Energy Research Establishment introduced thulium-170 as a candidate for radiography in medical and steelmaking contexts, but this was deemed unsuitable due to the predominant high-energy bremsstrahlung radiation, poor results on thin specimens, and long exposure times. However, ^{170}Tm has been proposed for radiotherapy because the isotope is simple to prepare into a biocompatible form, and the low-energy radiation can selectively irradiate diseased tissue without causing collateral damage.

=== Radiothermal generator ===
^{170}Tm_{2}O_{3} has been proposed as a radiothermal source due to it being safer, cheaper, and more environmentally friendly than commonly used materials that contain isotopes such as plutonium-238. The heat output from a ^{170}Tm source is initially much greater than from a ^{238}Pu source relative to mass, but it declines rapidly due to its shorter half-life.

Lighter: thulium-169	Thulium-170 is an isotope of thulium	Heavier: thulium-171
Decay product of: —	Decay chain of thulium-170	Decays to: erbium-170 ytterbium-170
