= Isotopes of lutetium =

Isotopes of lutetium (_{71}Lu)
Main isotopes			Decay	
Isotope	abundance	half-life (t_{1/2})	mode	product
^{173}Lu	synth	1.37 y	ε	^{173}Yb
^{174}Lu	synth	3.31 y	β^{+}	^{174}Yb
^{175}Lu	97.4%	stable		
^{176}Lu	2.60%	3.701×10^{10} y	β^{−}	^{176}Hf
^{177}Lu	synth	6.6443 d	β^{−}	^{177}Hf

Standard atomic weight A_{r}°(Lu)
- 174.96669±0.00005; 174.97±0.01 (abridged)

Naturally occurring lutetium (_{71}Lu) is composed of one stable isotope ^{175}Lu (97.40% natural abundance) and one long-lived radioisotope, ^{176}Lu with a half-life of 37 billion years (2.60% natural abundance). Forty synthetic radioisotopes have been added from ^{149}Lu to ^{190}Lu, with the most stable being ^{174}Lu with a half-life of 3.31 years and ^{173}Lu with a half-life of 1.37 years. All of the remaining radioactive isotopes have half-lives that are less than 9 days, and the majority of these have half-lives that are less than half an hour. Of the meta states known for this element, the most stable are ^{177m3}Lu (t_{1/2} 160.4 days) and ^{174m}Lu (t_{1/2} 142 days).

The primary decay mode before the most abundant stable isotope, ^{175}Lu, is electron capture (with some alpha and positron emission), leading to ytterbium or less often thulium isotopes, and the primary mode after is beta emission giving hafnium isotopes.

All isotopes of lutetium are either radioactive or, for the lone stable isotope ^{175}Lu, observationally stable, meaning that it is predicted to be radioactive (to alpha decay) but no decay has been observed.

== List of isotopes ==
Nuclide (Note: ^{m}Lu – Excited nuclear isomer.)	Z	N	Isotopic mass (Da) (Note: ( ) – Uncertainty (1σ) is given in concise form in parentheses after the corresponding last digits.) (Note: # – Atomic mass marked #: value and uncertainty derived not from purely experimental data, but at least partly from trends from the Mass Surface (TMS).)	Discovery year	Half-life (Note: Bold half-life – nearly stable, half-life longer than age of universe.) (Note: # – Values marked # are not purely derived from experimental data, but at least partly from trends of neighboring nuclides (TNN).)	Decay mode (Note: Modes of decay: EC: / Electron capture; IT: / Isomeric transition; p: / Proton emission)	Daughter isotope (Note: Bold symbol as daughter – Daughter product is stable.)	Spin and parity (Note: ( ) spin value – Indicates spin with weak assignment arguments.)	Natural abundance (mole fraction)	
Nuclide	Excitation energy			Discovery year	Half-life	Decay mode	Daughter isotope	Spin and parity	Normal proportion	Range of variation
^{149}Lu	71	78		2022	450+170 −100 ns	p	^{148}Yb	11/2−		
^{150}Lu	71	79	149.97341(32)#	1993	45(3) ms	p	^{149}Yb	(5−)		
^{150m}Lu	22(5) keV			2000	40(7) μs	p	^{149}Yb	(8+)		
^{151}Lu	71	80	150.96747(32)#	1982	78.4(9) ms	p (?%)	^{150}Yb	11/2−		
^{151}Lu	71	80	150.96747(32)#	1982	78.4(9) ms	β^{+} (?%)	^{151}Yb	11/2−		
^{151m}Lu	57(4) keV			1999	16.0(5) μs	p	^{150}Yb	3/2+		
^{152}Lu	71	81	151.96412(21)#	1987	650(70) ms	β^{+} (85%)	^{152}Yb	(4−, 5−, 6−)		
^{152}Lu	71	81	151.96412(21)#	1987	650(70) ms	β^{+}, p (15%)	^{151}Tm	(4−, 5−, 6−)		
^{153}Lu	71	82	152.95880(16)	1989	0.9(2) s	α (?%)	^{149}Tm	11/2−		
^{153}Lu	71	82	152.95880(16)	1989	0.9(2) s	β^{+} (?%)	^{153}Yb	11/2−		
^{153m1}Lu	80(5) keV			(1997) (Note: Half-life not measured, not included in discovery database)	1# s	IT	^{153}Lu	1/2+		
^{153m2}Lu	2502.5(4) keV			1989	>0.1 μs	IT	^{153}Lu	23/2−		
^{153m3}Lu	2632.9(5) keV			1989	15(3) μs	IT	^{153}Lu	27/2−		
^{154}Lu	71	83	153.95742(22)#	1981	1# s			(2−)		
^{154m1}Lu	62(12) keV			1981	1.12(8) s	β^{+} (?%)	^{154}Yb	(9+)		
^{154m1}Lu	62(12) keV			1981	1.12(8) s	β^{+}p (?%)	^{153}Tm	(9+)		
^{154m1}Lu	62(12) keV			1981	1.12(8) s	β^{+}α (?%)	^{150}Er	(9+)		
^{154m2}Lu	2724(100)# keV			1990	35(3) μs	IT	^{154}Lu	(17+)		
^{155}Lu	71	84	154.954326(21)	1965	68(2) ms	α (90%)	^{151}Tm	11/2−		
^{155}Lu	71	84	154.954326(21)	1965	68(2) ms	β^{+} (10%)	^{155}Yb	11/2−		
^{155m1}Lu	21(4) keV			1989	138(9) ms	α (76%)	^{151}Tm	1/2+		
^{155m1}Lu	21(4) keV			1989	138(9) ms	β^{+} (24%)	^{155}Yb	1/2+		
^{155m2}Lu	1780.3(18) keV			1989	2.69(3) ms	α	^{151}Tm	25/2−#		
^{156}Lu	71	85	155.953087(58)	1965	494(12) ms	α	^{152}Tm	(2)−		
^{156m1}Lu (Note: Order of ground state and isomer is uncertain.)	10(250) keV			1979	198(2) ms	α	^{152}Tm	10+		
^{156m2}Lu	2611(250) keV			2018	179(4) ns	IT	^{156}Lu	19−		
^{157}Lu	71	86	156.950145(13)	1977	7.7(20) s	β^{+} (?%)	^{157}Yb	(1/2+)		
^{157}Lu	71	86	156.950145(13)	1977	7.7(20) s	α (?%)	^{153}Tm	(1/2+)		
^{157m}Lu	20.9(20) keV			1991	4.79(12) s	β^{+} (92.3%)	^{157}Yb	(11/2−)		
^{157m}Lu	20.9(20) keV			1991	4.79(12) s	α (7.7%)	^{153}Tm	(11/2−)		
^{158}Lu	71	87	157.949316(16)	1979	10.6(3) s	β^{+} (99.09%)	^{158}Yb	(2)−		
^{158}Lu	71	87	157.949316(16)	1979	10.6(3) s	α (0.91%)	^{154}Tm	(2)−		
^{159}Lu	71	88	158.946636(40)	1980	12.1(10) s	β^{+}	^{159}Yb	1/2+		
^{159}Lu	71	88	158.946636(40)	1980	12.1(10) s	α (rare)	^{155}Tm	1/2+		
^{160}Lu	71	89	159.946033(61)	1979	36.1(3) s	β^{+}	^{160}Yb	2−#		
^{160m}Lu	0(100)# keV			1980	40(1) s	β^{+}	^{160}Yb			
^{161}Lu	71	90	160.943572(30)	1973	77(2) s	β^{+}	^{161}Yb	1/2+		
^{161m}Lu	182(5)# keV			1979	7.3(4) ms	IT	^{161}Lu	(9/2−)		
^{162}Lu	71	91	161.943283(81)	1978	1.37(2) min	β^{+}	^{162}Yb	1−		
^{162m1}Lu	120(200)# keV			(1980) (Note: Only published in a conference proceeding and not a refereed journal)	1.5 min	β^{+}	^{162}Yb	4−#		
^{162m2}Lu (Note: Discovery of this isotope is disputed.)	300(200)# keV			(1980)	1.9 min			9−#		
^{163}Lu	71	92	162.941179(30)	1979	3.97(13) min	β^{+}	^{163}Yb	1/2+		
^{164}Lu	71	93	163.941339(30)	1977	3.14(3) min	β^{+}	^{164}Yb	1−		
^{165}Lu	71	94	164.939407(28)	1973	10.74(10) min	β^{+}	^{165}Yb	1/2+		
^{166}Lu	71	95	165.939859(32)	1969	2.65(10) min	β^{+}	^{166}Yb	6−		
^{166m1}Lu	34.37(22) keV			1974	1.41(10) min	β^{+} (58%)	^{166}Yb	3−		
^{166m1}Lu	34.37(22) keV			1974	1.41(10) min	IT (42%)	^{166}Lu	3−		
^{166m2}Lu	43.0(4) keV			1974	2.12(10) min	β^{+} (90%)	^{166}Yb	0−		
^{166m2}Lu	43.0(4) keV			1974	2.12(10) min	IT (10%)	^{166}Lu	0−		
^{167}Lu	71	96	166.938243(40)	1958	51.5(10) min	β^{+}	^{167}Yb	7/2+		
^{167m}Lu	50(40)# keV			1998	>1 min			1/2+		
^{168}Lu	71	97	167.938730(41)	1960	5.5(1) min	β^{+}	^{168}Yb	6−		
^{168m}Lu	160(40) keV			1972	6.7(4) min	β^{+}	^{168}Yb	3+		
^{169}Lu	71	98	168.9376458(32)	1955	34.06(5) h	β^{+}	^{169}Yb	7/2+		
^{169m}Lu	29.0(5) keV			1965	160(10) s	IT	^{169}Lu	1/2−		
^{170}Lu	71	99	169.938479(18)	1951	2.012(30) d	β^{+}	^{170}Yb	0+		
^{170m}Lu	92.91(9) keV			1965	670(100) ms	IT	^{170}Lu	4−		
^{171}Lu	71	100	170.9379186(20)	1951	8.247(23) d	β^{+}	^{171}Yb	7/2+		
^{171m}Lu	71.13(8) keV			1965	79(2) s	IT	^{171}Lu	1/2−		
^{172}Lu	71	101	171.9390913(25)	1951	6.70(3) d	β^{+}	^{172}Yb	4−		
^{172m1}Lu	41.86(4) keV			1962	3.7(5) min	IT	^{172}Lu	1−		
^{172m2}Lu	65.79(4) keV			1965	332(20) ns	IT	^{172}Lu	(1)+		
^{172m3}Lu	109.41(10) keV			1965	440(12) μs	IT	^{172}Lu	(1)+		
^{172m4}Lu	213.57(17) keV			(1974)	150 ns	IT	^{172}Lu	(6−)		
^{173}Lu	71	102	172.9389357(17)	1951	1.37(1) y	EC	^{173}Yb	7/2+		
^{173m}Lu	123.672(13) keV			1959	74.2(10) μs	IT	^{173}Lu	5/2−		
^{174}Lu	71	103	173.9403428(17)	1951	3.31(5) y	β^{+}	^{174}Yb	1−		
^{174m1}Lu	170.83(5) keV			1960	142(2) d	IT (99.38%)	^{174}Lu	6−		
^{174m1}Lu	170.83(5) keV			1960	142(2) d	EC (0.62%)	^{174}Yb	6−		
^{174m2}Lu	240.818(4) keV			1980	395(15) ns	IT	^{174}Lu	3+		
^{174m3}Lu	365.183(6) keV			1980	145(3) ns	IT	^{174}Lu	4−		
^{174m4}Lu	1855.7(5) keV			2006	194(24) ns	IT	^{174}Lu	13+		
^{174m5}Lu	4068.4(9) keV			2009	97(10) ns	IT	^{174}Lu	(21+)		
^{174m6}Lu	5849.6(9) keV			2009	242(19) ns	IT	^{174}Lu	(26−)		
^{175}Lu	71	104	174.9407772(13)	1934	Observationally stable (Note: Believed to undergo α decay to ^{171}Tm)			7/2+	0.97401(13)	
^{175m1}Lu	353.48(13) keV			1965	1.49(7) μs	IT	^{175}Lu	5/2−		
^{175m2}Lu	1392.4(4) keV			1998	984(30) μs	IT	^{175}Lu	19/2+		
^{176}Lu (Note: primordial radionuclide) (Note: Used in lutetium-hafnium dating)	71	105	175.9426917(13)	1935	3.701(17)×10^{10} y	β^{−} (Note: Theoretically capable of electron capture to ^{176}Yb or α decay to ^{172}Tm)	^{176}Hf	7−	0.02599(13)	
^{176m1}Lu	122.845(4) keV			1939	3.664(19) h	β^{−} (99.90%)	^{176}Hf	1−		
^{176m1}Lu	122.845(4) keV			1939	3.664(19) h	EC (0.095%)	^{176}Yb	1−		
^{176m2}Lu	1514.5(5) keV			2000	312(69) ns	IT	^{176}Lu	12+		
^{176m3}Lu	1587.8(6) keV			2000	40(3) μs	IT	^{176}Lu	14+		
^{177}Lu	71	106	176.9437636(13)	1945	6.6443(9) d	β^{−}	^{177}Hf	7/2+		
^{177m1}Lu	150.3984(10) keV			1949	130.1(24) ns	IT	^{177}Lu	9/2−		
^{177m2}Lu	569.6721(15) keV			1965	155(7) μs	IT	^{177}Lu	1/2+		
^{177m3}Lu	970.1757(24) keV			1962	160.4(3) d	β^{−} (77.30%)	^{177}Hf	23/2−		
^{177m3}Lu	970.1757(24) keV			1962	160.4(3) d	IT (22.70%)	^{177}Lu	23/2−		
^{177m4}Lu	2771.7(5) keV			2004	625(62) ns	IT	^{177}Lu	33/2+		
^{177m5}Lu	3530.4(6) keV			2004	6(2) μs	IT	^{177}Lu	39/2−		
^{178}Lu	71	107	177.9459601(24)	1957	28.4(2) min	β^{−}	^{178}Hf	1+		
^{178m}Lu	123.8(26) keV			1961	23.1(3) min	β^{−}	^{178}Hf	9−		
^{179}Lu	71	108	178.9473330(55)	1961	4.59(6) h	β^{−}	^{179}Hf	7/2+		
^{179m}Lu	592.4(4) keV			1993	3.1(9) ms	IT	^{179}Lu	1/2+		
^{180}Lu	71	109	179.949891(76)	1971	5.7(1) min	β^{−}	^{180}Hf	5+		
^{180m1}Lu	13.9(3) keV			1995	~1 s			3−		
^{180m2}Lu	624.0(5) keV			2001	>1 ms	IT	^{180}Lu	(9−)		
^{181}Lu	71	110	180.95191(14)	1982	3.5(3) min	β^{−}	^{181}Hf	7/2+#		
^{182}Lu	71	111	181.95516(22)#	1982	2.0(2) min	β^{−}	^{182}Hf	1−#		
^{183}Lu	71	112	182.957363(86)	1983	58(4) s	β^{−}	^{183}Hf	7/2+#		
^{184}Lu	71	113	183.96103(22)#	1989	20(3) s	β^{−}	^{184}Hf	(3+)		
^{185}Lu	71	114	184.96354(32)#	2012	20# s [>300 ns]			7/2+#		
^{186}Lu	71	115	185.96745(43)#	2012	6# s [>300 ns]					
^{187}Lu	71	116	186.97019(43)#	2012	7# s [>300 ns]			7/2+#		
^{188}Lu	71	117	187.97443(43)#	2012	1# s [>300 ns]					
^{189}Lu	71	118		2023						
^{190}Lu	71	119		2024						
^{191}Lu	71	120		2026						
This table header & footer:

== Lutetium-177 ==
Lutetium (^{177}Lu), which decays with the emission of a low-energy electron, is useful for treating some cancerous tumors. Several compounds of ^{177}Lu are available for this purpose:

1) Lutetium chloride, LuCl_{3}, sold under the brand name Lumark among others, is used for radiolabeling other medicines, either as an anti-cancer therapy or for scintigraphy (medical radio-imaging). Its most common side effects are anaemia (low red blood cell counts), thrombocytopenia (low blood platelet counts), leucopenia (low white blood cell counts), lymphopenia (low levels of lymphocytes, a particular type of white blood cell), nausea (feeling sick), vomiting and mild and temporary hair loss.

2) Lutetium (177Lu) oxodotreotide, also known as Lutetium (^{177}Lu) dotatate ("Lutathera"), has been approved for some types of tumors.

3) Lutetium (177Lu) vipivotide tetraxetan ("Pluvicto") has also been approved.

== See also ==
Daughter products other than lutetium

- Isotopes of hafnium
- Isotopes of ytterbium
- Isotopes of thulium
- Isotopes of erbium
