= Isotopes of ytterbium =

Isotopes of ytterbium (_{70}Yb)
Main isotopes			Decay	
Isotope	abundance	half-life (t_{1/2})	mode	product
^{166}Yb	synth	56.7 h	ε	^{166}Tm
^{168}Yb	0.126%	stable		
^{169}Yb	synth	32.014 d	ε	^{169}Tm
^{170}Yb	3.02%	stable		
^{171}Yb	14.2%	stable		
^{172}Yb	21.8%	stable		
^{173}Yb	16.1%	stable		
^{174}Yb	31.9%	stable		
^{175}Yb	synth	4.185 d	β^{−}	^{175}Lu
^{176}Yb	12.9%	stable		

Standard atomic weight A_{r}°(Yb)
- 173.045±0.010; 173.05±0.02 (abridged)

Naturally occurring ytterbium (_{70}Yb) is composed of seven stable isotopes: (Note: However, all seven of the isotopes are observationally stable, meaning that they are predicted to be radioactive but decay has not been observed yet.) ^{168}Yb, ^{170}Yb–^{174}Yb, and ^{176}Yb, with ^{174}Yb being the most abundant (31.90% natural abundance). 30 radioisotopes have been characterized, with the most stable being ^{169}Yb with a half-life of 32.014 days, ^{175}Yb with a half-life of 4.185 days, and ^{166}Yb with a half-life of 56.7 hours. All of the remaining radioactive isotopes have half-lives that are less than 2 hours, with the majority of them being less than 20 minutes. This element also has 18 meta states, with the most stable being ^{169m}Yb (half-life 46 seconds).

The known isotopes of ytterbium range from ^{149}Yb to ^{189}Yb. The primary decay mode before the most abundant stable isotope, ^{174}Yb is electron capture giving thulium isotopes; the primary mode after is beta emission giving lutetium isotopes. Of interest to modern quantum optics, the different ytterbium isotopes follow either Bose–Einstein statistics or Fermi–Dirac statistics, leading to different behavior in optical lattices.

== List of isotopes ==
Nuclide (Note: ^{m}Yb – Excited nuclear isomer.)	Z	N	Isotopic mass (Da) (Note: ( ) – Uncertainty (1σ) is given in concise form in parentheses after the corresponding last digits.) (Note: # – Atomic mass marked #: value and uncertainty derived not from purely experimental data, but at least partly from trends from the Mass Surface (TMS).)	Discovery year	Half-life (Note: # – Values marked # are not purely derived from experimental data, but at least partly from trends of neighboring nuclides (TNN).)	Decay mode (Note: Modes of decay: EC: / Electron capture; IT: / Isomeric transition)	Daughter isotope (Note: Bold symbol as daughter – Daughter product is stable.)	Spin and parity (Note: ( ) spin value – Indicates spin with weak assignment arguments.)	Natural abundance (mole fraction)	
Nuclide	Excitation energy			Discovery year	Half-life	Decay mode	Daughter isotope	Spin and parity	Normal proportion	Range of variation
^{147}Yb	70	77		2026	>310 ns					
^{148}Yb	70	78	147.96755(43)#	2026	250# ms [>310 ns]			0+		
^{149}Yb	70	79	148.96422(32)#	2001	0.7(2) s	β^{+}, p	^{148}Er	(1/2+)		
^{149}Yb	70	79	148.96422(32)#	2001	0.7(2) s	β^{+} (rare)	^{149}Tm	(1/2+)		
^{150}Yb	70	80	149.95831(32)#	2021	700# ms [>200 ns]	β^{+}?	^{150}Tm	0+		
^{150m}Yb	2872.0(20) keV			2026	620(50) ns	IT	^{150}Yb	(10+)		
^{151}Yb	70	81	150.95540(32)	1985	1.6(5) s	β^{+}	^{151}Tm	(1/2+)		
^{151}Yb	70	81	150.95540(32)	1985	1.6(5) s	β^{+}, p (rare)	^{150}Er	(1/2+)		
^{151m1}Yb	740(100)# keV			1985	1.6(5) s	β^{+}	^{151}Tm	(11/2−)		
^{151m1}Yb	740(100)# keV			1985	1.6(5) s	β^{+}, p (rare)	^{150}Er	(11/2−)		
^{151m2}Yb	2630(141)# keV			1993	2.6(7) μs	IT	^{151}Yb	19/2−#		
^{151m3}Yb	3287(141)# keV			1993	20(1) μs	IT	^{151}Yb	27/2−#		
^{152}Yb	70	82	151.95033(16)	1982	3.03(6) s	β^{+}	^{152}Tm	0+		
^{152m}Yb	2744.5(10) keV			1982	30(1) μs	IT	^{152}Yb	(10+)		
^{153}Yb	70	83	152.94937(22)#	1977	4.2(2) s	β^{+}	^{153}Tm	7/2−		
^{153}Yb	70	83	152.94937(22)#	1977	4.2(2) s	β^{+}, p (0.008%)	^{152}Er	7/2−		
^{153m}Yb	2630(50)# keV			1989	15(1) μs	IT	^{153}Yb	27/2−		
^{154}Yb	70	84	153.946396(19)	1964	0.409(2) s	α (92.6%)	^{150}Er	0+		
^{154}Yb	70	84	153.946396(19)	1964	0.409(2) s	β^{+} (7.4%)	^{154}Tm	0+		
^{155}Yb	70	85	154.945783(18)	1964	1.793(20) s	α (89%)	^{151}Er	(7/2−)		
^{155}Yb	70	85	154.945783(18)	1964	1.793(20) s	β^{+} (11%)	^{155}Tm	(7/2−)		
^{156}Yb	70	86	155.942817(10)	1970	26.1(7) s	β^{+} (90%)	^{156}Tm	0+		
^{156}Yb	70	86	155.942817(10)	1970	26.1(7) s	α (10%)	^{152}Er	0+		
^{157}Yb	70	87	156.942651(12)	1970	38.6(10) s	β^{+}	^{157}Tm	7/2−		
^{157}Yb	70	87	156.942651(12)	1970	38.6(10) s	α (rare)	^{153}Er	7/2−		
^{158}Yb	70	88	157.939871(9)	1967	1.49(13) min	β^{+} (99.99%)	^{158}Tm	0+		
^{158}Yb	70	88	157.939871(9)	1967	1.49(13) min	α (.0021%)	^{154}Er	0+		
^{159}Yb	70	89	158.940060(19)	1975	1.67(9) min	β^{+}	^{159}Tm	5/2−		
^{160}Yb	70	90	159.937559(6)	1967	4.8(2) min	β^{+}	^{160}Tm	0+		
^{161}Yb	70	91	160.937912(16)	1974	4.2(2) min	β^{+}	^{161}Tm	3/2−		
^{162}Yb	70	92	161.935779(16)	1963	18.87(19) min	β^{+}	^{162}Tm	0+		
^{163}Yb	70	93	162.936345(16)	1967	11.05(35) min	β^{+}	^{163}Tm	3/2−		
^{164}Yb	70	94	163.934501(16)	1960	75.8(17) min	EC	^{164}Tm	0+		
^{165}Yb	70	95	164.935270(28)	1964	9.9(3) min	β^{+}	^{165}Tm	5/2−		
^{165m}Yb	126.80(9) keV			1974	300(30) ns	IT	^{165}Yb	9/2+		
^{166}Yb	70	96	165.933876(8)	1954	56.7(1) h	EC	^{166}Tm	0+		
^{167}Yb	70	97	166.934954(4)	1954	17.5(2) min	β^{+}	^{167}Tm	5/2−		
^{167m}Yb	571.548(22) keV			1976	~180 ns	IT	^{167}Yb	11/2−		
^{168}Yb	70	98	167.93389130(10)	1938	Observationally Stable (Note: Believed to undergo α decay to ^{164}Er or β^{+}β^{+} decay to ^{168}Er with a half-life over 130×10^{12} years)			0+	0.00123(3)	
^{169}Yb	70	99	168.93518421(19)	1946	32.014(5) d	EC	^{169}Tm	7/2+		
^{169m}Yb	24.1999(16) keV			1960	46(2) s	IT	^{169}Yb	1/2−		
^{170}Yb	70	100	169.934767243(11)	1938	Observationally Stable (Note: Believed to undergo α decay to ^{166}Er)			0+	0.02982(39)	
^{170m}Yb	1258.46(14) keV			1979	370(15) ns	IT	^{170}Yb	4−		
^{171}Yb	70	101	170.936331515(14)	1934	Observationally Stable (Note: Believed to undergo α decay to ^{167}Er)			1/2−	0.14086(140)	
^{171m1}Yb	95.282(2) keV			1974	5.25(24) ms	IT	^{171}Yb	7/2+		
^{171m2}Yb	122.416(2) keV			1968	265(20) ns	IT	^{171}Yb	5/2−		
^{172}Yb	70	102	171.936386654(15)	1934	Observationally Stable (Note: Believed to undergo α decay to ^{168}Er)			0+	0.21686(130)	
^{172m}Yb	1550.43(6) keV			1969	3.6(1) μs	IT	^{172}Yb	6−		
^{173}Yb	70	103	172.938216212(12)	1934	Observationally Stable (Note: Believed to undergo α decay to ^{169}Er)			5/2−	0.16103(63)	
^{173m}Yb	398.9(5) keV			1963	2.9(1) μs	IT	^{173}Yb	1/2−		
^{174}Yb	70	104	173.938867546(12)	1934	Observationally Stable (Note: Believed to undergo α decay to ^{170}Er)			0+	0.32025(80)	
^{174m1}Yb	1518.148(13) keV			1964	830(40) μs	IT	^{174}Yb	6+		
^{174m2}Yb	1765.2(5) keV			2005	256(11) ns	IT	^{174}Yb	7−		
^{175}Yb	70	105	174.94128191(8)	1945	4.185(1) d	β^{−}	^{175}Lu	7/2−		
^{175m}Yb	514.866(4) keV			1960	68.2(3) ms	IT	^{175}Yb	1/2−		
^{176}Yb	70	106	175.942574706(16)	1934	Observationally Stable (Note: Believed to undergo α decay to ^{172}Er or β^{−}β^{−} decay to ^{176}Hf with a half-life over 160×10^{15} years)			0+	0.12995(83)	
^{176m}Yb	1049.8(6) keV			1962	11.4(3) s	IT	^{176}Yb	8−		
^{176m}Yb	1049.8(6) keV			1962	11.4(3) s	β^{−} (<10#%)	^{176}Lu	8−		
^{177}Yb	70	107	176.94526385(24)	1945	1.911(3) h	β^{−}	^{177}Lu	9/2+		
^{177m}Yb	331.5(3) keV			1960	6.41(2) s	IT	^{177}Yb	1/2−		
^{178}Yb	70	108	177.946669(7)	1973	74(3) min	β^{−}	^{178}Lu	0+		
^{179}Yb	70	109	178.94993(22)#	1982	8.0(4) min	β^{−}	^{179}Lu	(1/2−)		
^{180}Yb	70	110	179.95199(32)#	1987	2.4(5) min	β^{−}	^{180}Lu	0+		
^{181}Yb	70	111	180.95589(32)#	2012	1# min [>300 ns]	β^{−}?	^{181}Lu	3/2−#		
^{182}Yb	70	112	181.95824(43)#	2012	30# s [>300 ns]	β^{−}?	^{182}Lu	0+		
^{183}Yb	70	113	182.96243(43)#	2012	30# s [>300 ns]	β^{−}?	^{183}Lu	3/2−#		
^{184}Yb	70	114	183.96500(54)#	2012	7# s [>300 ns]	β^{−}?	^{184}Lu	0+		
^{185}Yb	70	115	184.96943(54)#	2012	5# s [>300 ns]	β^{−}?	^{185}Lu	9/2−#		
^{186}Yb	70	116		2024				0+		
^{187}Yb	70	117		2024						
^{188}Yb	70	118		2026						
^{189}Yb	70	119		2026						
This table header & footer:

== See also ==
Daughter products other than ytterbium

- Isotopes of lutetium
- Isotopes of thulium
- Isotopes of erbium
