= Isotopes of thulium =

Isotopes of thulium (_{69}Tm)
Main isotopes			Decay	
Isotope	abundance	half-life (t_{1/2})	mode	product
^{167}Tm	synth	9.25 d	ε	^{167}Er
^{168}Tm	synth	93.1 d	β^{+}	^{168}Er
^{169}Tm	100%	stable		
^{170}Tm	synth	128.6 d	β^{−}	^{170}Yb
^{171}Tm	synth	1.92 y	β^{−}	^{171}Yb

Standard atomic weight A_{r}°(Tm)
- 168.934219±0.000005; 168.93±0.01 (abridged)

Naturally occurring thulium (_{69}Tm) is composed of one stable isotope, ^{169}Tm, with 100% natural abundance. Thirty-nine radioisotopes have been characterized from ^{144}Tm to ^{183}Tm; with the most stable are ^{171}Tm with a half-life of 1.92 years, ^{170}Tm with a half-life of 128.6 days, ^{168}Tm with a half-life of 93.1 days, and ^{167}Tm with a half-life of 9.25 days. All of the remaining radioactive isotopes have half-lives that are less than 3 days, with the majority less than 10 minutes. This element also has 26 meta states, with the longest half-lives being ^{164m}Tm (5.1 minutes), ^{160m1}Tm (75 seconds) and ^{155m}Tm (45 seconds).

The primary decay mode before the stable isotope, ^{169}Tm, is electron capture to erbium isotopes, and the primary mode after is beta emission to ytterbium isotopes. All isotopes of thulium are either radioactive or, in the case of ^{169}Tm, observationally stable, meaning that ^{169}Tm is predicted to be radioactive but decay has not been observed.

== List of isotopes ==
Nuclide (Note: ^{m}Tm – Excited nuclear isomer.)	Z	N	Isotopic mass (Da) (Note: ( ) – Uncertainty (1σ) is given in concise form in parentheses after the corresponding last digits.) (Note: # – Atomic mass marked #: value and uncertainty derived not from purely experimental data, but at least partly from trends from the Mass Surface (TMS).)	Discovery year	Half-life (Note: # – Values marked # are not purely derived from experimental data, but at least partly from trends of neighboring nuclides (TNN).)	Decay mode (Note: Modes of decay: EC: / Electron capture; IT: / Isomeric transition; p: / Proton emission)	Daughter isotope (Note: Bold symbol as daughter – Daughter product is stable.)	Spin and parity (Note: ( ) spin value – Indicates spin with weak assignment arguments.)	Isotopic abundance
Nuclide	Excitation energy			Discovery year	Half-life	Decay mode	Daughter isotope	Spin and parity	Isotopic abundance
^{144}Tm	69	75	143.97621(43)#	2026	2.3(9) μs	p	^{143}Er	(10+)	
^{145}Tm	69	76	144.97039(21)#	1998	3.17(20) μs	p	^{144}Er	(11/2−)	
^{146}Tm	69	77	145.96666(22)#	1993	155(20) ms	p	^{145}Er	(1+)	
^{146m1}Tm	304(6) keV			(2005) (Note: Only published in a conference proceeding and not a refereed journal)	73(7) ms	p	^{145}Er	(5−)	
^{146m2}Tm	437(7) keV			2006	200(3) ms	p	^{145}Er	(10+)	
^{147}Tm	69	78	146.9613799(73)	1982	0.58(3) s	β^{+} (85%)	^{147}Er	11/2−	
^{147}Tm	69	78	146.9613799(73)	1982	0.58(3) s	p (15%)	^{146}Er	11/2−	
^{147m}Tm	62(5) keV			1993	360(40) μs	p	^{146}Er	3/2+	
^{148}Tm	69	79	147.958384(11)	1982	0.7(2) s	β^{+}	^{148}Er	(10+)	
^{149}Tm	69	80	148.95283(22)#	1987	0.9(2) s	β^{+} (99.74%)	^{149}Er	11/2−	
^{149}Tm	69	80	148.95283(22)#	1987	0.9(2) s	β^{+}, p (0.26%)	^{148}Ho	11/2−	
^{150}Tm	69	81	149.95009(21)#	1982	3# s	β^{+}	^{150}Er	(1+)	
^{150m1}Tm (Note: Order of ground state and isomer is uncertain.)	140(140)# keV			(1988) (Note: Not clear that the isomer is different from the ground state, not included in discovery database)	2.20(6) s	β^{+} (98.9%)	^{150}Er	(6−)	
^{150m1}Tm	140(140)# keV			(1988)	2.20(6) s	β^{+}, p (1.1%)	^{149}Ho	(6−)	
^{150m2}Tm	811(140)# keV			1984	5.2(3) ms	IT	^{150m1}Tm	10+#	
^{151}Tm	69	82	150.945494(21)	1982	4.17(11) s	β^{+}	^{151}Er	(11/2−)	
^{151m1}Tm	93(6) keV			1988	6.6(20) s	β^{+}	^{151}Er	(1/2+)	
^{151m2}Tm	2655.67(22) keV			1982	451(34) ns	IT	^{151}Tm	(27/2−)	
^{152}Tm	69	83	151.944476(58)	1980	8.0(10) s	β^{+}	^{152}Er	(2)−	
^{152m1}Tm	−100(250) keV			1982	5.2(6) s	β^{+}	^{152}Er	(9)+	
^{152m2}Tm	2455(250) keV			1986	301(7) ns	IT	^{152}Tm	(17+)	
^{153}Tm	69	84	152.942058(13)	1964	1.48(1) s	α (91%)	^{149}Ho	(11/2−)	
^{153}Tm	69	84	152.942058(13)	1964	1.48(1) s	β^{+} (9%)	^{153}Er	(11/2−)	
^{153m}Tm	43.2(2) keV			1989	2.5(2) s	α (92%)	^{149}Ho	(1/2+)	
^{153m}Tm	43.2(2) keV			1989	2.5(2) s	β^{+} (8%)	^{153}Er	(1/2+)	
^{154}Tm	69	85	153.941570(15)	1964	8.1(3) s	β^{+} (54%)	^{154}Er	(2)−	
^{154}Tm	69	85	153.941570(15)	1964	8.1(3) s	α (46%)	^{150}Ho	(2)−	
^{154m}Tm	70(50) keV			1964	3.30(7) s	α (58%)	^{150}Ho	(9)+	
^{154m}Tm	70(50) keV			1964	3.30(7) s	β^{+} (42%)	^{154}Er	(9)+	
^{155}Tm	69	86	154.939210(11)	1971	21.6(2) s	β^{+} (99.17%)	^{155}Er	11/2−	
^{155}Tm	69	86	154.939210(11)	1971	21.6(2) s	α (0.83%)	^{151}Ho	11/2−	
^{155m}Tm	41(6) keV			1990	45(4) s	β^{+}	^{155}Er	1/2+	
^{156}Tm	69	87	155.938986(15)	1971	83.8(18) s	β^{+} (99.94%)	^{156}Er	2−	
^{156}Tm	69	87	155.938986(15)	1971	83.8(18) s	α (0.064%)	^{152}Ho	2−	
^{156m}Tm	400(200)# keV			1985	~400 ns	IT	^{156}Tm	(11−)	
^{157}Tm	69	88	156.936973(30)	1974	3.63(9) min	β^{+}	^{157}Er	1/2+	
^{157}Tm	69	88	156.936973(30)	1974	3.63(9) min	α (7.5×10^{−4}%)	^{153}Ho	1/2+	
^{157m}Tm	100(50)# keV			(2008)	1.6 s			7/2−#	
^{158}Tm	69	89	157.936980(27)	1970	3.98(6) min	β^{+}	^{158}Er	2−	
^{158m}Tm	100(50)# keV			(1981) (Note: Half-life later corrected to 20 ns, not included in discovery database)	~20 s			5−#	
^{159}Tm	69	90	158.934975(30)	1971	9.13(16) min	β^{+}	^{159}Er	5/2+	
^{160}Tm	69	91	159.935264(35)	1970	9.4(3) min	β^{+}	^{160}Er	1−	
^{160m1}Tm	67(14) keV			1983	74.5(15) s	IT (85%)	^{160}Tm	(5+)	
^{160m1}Tm	67(14) keV			1983	74.5(15) s	β^{+} (15%)	^{160}Er	(5+)	
^{160m2}Tm	215(52)# keV			1986	~200 ns	IT	^{160}Tm	(8)	
^{161}Tm	69	92	160.933549(30)	1959	30.2(8) min	β^{+}	^{161}Er	7/2+	
^{161m1}Tm	7.51(24) keV			(1981) (Note: Half-life shorter than 100ns, not included in discovery database)	5# min			(1/2+)	
^{161m2}Tm	78.20(3) keV			1981	110(3) ns	IT	^{161}Tm	7/2−	
^{162}Tm	69	93	161.934001(28)	1963	21.70(19) min	β^{+}	^{162}Er	1−	
^{162m}Tm	130(40) keV			1974	24.3(17) s	IT (81%)	^{162}Tm	5+	
^{162m}Tm	130(40) keV			1974	24.3(17) s	β^{+} (19%)	^{162}Er	5+	
^{163}Tm	69	94	162.9326583(59)	1959	1.810(5) h	β^{+}	^{163}Er	1/2+	
^{163m}Tm	86.92(5) keV			1975	380(30) ns	IT	^{163}Tm	(7/2)−	
^{164}Tm	69	95	163.933538(27)	1960	2.0(1) min	EC (61%)	^{164}Er	1+	
^{164}Tm	69	95	163.933538(27)	1960	2.0(1) min	β^{+} (39%)	^{164}Er	1+	
^{164m}Tm	20(12) keV			1971	5.1(1) min	IT (~80%)	^{164}Tm	6−	
^{164m}Tm	20(12) keV			1971	5.1(1) min	β^{+} (~20%)	^{164}Er	6−	
^{165}Tm	69	96	164.9324418(18)	1953	30.06(3) h	β^{+}	^{165}Er	1/2+	
^{165m1}Tm	80.37(6) keV			1967	80(3) μs	IT	^{165}Tm	7/2+	
^{165m2}Tm	160.47(6) keV			1968	9.0(5) μs	IT	^{165}Tm	7/2−	
^{166}Tm	69	97	165.933562(12)	1948	7.70(3) h	β^{+}	^{166}Er	2+	
^{166m1}Tm	122(7) keV			1996	348(21) ms	IT	^{166}Tm	(6−)	
^{166m2}Tm	244(7) keV			1996	2(1) μs	IT	^{166}Tm	(6−)	
^{167}Tm	69	98	166.9328572(14)	1948	9.25(2) d	EC	^{167}Er	1/2+	
^{167m1}Tm	179.480(19) keV			1964	1.16(6) μs	IT	^{167}Tm	7/2+	
^{167m2}Tm	292.820(20) keV			1965	0.9(1) μs	IT	^{167}Tm	7/2−	
^{168}Tm	69	99	167.9341785(18)	1949	93.1(2) d	β^{+} (99.99%)	^{168}Er	3+	
^{168}Tm	69	99	167.9341785(18)	1949	93.1(2) d	β^{−} (0.010%)	^{168}Yb	3+	
^{169}Tm	69	100	168.93421896(79)	1934	Observationally Stable (Note: Believed to undergo α decay to ^{165}Ho)			1/2+	1.0000
^{169m}Tm	316.1463(1) keV			1948	659.9(23) ns	IT	^{169}Tm	7/2+	
^{170}Tm	69	101	169.93580709(79)	1936	128.6(3) d	β^{−} (99.87%)	^{170}Yb	1−	
^{170}Tm	69	101	169.93580709(79)	1936	128.6(3) d	EC (0.131%)	^{170}Er	1−	
^{170m}Tm	183.197(4) keV			1967	4.12(13) μs	IT	^{170}Tm	3+	
^{171}Tm	69	102	170.9364352(10)	1948	1.92(1) y	β^{−}	^{171}Yb	1/2+	
^{171m1}Tm	424.9557(15) keV			1948	2.60(2) μs	IT	^{171}Tm	7/2−	
^{171m2}Tm	1674.43(13) keV			2009	1.7(2) μs	IT	^{171}Tm	19/2+	
^{172}Tm	69	103	171.9384070(59)	1956	63.6(3) h	β^{−}	^{172}Yb	2−	
^{172m}Tm	476.2(2) keV			2008	132(7) μs	IT	^{172}Tm	(6+)	
^{173}Tm	69	104	172.9396066(47)	1961	8.24(8) h	β^{−}	^{173}Yb	(1/2+)	
^{173m1}Tm	317.73(20) keV			1972	10.7(17) μs	IT	^{173}Tm	7/2−	
^{173m2}Tm	1905.7(4) keV			2012	250(69) ns	IT	^{173}Tm	19/2−	
^{173m3}Tm	4047.9(5) keV			2012	121(28) ns	IT	^{173}Tm	35/2−	
^{174}Tm	69	105	173.942174(48)	1960	5.4(1) min	β^{−}	^{174}Yb	4−	
^{174m1}Tm	252.4(7) keV			2006	2.29(1) s	IT (>98.5%)	^{174}Tm	0+	
^{174m1}Tm	252.4(7) keV			2006	2.29(1) s	β^{−} (<1.5%)	^{174}Yb	0+	
^{174m2}Tm	2091.7(3) keV			2013	106(7) μs	IT	^{174}Tm	14−	
^{175}Tm	69	106	174.943842(54)	1961	15.2(5) min	β^{−}	^{175}Yb	(1/2)+	
^{175m1}Tm	440.0(11) keV			2012	319(35) ns	IT	^{175}Tm	7/2−	
^{175m2}Tm	1517.7(12) keV			2012	21(14) μs	IT	^{175}Tm	23/2+	
^{176}Tm	69	107	175.94700(11)	1961	1.85(3) min	β^{−}	^{176}Yb	(4+)	
^{177}Tm	69	108	176.94893(22)#	1989	95(7) s	β^{−}	^{177}Yb	1/2+#	
^{177m}Tm	100(100)# keV			1989	77(11) s	β^{−}	^{177}Yb	7/2−#	
^{178}Tm	69	109	177.95251(32)#	2012	10# s [>300 ns]			1−#	
^{179}Tm	69	110	178.95502(43)#	2012	18# s [>300 ns]			1/2+#	
^{180}Tm	69	111	179.95902(43)#	2012	3# s [>300 ns]				
^{181}Tm	69	112	180.96195(54)#	2012	7# s [>300 ns]			1/2+#	
^{182}Tm	69	113	181.96619(54)#	2024					
^{183}Tm	69	114		2024					
^{184}Tm	69	115		2026					
^{185}Tm	69	116		2026					
^{186}Tm	69	117		2026					
This table header & footer:

== Thulium-170 ==
Thulium-170 has a half-life of 128.6 days, decaying by β^{−} decay about 99.87% of the time and electron capture the remaining 0.13% of the time. Due to its low-energy X-ray emissions, it has been proposed for radiotherapy and as a source in a radiothermal generator.

== See also ==
Daughter products other than thulium

- Isotopes of ytterbium
- Isotopes of erbium
- Isotopes of holmium
