= Mattauch isobar rule =

Rule for predicting stability of elements

The Mattauch isobar rule, formulated by Josef Mattauch in 1934, states that if two adjacent elements on the periodic table have isotopes of the same mass number, one of the isotopes must be radioactive. Two nuclides that have the same mass number (isobars) can both be stable only if their atomic numbers differ by more than one. In fact, for currently observationally stable nuclides, the difference can only be 2 or 4, and in theory, two nuclides that have the same mass number cannot be both stable (at least to beta decay or double beta decay), but many such nuclides which are theoretically unstable to double beta decay have not been observed to decay, e.g. ^{134}Xe. However, this rule cannot make predictions on the half-lives of these radioisotopes.

== Technetium and promethium ==
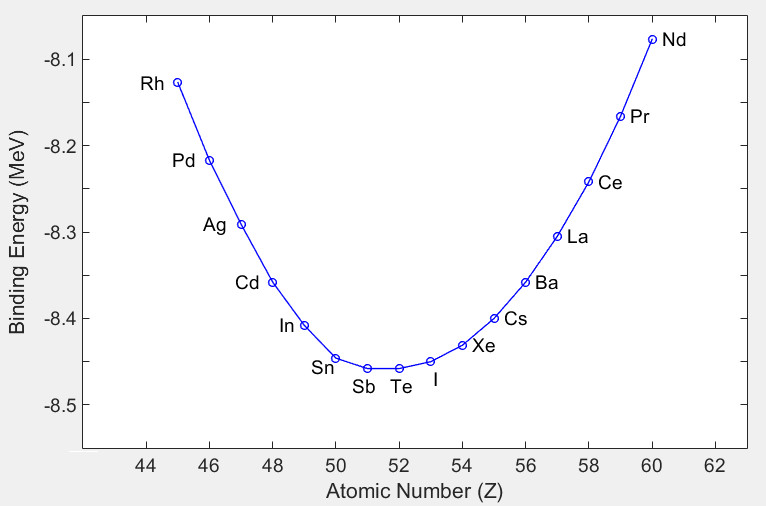
The negative of binding energy per nucleon for nuclides with atomic mass number 125 plotted as a function of atomic number. The profile of binding energy across the valley of stability is roughly a parabola. Tellurium-125 (_{52}Te) is stable, while antimony-125 (_{51}Sb) is unstable to β− decay.

A consequence of this rule is that neither technetium nor promethium have any stable isotopes, as each of the neighboring elements on the periodic table (molybdenum and ruthenium, and neodymium and samarium, respectively) have a beta-stable isotope for each mass number for the range in which the isotopes of the unstable elements usually would be stable to beta decay. Samarium-147 is not a counterexample; although it is unstable to alpha decay, it is stable to beta decay. These ranges can be calculated using the liquid drop model (for example the stability of technetium isotopes), in which the isobar with the lowest mass excess or greatest binding energy is shown to be stable to beta decay because energy conservation forbids a spontaneous transition to a less stable state.

Thus no stable nuclides have proton number 43 or 61, and by the same reasoning no stable nuclides have neutron number 19, 21, 35, 39, 45, 61, 71, 89, 115, or 123.

== Exceptions ==
The only known exceptions to the Mattauch isobar rule are the cases of antimony-123 and tellurium-123 and of hafnium-180 and tantalum-180m, where both nuclei are observationally stable. It is predicted that ^{123}Te should undergo electron capture to form ^{123}Sb, but this decay has not yet been observed; ^{180m}Ta should be able to undergo isomeric transition to ^{180}Ta, beta decay to ^{180}W, electron capture to ^{180}Hf, or alpha decay to ^{176}Lu, but none of these decay modes have been observed.

In addition, beta decay has been seen for neither curium-247 nor berkelium-247, though it is expected that the former should decay into the latter. Both nuclides are alpha-unstable.

As mentioned above, the Mattauch isobar rule cannot make predictions as to the half-lives of the beta-unstable isotopes. Hence there are a few cases where isobars of adjacent elements both occur primordially, as the half-life of the unstable isobar is over a billion years. This occurs for the following mass numbers:

- 40 (^{40}Ar and ^{40}Ca stable; ^{40}K unstable)
- 50 (^{50}Ti and ^{50}Cr stable; ^{50}V unstable)
- 87 (^{87}Sr stable; ^{87}Rb unstable)
- 113 (^{113}In stable; ^{113}Cd unstable)
- 115 (^{115}Sn stable; ^{115}In unstable)
- 138 (^{138}Ba and ^{138}Ce stable; ^{138}La unstable)
- 176 (^{176}Yb and ^{176}Hf stable; ^{176}Lu unstable)
- 187 (^{187}Os stable; ^{187}Re unstable)

== See also ==
- Beta-decay stable isobars
