= Isotone =

Different nuclides with the same neutron number

Nuclide half-lives color-coded. In this chart, horizontal lines represent isotones.

Two nuclides are isotones if they have the same neutron number N, but different proton number Z. For example, boron-12 and carbon-13 nuclei both contain 7 neutrons, and so are isotones. Similarly, ^{36}S, ^{37}Cl, ^{38}Ar, ^{39}K, and ^{40}Ca nuclei are all isotones of 20 because they all contain 20 neutrons. Despite its similarity to the Greek for "same stretching", the term was formed by the German physicist K. Guggenheimer by changing the "p" in "isotope" from "p" for "proton" to "n" for "neutron".

The largest numbers of observationally stable nuclides exist for isotones 50 (five: ^{86}Kr, ^{88}Sr, ^{89}Y, ^{90}Zr, ^{92}Mo – noting also the primordial radionuclide ^{87}Rb) and 82 (six: ^{138}Ba, ^{139}La, ^{140}Ce, ^{141}Pr, ^{142}Nd, ^{144}Sm – noting also the primordial radionuclide ^{136}Xe). Neutron numbers for which there are no stable isotones are 19, 21, 35, 39, 45, 61, 89, 115, 123, and 127 or more (though 21, 142, 143, 146, and perhaps 150 have primordial radionuclides). In contrast, the proton numbers for which there are no stable isotopes are 43, 61, and 83 or more (83, 90, 92, and perhaps 94 have primordial radionuclides). This is related to nuclear magic numbers, the number of nucleons forming complete shells within the nucleus, e.g. 2, 8, 20, 28, 50, 82, and 126. No more than one observationally stable nuclide has the same odd neutron number, except for 1 (^{2}H and ^{3}He), 5 (^{9}Be and ^{10}B), 7 (^{13}C and ^{14}N), 55 (^{97}Mo and ^{99}Ru), and 107 (^{179}Hf and ^{180m}Ta). In contrast, all even neutron numbers from 6 to 124, except 84 and 86, have at least two observationally stable nuclides. Neutron numbers for which there is a stable nuclide and a primordial radionuclide are 27 (^{50}V), 65 (^{113}Cd), 81 (^{138}La), 84 (^{144}Nd), 85 (^{147}Sm), 86 (^{148}Sm), 105 (^{176}Lu), and 126 (^{209}Bi). Neutron numbers for which there are two primordial radionuclides are 88 (^{151}Eu and ^{152}Gd) and 112 (^{187}Re and ^{190}Pt).

The neutron numbers which have only one stable nuclide (compare: monoisotopic element for the proton numbers) are: 0, 2, 3, 4, 9, 11, 13, 15, 17, 23, 25, 27, 29, 31, 33, 37, 41, 43, 47, 49, 51, 53, 57, 59, 63, 65, 67, 69, 71, 73, 75, 77, 79, 81, 83, 84, 85, 86, 87, 91, 93, 95, 97, 99, 101, 103, 105, 109, 111, 113, 117, 119, 121, 125, 126, and the neutron numbers which have only one significant naturally-abundant nuclide (compare: mononuclidic element for the proton numbers) are: 0, 2, 3, 4, 9, 11, 13, 15, 17, 21, 23, 25, 29, 31, 33, 37, 41, 43, 47, 49, 51, 53, 57, 59, 63, 67, 69, 71, 73, 75, 77, 79, 83, 87, 91, 93, 95, 97, 99, 101, 103, 109, 111, 113, 117, 119, 121, 125, 142, 143, 146.

== See also ==
- Isotopes are nuclides having the same number of protons: e.g. carbon-12 and carbon-13.
- Isobars are nuclides having the same mass number (i.e. sum of protons plus neutrons): e.g. carbon-12 and boron-12.
- Nuclear isomers are different excited states of the same type of nucleus. A transition from one isomer to another is accompanied by emission or absorption of a gamma ray, or the process of internal conversion. (Not to be confused with chemical isomers.)
