= Isotopically pure diamond =

An isotopically pure diamond is a type of diamond that is composed entirely of one isotope of carbon. Isotopically pure diamonds have been manufactured from either the more common carbon isotope with mass number 12 (abbreviated as ^{12}C) or the less common ^{13}C isotope. Compared to natural diamonds that are composed of a mixture of ^{12}C and ^{13}C isotopes, isotopically pure diamonds possess improved characteristics such as increased thermal conductivity. Thermal conductivity of diamonds is at a minimum when ^{12}C and ^{13}C are in a ratio of 1:1 and reaches a maximum when the composition is 100% ^{12}C or 100% ^{13}C.

== Manufacture ==
This starts with isotopically enriched methane (see carbon-13#Production for methods of enrichment). This can be converted through graphite to isotopically pure synthetic diamonds. Isotopically enriched diamonds have been synthesized by application of chemical vapor deposition followed by high pressure.

== Types ==
=== Carbon-12 ===
Isotopically pure (in practice depleted about 15-fold in ^{13}C) ^{12}C diamond has a 50% higher thermal conductivity than the already high value of 900-2000 W/(m·K) for normal diamond having the natural isotopic composition of 98.9% ^{12}C and 1.1% ^{13}C. This is useful for heat sinks for the semiconductor industry.

=== Carbon-13 ===
Isotopically pure ^{13}C diamond layers 20 micrometers thick are used as stress sensors due to the advantageous Raman spectroscopy properties of ^{13}C.
