= Nuclide =

Atomic species

Nuclides (or nucleides, from nucleus; also known as nuclear species) are a class of atoms characterized by their number of protons, Z, their number of neutrons, N, and their nuclear energy state.

The word nuclide was coined by the American nuclear physicist Truman P. Kohman in 1947. Kohman defined nuclide as a "species of atom characterized by the constitution of its nucleus" containing a certain number of neutrons and protons. The term thus originally focused on the nucleus.

== Nuclide vs. isotope ==
A nuclide is an atom with a specific number of protons and neutrons in its nucleus, for example carbon-13 (^{13}_{6}C) with 6 protons and 7 neutrons. The term was coined deliberately in distinction from isotope in order to consider the nuclear properties independently of the chemical properties, though isotope is still used for that purpose especially where nuclide might be unfamiliar as in nuclear technology and nuclear medicine. For nuclear properties, the number of neutrons can be practically as important as that of protons, as is never the case for chemical properties: even in the case of the very lightest elements, where the ratio of neutron number to atomic number varies the most between isotopes, it is a relatively small effect, and only substantial for hydrogen and helium (the latter of which has no chemistry proper). For hydrogen the isotope effect is large enough to affect biological systems strongly. In helium, ^{4}_{2}He obeys Bose–Einstein statistics, while ^{3}_{2}He obeys Fermi–Dirac statistics, which is responsible for sharp differences in physical properties at low temperature.

== Types of nuclides ==
Although the words nuclide and isotope are often used interchangeably, being isotopes is actually only one relation between nuclides. The following table names some other relations.

Designation	Characteristics	Example	Remarks
Isotopes	equal proton number (Z_{1} = Z_{2})	^{12}_{6}C, ^{13}_{6}C, ^{14}_{6}C	see neutron capture
Isotones	equal neutron number (N_{1} = N_{2})	^{13}_{6}C, ^{14}_{7}N, ^{15}_{8}O	see proton capture
Isobars	equal mass number (Z_{1} + N_{1} = Z_{2} + N_{2})	^{17}_{7}N, ^{17}_{8}O, ^{17}_{9}F	see beta decay
Isodiaphers	equal neutron excess (N_{1} − Z_{1} = N_{2} − Z_{2})	^{13}_{6}C, ^{15}_{7}N, ^{17}_{8}O	Examples are isodiaphers with neutron excess 1. A nuclide and its alpha decay product are isodiaphers.
Mirror nuclei	neutron and proton number exchanged (Z_{1} = N_{2} and Z_{2} = N_{1})	^{3}_{1}H, ^{3}_{2}He	see positron emission
Nuclear isomers	same proton number and mass number, but with different energy states	^{99}_{43}Tc, ^{99m}_{43}Tc	m = metastable (long-lived excited state)

A set of nuclides with equal proton number (atomic number), i.e., of the same chemical element but different neutron numbers, are called isotopes of the element. Particular nuclides are still often loosely called "isotopes", but the term "nuclide" is now considered the correct one in the general case when no specific element (Z value) encompasses them. In similar manner, a set of nuclides with equal mass number A, but different atomic number, are called isobars (isobar = equal in weight), and isotones are nuclides of equal neutron number but different proton numbers. Likewise, nuclides with the same neutron excess (N − Z) are called isodiaphers. The name isotone was derived from the name isotope to emphasize that in the first group of nuclides it is the number of neutrons (n) that is constant, whereas in the second the number of protons (p).

See Isotope#Notation for an explanation of the notation used for different nuclide or isotope types.

Nuclear isomers are members of a set of nuclides with equal proton number and equal mass number (thus making them by definition the same isotope), but different states of excitation. An example is the two states of the single isotope ^{99}_{43}Tc shown among the decay schemes. Each of these two states (technetium-99m and technetium-99) qualifies as a different nuclide, illustrating one way that nuclides may differ from isotopes (an isotope may consist of several different nuclides of different excitation states).

The longest-lived non-ground state nuclear isomer is the nuclide tantalum-180m (^{180m}_{73}Ta), which has a half-life in excess of 10^{17} years. This nuclide occurs primordially, and has never been observed to decay to the ground state. (In contrast, the ground state nuclide tantalum-180 does not occur primordially, since it decays with a half-life of only 8 hours to ^{180}_{72}Hf (86%) or ^{180}_{74}W (14%).)

There are 251 nuclides in nature that have never been observed to decay. They occur among the 80 different elements that have one or more stable isotopes. See stable nuclide and primordial nuclide. Unstable nuclides are radioactive and are called radionuclides. Their decay products ('daughter' products) are called radiogenic nuclides.

== Origins of naturally occurring radionuclides ==
Natural radionuclides may be conveniently subdivided into three types.

1. Those whose half-lives exceed a few percent of the age of the Earth (about 4.6×10^{9} years) survive from its formation and are remnants of nucleosynthesis that occurred in stars before the formation of the Solar System. For example, the isotope ^{238}_{92}U (t_{1/2} = 4.463×10^{9} years) of uranium is still fairly abundant in nature, but the shorter-lived isotope ^{235}_{92}U (t_{1/2} = 0.704×10^{9} years) is now 138 times rarer. 35 of these primordial radionuclides have been identified (see List of nuclides and Primordial nuclide for details).
2. Radiogenic nuclides (such as ^{226}_{88}Ra (t_{1/2} = 1600 years), an isotope of radium) that are formed by radioactive decay. They occur in the decay chains of primordial isotopes of uranium or thorium. Some of these nuclides are very short-lived, such as isotopes of francium. There exist about 50 of these daughter nuclides that have half-lives too short to be primordial, and which exist in nature solely due to decay from longer lived radioactive primordial nuclides.
3. Nuclides that are continuously being made in another fashion that is not simple spontaneous radioactive decay (i.e., only one atom involved with no incoming particle) but instead involves a natural nuclear reaction. These occur when atoms react with natural neutrons (from cosmic rays, spontaneous fission, or other sources), or are bombarded directly with cosmic rays. The latter, if non-primordial, are called cosmogenic nuclides.

Other types of natural nuclear reactions produce nuclides that are said to be nucleogenic nuclides. Nuclides produced as direct products of spontaneous fission span a wide range, but every one will quickly (in geologic time) decay either to a primordial nuclide or one of the seven long-lived fission products, which are thus present in nature, but might be considered either radiogenic or nucleogenic.

Examples of nuclides made by nuclear reactions are cosmogenic ^{14}_{6}C (radiocarbon) that is made by cosmic ray bombardment of other elements and nucleogenic ^{239}_{94}Pu still being created by neutron bombardment of natural ^{238}_{92}U as a result of natural fission in uranium ores.

== Summary table for each class of nuclides ==
This is a summary table for the 987 nuclides with half-lives longer than one hour, given in List of nuclides. Note that that number, while exact to present knowledge, will likely change slightly in the future, as some "stable" nuclides are observed to be radioactive with very long half-lives, and some half-lives or known radioactive ones are revised.

Stability class	Number of nuclides	Running total	Notes on running total
Theoretically stable to all but proton decay	90	90	Includes first 40 elements. Proton decay yet to be observed.
Energetically unstable to one or more known decay modes, but no decay yet seen. Spontaneous fission possible for "stable" nuclides from niobium-93 onward; other mechanisms possible for heavier nuclides. All considered "stable" until decay detected.	161	251	Total of classically stable nuclides.
Radioactive primordial nuclides.	35	286	Total primordial elements include bismuth, thorium, and uranium, as well as all those with stable nuclides.
Radioactive (half-life > 1 hour). Includes most useful radioactive tracers.	701	987	Carbon-14 (and other cosmogenic nuclides generated by cosmic rays), daughters of radioactive primordials, nucleogenic nuclides from natural nuclear reactions that are other than those from cosmic rays (such as neutron absorption from spontaneous nuclear fission or neutron emission), and many synthetic nuclides.
Radioactive synthetic (half-life < 1 hour).	> 4000	> 5000	Includes all other characterized synthetic nuclides.

== Nuclear properties and stability ==
The main discussion of this topic is at Isotope#Nuclear properties and stability.

Stability of nuclides by (Z, N), an example of a table of nuclides: Black – stable (all are primordial) Red – primordial radioactive Other – radioactive, with decreasing stability from orange to white

Atomic nuclei other than ^{1}_{1}H, a lone proton, consist of protons and neutrons bound together by the residual strong force, overcoming electrical repulsion between protons, and for that reason neutrons are required by bind protons together; as the number of protons increases, so does the ratio of neutrons to protons necessary for stability, as the graph illustrates. For example, although light elements up through calcium have stable nuclides with the same number of neutrons as protons, lead requires about 3 neutrons for 2 protons.

== See also ==
- Isotope
- List of elements by stability of isotopes
- List of nuclides (sorted by half-life)
- Table of nuclides
- Alpha nuclide
- Monoisotopic element
- Mononuclidic element
- Primordial element
- Radionuclide
- Hypernucleus
