= Isotopes of hafnium =

Isotopes of hafnium (_{72}Hf)
Main isotopes			Decay	
Isotope	abundance	half-life (t_{1/2})	mode	product
^{172}Hf	synth	1.87 y	ε	^{172}Lu
^{174}Hf	0.16%	3.8×10^{16} y	α	^{170}Yb
^{175}Hf	synth	69.90 d	ε	^{175}Lu
^{176}Hf	5.26%	stable		
^{177}Hf	18.6%	stable		
^{178}Hf	27.3%	stable		
^{178m2}Hf	synth	31 y	IT	^{178}Hf
^{179}Hf	13.6%	stable		
^{180}Hf	35.1%	stable		
^{181}Hf	synth	42.39 d	β^{−}	^{181}Ta
^{182}Hf	synth	8.90×10^{6} y	β^{−}	^{182}Ta

Standard atomic weight A_{r}°(Hf)
- 178.486±0.006; 178.49±0.01 (abridged)

Natural hafnium (_{72}Hf) consists of five observationally stable isotopes (^{176}Hf, ^{177}Hf, ^{178}Hf, ^{179}Hf, and ^{180}Hf) and one very long-lived radioisotope, ^{174}Hf, with a half-life of 3.8×10^{16} years. The next most stable radioisotope is ^{182}Hf with a half-life of 8.90 million years, an extinct radionuclide used in hafnium–tungsten dating to study the chronology of planetary differentiation.

Other isotopes have been synthesized running from ^{153}Hf to ^{192}Hf, but none of the 33 others has a half-life over 1.87 years, and most have half-lives under five minutes. There are also at least 41 nuclear isomers, the most stable of which is ^{178m2}Hf with a half-life of 31 years. All isotopes of hafnium are either radioactive or observationally stable, meaning that they are predicted to be radioactive but no actual decay has been observed.

== List of isotopes ==
Nuclide (Note: ^{m}Hf – Excited nuclear isomer.)	Z	N	Isotopic mass (Da) (Note: ( ) – Uncertainty (1σ) is given in concise form in parentheses after the corresponding last digits.) (Note: # – Atomic mass marked #: value and uncertainty derived not from purely experimental data, but at least partly from trends from the Mass Surface (TMS).)	Discovery year	Half-life (Note: Bold half-life – nearly stable, half-life longer than age of universe.) (Note: # – Values marked # are not purely derived from experimental data, but at least partly from trends of neighboring nuclides (TNN).)	Decay mode (Note: Modes of decay: EC: / Electron capture; IT: / Isomeric transition)	Daughter isotope (Note: Bold symbol as daughter – Daughter product is stable.)	Spin and parity (Note: ( ) spin value – Indicates spin with weak assignment arguments.)	Natural abundance (mole fraction)	
Nuclide	Excitation energy			Discovery year	Half-life	Decay mode	Daughter isotope	Spin and parity	Normal proportion	Range of variation
^{152}Hf	72	80		2026						
^{153}Hf	72	81	152.970692(322)#	2026	400# ms [>200 ns]	β^{+}?	^{153}Lu	1/2+#		
^{154}Hf	72	82	153.96486(32)#	1981	2(1) s	β^{+}	^{154}Lu	0+		
^{154}Hf	72	82	153.96486(32)#	1981	2(1) s	α (rare)	^{150}Yb	0+		
^{154m}Hf	2721(50)# keV			1989	9(4) μs	IT	^{154}Hf	(10+)		
^{155}Hf	72	83	154.96317(32)#	1981	843(30) ms	β^{+}	^{155}Lu	7/2−#		
^{155m}Hf	2.5815(10) keV			2024	510(30) ns	IT	^{155}Hf	27/2-#		
^{156}Hf	72	84	155.95940(16)	1979	23(1) ms	α	^{152}Yb	0+		
^{156m}Hf	1958.8(10) keV			1989	480(40) μs	α	^{152}Yb	(8+)		
^{157}Hf	72	85	156.95829(22)#	1965	115(1) ms	α (94%)	^{153}Yb	7/2−		
^{157}Hf	72	85	156.95829(22)#	1965	115(1) ms	β^{+} (6%)	^{157}Lu	7/2−		
^{158}Hf	72	86	157.954801(19)	1965	2.85(7) s	β^{+} (55.7%)	^{158}Lu	0+		
^{158}Hf	72	86	157.954801(19)	1965	2.85(7) s	α (44.3%)	^{154}Yb	0+		
^{159}Hf	72	87	158.953996(18)	1973	5.20(10) s	β^{+} (65%)	^{159}Lu	7/2−		
^{159}Hf	72	87	158.953996(18)	1973	5.20(10) s	α (35%)	^{155}Yb	7/2−		
^{160}Hf	72	88	159.950683(10)	1973	13.6(2) s	β^{+} (99.3%)	^{160}Lu	0+		
^{160}Hf	72	88	159.950683(10)	1973	13.6(2) s	α (0.7%)	^{156}Yb	0+		
^{161}Hf	72	89	160.950278(25)	1973	18.4(4) s	β^{+} (99.71%)	^{161}Lu	(7/2−)		
^{161}Hf	72	89	160.950278(25)	1973	18.4(4) s	α (0.29%)	^{157}Yb	(7/2−)		
^{161m}Hf	329.0(5) keV			2014	4.8(2) μs	IT	^{161}Hf	(13/2+)		
^{162}Hf	72	90	161.9472155(96)	1982	39.4(9) s	β^{+} (99.99%)	^{162}Lu	0+		
^{162}Hf	72	90	161.9472155(96)	1982	39.4(9) s	α (0.008%)	^{158}Yb	0+		
^{163}Hf	72	91	162.947107(28)	1982	40.0(6) s	β^{+}	^{163}Lu	(5/2−)		
^{164}Hf	72	92	163.944371(17)	1981	111(8) s	β^{+}	^{164}Lu	0+		
^{165}Hf	72	93	164.944567(30)	1981	76(4) s	β^{+}	^{165}Lu	(5/2−)		
^{166}Hf	72	94	165.942180(30)	1965	6.77(30) min	β^{+}	^{166}Lu	0+		
^{167}Hf	72	95	166.942600(30)	1969	2.05(5) min	β^{+}	^{167}Lu	(5/2)−		
^{168}Hf	72	96	167.940568(30)	1961	25.95(20) min	EC (98%)	^{168}Lu	0+		
^{168}Hf	72	96	167.940568(30)	1961	25.95(20) min	β^{+} (2%)	^{168}Lu	0+		
^{169}Hf	72	97	168.941259(30)	1969	3.24(4) min	β^{+}	^{169}Lu	(5/2−)		
^{170}Hf	72	98	169.939609(30)	1961	16.01(13) h	EC	^{170}Lu	0+		
^{171}Hf	72	99	170.940492(31)	1951	12.1(4) h	β^{+}	^{171}Lu	7/2+		
^{171m}Hf	21.93(9) keV			1997	29.5(9) s	IT	^{171}Hf	1/2−		
^{172}Hf	72	100	171.939450(26)	1951	1.87(3) y	EC	^{172}Lu	0+		
^{172m}Hf	2005.84(11) keV			1977	163(3) ns	IT	^{172}Hf	(8−)		
^{173}Hf	72	101	172.940513(30)	1951	23.6(1) h	β^{+}	^{173}Lu	1/2−		
^{173m1}Hf	107.16(5) keV			1973	180(8) ns	IT	^{173}Hf	5/2−		
^{173m2}Hf	197.47(10) keV			1973	160(40) ns	IT	^{173}Hf	7/2+		
^{174}Hf (Note: primordial radionuclide)	72	102	173.9400484(24)	1939	3.8+1.7 −0.9×10^{16} y	α (Note: Theorized to also undergo β^{+}β^{+} decay to ^{174}Yb)	^{170}Yb	0+	0.0016(12)	
^{174m1}Hf	1549.26(4) keV			1973	138(4) ns	IT	^{174}Hf	6+		
^{174m2}Hf	1797.59(7) keV			1990	2.39(4) μs	IT	^{174}Hf	8−		
^{174m3}Hf	3312.07(6) keV			1990	3.7(2) μs	IT	^{174}Hf	14+		
^{175}Hf	72	103	174.9415114(25)	1949	69.90(7) d	EC	^{175}Lu	5/2−		
^{175m1}Hf	125.89(12) keV			1964	53.7(15) μs	IT	^{175}Hf	1/2−		
^{175m2}Hf	1433.41(12) keV			1980	1.10(8) μs	IT	^{175}Hf	19/2+		
^{175m3}Hf	3015.6(4) keV			1980	1.21(15) μs	IT	^{175}Hf	35/2−		
^{175m4}Hf	4636.2(12) keV			1990	1.9(1) μs	IT	^{175}Hf	45/2+		
^{176}Hf (Note: Used in lutetium-hafnium dating)	72	104	175.9414098(16)	1934	Observationally Stable (Note: Believed to undergo α decay to ^{172}Yb)			0+	0.0526(70)	
^{176m1}Hf	1333.07(7) keV			1964	9.6(3) μs	IT	^{176}Hf	6+		
^{176m2}Hf	1559.31(9) keV			1967	9.9(2) μs	IT	^{176}Hf	8−		
^{176m3}Hf	2865.8(7) keV			1975	401(6) μs	IT	^{176}Hf	14−		
^{176m4}Hf	4863.6(9) keV			1976	43(4) μs	IT	^{176}Hf	22−		
^{177}Hf	72	105	176.9432302(15)	1934	Observationally Stable (Note: Believed to undergo α decay to ^{173}Yb with a half-life over 1.3×10^{18} y.)			7/2−	0.1860(16)	
^{177m1}Hf	1315.4502(8) keV			1966	1.09(5) s	IT	^{177}Hf	23/2+		
^{177m2}Hf	1342.4(10) keV			1998	55.9(12) μs	IT	^{177}Hf	(19/2−)		
^{177m3}Hf	2740.02(15) keV			1971	51.4(5) min	IT	^{177}Hf	37/2−		
^{178}Hf	72	106	177.9437083(15)	1934	Observationally Stable (Note: Believed to undergo α decay to ^{174}Yb)			0+	0.2728(28)	
^{178m1}Hf	1147.416(6) keV			1958	4.0(2) s	IT	^{178}Hf	8−		
^{178m2}Hf	2446.09(8) keV			1968	31(1) y	IT	^{178}Hf	16+		
^{178m3}Hf	2572.4(3) keV			1977	68(2) μs	IT	^{178}Hf	14−		
^{179}Hf	72	107	178.9458257(15)	1934	Observationally Stable (Note: Believed to undergo α decay to ^{175}Yb)			9/2+	0.1362(11)	
^{179m1}Hf	375.0352(25) keV			1951	18.67(4) s	IT	^{179}Hf	1/2−		
^{179m2}Hf	1106.412(33) keV			1970	25.00(17) d	IT	^{179}Hf	25/2−		
^{179m3}Hf	3775.2(21) keV			2000	15(5) μs	IT	^{179}Hf	(43/2+)		
^{180}Hf	72	108	179.9465595(15)	1934	Observationally Stable (Note: Believed to undergo α decay to ^{176}Yb)			0+	0.3508(33)	
^{180m1}Hf	1141.552(15) keV			1951	5.53(2) h	IT (99.69%)	^{180}Hf	8−		
^{180m1}Hf	1141.552(15) keV			1951	5.53(2) h	β^{−} (0.31%)	^{180m1}Ta	8−		
^{180m2}Hf	1374.36(4) keV			2016	570(20) ns	IT	^{180}Hf	4−		
^{180m3}Hf	2485.5(5) keV			2016	0.94(11) μs	IT	^{180}Hf	12+		
^{180m4}Hf	3599.0(10) keV			1999	90(10) μs	IT	^{180}Hf	(18−)		
^{181}Hf	72	109	180.9491108(15)	1935	42.39(6) d	β^{−}	^{181}Ta	1/2−		
^{181m1}Hf	595.27(4) keV			1999	80(5) μs	IT	^{181}Hf	(9/2+)		
^{181m2}Hf	1043.5(8) keV			2001	~100 μs	IT	^{181}Hf	(17/2+)		
^{181m3}Hf	1741.9(13) keV			2001	1.5(5) ms	IT	^{181}Hf	(25/2−)		
^{182}Hf (Note: Extinct radionuclide, used in hafnium–tungsten dating)	72	110	181.9505637(66)	1961	8.90(9)×10^{6} y	β^{−}	^{182}Ta	0+		
^{182m1}Hf	1172.87(18) keV			1971	61.5(15) min	β^{−} (54%)	^{182}Ta	8−		
^{182m1}Hf	1172.87(18) keV			1971	61.5(15) min	IT (46%)	^{182}Hf	8−		
^{182m2}Hf	2571.3(12) keV			1999	40(10) μs	IT	^{182}Hf	(13+)		
^{183}Hf	72	111	182.953533(32)	1956	1.018(2) h	β^{−}	^{183}Ta	(3/2−)		
^{183m}Hf	1464(64) keV			2010	40(30) s	IT	^{183}Hf	27/2−#		
^{184}Hf	72	112	183.955449(43)	1973	4.12(5) h	β^{−}	^{184}Ta	0+		
^{184m1}Hf	1272.2(4) keV			1995	48(10) s	IT	^{184}Hf	8−		
^{184m2}Hf	2477(10) keV			2010	16(7) min			15+#		
^{185}Hf	72	113	184.958862(69)	1993	3.5(6) min	β^{−}	^{185}Ta	(9/2−)		
^{186}Hf	72	114	185.960897(55)	1998	2.6(12) min	β^{−}	^{186}Ta	0+		
^{186m}Hf	2968(43) keV			2010	>20 s			17+#		
^{187}Hf	72	115	186.96457(22)#	1999	14# s [>300 ns]			9/2−#		
^{187m}Hf	500(300)# keV			2009	270(80) ns	IT	^{187}Hf	3/2−#		
^{188}Hf	72	116	187.96690(32)#	1999	7# s [>300 ns]			0+		
^{189}Hf	72	117	188.97085(32)#	2009	400# ms [>300 ns]			3/2−#		
^{190}Hf	72	118	189.97338(43)#	2012	600# ms [>300 ns]			0+		
^{191}Hf	72	119		2023						
^{192}Hf	72	120		2023				0+		
^{193}Hf	72	121		2026						
^{194}Hf	72	122		2026						
This table header & footer:

== See also ==
Daughter products other than hafnium

- Isotopes of tantalum
- Isotopes of lutetium
- Isotopes of ytterbium
