= Isotopes of tantalum =

Isotopes of tantalum (_{73}Ta)
Main isotopes			Decay	
Isotope	abundance	half-life (t_{1/2})	mode	product
^{177}Ta	synth	56.36 h	β^{+}	^{177}Hf
^{178}Ta	synth	2.36 h	β^{+}	^{178}Hf
^{179}Ta	synth	1.82 y	ε	^{179}Hf
^{180}Ta	synth	8.154 h	ε	^{180}Hf
^{180}Ta	synth	8.154 h	β^{−}	^{180}W
^{180m}Ta	0.0120%	observ. stable		
^{181}Ta	99.988%	stable		
^{182}Ta	synth	114.74 d	β^{−}	^{182}W
^{183}Ta	synth	5.1 d	β^{−}	^{183}W

Standard atomic weight A_{r}°(Ta)
- 180.94788±0.00002; 180.95±0.01 (abridged)

Natural tantalum (_{73}Ta) consists of two isotopes: observationally stable ^{181}Ta (99.988%) and ^{180m}Ta (0.012%).

There are also 35 known artificial radioisotopes, the longest-lived of which are ^{179}Ta with a half-life of 1.82 years, ^{182}Ta with a half-life of 114.74 days, ^{183}Ta with a half-life of 5.1 days, and ^{177}Ta with a half-life of 56.46 hours. All other isotopes have half-lives under a day, most under an hour. There are also numerous isomers, the most stable of which (other than ^{180m}Ta) is ^{182m2}Ta with a half-life of 15.8 minutes. All isotopes and nuclear isomers of tantalum are either radioactive or observationally stable, meaning that they are predicted to be radioactive but no actual decay has been observed.

Tantalum has been proposed as a "salting" material for nuclear weapons (cobalt is another, better-known salting material). A jacket of tantalum, irradiated by the intense high-energy neutron flux of the weapon, would be transmuted into the radioactive isotope ^{182}Ta, producing about 1.12 MeV of gamma radiation per decay and significantly increasing the radioactivity of the weapon's fallout for months. Such a weapon is not known to have ever been built, tested, or used.

== List of isotopes ==
Nuclide (Note: ^{m}Ta – Excited nuclear isomer.)	Z	N	Isotopic mass (Da) (Note: ( ) – Uncertainty (1σ) is given in concise form in parentheses after the corresponding last digits.) (Note: # – Atomic mass marked #: value and uncertainty derived not from purely experimental data, but at least partly from trends from the Mass Surface (TMS).)	Discovery year	Half-life (Note: # – Values marked # are not purely derived from experimental data, but at least partly from trends of neighboring nuclides (TNN).)	Decay mode (Note: Modes of decay: EC: / Electron capture; IT: / Isomeric transition; p: / Proton emission)	Daughter isotope (Note: Bold italics symbol as daughter – Daughter product is nearly stable.) (Note: Bold symbol as daughter – Daughter product is stable.)	Spin and parity (Note: ( ) spin value – Indicates spin with weak assignment arguments.)	Natural abundance (mole fraction)	
Nuclide	Excitation energy			Discovery year	Half-life	Decay mode	Daughter isotope	Spin and parity	Normal proportion	Range of variation
^{154}Ta	73	81		2026						
^{155}Ta	73	82	154.97425(32)#	2007	3.2(13) ms	p	^{154}Hf	11/2−		
^{156}Ta	73	83	155.97209(32)#	1992	106(4) ms	p (71%)	^{155}Hf	(2−)		
^{156}Ta	73	83	155.97209(32)#	1992	106(4) ms	β^{+} (29%)	^{156}Hf	(2−)		
^{156m}Ta	94(8) keV			1993	360(40) ms	β^{+} (95.8%)	^{156}Hf	(9+)		
^{156m}Ta	94(8) keV			1993	360(40) ms	p (4.2%)	^{155}Hf	(9+)		
^{157}Ta	73	84	156.96823(16)	1979	10.1(4) ms	α (96.6%)	^{153}Lu	1/2+		
^{157}Ta	73	84	156.96823(16)	1979	10.1(4) ms	p (3.4%)	^{156}Hf	1/2+		
^{157m1}Ta	22(5) keV			1979	4.3(1) ms	α	^{153}Lu	11/2−		
^{157m2}Ta	1593(9) keV			1996	1.7(1) ms	α	^{153}Lu	25/2−#		
^{158}Ta	73	85	157.96659(22)#	1979	49(4) ms	α	^{154}Lu	(2)−		
^{158m1}Ta	141(11) keV			1996	36.0(8) ms	α (95%)	^{154}Lu	(9)+		
^{158m2}Ta	2808(16) keV			2014	6.1(1) μs	IT (98.6%)	^{158}Ta	(19−)		
^{158m2}Ta	2808(16) keV			2014	6.1(1) μs	α (1.4%)	^{154}Lu	(19−)		
^{159}Ta	73	86	158.963028(21)	1979	1.04(9) s	β^{+} (66%)	^{159}Hf	1/2+		
^{159}Ta	73	86	158.963028(21)	1979	1.04(9) s	α (34%)	^{155}Lu	1/2+		
^{159m}Ta	64(5) keV			1979	560(60) ms	α (55%)	^{155}Lu	11/2−		
^{159m}Ta	64(5) keV			1979	560(60) ms	β^{+} (45%)	^{159}Hf	11/2−		
^{160}Ta	73	87	159.961542(58)	1979	1.70(20) s	α	^{156}Lu	(2)−		
^{160m}Ta (Note: Order of ground state and isomer is uncertain.)	110(250) keV			1996	1.55(4) s	α	^{156}Lu	(9,10)+		
^{161}Ta	73	88	160.958369(26)	1979	3# s			(1/2+)		
^{161m}Ta	61(23) keV			(2005) (Note: Only evidence for a different state from the ground state was reported in a conference proceeding, not included in the discovery data base.)	3.08(11) s	β^{+} (93%)	^{161}Hf	(11/2−)		
^{161m}Ta	61(23) keV			(2005)	3.08(11) s	α (7%)	^{157}Lu	(11/2−)		
^{162}Ta	73	89	161.957293(68)	1985	3.57(12) s	β^{+} (99.93%)	^{162}Hf	3−#		
^{162}Ta	73	89	161.957293(68)	1985	3.57(12) s	α (0.074%)	^{158}Lu	3−#		
^{162m}Ta	120(50)# keV			(1974) (Note: Half-life not measured, not included in discovery database)	5# s			7+#		
^{163}Ta	73	90	162.954337(41)	1985	10.6(18) s	β^{+} (99.8%)	^{163}Hf	1/2+		
^{163m}Ta	138(18)# keV			(1992)	10# s			9/2−		
^{164}Ta	73	91	163.953534(30)	1982	14.2(3) s	β^{+}	^{164}Hf	(3+)		
^{165}Ta	73	92	164.950780(15)	1982	31.0(15) s	β^{+}	^{165}Hf	(1/2+,3/2+)		
^{165m}Ta	24(18) keV			(1992)	30# s			(9/2−)		
^{166}Ta	73	93	165.950512(30)	1977	34.4(5) s	β^{+}	^{166}Hf	(2)+		
^{167}Ta	73	94	166.948093(30)	1982	1.33(7) min	β^{+}	^{167}Hf	(3/2+)		
^{168}Ta	73	95	167.948047(30)	1969	2.0(1) min	β^{+}	^{168}Hf	(3+)		
^{169}Ta	73	96	168.946011(30)	1969	4.9(4) min	β^{+}	^{169}Hf	(5/2+)		
^{170}Ta	73	97	169.946175(30)	1969	6.76(6) min	β^{+}	^{170}Hf	(3+)		
^{171}Ta	73	98	170.944476(30)	1969	23.3(3) min	β^{+}	^{171}Hf	(5/2+)		
^{172}Ta	73	99	171.944895(30)	1964	36.8(3) min	β^{+}	^{172}Hf	(3+)		
^{173}Ta	73	100	172.943750(30)	1960	3.14(13) h	β^{+}	^{173}Hf	5/2−		
^{173m1}Ta	173.10(21) keV			1977	205.2(56) ns	IT	^{173}Ta	9/2−		
^{173m2}Ta	1717.2(4) keV			1977	132(3) ns	IT	^{173}Ta	21/2−		
^{174}Ta	73	101	173.944454(30)	1960	1.14(8) h	β^{+}	^{174}Hf	3+		
^{175}Ta	73	102	174.943737(30)	1960	10.5(2) h	β^{+}	^{175}Hf	7/2+		
^{175m1}Ta	131.41(17) keV			1972	222(8) ns	IT	^{175}Ta	9/2−		
^{175m2}Ta	339.2(13) keV			(1969) (Note: Only published in a conference proceeding and not a refereed journal)	170(20) ns	IT	^{175}Ta	(1/2+)		
^{175m3}Ta	1567.6(3) keV			1972	1.95(15) μs	IT	^{175}Ta	21/2−		
^{176}Ta	73	103	175.944857(33)	1948	8.09(5) h	β^{+}	^{176}Hf	(1)−		
^{176m1}Ta	103.0(10) keV			1971	1.08(7) ms	IT	^{176}Ta	7+		
^{176m2}Ta	1474.0(14) keV			1978	3.8(4) μs	IT	^{176}Ta	14−		
^{176m3}Ta	2874.0(14) keV			1994	0.97(7) ms	IT	^{176}Ta	20−		
^{177}Ta	73	104	176.9444819(36)	1948	56.36(13) h	β^{+}	^{177}Hf	7/2+		
^{177m1}Ta	73.16(7) keV			1973	410(7) ns	IT	^{177}Ta	9/2−		
^{177m2}Ta	186.16(6) keV			1970	3.62(10) μs	IT	^{177}Ta	5/2−		
^{177m3}Ta	1354.8(3) keV			1970	5.30(11) μs	IT	^{177}Ta	21/2−		
^{177m4}Ta	4656.3(8) keV			1994	133(4) μs	IT	^{177}Ta	49/2−		
^{178}Ta	73	105	177.945680(56)#	1950	2.36(8) h	β^{+}	^{178}Hf	7−		
^{178m1}Ta	100(50)# keV			1950	9.31(3) min	β^{+}	^{178}Hf	(1+)		
^{178m2}Ta	1467.82(16) keV			1979	59(3) ms	IT	^{178}Ta	15−		
^{178m3}Ta	2901.9(7) keV			1996	290(12) ms	IT	^{178}Ta	21−		
^{179}Ta	73	106	178.9459391(16)	1950	1.82(3) y	EC	^{179}Hf	7/2+		
^{179m1}Ta	30.7(1) keV			1964	1.42(8) μs	IT	^{179}Ta	9/2−		
^{179m2}Ta	520.23(18) keV			1974	280(80) ns	IT	^{179}Ta	1/2+		
^{179m3}Ta	1252.60(23) keV			1982	322(16) ns	IT	^{179}Ta	21/2−		
^{179m4}Ta	1317.2(4) keV			1982	9.0(2) ms	IT	^{179}Ta	25/2+		
^{179m5}Ta	1328.0(4) keV			1982	1.6(4) μs	IT	^{179}Ta	23/2−		
^{179m6}Ta	2639.3(5) keV			1982	54.1(17) ms	IT	^{179}Ta	37/2+		
^{180}Ta	73	107	179.9474676(22)	1938	8.154(6) h	EC (85%)	^{180}Hf	1+		
^{180}Ta	73	107	179.9474676(22)	1938	8.154(6) h	β^{−} (15%)	^{180}W	1+		
^{180m1}Ta	75.3(14) keV			1955	Observationally stable (Note: Only known observationally stable nuclear isomer, believed to decay by isomeric transition to ^{180}Ta, β^{−} decay to ^{180}W, or electron capture to ^{180}Hf with a half-life over 2.9×10^{17} years; also theorized to undergo α decay to ^{176}Lu) (Note: One of the few (observationally) stable odd-odd nuclei)			9−	1.201(32)×10^{−4}	
^{180m2}Ta	1452.39(22) keV			1996	31.2(14) μs	IT	^{180m1}Ta	15−		
^{180m3}Ta	3678.9(10) keV			2000	2.0(5) μs	IT	^{180m1}Ta	(22−)		
^{180m4}Ta	4172.2(16) keV			2000	17(5) μs	IT	^{180m1}Ta	(24+)		
^{181}Ta	73	108	180.9479985(17)	1932	Observationally stable (Note: Believed to undergo α decay to ^{177}Lu)			7/2+	0.9998799(32)	
^{181m1}Ta	6.237(20) keV			1961	6.05(12) μs	IT	^{181}Ta	9/2−		
^{181m2}Ta	615.19(3) keV			1946	18(1) μs	IT	^{181}Ta	1/2+		
^{181m3}Ta	1428(14) keV			1998	140(36) ns	IT	^{181}Ta	19/2+#		
^{181m4}Ta	1483.43(21) keV			1998	25.2(18) μs	IT	^{181}Ta	21/2−		
^{181m5}Ta	2227.9(9) keV			1998	210(20) μs	IT	^{181}Ta	29/2−		
^{182}Ta	73	109	181.9501546(17)	1938	114.74(12) d	β^{−}	^{182}W	3−		
^{182m1}Ta	16.273(4) keV			1968	283(3) ms	IT	^{182}Ta	5+		
^{182m2}Ta	519.577(16) keV			1947	15.84(10) min	IT	^{182}Ta	10−		
^{183}Ta	73	110	182.9513754(17)	1950	5.1(1) d	β^{−}	^{183}W	7/2+		
^{183m1}Ta	73.164(14) keV			1967	106(10) ns	IT	^{183}Ta	9/2−		
^{183m2}Ta	470(10)# keV			2026	42(5) μs	IT	^{183}Ta	(1/2+)		
^{183m3}Ta	1335(14) keV			2009	0.9(3) μs	IT	^{183}Ta	(19/2+)		
^{184}Ta	73	111	183.954010(28)	1955	8.7(1) h	β^{−}	^{184}W	(5−)		
^{185}Ta	73	112	184.955561(15)	1950	49.4(15) min	β^{−}	^{185}W	(7/2+)		
^{185m1}Ta	406(1) keV			2007	0.9(3) μs	IT	^{185}Ta	(3/2+)		
^{185m2}Ta	1273.4(4) keV			1999	11.8(14) ms	IT	^{185}Ta	21/2−		
^{186}Ta	73	113	185.958553(64)	1955	10.5(3) min	β^{−}	^{186}W	3#		
^{186m1}Ta	336(20) keV			2004	1.54(5) min			9+#		
^{186m2}Ta	347.9(3) keV			2021	17(2) s			7+#		
^{187}Ta	73	114	186.960391(60)	1999	2.3(6) min	β^{−}	^{187}W	(7/2+)		
^{187m1}Ta	1778(1) keV			2010	7.3(9) s	IT	^{187}Ta	(25/2−)		
^{187m2}Ta	2933(14) keV			2010	136(24) s	β^{−}	^{187m}W	41/2+# [≥35/2]		
^{187m2}Ta	2933(14) keV			2010	136(24) s	IT	^{187m1}Ta	41/2+# [≥35/2]		
^{188}Ta	73	115	187.96360(22)#	1999	19.6(20) s	β^{−}	^{188}W	(1−)		
^{188m1}Ta	99(33) keV			2009	19.6(20) s			(7−)		
^{188m2}Ta	391(33) keV			2005	3.6(4) μs	IT	^{188}Ta	10+#		
^{189}Ta	73	116	188.96569(22)#	1999	20# s [>300 ns]	β^{−}	^{189}W	7/2+#		
^{189m}Ta	1309 keV			2009	1.20(7) μs	IT	^{189}Ta	(19/2+)		
^{189m2}Ta	1444 keV			2025	160(20) ns	IT	^{189}Ta	(21/2−)		
^{190}Ta	73	117	189.96917(22)#	2009	5.3(7) s	β^{−}	^{190}W	(3)		
^{191}Ta	73	118	190.97153(32)#	2009	460# ms [>300 ns]			7/2+#		
^{192}Ta	73	119	191.97520(43)#	2009	2.2(7) s	β^{−}	^{192}W	(2)		
^{193}Ta	73	120	192.97766(43)#	2012	220# ms [>300 ns]			7/2+#		
^{194}Ta	73	121	193.98161(54)#	2012	2# s [>300 ns]					
^{195}Ta	73	122		2026						
^{196}Ta	73	123		2026						
This table header & footer:

== Tantalum-180m ==
The nuclide ^{180m}Ta (m denotes a metastable state) is one of a very few nuclear isomers which are more stable than their ground states. Although it is not unique in this regard (this property is shared by bismuth-210m (^{210m}Bi) and americium-242m (^{242m}Am), among other nuclides), it is exceptional in that it is observationally stable: no decay has ever been observed. In contrast, the ground state nuclide ^{180}Ta has a half-life of only 8 hours.

^{180m}Ta has sufficient energy to decay in three ways: isomeric transition to the ground state of ^{180}Ta, beta decay to ^{180}W, or electron capture to ^{180}Hf. However, no radioactivity from any of these theoretically possible decay modes has ever been observed. As of 2023, the half-life of ^{180m}Ta is calculated from experimental observation to be at least 2.9×10^{17} (290 quadrillion) years. The very slow decay of ^{180m}Ta is attributed to its high spin (9 units) and the low spin of lower-lying states. Gamma or beta decay would require many units of angular momentum to be removed in a single step, so that the process would be very slow. Similar suppression of gamma or beta decay occurs for ^{210m}Bi, a long-lived alpha emitter.

Because of this stability, ^{180m}Ta is a primordial nuclide, the only naturally occurring nuclear isomer (excluding short-lived radiogenic and cosmogenic nuclides). It presents one of two apparent violations of the Mattauch isobar rule, the other involving tellurium-123. It is also the rarest primordial nuclide in the Universe observed for any element which has any stable isotopes. In an s-process stellar environment with a thermal energy k_{B}T = 26 keV (i.e. a temperature of 300 million kelvin), the nuclear isomers are expected to be fully thermalized, meaning that ^{180}Ta is equilibrated between spin states and its overall half-life is predicted to be 11 hours.

It is one of only five stable nuclides to have both an odd number of protons and an odd number of neutrons, the other four stable odd-odd nuclides being ^{2}H, ^{6}Li, ^{10}B and ^{14}N.

== See also ==
Daughter products other than tantalum

- Isotopes of tungsten
- Isotopes of hafnium
- Isotopes of lutetium
