= B. Alex Brown =

American physicist

- Born: September 25, 1948 (age 78); Mt. Sterling, Ohio, U.S.
- Education: Ohio State University (BA); Stony Brook University (MS, PhD)
- Awards: Fellow of the American Physical Society (1987); Humboldt Research Award for Senior U.S. Scientists (1991); University Distinguished Faculty Award (2004)
- Scientific career
- Fields: Nuclear physics; Nuclear structure; Nuclear shell model; Nuclear astrophysics
- Workplaces: University of Tokyo; Oxford; Michigan State University
- Thesis: (1974)
- Doctoral advisor: Dave Fossan

Boyd Alexander Brown (born September 25, 1948) is an American theoretical nuclear physicist and Professor of Physics at Michigan State University. He holds a joint appointment in the Department of Physics and Astronomy and the Facility for Rare IsotopeBeams. His most notable research is on the nuclear shell model and nuclear configuration interaction theory.

In 1987, Brown became a Fellow of the American Physical Society. In 1991 he received the Humboldt Research Award for Senior U.S. Scientists for stays at GSI Helmholtz Centre for Heavy Ion Research in Darmstadt and at the University of Tübingen. In 2004 Brown received the University Distinguished Faculty Award at Michigan State University.

== Education ==
In 1970, Brown received his B.A. in Physics from Ohio State University. In 1971, he attended the State University of New York at Stony Brook, earning his M.S. in Physics. He received his Ph.D. in January 1974.

== Career ==
From January 1974 to January 1975 he was a research fellow at the University of Tokyo, supported by the Japan Society for the Promotion of Science. He worked with Akito Arima on core-polarization charge near doubly-magic nuclei.

From January 1978 to February 1982 he served as a research officer at the Nuclear Physics Laboratory, University of Oxford, collaborating with P. E. Hodgson on the systematics of nuclear charge radii and W. A. Richter on parity-violation in nuclei.

In 1982-1986 he was an associate professor at the National Superconducting Cyclotron Laboratory at Michigan State University. In 1986-1990 he was an Associate Professor in the Department of Physics and Astronomy, and in 1990 became a full Professor. He his now an Emeritus Professor in the Department of Physics and Astronomy, and a Professor at the Facility for Rare Isotope Beams at Michigan State University.

== Research ==
Brown's research addresses questions in physics and astrophysics, including the nature of the forces governing nuclear matter, the origin of the elements in the Universe, and the emergence of collective and chaotic behavior in quantum many-body systems.

Brown developed the nuclear shell model, also known as the nuclear configuration interaction method. He collaborated with Wildenthal, on the application of his universal Hamiltonian to the properties of nuclei in the sd-shell (nuclei with mass number A ≈ 17–40), that included a review of the field. Work with Richter, included the development of the "USD" family of effective Hamiltonians for the sd-shell. Brown extended the NuShellX computer code developed by W. M. D. Rae into a widely used resource for calculating wavefunctions and observables in nuclear physics.

His work with Warburton explained why the magic number 20 disappears in neutron-rich nuclei with proton number below Z=14 creating an region of nuclei they called an “island-of-inversion”. His work with Otsuka explained how the magic number 28 disappears in neutron-rich below Z=16 due to the spin-tensor properties of the nucleon–nucleon interaction.

In 2000, Brown used Skyrme Hartree–Fock calculations to show that the neutron skin thickness of heavy nuclei, an accessible laboratory observable, is directly linked to the equation of state of neutron-star matter, providing a means to constrain astrophysical models from nuclear measurements. In 2017 he proposed that charge-radii measurements on mirror nuclei, pairs of nuclei related by exchanging protons and neutrons, offer a faster and more direct route to the same constraints.

== Awards ==
- Fellow of the American Physical Society (1987)
- Humboldt Research Award for Senior U.S. Scientists (1991), awarded by the Alexander von Humboldt Foundation
- University Distinguished Faculty Award, Michigan State University (2004)
