= Nucleogenic =

Made by a natural terrestrial nuclear reaction

A nucleogenic isotope, or nuclide, is one that is produced by a natural terrestrial nuclear reaction, other than a reaction beginning with cosmic rays (the latter nuclides by convention are called by the different term cosmogenic). The nuclear reaction that produces nucleogenic nuclides is usually interaction with an alpha particle or the capture of fission or thermal neutrons. Some nucleogenic isotopes are stable and others are radioactive.

== Example ==
An example of a nucleogenic nuclide is neon-21 produced from neon-20 that absorbs a thermal neutron (though some neon-21 is also primordial). Other nucleogenic reactions that produce heavy neon isotopes are (fast neutron capture, alpha emission) reactions, starting with magnesium-24 and magnesium-25, respectively. The source of the neutrons in these reactions is often secondary neutrons produced by alpha radiation from natural uranium and thorium in rock.

== Types ==
Because nucleogenic isotopes have been produced later than the birth of the Solar System (and the nucleosynthetic events that preceded it), nucleogenic isotopes, by definition, are not primordial nuclides. However, nucleogenic isotopes should not be confused with much more common radiogenic nuclides that are also younger than primordial nuclides, but which arise as simple daughter isotopes from radioactive decay. Nucleogenic isotopes, as noted, are the result of a more complicated nuclear reaction, although such reactions may begin with a radioactive decay event.

Alpha particles that produce nucleogenic reactions come from natural alpha particle emitters in uranium and thorium decay chains. Neutrons to produce nucleogenic nuclides may be produced by a number of processes, but due to the short half-life of free neutrons, all of these reactions occur on Earth. Among the most common are cosmic ray spallation production of neutrons from elements near the surface of the Earth. Alpha emission produced by some radioactive decay also produces neutrons by spallation knockout of neutron rich isotopes, such as the reaction of alpha particles with oxygen-18. Neutrons are also produced by neutron emission (a form of radioactive decay in some neutron-rich nuclides) and spontaneous fission of fissile isotopes on Earth (particularly uranium-235).

== Nucleogenesis ==
Nucleogenesis (also known as nucleosynthesis) as a general phenomenon is a process usually associated with production of nuclides in the Big Bang or in stars, by nuclear reactions there. Some of these neutron reactions (such as the r-process and s-process) involve absorption by atomic nuclei of high-temperature (high energy) neutrons from the star. These processes produce most of the chemical elements in the universe heavier than zirconium (element 40), because nuclear fusion processes become increasingly inefficient and unlikely for elements heavier than this. By convention, such heavier elements produced in normal elemental abundance, are not referred to as "nucleogenic". Instead, this term is reserved for nuclides (isotopes) made on Earth from natural nuclear reactions.

Also, the term "nucleogenic" by convention excludes artificially produced radionuclides, for example tritium, many of which are produced in large amounts by a similar artificial processes, but using the copious neutron flux produced by conventional nuclear reactors.
