= Mass excess =

Difference between actual mass and mass number for nuclei

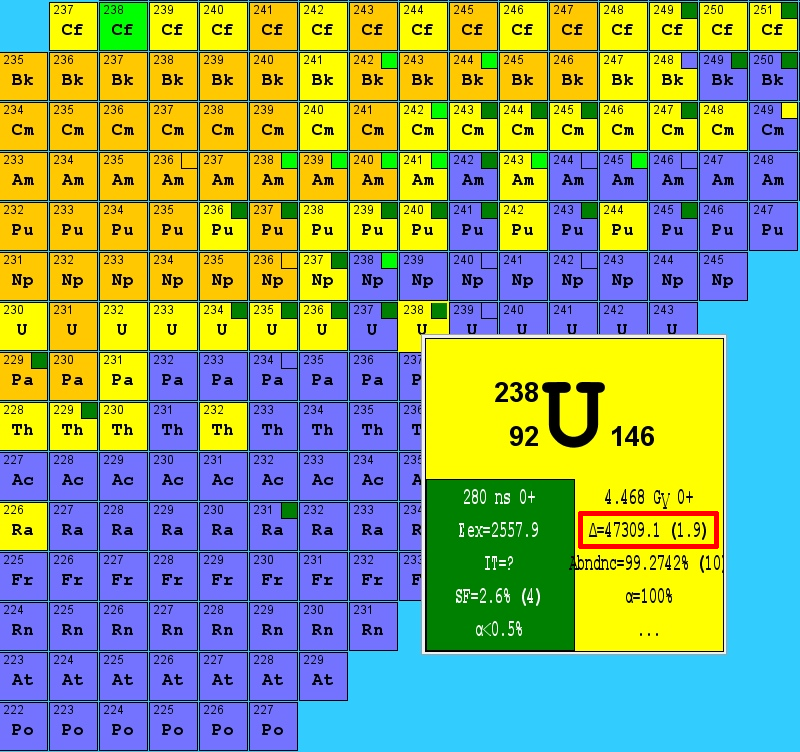
Mass excess U-238 (indicated with a red outline) and other data of the nuclide (Data source: Nubase 2012, graphical representation: Nuclear data viewer JANIS)

The mass excess of a nuclide is the difference between its actual mass and its mass number multiplied by the atomic mass unit (dalton). It is one of the predominant methods for tabulating nuclear mass. The mass of an atomic nucleus is well approximated (less than 0.1% difference for most nuclides) by its mass number, which indicates that most of the mass of a nucleus arises from mass of its constituent protons and neutrons. Thus, the mass excess is an expression of the nuclear binding energy, relative to the binding energy per nucleon of carbon-12 (which defines the dalton). If the mass excess is negative, the nucleus has more binding energy than ^{12}C, and vice versa. If a nucleus has a large excess of mass compared to a nearby nuclear species, it can radioactively decay, releasing energy.

== Energy scale of nuclear reactions ==
The ^{12}C standard provides a convenient unit (the dalton) in which to express nuclear mass for defining the mass excess. However, its usefulness arises in the calculation of nuclear reaction kinematics or decay. Only a small fraction of the total energy that is associated with an atomic nucleus by mass–energy equivalence, on the order of 0.01% to 0.1% of the total mass, may be absorbed or liberated as radiation. By working in terms of the mass excess, much of the mass changes which arise from the transfer or release of nucleons is effectively removed, highlighting the net energy difference.

Nuclear reaction kinematics are customarily performed in units involving the electronvolt, which derives from accelerator technology. The combination of this practical point with the theoretical relation E = mc^{2} makes the unit megaelectronvolt over the speed of light squared (MeV/c^{2}) a convenient form in which to express nuclear mass. However, the numerical values of nuclear masses in MeV/c^{2} are quite large (even the proton mass is ~938.27 MeV/c^{2}), while mass excesses range in the tens of MeV/c^{2}. This makes tabulated mass excess less cumbersome for use in calculations. The 1/c^{2} factor is typically omitted when quoting mass excess values in MeV, since the interest is more often energy and not mass; if one wanted units of mass, one would simply change the units from MeV to MeV/c^{2} without altering the numerical value.

== Example ==
Consider the nuclear fission of ^{236}U into ^{92}Kr, ^{141}Ba, and three neutrons.

^{236}U → ^{92}Kr + ^{141}Ba + 3 n

The mass number of the reactant, ^{236}U, is 236. Because the actual mass is 236.045563 Da, its mass excess is +0.045563 Da. Calculated in the same manner, the respective mass excesses for the products, ^{92}Kr, ^{141}Ba, and three neutrons, are −0.073843 Da, −0.085588 Da and 3 × 0.008665 Da = +0.025994 Da, respectively, for a total mass excess of −0.133437 Da. The difference between the mass excess of the reactants and that of the products is 0.179000 Da, which shows that the mass excess of the products is less than that of the reactants, and so the fission can occur – a calculation which could have also been done with only the masses of the reactants.

The mass excess can be converted into energy using 1 Da = 931.494 MeV/c^{2}, and E = mc^{2}, yielding 166.737 MeV.
