= Isotope =

Atoms of the same element, but different mass

The three naturally occurring isotopes of hydrogen. The fact that each nuclide has 1 proton makes them all isotopes of hydrogen: the identity of the isotope is given by the number of protons and neutrons. From left to right, the isotopes are protium (^{1}H) with 0 neutrons, deuterium (^{2}H) with 1 neutron, and tritium (^{3}H) with 2 neutrons.

Isotopes are distinct nuclear species (or nuclides) of the same chemical element. They have the same atomic number (number of protons in their nuclei) and position in the periodic table (and hence belong to the same chemical element), but different nucleon numbers (mass numbers) due to different numbers of neutrons in their nuclei. While all isotopes of a given element have virtually the same chemical properties, they have different atomic masses and physical properties.

The term isotope comes from the Greek roots isos (ἴσος "equal") and topos (τόπος "place"), meaning "the same place": different isotopes of an element occupy the same place on the periodic table. It was coined by Scottish doctor and writer Margaret Todd in a 1913 suggestion to the British chemist Frederick Soddy, who popularized the term.

The number of protons within the atom's nucleus is called its atomic number and is equal to the number of electrons in the neutral (non-ionized) atom. Each atomic number identifies a specific element, but not the isotope; an atom of a given element may have a wide range in its number of neutrons. The number of nucleons (both protons and neutrons) in the nucleus is the atom's mass number, and each isotope of a given element has a different mass number.

For example, carbon-12, carbon-13, and carbon-14 are three isotopes of the element carbon with atomic mass numbers 12, 13, and 14, respectively. The atomic number of carbon is 6, which means that every carbon atom has 6 protons so that the neutron numbers of these isotopes are 6, 7, and 8 respectively.

== Isotope vs. nuclide ==
A nuclide is a species of an atom with a specific number of protons and neutrons in the nucleus, for example, carbon-13 with 6 protons and 7 neutrons. Thus the terms are roughly the same, but the nuclide concept (referring to individual nuclear species) emphasizes nuclear properties over chemical properties, whereas the isotope concept (grouping all atoms of each element) emphasizes chemical over nuclear. The neutron number greatly affects nuclear properties, but its effect on chemical properties is negligible for most elements. Even for the lightest elements, whose ratio of neutron number to atomic number varies the most between isotopes, it usually has only a small effect although it matters in some circumstances (for hydrogen, the lightest element, the isotope effect is large enough to affect biology strongly). The term isotopes (originally also isotopic elements, now sometimes isotopic nuclides) is intended to imply comparison (like synonyms or isomers). For example, the nuclides ^{12}_{6}C, ^{13}_{6}C, ^{14}_{6}C are isotopes (nuclides with the same atomic number but different mass numbers), but ^{40}_{18}Ar, ^{40}_{19}K, ^{40}_{20}Ca are isobars (nuclides with the same mass number). As the older and better-known term, isotope is however still used in some contexts where nuclide might be more appropriate, such as in nuclear technology and nuclear medicine.

== Notation ==
An explanation of the superscripts and subscripts seen in AZE notation.

An isotope or nuclide is specified by the name of the element (which implies the atomic number) followed by a hyphen and the mass number (e.g. helium-3, helium-4, carbon-12, carbon-14, uranium-235 and uranium-239). When a element symbol is used, e.g. "C" for carbon, it is standard to use "AZE notation" which has the form ^{A}_{Z}E, where A is the mass number written as a superscript, Z is the atomic number written as a subscript, and E is the element symbol (e.g. ^{3}_{2}He, ^{4}_{2}He, ^{12}_{6}C, ^{14}_{6}C, ^{235}_{92}U, and ^{239}_{92}U). Because the atomic number is already fixed by the element symbol, it is common to state only the mass number in the superscript and leave out the atomic number subscript (e.g. ^{3}He, ^{4}He, ^{12}C, ^{14}C, ^{235}U, and ^{239}U). The letter m (for metastable) is appended after the mass number to indicate a nuclear isomer, a metastable or energetically excited nuclear state (as opposed to the lowest-energy ground state), for example ^{180m}_{73}Ta (tantalum-180m); a number can be appended to it to distinguish different metastable states, though this is rare in practice.

The common pronunciation of the AZE notation is different from how it is written: ^{4}_{2}He is commonly pronounced helium-four instead of four-two-helium, and ^{235}_{92}U uranium two-thirty-five (American English) or uranium-two-three-five (British) instead of 235-92-uranium or 235-uranium. This is not an error but the original spoken usage for isotope names, originating before AZE notation became established.

== Radioactive, primordial, and stable isotopes ==
Some isotopes/nuclides are radioactive, and are therefore called radioisotopes or radionuclides, whereas others have never been observed to decay radioactively and are called stable isotopes or stable nuclides. For example, ^{14}C is a radioactive form of carbon, while ^{12}C and ^{13}C are stable isotopes. There are about 339 naturally occurring nuclides on Earth, of which 286 are primordial nuclides, meaning that they have existed since the Solar System's formation.

Primordial nuclides include 35 nuclides with very long half-lives (over 100 million years) and 251 that are considered "stable nuclides", as they have not been observed to decay. In most cases, if an element has stable isotopes, those isotopes predominate in the elemental abundance found on Earth and in the Solar System. However, in the cases of three elements (tellurium, indium, and rhenium) the most abundant isotope found in nature is actually one (or two) extremely long-lived radioisotope(s) of the element, despite these elements having one or more stable isotopes.

Theory predicts that many apparently "stable" nuclides are radioactive, with extremely long half-lives (discounting the possibility of proton decay, which would make all nuclides ultimately unstable). Some stable nuclides are in theory energetically susceptible to other known forms of decay, such as alpha decay or double beta decay, but no decay products have yet been observed, and so these isotopes are said to be "observationally stable". The predicted half-lives for these nuclides often greatly exceed the estimated age of the universe, and in fact, there are also 31 known radionuclides (see primordial nuclide) with half-lives longer than the age of the universe.

The total of all known nuclides, of which most have been created only artificially, is several thousand, of which 987 are stable or have a half-life longer than one hour; see List of nuclides.

== History ==
=== Radioactive isotopes ===
The existence of isotopes was first suggested in 1913 by the radiochemist Frederick Soddy, based on studies of radioactive decay chains that indicated about 40 different species referred to as radioelements (i.e. radioactive elements) between uranium and lead, although the periodic table only allowed for 11 elements between lead and uranium inclusive.

Several attempts to separate these new radioelements chemically had failed. For example, Soddy had shown in 1910 that mesothorium (later shown to be ^{228}Ra), radium (^{226}Ra, the longest-lived isotope), and thorium X (^{224}Ra) are impossible to separate. Attempts to place the radioelements in the periodic table led Soddy and Kazimierz Fajans independently to propose their radioactive displacement law in 1913, to the effect that alpha decay produced an element two places to the left in the periodic table, whereas beta decay emission produced an element one place to the right. Soddy recognized that emission of an alpha particle followed by two beta particles led to the formation of an element chemically identical to the initial element but with a mass four units lighter and with different radioactive properties.

Soddy proposed that several types of atoms (differing in radioactive properties) could occupy the same place in the table. For example, the alpha-decay of uranium-235 forms thorium-231, whereas the beta decay of actinium-230 forms thorium-230. The term "isotope", Greek for "at the same place", was suggested to Soddy by Margaret Todd, a Scottish physician and family friend, during a conversation in which he explained his ideas to her. He received the 1921 Nobel Prize in Chemistry in part for his work on isotopes.

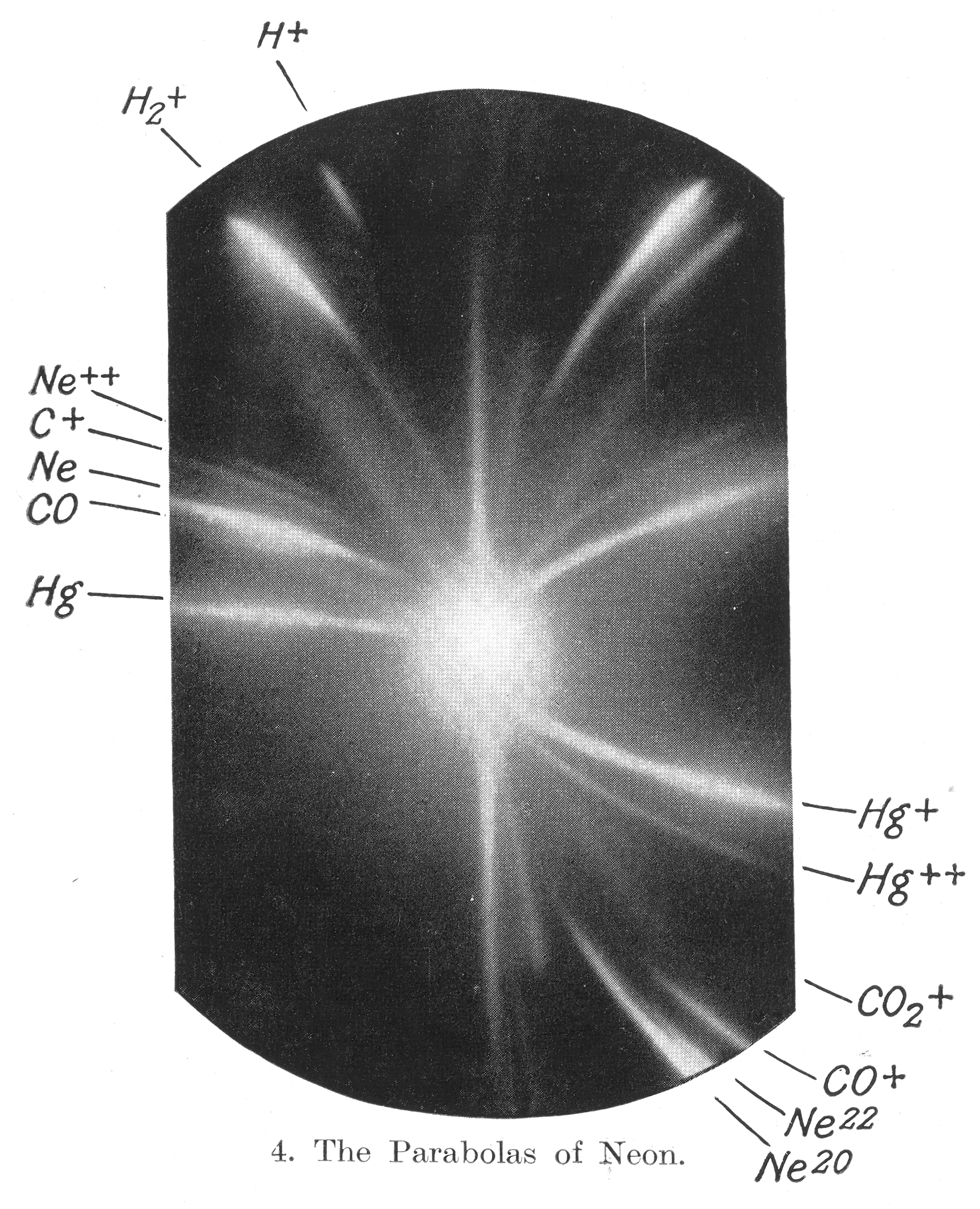
In the bottom right corner of J. J. Thomson's photographic plate are the separate impact marks for the two isotopes of neon: neon-20 and neon-22.

In 1914 T. W. Richards found variations between the atomic weight of lead from different mineral sources, attributable to radiogenic variations in isotopic composition; the natural radioactive series ending with three different isotopes of lead.

=== Stable isotopes ===
The first evidence for multiple isotopes of a stable (non-radioactive) element was found by J. J. Thomson in 1912/1913 as part of his exploration into the composition of canal rays (positive ions). Thomson channelled streams of ions through parallel magnetic and electric fields, measured their deflection by placing a photographic plate in their path, and computed their mass to charge ratio using a method that became known as the Thomson's parabola method. Each 'line' could be identified with a specific atomic weight, and therefore different elements and compounds could be identified. Thomson's initial paper in the Philosophical Magazine explains the technique used, but makes no comment on anomalous lines; however, in a talk given to the Royal Institution on 17 January 1913 Thomson identified "a line corresponding to an atomic weight 22, which can not be identified with the line due to any known gas". He went on to comment that

The origin of this line presents many points of interest; there are no known gaseous compounds of any of the recognized elements which have this molecular weight. Again, if we accept Mendeleef's Periodic Law, there is no room for a new element with this atomic weight.

The same lecture was then given to the Cambridge Philosophical Society on 27 January 1913, and later in the year Thomson presented his mature interpretation as the Royal Society's Bakerian Lecture. There he again showed the image of parabolic patches of light on the photographic plate (see image), which suggested two species of neon nuclei with different mass-to-charge ratios. He wrote "There can, therefore, I think, be little doubt that what has been called neon is not a simple gas but a mixture of two gases, one of which has an atomic weight about 20 and the other about 22. The parabola due to the heavier gas is always much fainter than that due to the lighter, so that probably the heavier gas forms only a small percentage of the mixture."

F. W. Aston subsequently discovered multiple stable isotopes for numerous elements using a mass spectrograph, related to Thomson's method. In 1919 Aston studied neon with sufficient resolution to show that the two isotopic masses are very close to the integers 20 and 22, and that neither is equal to the known molar mass (20.2) of neon gas. This is an example of Aston's whole number rule for isotopic masses, now known to be exceptionless, which states that large deviations of elemental molar masses from integers are due to the fact that the element is a mixture of isotopes. Aston similarly showed in 1920 that the molar mass of chlorine (35.45) is a weighted average of the almost integral masses for the two isotopes ^{35}Cl and ^{37}Cl.

=== Neutrons ===
After the discovery of the neutron by James Chadwick in 1932, the ultimate root cause for the existence of isotopes was clarified, that is, the nuclei of different isotopes for a given element have different numbers of neutrons, albeit having the same number of protons.

== Variation in properties between isotopes ==
=== Chemical and molecular properties ===
A neutral atom has the same number of electrons as protons. Thus different isotopes of a given element all have the same number of electrons and share a similar electronic structure. Because the chemical behaviour of an atom is largely determined by its electronic structure, different isotopes exhibit nearly identical chemical behaviour.

The main exception to this is the kinetic isotope effect: due to their larger masses, heavier isotopes tend to react somewhat more slowly than lighter isotopes of the same element. This is most pronounced by far for protium (^{1}H), deuterium (^{2}H), and tritium (^{3}H), because deuterium has twice the mass of protium and tritium has three times the mass of protium. These mass differences also affect the behavior of their respective chemical bonds, by changing the center of gravity (reduced mass) of the atomic systems. However, for heavier elements, the relative mass difference between isotopes is much less so that the mass-difference effects on chemistry are usually negligible. (Heavy elements also have relatively more neutrons than lighter elements, so the ratio of the nuclear mass to the collective electronic mass is slightly greater.) There is also an equilibrium isotope effect.

Isotope half-lives. Z = number of protons. N = number of neutrons. The plot for stable isotopes diverges from the line Z = N as the element number Z becomes larger

Similarly, two molecules that differ only in the isotopes of their atoms (isotopologues) have identical electronic structures, and therefore almost indistinguishable physical and chemical properties (again with deuterium and tritium being the primary exceptions). The vibrational modes of a molecule are determined by its shape and by the masses of its constituent atoms; so different isotopologues have different sets of vibrational modes. Because vibrational modes allow a molecule to absorb photons of corresponding energies, isotopologues have different optical properties in the infrared range.

=== Nuclear properties and stability ===
Atomic nuclei consist of protons and neutrons bound together by the residual strong force. Because protons are positively charged, they repel each other. Neutrons, which are electrically neutral, stabilize the nucleus in two ways. Their copresence pushes protons slightly apart, reducing the electrostatic repulsion between the protons, and they exert an attractive nuclear force on each other and on protons. For this reason, one or more neutrons are necessary for two or more protons to bind into a nucleus. As the number of protons increases, so does the ratio of neutrons to protons necessary to ensure a stable nucleus (see graph at right). For example, although the neutron:proton ratio of ^{3}_{2}He is 1:2, the neutron:proton ratio of ^{238}_{92}U is greater than 3:2. A number of lighter elements have stable nuclides with the ratio 1:1 (Z = N). The nuclide ^{40}_{20}Ca (calcium-40) is observationally the heaviest stable nuclide with the same number of neutrons and protons. All stable nuclides heavier than calcium-40 contain more neutrons than protons.

=== Numbers of isotopes per element ===
Of the 80 elements with a stable isotope, the largest number of stable isotopes observed for any element is ten (for the element tin). No element has nine or eight stable isotopes. Five elements have seven stable isotopes, seven have six stable isotopes, eleven have five stable isotopes, nine have four stable isotopes, five have three stable isotopes, 16 have two stable isotopes (counting ^{180m}_{73}Ta as stable), and 26 elements have only a single stable isotope (of these, 19 are so-called mononuclidic elements, having a single primordial stable isotope that dominates and fixes the atomic weight of the natural element to high precision; two radioactive mononuclidic elements occur as well). In total, there are 251 nuclides that have not been observed to decay. For the 80 elements that have one or more stable isotopes, the average number of stable isotopes is 251/80 ≈ 3.14 isotopes per element.

=== Even and odd nucleon numbers ===
Even/odd Z, N (^{1}H as OE)
p, n	EE	OO	EO	OE	Total
Stable	145	5	53	48	251
Long-lived	23	4	3	5	35
All primordial	168	9	56	53	286

The proton:neutron ratio is not the only factor affecting nuclear stability. It depends also on evenness or oddness of its atomic number Z, neutron number N and, consequently, of their sum, the mass number A. Oddness of both Z and N tends to lower the nuclear binding energy, making odd nuclei, generally, less stable. This remarkable difference of nuclear binding energy between neighbouring nuclei, especially of odd-A isobars, has important consequences: unstable isotopes with a nonoptimal number of neutrons or protons decay by beta decay (including positron emission), electron capture, or other less common decay modes such as spontaneous fission and cluster decay.

Most stable nuclides are even-proton-even-neutron, where all numbers Z, N, and A are even. The odd-A stable nuclides are divided (roughly evenly) into odd-proton-even-neutron, and even-proton-odd-neutron nuclides. Stable odd-proton-odd-neutron nuclides are the least common.

==== Even atomic number ====
The 146 even-proton, even-neutron (EE) nuclides comprise ~58% of all stable nuclides and all have spin 0 because of pairing. There are also 24 primordial long-lived even-even nuclides. As a result, each of the 41 even-numbered elements from 2 to 82 has at least one stable isotope, and most of these elements have several primordial isotopes. Half of these even-numbered elements have six or more stable isotopes. The extreme stability of helium-4 due to a double pairing of 2 protons and 2 neutrons prevents any nuclides containing five (^{5}_{2}He, ^{5}_{3}Li) or eight (^{8}_{4}Be) nucleons from existing long enough to serve as platforms for the buildup of heavier elements via nuclear fusion in stars (see triple alpha process).

Even-odd long-lived
	Decay	Half-life
^{113}_{48}Cd	beta	7.7×10^{15} a
^{147}_{62}Sm	alpha	1.06×10^{11} a
^{235}_{92}U	alpha	7.04×10^{8} a

Only five stable nuclides contain both an odd number of protons and an odd number of neutrons. The first four "odd-odd" nuclides occur in low mass nuclides, for which changing a proton to a neutron or vice versa would lead to a very lopsided proton-neutron ratio (^{2}_{1}H, ^{6}_{3}Li, ^{10}_{5}B, and ^{14}_{7}N; spins 1, 1, 3, 1). The only other entirely "stable" odd-odd nuclide, ^{180m}_{73}Ta (spin 9), is thought to be the rarest of the 251 stable nuclides, and is the only primordial nuclear isomer, which has not yet been observed to decay despite experimental attempts.

Many odd-odd radionuclides (such as the ground state of tantalum-180) with comparatively short half-lives are known. Usually, they beta-decay to their nearby even-even isobars that have paired protons and paired neutrons. Of the nine primordial odd-odd nuclides (five stable and four radioactive with long half-lives), only ^{14}_{7}N is the most common isotope of a common element. This is the case because it is a part of the CNO cycle. The nuclides ^{6}_{3}Li and ^{10}_{5}B are minority isotopes of elements that are themselves rare compared to other light elements, whereas the other six isotopes make up only a tiny percentage of the natural abundance of their elements.

==== Odd atomic number ====
53 stable nuclides have an even number of protons and an odd number of neutrons. They are a minority in comparison to the even-even isotopes, which are about 3 times as numerous. Among the 41 even-Z elements that have a stable nuclide, only two elements (argon and cerium) have no even-odd stable nuclides. One element (tin) has three. There are 24 elements that have one even-odd nuclide and 13 that have two odd-even nuclides. Of 35 primordial radionuclides there exist four even-odd nuclides (see table at right), including the fissile ^{235}_{92}U. Because of their odd neutron numbers, the even-odd nuclides tend to have large neutron capture cross-sections, due to the energy that results from neutron-pairing effects. These stable even-proton odd-neutron nuclides tend to be uncommon by abundance in nature, generally because, to form and enter into primordial abundance, they must have escaped capturing neutrons to form yet other stable even-even isotopes, during both the s-process and r-process of neutron capture, during nucleosynthesis in stars. For this reason, only ^{195}_{78}Pt and ^{9}_{4}Be are the most naturally abundant isotopes of their element.

48 stable odd-proton-even-neutron nuclides, stabilized by their paired neutrons, form most of the stable isotopes of the odd-numbered elements; the very few odd-proton-odd-neutron nuclides comprise the others. There are 41 odd-numbered elements with Z = 1 through 81, of which 39 have stable isotopes (technetium (_{43}Tc) and promethium (_{61}Pm) have no stable isotopes). Of these 39 odd Z elements, 30 elements (including hydrogen-1 where 0 neutrons is even) have one stable odd-even isotope, and nine elements: chlorine (_{17}Cl), potassium (_{19}K), copper (_{29}Cu), gallium (_{31}Ga), bromine (_{35}Br), silver (_{47}Ag), antimony (_{51}Sb), iridium (_{77}Ir), and thallium (_{81}Tl), have two odd-even stable isotopes each. This makes a total 30 + 2(9) = 48 stable odd-even isotopes.

There are also five primordial long-lived radioactive odd-even isotopes, ^{87}_{37}Rb, ^{115}_{49}In, ^{187}_{75}Re, ^{151}_{63}Eu, and ^{209}_{83}Bi. The last two were only recently found to decay, with half-lives greater than 10^{18} years.

==== Odd neutron number ====
Neutron number parity (^{1}H as even)
N	Even	Odd
Stable	193	58
Long-lived	28	7
All primordial	221	65

Actinides with odd neutron number are generally fissile (with thermal neutrons), whereas those with even neutron number are generally not, though they are fissionable with fast neutrons. All observationally stable odd-odd nuclides have nonzero integer spin. This is because the single unpaired neutron and unpaired proton have a larger nuclear force attraction to each other if their spins are aligned (producing a total spin of at least 1 unit), instead of anti-aligned. See deuterium for the simplest case of this nuclear behavior.

Only ^{195}_{78}Pt, ^{9}_{4}Be, and ^{14}_{7}N have odd neutron number and are the most naturally abundant isotope of their element.

== Occurrence in nature ==
Elements are composed either of one nuclide (mononuclidic elements), or of more than one naturally occurring isotopes. The unstable (radioactive) isotopes are either primordial or postprimordial. Primordial isotopes were a product of stellar nucleosynthesis or another type of nucleosynthesis such as cosmic ray spallation, and have persisted down to the present because their rate of decay is very slow (e.g. uranium-238 and potassium-40). Post-primordial isotopes were created by cosmic ray bombardment as cosmogenic nuclides (e.g., tritium, carbon-14), or by the decay of a radioactive primordial isotope to a radioactive radiogenic nuclide daughter (e.g. uranium to radium). A few isotopes are naturally synthesized as nucleogenic nuclides, by some other natural nuclear reaction, such as when neutrons from natural nuclear fission are absorbed by another atom.

As discussed above, only 80 elements have any stable isotopes, and 26 of these have only one stable isotope. Thus, about two-thirds of stable elements occur naturally on Earth in multiple stable isotopes, with the largest number of stable isotopes for an element being ten, for tin (_{50}Sn). There are about 94 elements found naturally on Earth (up to plutonium inclusive), though some are detected only in very tiny amounts, such as plutonium-244. Scientists estimate that the elements that occur naturally on Earth (some only as radioisotopes) occur as 339 isotopes (nuclides) in total. Only 251 of these naturally occurring nuclides are stable, in the sense of never having been observed to decay as of the present time. An additional 35 primordial nuclides (to a total of 286 primordial nuclides), are radioactive with known half-lives, but have half-lives longer than 100 million years, allowing them to exist from the beginning of the Solar System. See list of nuclides for details.

All the known stable nuclides occur naturally on Earth; the other naturally occurring nuclides are radioactive but occur on Earth due to their relatively long half-lives, or else due to other means of ongoing natural production. These include the afore-mentioned cosmogenic nuclides, the nucleogenic nuclides, and any radiogenic nuclides formed by ongoing decay of a primordial radioactive nuclide, such as radon and radium from uranium.

An additional ~3000 radioactive nuclides not found in nature have been created in nuclear reactors and in particle accelerators. Many short-lived nuclides not found naturally on Earth have also been observed by spectroscopic analysis, being naturally created in stars or supernovae. An example is aluminium-26, which is not naturally found on Earth but is found in abundance on an astronomical scale.

The tabulated atomic masses of elements are averages that account for the presence of multiple isotopes with different masses. Before the discovery of isotopes, empirically determined noninteger values of relative atomic mass confounded scientists. For example, a sample of chlorine contains 75.8% chlorine-35 and 24.2% chlorine-37, giving an average atomic mass of 35.5 daltons.

According to generally accepted cosmology theory, only isotopes of hydrogen and helium, traces of some isotopes of lithium and beryllium, and perhaps some boron, were created at the Big Bang, while all other nuclides were synthesized later, in stars and supernovae, and in interactions between energetic particles such as cosmic rays, and previously produced nuclides. (See nucleosynthesis for details of the various processes thought responsible for isotope production.) The respective abundances of isotopes on Earth result from the quantities formed by these processes, their spread through the galaxy, and the rates of decay for isotopes that are unstable. After the initial coalescence of the Solar System, isotopes were redistributed according to mass, and the isotopic composition of elements varies slightly from planet to planet. This sometimes makes it possible to trace the origin of meteorites.

== Atomic mass of isotopes ==
The atomic mass of an isotope (nuclide) is determined mainly by its atomic mass number (i.e. number of nucleons in its nucleus). Small corrections are due to the binding energy of the nucleus (see mass defect), the slight difference in mass between proton and neutron, and the mass of the electrons associated with the atom, the latter because the electron:nucleon ratio differs among isotopes.

The mass number is a dimensionless quantity. The atomic mass, on the other hand, is measured using the dalton (symbol Da), which is defined in terms of the mass of the carbon-12 atom. It is also called the unified atomic mass unit (symbol u).

The atomic masses of naturally occurring isotopes of an element determine the standard atomic weight of the element. When the element contains N isotopes, the expression below is applied for the average atomic mass $\overline m_a$:

$$\overline m_a = m_1 x_1+m_2 x_2+...+m_Nx_N$$

where m_{1}, m_{2}, ..., m_{N} are the atomic masses of each individual isotope, and x_{1}, ..., x_{N} are the relative abundances of these isotopes.

== Applications of isotopes ==
=== Purification of isotopes ===
Several applications exist that capitalize on the properties of the various isotopes of a given element. Isotope separation is a significant technological challenge, particularly with heavy elements such as uranium or plutonium. Lighter elements such as lithium, carbon, nitrogen, and oxygen are commonly separated by gas diffusion of their compounds such as CO and NO. The separation of hydrogen and deuterium is unusual because it is based on chemical rather than physical properties, for example in the Girdler sulfide process. Uranium isotopes have been separated in bulk by gas diffusion, gas centrifugation, laser ionization separation, and (in the Manhattan Project) by a type of production mass spectrometry.

=== Use of chemical and biological properties ===
- Isotope analysis is the determination of isotopic signature, the relative abundances of isotopes of a given element in a particular sample. Isotope analysis is frequently done by isotope ratio mass spectrometry. For biogenic substances in particular, significant variations of isotopes of C, N, and O can occur. Analysis of such variations has a wide range of applications, such as the detection of adulteration in food products or the geographic origins of products using isoscapes. The identification of certain meteorites as having originated on Mars is based in part upon the isotopic signature of trace gases contained in them.
- Isotopic substitution can be used to determine the mechanism of a chemical reaction via the kinetic isotope effect.
- Another common application is isotopic labeling, the use of unusual isotopes as tracers or markers in chemical reactions. Normally, atoms of a given element are indistinguishable from each other. However, by using isotopes of different masses, even different nonradioactive stable isotopes can be distinguished by mass spectrometry or infrared spectroscopy. For example, in 'stable isotope labeling with amino acids in cell culture (SILAC)' stable isotopes are used to quantify proteins. If radioactive isotopes are used, they can be detected by the radiation they emit (this is called radioisotopic labeling).
- Isotopes are commonly used to determine the concentration of various elements or substances using the isotope dilution method, whereby known amounts of isotopically substituted compounds are mixed with the samples and the isotopic signatures of the resulting mixtures are determined with mass spectrometry.

=== Use of nuclear properties ===
- A technique similar to radioisotopic labeling is radiometric dating: using the known half-life of an unstable element, one can calculate the amount of time that has elapsed since a known concentration of isotope existed. The most widely known example is radiocarbon dating used to determine the age of carbonaceous materials.
- Several forms of spectroscopy rely on the unique nuclear properties of specific isotopes, both radioactive and stable. For example, nuclear magnetic resonance (NMR) spectroscopy can be used only for isotopes with a nonzero nuclear spin. The most common nuclides used with NMR spectroscopy are ^{1}H, ^{2}D, ^{15}N, ^{13}C, and ^{31}P.
- Mössbauer spectroscopy also relies on the nuclear transitions of specific isotopes, such as ^{57}Fe.
- Radionuclides also have important uses. Nuclear power and nuclear weapons development require relatively large quantities of specific isotopes. Nuclear medicine and radiation oncology utilize radioisotopes respectively for medical diagnosis and treatment.

== See also ==
- Abundance of the chemical elements
- Bainbridge mass spectrometer
- Geotraces
- Isotope hydrology
- Isotopomer
- Nuclear isomer
- List of nuclides
- List of particles
- Mass spectrometry
- Reference materials for stable isotope analysis
- Table of nuclides
