= Radiogenic nuclide =

Nuclide produced by radioactive conversion from other nuclide

A radiogenic nuclide is a nuclide that is produced by a process of radioactive decay. It may itself be radioactive (a radionuclide) or stable (a stable nuclide).

Radiogenic nuclides (more commonly referred to as radiogenic isotopes) form some of the most important tools in geology. They are used in two principal ways:

1. In comparison with the quantity of the radioactive 'parent isotope' in a system, the quantity of the radiogenic 'daughter product' is used as a radiometric dating tool (e.g. uranium–lead geochronology).
2. In comparison with the quantity of a non-radiogenic isotope of the same element, the quantity of the radiogenic isotope is used to define its isotopic signature (e.g. ^{206}Pb/^{204}Pb). This technique is discussed in more detail under the heading isotope geochemistry.

== Examples ==
Some naturally occurring isotopes are entirely radiogenic, but all those are radioactive isotopes, with half-lives too short to have occurred primordially and still exist today. Thus, they are only present as radiogenic daughters of either ongoing decay processes, or else cosmogenic (cosmic ray induced) processes that produce them in nature freshly. A few others are naturally produced by nucleogenic processes (natural nuclear reactions of other types, such as neutron absorption).

For radiogenic isotopes that decay slowly enough, or that are stable isotopes, a primordial fraction is always present, since all sufficiently long-lived and stable isotopes do in fact naturally occur primordially. An additional fraction of some of these isotopes may also occur radiogenically.

Lead is perhaps the best example of a partly radiogenic substance, as all four of its stable isotopes (^{204}Pb, ^{206}Pb, ^{207}Pb, and ^{208}Pb) are present primordially, in known and fixed ratios. However, ^{204}Pb is only present primordially, while the other three isotopes may also occur as radiogenic decay products of uranium and thorium. Specifically, ^{206}Pb is formed from ^{238}U, ^{207}Pb from ^{235}U, and ^{208}Pb from ^{232}Th. In rocks that contain uranium and thorium, the excess amounts of the three heavier lead isotopes allows the rocks to be "dated", thus providing a time estimate for when the rock solidified and the mineral held the ratio of isotopes fixed and in place.

Another notable radiogenic nuclide is argon-40, formed from radioactive potassium. Almost all the argon in the Earth's atmosphere is radiogenic, whereas primordial argon is argon-36.

Some nitrogen-14 is radiogenic, coming from the decay of carbon-14 (half-life around 5700 years), but the carbon-14 was formed some time earlier from nitrogen-14 by the action of cosmic rays.

Other important examples of radiogenic elements are radon and helium, both of which form during the decay of heavier elements in bedrock. Radon is entirely radiogenic, since it has too short a half-life to have occurred primordially. Helium, however, occurs in the crust of the Earth primordially, since both helium-3 and helium-4 are stable, and small amounts were trapped in the crust of the Earth as it formed. Helium-3 is almost entirely primordial (a small amount is formed by natural nuclear reactions in the crust). Helium-3 can also be produced as the decay product of tritium (^{3}H) which is a product of some nuclear reactions, including ternary fission. The global supply of helium (which occurs in gas wells as well as the atmosphere) is mainly (about 90%–99%) radiogenic, as shown by its factor of 10 to 100 times enrichment in radiogenic helium-4 relative to the primordial ratio of helium-4 to helium-3. This latter ratio is known from extraterrestrial sources, such as some Moon rocks and meteorites, which are relatively free of parental sources for helium-3 and helium-4.

As noted in the case of lead-204, a radiogenic nuclide is often not radioactive. In this case, if its precursor nuclide has a half-life too short to have survived from primordial times, then the parent nuclide will be gone, and known now entirely by a relative excess of its stable daughter. In practice, this occurs for all radionuclides with half-lives less than about 50 to 100 million years. Such nuclides are formed in supernovas, but are known as extinct radionuclides, since they are not seen directly on the Earth today.

An example of an extinct radionuclide is iodine-129; it decays to xenon-129, a stable isotope of xenon which appears in excess relative to other xenon isotopes. It is found in meteorites that condensed from the primordial Solar System dust cloud and trapped primordial iodine-129 (half-life 15.7 million years) sometime in a relative short period (probably less than 20 million years) between the iodine-129's creation in a supernova, and the formation of the Solar System by condensation of this dust. The trapped iodine-129 now appears as a relative excess of xenon-129. Iodine-129 was the first extinct radionuclide to be inferred, in 1960. Others are aluminium-26 (also inferred from extra magnesium-26 found in meteorites), and iron-60.

== Radiogenic nuclides used in geology ==
The following table lists some of the most important radiogenic isotope systems used in geology, in order of decreasing half-life of the radioactive parent isotope. The values given for half-life and decay constant are the current consensus values in the Isotope Geology community.

** indicates ultimate decay product of a series.

Units used in this table
Gyr = gigayear = 10^{9} years
Myr = megayear = 10^{6} years
kyr = kiloyear = 10^{3} years

Parent nuclide	Daughter nuclide	Decay constant (yr^{−1})	Half-life
^{190}Pt	^{186}Os	1.477 ×10^{−12}	483 Gyr
^{147}Sm	^{143}Nd	6.54 ×10^{−12}	106 Gyr
^{87}Rb	^{87}Sr	1.402 ×10^{−11}	49.44 Gyr
^{187}Re	^{187}Os	1.666 ×10^{−11}	41.6 Gyr
^{176}Lu	^{176}Hf	1.867 ×10^{−11}	37.1 Gyr
^{232}Th	^{208}Pb**	4.9475 ×10^{−11}	14.01 Gyr
^{40}K	^{40}Ar	5.81 ×10^{−11}	11.93 Gyr
^{238}U	^{206}Pb**	1.55125 ×10^{−10}	4.468 Gyr
^{40}K	^{40}Ca	4.962 ×10^{−10}	1.397 Gyr
^{235}U	^{207}Pb**	9.8485 ×10^{−10}	0.7038 Gyr
^{129}I	^{129}Xe	4.3 ×10^{−8}	16 Myr
^{10}Be	^{10}B	4.6 ×10^{−7}	1.5 Myr
^{26}Al	^{26}Mg	9.9 ×10^{−7}	0.70 Myr
^{36}Cl	^{36}Ar (98%)^{36}S (2%)	2.24 ×10^{−6}	310 kyr
^{234}U	^{230}Th	2.826 ×10^{−6}	245.25 kyr
^{230}Th	^{226}Ra	9.1577 ×10^{−6}	75.69 kyr
^{231}Pa	^{227}Ac	2.116 ×10^{−5}	32.76 kyr
^{14}C	^{14}N	1.2097 ×10^{−4}	5730 yr
^{226}Ra	^{222}Rn	4.33 ×10^{−4}	1600 yr

== Radiogenic heating ==
Radiogenic heating occurs as a result of the release of heat energy from radioactive decay during the production of radiogenic nuclides. Along with primordial heat (resulting from planetary accretion), radiogenic heating occurring in the mantle and crust make up the two main sources of heat in the Earth's interior. Most of the radiogenic heating in the Earth results from the decay of the daughter nuclei in the decay chains of uranium-238 and thorium-232, and potassium-40. Radiogenic heating is of serious concern in the management of radioactive wastes, and is expected to significantly raise the temperature of a deep geological repository for the long term disposal of high-level wastes.

== See also ==
- Geoneutrino
- Radiometric dating
- Stable nuclide
