= Isobar (nuclide) =

Atoms of different elements with the same number of nucleons

In this chart of nuclides, isobars occur along diagonal lines running from the lower right to upper left. The line of beta stability includes the observationally stable nuclides shown in black; disconnected 'islands' are a consequence of the Mattauch isobar rule.

Isobars are atoms (nuclides) of different chemical elements that have the same number of nucleons. Correspondingly, isobars differ in atomic number (or number of protons) but have the same mass number. An example of a series of isobars is ^{40}S, ^{40}Cl, ^{40}Ar, ^{40}K, and ^{40}Ca. While the nuclei of these nuclides all contain 40 nucleons, they contain varying numbers of protons and neutrons.

The term "isobars" (originally "isobares") for nuclides was suggested by British chemist Alfred Walter Stewart in 1918. It is derived from Greek ἴσος (isos) 'equal' and βάρος (baros) 'weight'.

== Mass ==
The same mass number implies neither the same mass of nuclei, nor equal atomic masses of corresponding nuclides. From the Weizsäcker formula for the mass of a nucleus:

$$m(A,Z) = Z m_p + N m_n - a_{V} A + a_{S} A^{2/3} + a_{C} \frac{Z^2}{A^{1/3}} + a_{A} \frac{(N - Z)^{2}}{A} - \delta(A,Z)$$

where mass number A equals to the sum of atomic number Z and number of neutrons N, and m_{p}, m_{n}, a_{V}, a_{S}, a_{C}, a_{A} are constants, one can see that the mass depends on Z and N non-linearly, even for a constant mass number. For odd A, it is admitted that δ = 0 and the mass dependence on Z is convex (or on N or N − Z, it does not matter for a constant A). This explains that beta decay is energetically favorable for neutron-rich nuclides, and positron decay is favorable for strongly neutron-deficient nuclides. Both decay modes do not change the mass number, hence an original nucleus and its daughter nucleus are isobars. In both aforementioned cases, a heavier nucleus decays to its lighter isobar.

For even A the δ term has the form:

$$\delta(A,Z) = (-1)^Z a_P A^{-\frac{1}{2}}$$

where a_{P} is another constant. This term, subtracted from the mass expression above, is positive for even-even nuclei and negative for odd-odd nuclei. This means that even-even nuclei, which do not have a strong neutron excess or neutron deficiency, have higher binding energy than their odd-odd isobar neighbors. It implies that even-even nuclei are (relatively) lighter and more stable. The difference is especially strong for small A. This effect is also predicted (qualitatively) by other nuclear models and has important consequences.

== Stability ==
The Mattauch isobar rule states that if two adjacent elements on the periodic table have isotopes of the same mass number, at least one of these isobars must be a radionuclide (radioactive). In cases of three isobars of sequential elements where the first and last are stable (this is often the case for even-even nuclides, see above), branched decay of the middle isobar may occur. For instance, radioactive iodine-126 has almost equal probabilities for two decay modes: positron emission, leading to tellurium-126, and beta emission, leading to xenon-126.

No observationally stable isobars exist for mass numbers 5 (decays to helium-4 plus a proton or neutron), 8 (decays to two helium-4 nuclei), 147, 151, as well as for 209 and above (noting primordial but not stable ^{147}Sm, ^{151}Eu, and ^{209}Bi). Two observationally stable isobars exist for 36, 40, 46, 50, 54, 58, 64, 70, 74, 80, 84, 86, 92, 94, 96, 98, 102, 104, 106, 108, 110, 112, 114, 120, 122, 123, 124, 126, 132, 134, 136, 138, 142, 154, 156, 158, 160, 162, 164, 168, 170, 176, 180 (including a meta state), 192, 196, 198 and 204.

In theory, no two stable nuclides have the same mass number (since no two nuclides that have the same mass number are both stable to beta decay and double beta decay), and no stable nuclides exist for mass numbers 5, 8, 143–155, 160–162, and ≥ 165, since in theory, the beta-decay stable nuclides for these mass numbers can undergo alpha decay.

== See also ==
- Isotopes (nuclides having the same number of protons)
- Isotones (nuclides having the same number of neutrons)
- Nuclear isomers (different excited states of the same nuclide)
- Magic number (physics)
- Electron capture

== Bibliography ==
Sprawls, Perry (1993). "5 – Characteristics and Structure of Matter". Physical Principles of Medical Imaging (2 ed.). Madison, WI: Medical Physics Publishing. ISBN 0-8342-0309-X.
