= Carbon-12 =

Isotope of Carbon

General
- Symbol: ^{12}C
- Names: carbon-12
- Protons (Z): 6
- Neutrons (N): 6

Nuclide data
- Natural abundance: 98.93%
- Isotope mass: 12 Da
- Spin: 0
- Excess energy: 0.0 keV
- Nuclear binding energy: 92161.753±0.014 keV
- Parent isotopes: ^{12}N^{12}B

Carbon-12 (^{12}C) is the most abundant of the two stable isotopes of carbon (carbon-13 being the other), amounting to 98.93% of element carbon on Earth; its abundance is due to the triple-alpha process by which it is created in stars. Carbon-12 is of particular importance in its use as the standard from which atomic masses of all nuclides are measured, thus, its atomic mass is exactly 12 daltons by definition. Carbon-12 is composed of 6 protons, 6 neutrons, and 6 electrons.

See carbon-13 for means of separating the two isotopes, thereby enriching both.

== History ==
Before 1959, both the IUPAP and IUPAC used oxygen to define the mole; the chemists defining the mole as the number of atoms of oxygen which had mass 16 g, the physicists using a similar definition but with the oxygen-16 isotope only. The two organizations agreed in 1959–60 to define the mole as follows.

Mole is the amount of substance of a system which contains as many elementary entities as there are atoms in 12 gram of carbon 12; its symbol is "mol".

This was adopted by the CIPM (International Committee for Weights and Measures) in 1967, and in 1971, it was adopted by the 14th CGPM (General Conference on Weights and Measures).

In 1961, the isotope carbon-12 was selected to replace oxygen as the standard relative to which the atomic weights of all the other elements are measured, consistently with the above definition of the mole.

In 1980, the CIPM clarified the above definition, defining that the carbon-12 atoms are unbound and in their ground state.

In 2018, IUPAC specified the mole as exactly 6.02214076×10^{23} "elementary entities". The number of moles in 12 grams of carbon-12 became a matter of experimental determination.

== Hoyle state ==
The Hoyle state and possible decay ways

The Hoyle state is an excited, spin-0, resonant state of carbon-12. It is produced via the triple-alpha process and was predicted to exist by Fred Hoyle in 1954. The existence of this 7.7 MeV resonance is essential for the nucleosynthesis of carbon in helium-burning stars and predicts an amount of carbon production which matches observations. The existence of the Hoyle state has been confirmed experimentally, but its precise properties are still being investigated.

The Hoyle state is populated when a helium-4 nucleus fuses with a beryllium-8 nucleus in a high-temperature (10^{8} K) environment with densely concentrated (10^{5} g/cm^{3}) helium. As a consequence of the short half-life of ^{8}Be, two helium nuclei fusing into it must be followed within ~10^{−16} seconds by a third, forming carbon. The Hoyle state also is a short-lived resonance with a half-life of 2.4×10^{−16} s; it primarily decays back into its three constituent alpha particles, though 0.0413% of decays (or 1 in 2421.3) occur by emission of gamma rays into the ground state of ^{12}C.

In 2011, an ab initio calculation of the low-lying states of carbon-12 found (in addition to the ground and excited spin-2 state) a resonance with all of the properties of the Hoyle state.

== See also ==
- Avogadro constant
- Carbon-11
- Carbon-13
- Carbon-14
- Isotopes of carbon
- Isotopically pure diamond
- Mole (unit)

Lighter: carbon-11	Carbon-12 is an isotope of carbon	Heavier: carbon-13
Decay product of: boron-12, nitrogen-12	Decay chain of carbon-12	Decays to: stable
