= Running total =

Summation of numbers by accumulation

A running total or rolling total is the summation of a sequence of numbers which is updated each time a new number is added to the sequence, by adding the value of the new number to the previous running total. Another term for it is partial sum.

The purposes of a running total are twofold. First, it allows the total to be stated at any point in time without having to sum the entire sequence each time. Second, it can save having to record the sequence itself, if the particular numbers are not individually important.

== Method ==
Consider the sequence (5, 8, 3, 2). What is the total of this sequence?

Answer: 5 + 8 + 3 + 2 = 18. This is arrived at by simple summation of the sequence.

Now we insert the number 6 at the end of the sequence to get (5, 8, 3, 2, 6). What is the total of that sequence?

Answer: 5 + 8 + 3 + 2 + 6 = 24. This is arrived at by simple summation of the sequence. But if we regarded 18 as the running total, we need only add 6 to 18 to get 24. So, 18 was, and 24 now is, the running total. In fact, we would not even need to know the sequence at all, but simply add 6 to 18 to get the new running total; as each new number is added, we get a new running total.

The same method will also work with subtraction, but in that case it is not strictly speaking a total (which implies summation) but a running difference; not to be confused with a delta. This is used, for example, when scoring the game of darts. Similarly one can multiply instead of add to get the running product.

== Use ==
The concept of a running total is easily understood. It is common in many everyday uses. For example, most cash registers display a running total of the purchases so far rung in. By the end of the transaction this will, of course, be the total of all the goods. Similarly, the machine may keep a running total of all transactions made, so that at any point in time the total can be checked against the amount in the till, even though the machine has no memory of past transactions.

Typically many games of all kinds use running totals for scoring; the actual values of past events in the sequence are not important, only the current score, that is to say, the running total.

Tabulating machines had dedicated registers that could [only] accumulate running totals of numbers in preselected columns and display or print them.

It is trivial for computers to keep running totals in variables or registers. The central processing unit of computers for many years had one general-purpose register called the accumulator. Most arithmetic operations stored their results into this one register. This accumulator, essentially, kept a running total; that is, it "accumulated" the results of individual calculations.

A betting accumulator is the running product of the outcomes of several bets in sequence.

== See also ==
- Moving average a.k.a. running average
- Prefix sum
