= Carbon-13 =

Less abundant (~1%) stable isotope of carbon

General
- Symbol: ^{13}C
- Names: carbon-13
- Protons (Z): 6
- Neutrons (N): 7

Nuclide data
- Natural abundance: 1.07%
- Isotope mass: 13.003354835 Da
- Spin: −1/2

Carbon-13 (^{13}C) is a natural, stable isotope of carbon with a nucleus containing six protons, six electrons, and seven neutrons. It constitutes about 1.07% of natural carbon and is one of the so-called environmental isotopes.

== Detection by mass spectrometry ==
A mass spectrum of an organic compound will usually contain a small peak of one mass unit greater than the apparent molecular ion peak (M) of the whole molecule. This is known as the M+1 peak and comes from the few molecules that contain a ^{13}C atom in place of a ^{12}C. A molecule containing one carbon atom will be expected to have an M+1 peak of approximately 1.1% of the size of the M peak, as 1.1% of the molecules will have a ^{13}C rather than a ^{12}C. Similarly, a molecule containing two carbon atoms will be expected to have an M+1 peak of approximately 2.2% of the size of the M peak, as there is double the previous likelihood that any molecule will contain a ^{13}C atom.

In the above, the mathematics and chemistry have been simplified. However it can be used effectively to give the number of carbon atoms for small- to medium-sized organic molecules. In the following formula, the result should be rounded to the nearest integer:

$$C = \frac{100Y}{1.1X}$$,

where C = number of C atoms, X = amplitude of the M ion peak, and Y = amplitude of the M +1 ion peak.

^{13}C-enriched compounds are used in the research of metabolic processes by means of mass spectrometry. Such compounds are safe because they are non-radioactive. In addition, ^{13}C is used to quantify proteins (quantitative proteomics). One important application is in stable isotope labeling by amino acids in cell culture (SILAC). ^{13}C-enriched compounds are used in medical diagnostic tests such as the urea breath test. Analysis in these tests is usually of the ratio of ^{13}C to ^{12}C by isotope ratio mass spectrometry.

The ratio of ^{13}C to ^{12}C is slightly higher in plants employing C4 carbon fixation than in plants employing C3 carbon fixation. Because the different isotope ratios for the two kinds of plants propagate through the food chain, it is possible to determine whether the principal diet of a human or other animal consists primarily of C3 plants or C4 plants by measuring the isotopic signature of their collagen and other tissues.

== Uses in science ==
Compilation of carbon-13 levels from world-wide excavations.

Due to differential uptake in plants as well as marine carbonates of ^{13}C, it is possible to use these isotopic signatures in earth science. Biological processes preferentially take up the lower mass isotope through kinetic fractionation. In aqueous geochemistry, by analyzing the δ^{13}C value of carbonaceous material found in surface and ground waters, the source of the water can be identified. This is because atmospheric, carbonate, and plant derived δ^{13}C values all differ. In biology, the ratio of carbon-13 and carbon-12 isotopes in plant tissues is different depending on the type of plant photosynthesis and this can be used, for example, to determine which types of plants were consumed by animals. Greater carbon-13 concentrations indicate stomatal limitations, which can provide information on plant behaviour during drought. Tree ring analysis of carbon isotopes can be used to retrospectively understand forest photosynthesis and how it is impacted by drought.

In geology, the ^{13}C/^{12}C ratio is used to identify the layer in sedimentary rock created at the time of the Permian extinction 252 Mya when the ratio changed abruptly by 1%. More information about usage of ^{13}C/^{12}C ratio in science can be found in the article about isotopic signatures.

Carbon-13 has a non-zero spin quantum number of 1/2, and hence allows the structure of carbon-containing substances to be investigated using carbon-13 nuclear magnetic resonance.

The carbon-13 urea breath test is a safe and highly accurate diagnostic tool to detect the presence of Helicobacter pylori infection in the stomach. The urea breath test utilizing carbon-13 is preferred to carbon-14 for certain vulnerable populations due to its non-radioactive nature.

== Production ==
Bulk carbon-13 for commercial use, e.g. in chemical synthesis, is enriched from its natural 1.1% abundance. Carbon-13 can be separated from the major carbon-12 isotope via techniques such as thermal diffusion, chemical exchange, gas diffusion, laser, cryogenic distillation, or chemical exchange of CO_{2} , however, only cryogenic distillation of methane (boiling point −161.5 °C) or carbon monoxide (b.p. −191.5 °C) is economically feasible for industrial production as of 2010. Industrial carbon-13 production plants represent a substantial investment: greater than 100-meter-tall (330 ft) cryogenic distillation columns are needed to separate the carbon-12 or carbon-13 containing compounds. The largest reported commercial carbon-13 production plant in the world as of 2014 has an annual production capability of ~400 kg of carbon-13. In contrast, a 1969 carbon monoxide cryogenic distillation pilot plant at Los Alamos Scientific Laboratories could produce 4 kg of carbon-13 annually.

== See also ==
- Carbon-12
- Isotopes of carbon
- Isotope fractionation

== Notes ==
| Lighter: carbon-12 | Carbon-13 is an isotope of carbon | Heavier: carbon-14 |
| Decay product of: boron-13, nitrogen-13 | Decay chain of carbon-13 | Decays to: stable |
