= Radionuclide =

Atom that has excess nuclear energy, making it unstable

Chart of known nuclides as of 2013. The vast majority are radionuclides. (Note: some observationally stable nuclides, such as tungsten's, are marked as radionuclides, others are not.)

A radionuclide (radioactive nuclide, radioisotope, radioactive isotope, or unstable isotope) is a nuclide that is unstable and known to undergo radioactive decay into a different nuclide, which may be another radionuclide (see decay chain) or be stable.

Radioactive decay is a random process at the level of single atoms: it is impossible to predict when one particular atom will decay. For a collection of atoms of a single nuclide, their average decay rate can be measured, and its half-life (t_{1/2}) calculated. Half-lives vary by 55 orders of magnitude and have no known limits.

All chemical elements have radionuclides - even the lightest, hydrogen, has a well-known radionuclide, tritium (though helium, lithium, and boron have none with half-life over a second). Elements heavier than lead (Z > 82), and the elements technetium and promethium, have only radionuclides and do not exist in stable forms, though bismuth can be treated as stable with the half-life of its natural isotope being over a trillion times longer than the current age of the universe.

Radiation emitted by radionuclides is almost always ionizing radiation and exposure above a certain level can cause damage to living organisms.

== Production and effects ==
Artificial production methods of radionuclides include neutron sources such as nuclear reactors, as well as particle accelerators such as cyclotrons.

The radiation from radionuclides generally has a harmful effect on organisms including humans, although low levels of exposure occur naturally. The degree of harm depends on the nature and extent of the radiation (alpha, beta, gamma, or neutron), the amount and nature of exposure (close contact, inhalation or ingestion), and the element's biochemical properties (toxicity). Increased risk of cancer is unavoidable, and worse cases induce cancer, chronic radiation syndrome or acute radiation syndrome. Radionuclides can be used as weapons by the fallout effects of nuclear weapons and by radiological weapons.

Radionuclides are used in nuclear medicine for both diagnosis and treatment. The term “theranostics” (or “theragnostics”) refers to the combination of diagnosis and therapy of a disease within a single medical procedure or technique. An imaging tracer made with radionuclides is a radioactive tracer. Radionuclide therapy is a form of radiotherapy. A pharmaceutical drug made with radionuclides is called a radiopharmaceutical.

== Overview ==
Radionuclides occur naturally and are artificially produced in nuclear reactors, cyclotrons, particle accelerators or radionuclide generators. There are 735 known radionuclides with half-lives longer than an hour (see list of nuclides); 35 of those are primordial radionuclides whose presence on Earth has persisted from its formation, and another 62 are detectable in nature, continuously produced either as daughter products of primordial radionuclides or by cosmic radiation. More than 2400 radionuclides have half-lives less than 60 minutes. Most of those are only produced artificially, and have very short half-lives. For comparison, there are 251 stable nuclides.

=== Natural ===
On Earth, naturally occurring radionuclides fall into three categories: primordial radionuclides, secondary radionuclides, and cosmogenic radionuclides.

- Radionuclides are produced in stellar nucleosynthesis and supernova explosions along with stable nuclides. Most decay quickly, but some can be observed astronomically and can play a part in understanding astrophysical processes. Primordial radionuclides, such as uranium and thorium, still exist because their half-lives are so long (>100 million years) that the Earth's initial content has not yet completely decayed. Some radionuclides have half-lives so long (many times the age of the universe) that decay has only recently been detected, and for most practical purposes they can be considered stable, most notably bismuth-209: detection of this decay meant that bismuth was no longer considered stable. It is possible that decay may be observed in other nuclides now considered stable, adding to the list of primordial radionuclides.
- Secondary radionuclides are radiogenic isotopes derived from the decay of primordial radionuclides. They have shorter half-lives than primordial radionuclides. They arise in the decay chain of the primordial isotopes thorium-232, uranium-238, and uranium-235 - such as the natural isotopes of polonium and radium - some are also produced by natural fission and other nucleogenic processes.
- Cosmogenic isotopes, such as carbon-14, are present because they are continually being formed on Earth, typically in the atmosphere, due to the action of cosmic rays.

Many of these radionuclides exist only in trace amounts in nature, including all cosmogenic nuclides. Secondary radionuclides in a decay chain will occur in proportion to their half-lives, so short-lived ones will be very rare. For example, polonium can be found in uranium ores at a concentration about 1 part 10^{10} of uranium (0.1 mg per metric ton) by calculating the ratio of half-lives of polonium-210 to uranium-238, its ultimate parent.

=== Nuclear fission ===
Radionuclides are produced as an unavoidable result of nuclear fission and nuclear explosions. The process of nuclear fission creates a wide range of fission products, most of which are radionuclides. Further radionuclides are created from irradiation of the nuclear fuel (creating a range of actinides) and of the surrounding structures, yielding activation products. This complex mixture of radionuclides with different chemistries and radioactivity makes handling nuclear waste and dealing with nuclear fallout particularly problematic.

=== Synthetic ===
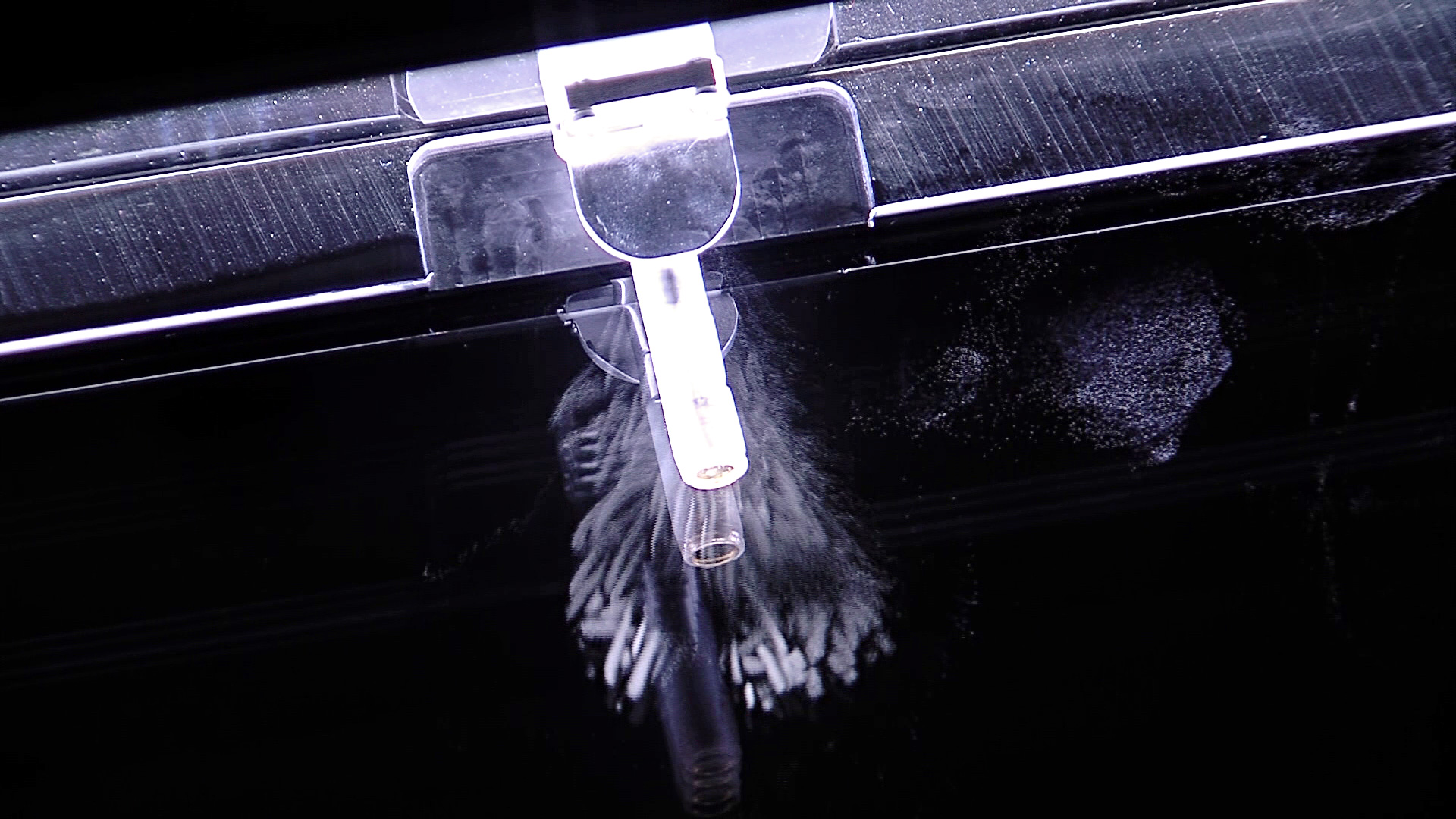
Americium-241 emitting alpha particles inserted into a cloud chamber

Synthetic radionuclides are created in nuclear reactors or by particle accelerators (not necessarily on purpose) or as decay products of such:

- As well as being extracted from nuclear waste, radioisotopes can be produced deliberately with nuclear reactors, exploiting the high flux of neutrons present. These neutrons activate elements placed within the reactor. A typical product from a nuclear reactor is iridium-192, from activation of iridium targets. The elements that have a large propensity to take up neutrons in the reactor are said to have a high neutron cross-section, but even at low cross-sections this process is generally economical.
- Particle accelerators such as cyclotrons accelerate particles to bombard a target to produce radionuclides. Cyclotrons accelerate (most often) protons at a target to produce positron-emitting radionuclides, e.g. fluorine-18.
- Radionuclide generators, standard for many medical isotopes, contain a parent radionuclide that decays to produce a shorter-lived radioactive daughter. A typical example is the technetium-99m generator, which employs molybdenum-99 produced in a reactor.

== Uses ==
Radionuclides are used in two major ways: either for their radiation alone (irradiation, nuclear batteries) or for the combination of chemical properties and their radiation (tracers, biopharmaceuticals). For scientific study they may be used for their chemical properties alone when there is no stable form of that element.

- In biology, radionuclides (most often of carbon) can serve as radioactive tracers because they are chemically very similar to the nonradioactive nuclides, so most chemical, biological, and ecological processes treat them in a nearly identical way. One can then examine the result with a radiation detector, such as a Geiger counter, to determine where the provided atoms were incorporated. For example, one might culture plants in an environment in which the carbon dioxide contained radioactive carbon; then the parts of the plant that incorporate atmospheric carbon would be radioactive. Radionuclides can be used to monitor processes such as DNA replication or amino acid transport.
- In physics and biology radionuclide X-ray fluorescence (conventional X-ray sources may also be used) is used to determine chemical composition of the compound. Radiation from a radionuclide source hits the sample and excites characteristic X-rays in the sample. This radiation is registered and the chemical composition of the sample can be determined from the analysis of the measured spectrum. By measuring the energy of the characteristic radiation lines, it is possible to determine the proton number of the chemical element that emits the radiation, and by measuring the number of emitted photons, it is possible to determine the concentration of individual chemical elements.
- In nuclear medicine, radioisotopes are used for diagnosis, treatment, and research. Radioactive chemical tracers emitting gamma rays or positrons can provide diagnostic information about internal anatomy and the functioning of specific organs, including the human brain. This is used in some forms of tomography: single-photon emission computed tomography and positron emission tomography (PET) scanning and Cherenkov luminescence imaging. Radioisotopes are also a method of treatment in hemopoietic forms of tumors; the success for treatment of solid tumors has been limited. More powerful gamma sources sterilise syringes and other medical equipment.
- In food preservation, radiation is used to stop the sprouting of root crops after harvesting, to kill parasites and pests, and to control the ripening of stored fruit and vegetables. Food irradiation usually uses strong gamma emitters like cobalt-60 or caesium-137.
- In industry, and in mining, radiation from radionuclides may be used to examine welds, to detect leaks, to study the rate of wear, erosion and corrosion of metals, and for on-stream analysis of a wide range of minerals and fuels.
- In spacecraft, radionuclides are used to provide power and heat, notably through radioisotope thermoelectric generators (RTGs) and radioisotope heater units (RHUs).
- In particle physics, radionuclides help discover new physics (physics beyond the Standard Model) by measuring the energy and momentum of their beta decay products (for example, neutrinoless double beta decay and the search for weakly interacting massive particles).
- In ecology, radionuclides are used to trace and analyze pollutants, to study the movement of surface water, and to measure water runoffs from rain and snow, as well as the flow rates of streams and rivers.
- In geology, archaeology, and paleontology, natural radionuclides are used to measure ages of rocks, minerals, and fossil materials. This is called radiometric dating.

== Examples ==
Radionuclides have a range of properties and uses:

Isotope	Z	N	half-life	DM	DE keV	Mode of formation	Comments
Tritium (^{3}H)	1	2	12.3 y	β^{−}	19	Cosmogenic	lightest radionuclide, used in artificial nuclear fusion, also used for radioluminescence and as oceanic transient tracer. Synthesized from neutron bombardment of lithium-6 or deuterium
Beryllium-10	4	6	1,387,000 y	β^{−}	556	Cosmogenic	used to examine soil erosion, soil formation from regolith, and the age of ice cores
Carbon-14	6	8	5,700 y	β^{−}	156	Cosmogenic	used for radiocarbon dating
Fluorine-18	9	9	110 min	β^{+}, EC	633/1655	Cosmogenic	positron source, synthesised for use as a medical radiotracer in PET scans.
Aluminium-26	13	13	717,000 y	β^{+}, EC	4004	Cosmogenic	exposure dating of rocks, sediment
Chlorine-36	17	19	301,000 y	β^{−}, EC	709	Cosmogenic	exposure dating of rocks, groundwater tracer
Potassium-40	19	21	1.24×10^{9} y	β^{−}, EC	1330 /1505	Primordial	used for potassium–argon dating, source of atmospheric argon, source of radiogenic heat, largest source of natural radioactivity
Calcium-41	20	21	99,400 y	EC		Cosmogenic	exposure dating of carbonate rocks
Cobalt-60	27	33	5.3 y	β^{−}	2824	Synthetic	produces high energy gamma rays, used for radiotherapy, equipment sterilisation, food irradiation
Krypton-81	36	45	229,000 y	β^{+}		Cosmogenic	groundwater dating
Strontium-90	38	52	28.8 y	β^{−}	546	Fission product	medium-lived fission product; probably most dangerous component of nuclear fallout
Technetium-99	43	56	210,000 y	β^{−}	294	Fission product	most common isotope of the lightest unstable element, most significant of long-lived fission products
Technetium-99m	43	56	6 hr	γ,IC	141	Synthetic	most commonly used medical radioisotope, used as a radioactive tracer
Iodine-129	53	76	15,700,000 y	β^{−}	194	Cosmogenic	longest lived fission product; groundwater tracer
Iodine-131	53	78	8 d	β^{−}	971	Fission product	most significant short-term health hazard from nuclear fission, used in nuclear medicine, industrial tracer
Xenon-135	54	81	9.1 h	β^{−}	1160	Fission product	strongest known "nuclear poison" (neutron-absorber), with a major effect on nuclear reactor operation.
Caesium-137	55	82	30.2 y	β^{−}	1176	Fission product	other major medium-lived fission product of concern
Gadolinium-153	64	89	240 d	EC		Synthetic	calibrating nuclear equipment, bone density screening
Bismuth-209	83	126	2.01×10^{19}y	α	3137	Primordial	long considered stable, decay only detected in 2003
Polonium-210	84	126	138 d	α	5307	Decay product	highly toxic, used in poisoning of Alexander Litvinenko
Astatine-211	85	126	7.2 h	ε, α		Synthetic	medicine
Radon-222	86	136	3.8 d	α	5590	Decay product	gas, responsible for the majority of public exposure to ionizing radiation, second most frequent cause of lung cancer
Thorium-232	90	142	1.4×10^{10} y	α	4083	Primordial	basis of thorium fuel cycle
Uranium-235	92	143	7×10^{8}y	α	4679	Primordial	fissile, main nuclear fuel
Uranium-238	92	146	4.5×10^{9} y	α	4267	Primordial	main uranium isotope
Plutonium-238	94	144	87.7 y	α	5593	Synthetic	used in radioisotope thermoelectric generators (RTGs) and radioisotope heater units as an energy source for spacecraft
Plutonium-239	94	145	24,110 y	α	5245	Synthetic	used for most modern nuclear weapons
Americium-241	95	146	432 y	α	5486	Synthetic	used in household smoke detectors as an ionising agent
Californium-252	98	154	2.64 y	α/SF	6217	Synthetic	undergoes spontaneous fission (3% of decays), making it a powerful neutron source, used as a reactor initiator and for detection devices
Lutetium-177	71	106	6.6443(9) d	β^{−}	497 (78.6 %), 384 (9.1 %), 176 (12.2 %)	Synthetic	used predominantly in targeted radionuclide therapy (TRT) against somatostatin receptor-positive gastroenteropancreatic neuroendocrine tumors (GEP-NETs)

Key: Z = atomic number; N = neutron number; DM = decay mode; DE = decay energy; EC = electron capture

=== Household smoke detectors ===
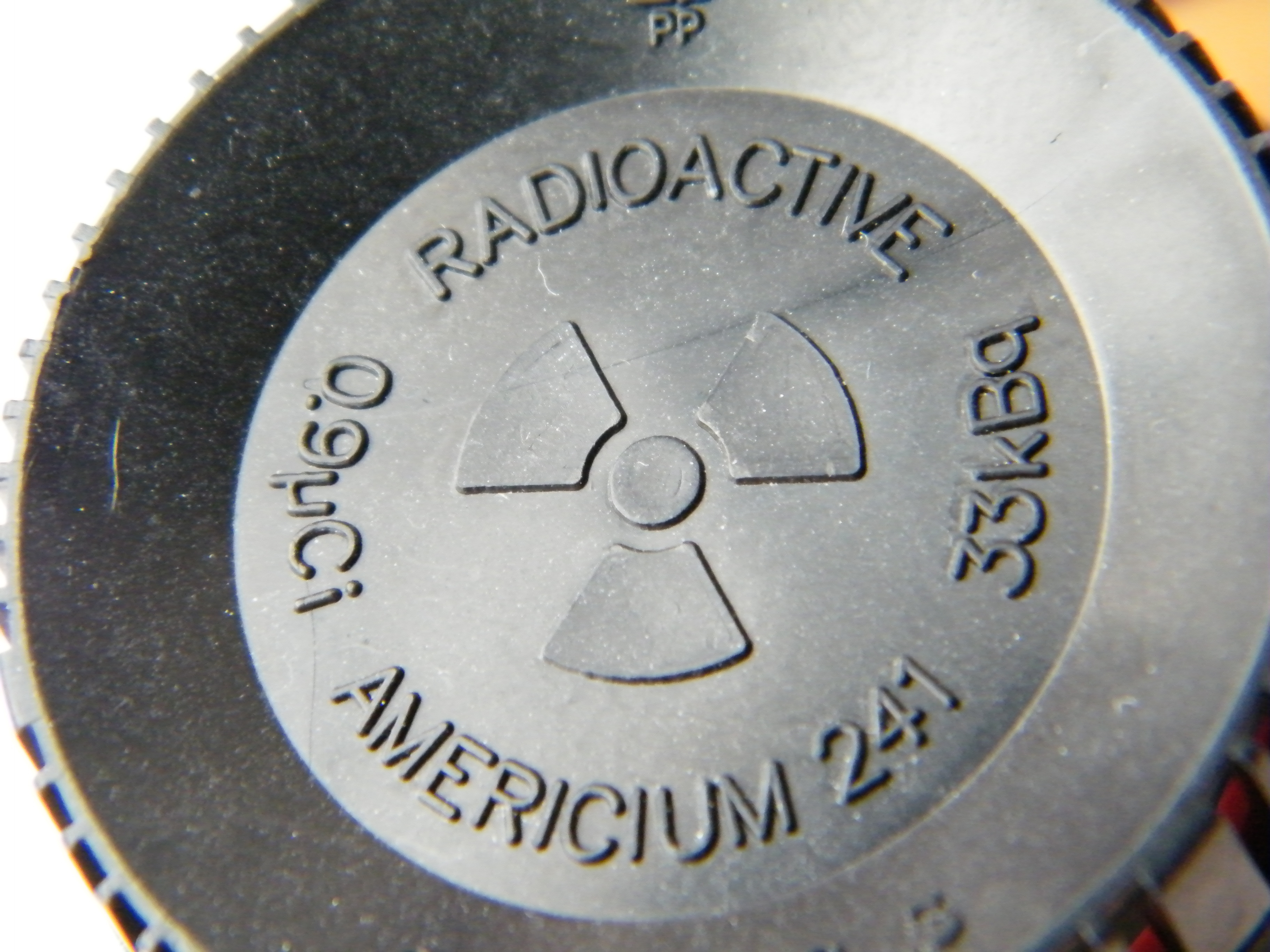
Americium-241 container in a smoke detector

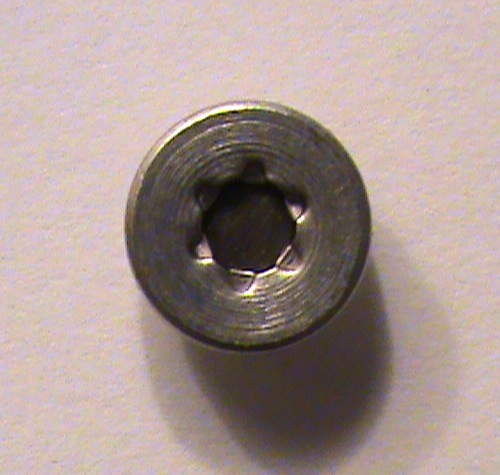
Americium-241 capsule as found in smoke detector. The circle of darker metal in the center is americium-241; the surrounding casing is aluminium.

Radionuclides are present in many homes as they are used inside the most common household smoke detectors. The radionuclide used is americium-241, which is created by bombarding plutonium with neutrons in a nuclear reactor. It decays by emitting alpha particles and gamma radiation to become neptunium-237. Smoke detectors use a very small quantity of ^{241}Am (about 0.29 micrograms per smoke detector) in the form of americium dioxide. ^{241}Am is used as it emits alpha particles which ionize the air in the detector's ionization chamber. A small electric voltage is applied to the ionized air which gives rise to a small electric current. In the presence of smoke, some of the ions are neutralized, thereby decreasing the current, which activates the detector's alarm.

== Impacts on organisms ==
Radionuclides that find their way into the environment may cause harmful effects as radioactive contamination. They can also cause damage if they are excessively used during treatment or in other ways exposed to living beings, by radiation poisoning. Potential health damage from exposure to radionuclides depends on a number of factors, and "can damage the functions of healthy tissue/organs. Radiation exposure can produce effects ranging from skin redness and hair loss, to radiation burns and acute radiation syndrome. Prolonged exposure can lead to cells being damaged and in turn lead to cancer. Signs of cancerous cells might not show up until years, or even decades, after exposure."

== Summary table for classes of nuclides, stable and radioactive ==
Following is a summary table for the list of 986 nuclides with half-lives greater than one hour. A total of 251 nuclides have never been observed to decay, and are classically considered stable. Of these, 90 are believed to be absolutely stable except to proton decay (which has never been observed), while the rest are "observationally stable" and theoretically can undergo radioactive decay with extremely long half-lives.

The remaining tabulated radionuclides have half-lives longer than 1 hour, and are well-characterized (see list of nuclides for a complete tabulation). They include 31 nuclides with measured half-lives longer than the estimated age of the universe (13.8 billion years), and another four nuclides with half-lives long enough (> 100 million years) that they are radioactive primordial nuclides, and may be detected on Earth, having survived from their presence in interstellar dust since before the formation of the Solar System, about 4.6 billion years ago. Another 60+ short-lived nuclides can be detected naturally as daughters of longer-lived nuclides or cosmic-ray products. The remaining known nuclides are known solely from artificial nuclear transmutation.

Numbers may change slightly in the future as some nuclides now classified as stable are observed to be radioactive with very long half-lives.

This is a summary table for the 986 nuclides with half-lives longer than one hour (including those that are stable), given in list of nuclides.

Stability class	Number of nuclides	Running total	Notes on running total
Theoretically stable to all but proton decay	90	90	Includes first 40 elements. Proton decay yet to be observed.
Theoretically stable to alpha decay, beta decay, isomeric transition, and double beta decay but not spontaneous fission, which is possible for "stable" nuclides ≥ niobium-93	56	146	All nuclides that are possibly completely stable (spontaneous fission has never been observed for nuclides with mass number < 232).
Energetically unstable to one or more known decay modes, but no decay yet seen. All considered "stable" until decay detected.	105	251	Total of classically stable nuclides.
Radioactive primordial nuclides	35	286	Total primordial elements include uranium, thorium, bismuth, rubidium-87, potassium-40, tellurium-128 plus all stable nuclides.
Radioactive nonprimordial, but naturally occurring on Earth	62	348	Carbon-14 (and other isotopes generated by cosmic rays) and daughters of radioactive primordial elements, such as radium and polonium, of which 32 have a half-life of greater than one hour, also long-lived fission products.
Radioactive synthetic half-life ≥ 1.0 hour). Includes most useful radiotracers.	638	986	These comprise the remainder of the list of nuclides.
Radioactive synthetic (half-life < 1.0 hour).	>2400	>3300	Includes all well-characterized synthetic nuclides.

== See also ==
- List of nuclides shows all radionuclides with half-life > 1 hour
- Hyperaccumulators table – 3 (includes organisms noted for accumulating radionuclides)
- Radioactivity in biology
- Radiometric dating
- Radionuclide cisternogram
- Uses of radioactivity in oil and gas wells
