= Neutron number =

Number of neutrons in a nuclide

This diagram shows the half-life (T_{½}) of various isotopes with Z protons and neutron number N.

The neutron number (symbol N) is the number of neutrons in a nuclide.

Atomic number (proton number) plus neutron number equals mass number: Z + N = A. The difference between the neutron number and the atomic number is known as the neutron excess: D = N − Z = A − 2Z.

Neutron number is not written explicitly in nuclide symbol notation, but can be inferred as it is the difference between the two left-hand numbers (atomic number and mass).

| Element | C: Carbon, no specific isotope |
| Isotope/Nuclide | ^{14}C: Carbon-14 specifically. |
| With atomic number | ^{14}_{6}C: Carbon-14. No more specific (carbon always has six protons) but may be more clear. |

Nuclides that have the same neutron number but different proton numbers are called isotones. This word was formed by replacing the p in isotope with n for neutron. Nuclides that have the same mass number are called isobars. Nuclides that have the same neutron excess are called isodiaphers.

Chemical properties are primarily determined by proton number, which determines which chemical element the nuclide is a member of; neutron number has only a slight influence.

Neutron number is primarily of interest for nuclear properties. For example, actinides with odd neutron number are usually fissile (fissionable with slow neutrons) while actinides with even neutron number are usually not fissile (but are fissionable with fast neutrons).

Only 58 stable nuclides have an odd neutron number, compared to 194 with an even neutron number. No odd-neutron-number isotope is the most naturally abundant isotope in its element, except for beryllium-9 (which is the only stable beryllium isotope), nitrogen-14, and platinum-195.

No stable nuclides have a neutron number of 19, 21, 35, 39, 45, 61, 89, 115, 123, or ≥ 127. There are 6 stable nuclides and one radioactive primordial nuclide with neutron number 82 (82 is the neutron number with the most stable nuclides, since it is a magic number): barium-138, lanthanum-139, cerium-140, praseodymium-141, neodymium-142, and samarium-144, as well as the radioactive primordial nuclide xenon-136, which decays by a very slow double beta process. Except 20, 50 and 82 (all these three numbers are magic numbers), all other neutron numbers have at most 4 stable nuclides (in the case of 20, there are 5 stable nuclides ^{36}S, ^{37}Cl, ^{38}Ar, ^{39}K, and ^{40}Ca, and in the case for 50, there are 5 stable nuclides: ^{86}Kr, ^{88}Sr, ^{89}Y, ^{90}Zr, and ^{92}Mo, and 1 radioactive primordial nuclide, ^{87}Rb). Most odd neutron numbers have at most one stable nuclide (exceptions are 1 (^{2}H and ^{3}He), 5 (^{9}Be and ^{10}B), 7 (^{13}C and ^{14}N), 55 (^{97}Mo and ^{99}Ru) and 107 (^{179}Hf and ^{180m}Ta)). However, some even neutron numbers also have only one stable nuclide; these numbers are 0 (^{1}H), 2 (^{4}He), 4 (^{7}Li), 84 (^{142}Ce), 86 (^{146}Nd) and 126 (^{208}Pb). The cases of 84 and 86 are special, since ^{142}Ce and ^{146}Nd are theoretically unstable to double beta decay, and the nuclides with 84 or 86 neutrons which are theoretically stable to both beta decay and double beta decay are ^{144}Nd, ^{146}Sm, and ^{148}Sm, but all three nuclides are observed to alpha decay. (In theory, no stable nuclides have neutron number 19, 21, 35, 39, 45, 61, 71, 83–91, 95, 96, and ≥ 99) Besides, no nuclides with neutron number 19, 21, 35, 39, 45, 61, 71, 89, 115, 123, 147, ... are stable to beta decay (see Beta-decay stable isobars).

Only two stable nuclides have fewer neutrons than protons: hydrogen-1 and helium-3. Hydrogen-1 has the smallest neutron number, 0.
