= Osmium =

Osmium, _{76}Os
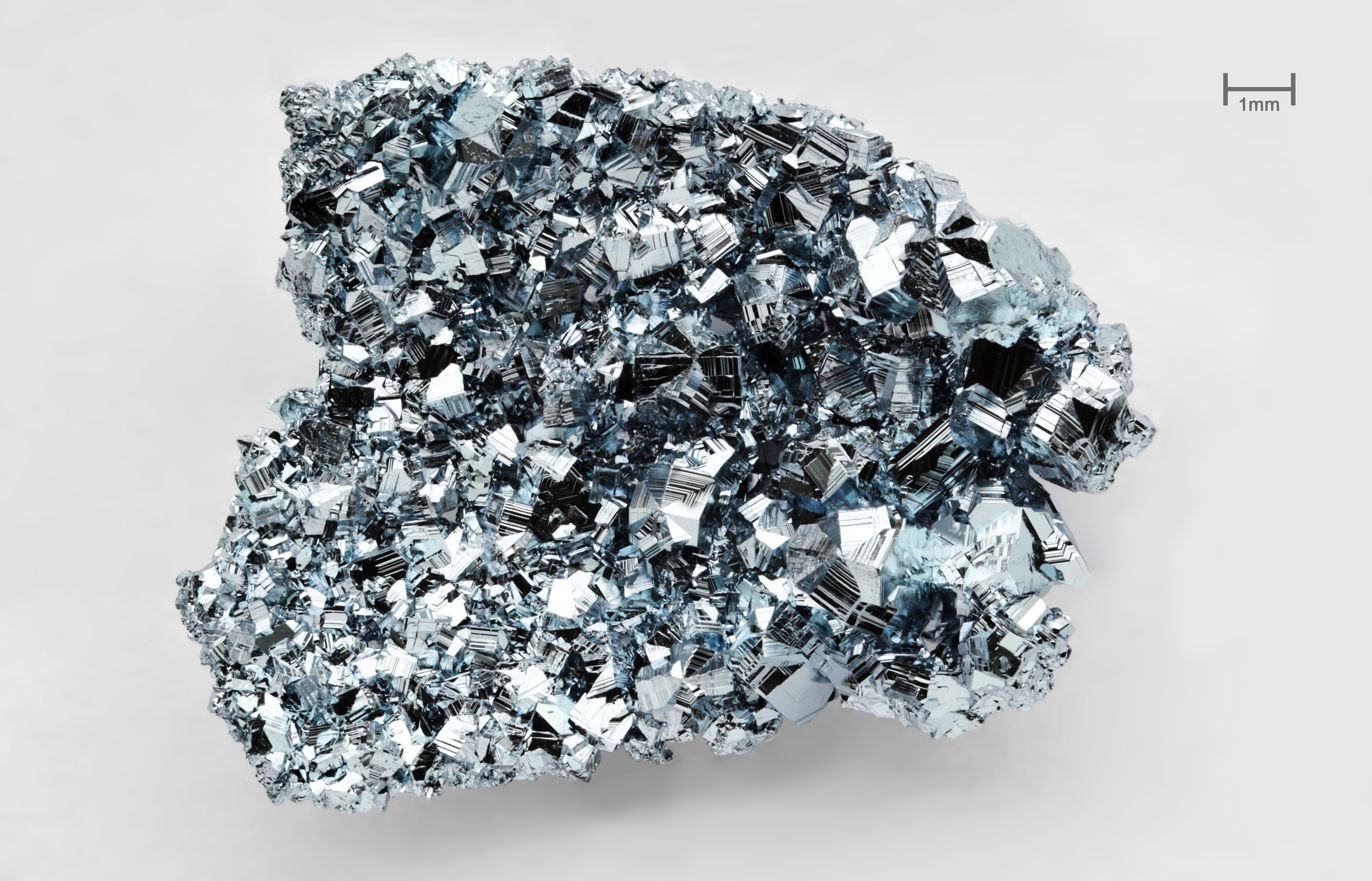

Osmium
- Pronunciation: /ˈɒzmiəm/ (OZ-mee-əm)
- Appearance: silvery, blue cast

Standard atomic weight A_{r}°(Os)
- 190.23±0.03; 190.23±0.03 (abridged)

Osmium in the periodic table
Hydrogen																															Helium
Lithium	Beryllium																									Boron	Carbon	Nitrogen	Oxygen	Fluorine	Neon
Sodium	Magnesium																									Aluminium	Silicon	Phosphorus	Sulfur	Chlorine	Argon
Potassium	Calcium															Scandium	Titanium	Vanadium	Chromium	Manganese	Iron	Cobalt	Nickel	Copper	Zinc	Gallium	Germanium	Arsenic	Selenium	Bromine	Krypton
Rubidium	Strontium															Yttrium	Zirconium	Niobium	Molybdenum	Technetium	Ruthenium	Rhodium	Palladium	Silver	Cadmium	Indium	Tin	Antimony	Tellurium	Iodine	Xenon
Caesium	Barium	Lanthanum	Cerium	Praseodymium	Neodymium	Promethium	Samarium	Europium	Gadolinium	Terbium	Dysprosium	Holmium	Erbium	Thulium	Ytterbium	Lutetium	Hafnium	Tantalum	Tungsten	Rhenium	Osmium	Iridium	Platinum	Gold	Mercury (element)	Thallium	Lead	Bismuth	Polonium	Astatine	Radon
Francium	Radium	Actinium	Thorium	Protactinium	Uranium	Neptunium	Plutonium	Americium	Curium	Berkelium	Californium	Einsteinium	Fermium	Mendelevium	Nobelium	Lawrencium	Rutherfordium	Dubnium	Seaborgium	Bohrium	Hassium	Meitnerium	Darmstadtium	Roentgenium	Copernicium	Nihonium	Flerovium	Moscovium	Livermorium	Tennessine	Oganesson
Ru
↑
Os
↓
Hs
rhenium ← osmium → iridium
- Atomic number (Z): 76
- Group: group 8
- Period: period 6
- Block: d-block
- Electron configuration: [Xe] 4f^{14} 5d^{6} 6s^{2}
- Electrons per shell: 2, 8, 18, 32, 14, 2

Physical properties
- Phase at STP: solid
- Melting point: 3306 K (3033 °C, 5491 °F)
- Boiling point: 5281 K (5008 °C, 9046 °F)
- Density (at 20° C): 22.587 g/cm^{3}
- Heat of fusion: 57.851 kJ/mol (at m.p.)
- Heat of vaporization: 378 kJ/mol
- Molar heat capacity: 24.7 J/(mol·K)
- Specific heat capacity: 129.843 J/(kg·K)
Vapor pressure
P (Pa)	1	10	100	1 k	10 k	100 k
at T (K)	3160	3423	3751	4148	4638	5256

Atomic properties
- Oxidation states: common: +4 −2, −1, 0, +1, +2, +3, +5, +6, +7, +8
- Electronegativity: Pauling scale: 2.2
- Ionization energies: 1st: 840 kJ/mol; 2nd: 1600 kJ/mol
- Atomic radius: empirical: 135 pm
- Covalent radius: 144±4 pm
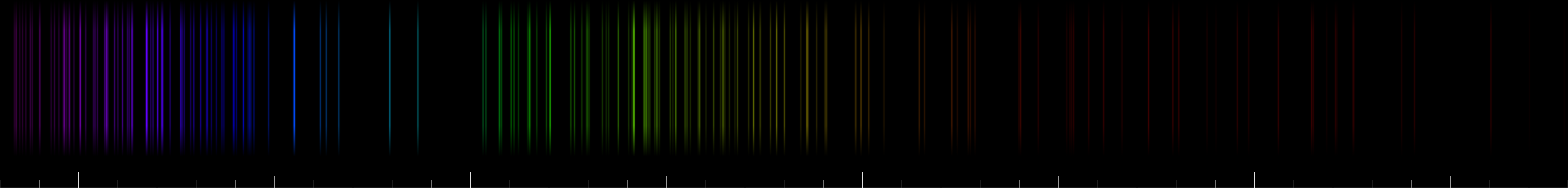
- Spectral lines of osmium

Other properties
- Natural occurrence: primordial
- Crystal structure: hexagonal close-packed (hcp) (hP2)
- Lattice constants: a = 273.42 pm c = 431.99 pm (at 20 °C)
- Thermal expansion: 4.99×10^{−6}/K (at 20 °C) (Note: The thermal expansion of Os is anisotropic: the coefficients for each crystal axis (at 20 °C) are: α_{a} = 4.57×10^{−6}/K, α_{c} = 5.85×10^{−6}/K, and α_{average} = α_{V}/3 = 4.99×10^{−6}/K.)
- Thermal conductivity: 87.6 W/(m⋅K)
- Electrical resistivity: 81.2 nΩ⋅m (at 0 °C)
- Magnetic ordering: paramagnetic
- Molar magnetic susceptibility: 11×10^{−6} cm^{3}/mol
- Young's modulus: 556 GPa
- Shear modulus: 222 GPa
- Bulk modulus: 462 GPa
- Speed of sound thin rod: 4940 m/s (at 20 °C)
- Poisson ratio: 0.25
- Mohs hardness: 7.0
- Vickers hardness: 4137 MPa
- Brinell hardness: 3920 MPa
- CAS Number: 7440-04-2

History
- Naming: after Greek osme, "a smell", for the smell of the volatile osmium tetroxide
- Discovery and first isolation: Smithson Tennant (1803)

Isotopes of osmium
Main isotopes			Decay	
Isotope	abundance	half-life (t_{1/2})	mode	product
^{184}Os	0.02%	1.12×10^{13} y	α	^{180}W
^{185}Os	synth	92.95 d	ε	^{185}Re
^{186}Os	1.59%	2.0×10^{15} y	α	^{182}W
^{187}Os	1.96%	stable		
^{188}Os	13.24%	stable		
^{189}Os	16.15%	stable		
^{190}Os	26.26%	stable		
^{191}Os	synth	14.99 d	β^{−}	^{191}Ir
^{192}Os	40.78%	stable		
^{193}Os	synth	29.83 h	β^{−}	^{193}Ir
^{194}Os	synth	6.0 y	β^{−}	^{194}Ir

Osmium (from Ancient Greek ὀσμή (osmḗ) 'smell') is a chemical element; it has symbol Os and atomic number 76. It is a hard, brittle, bluish-white transition metal in the platinum group. It was discovered in 1803 by Smithson Tennant, who named it for the characteristic smell of its volatile oxide. Osmium has the highest density of any stable element and one of the lowest abundances in the Earth's crust, where it is mainly found alongside other platinum-group metals and in ores of copper and nickel.

While its metallic applications are limited, manufacturers use alloys of osmium with platinum, iridium, and other platinum-group metals for fountain pen nib tipping, electrical contacts, and other applications that require extreme durability and hardness. Its chemical applications are more prominent, with major applications in electron microscopy and laboratory-scale production of vicinal diols.

== Characteristics ==
=== Physical properties ===
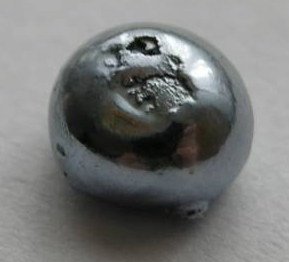
Osmium, remelted pellet

Osmium is a hard, brittle, blue-gray metal, and the densest stable element—about twice as dense as lead. The density of osmium is slightly greater than that of iridium; the two are so similar (22.587 versus 22.562 g/cm^{3} at 20 °C) that each was at one time considered to be the densest element. Only in the 1990s were measurements made accurately enough (by means of X-ray crystallography) to be certain that osmium is the denser of the two.

Osmium has a blue-gray tint. The reflectivity of single crystals of osmium is complex and strongly direction-dependent, with light in the red and near-infrared wavelengths being more strongly absorbed when polarized parallel to the c crystal axis than when polarized perpendicular to the c axis; the c-parallel polarization is also slightly more reflected in the mid-ultraviolet range. Reflectivity reaches a sharp minimum at around 1.5 eV (near-infrared) for the c-parallel polarization and at 2.0 eV (orange) for the c-perpendicular polarization, and peaks for both in the visible spectrum at around 3.0 eV (blue-violet).

Osmium remains lustrous even at high temperatures. It has a very low compressibility. Correspondingly, its bulk modulus is extremely high, reported to be between 395 and 462 GPa, which rivals that of diamond (443 GPa). The hardness of osmium is moderately high at 4 GPa. Because of its hardness, brittleness, low vapor pressure (the lowest of the platinum-group metals), and very high melting point (the fourth highest of all elements, after carbon, tungsten, and rhenium), solid osmium is difficult to machine, form, or work.

=== Chemical properties ===
Oxidation states of osmium
−2	Na_{2}[Os(CO)_{4}]
−1	K_{2}[Os_{2}(CO)_{8}]
0	Os_{3}(CO)_{12}
+1	OsI
+2	OsI_{2}
+3	OsBr_{3}
+4	OsO_{2}, OsCl_{4}
+5	OsF_{5}
+6	OsF_{6}
+7	OsOF_{5}
+8	OsO_{4}, Os(NCH_{3})_{4}

Osmium forms compounds with oxidation states ranging from −2 to +8. The most common oxidation states are +2, +3, +4, and +8. Examples of the −1 and −2 oxidation states are Na_{2}[Os_{4}(CO)_{13}] (mixed 0 and −1 oxidation states) and Na_{2}[Os(CO)_{4}], respectively; these reactive compounds are used to synthesize osmium cluster compounds. Another example of the −1 oxidation state of osmium is K_{2}[Os_{2}(CO)_{8}].

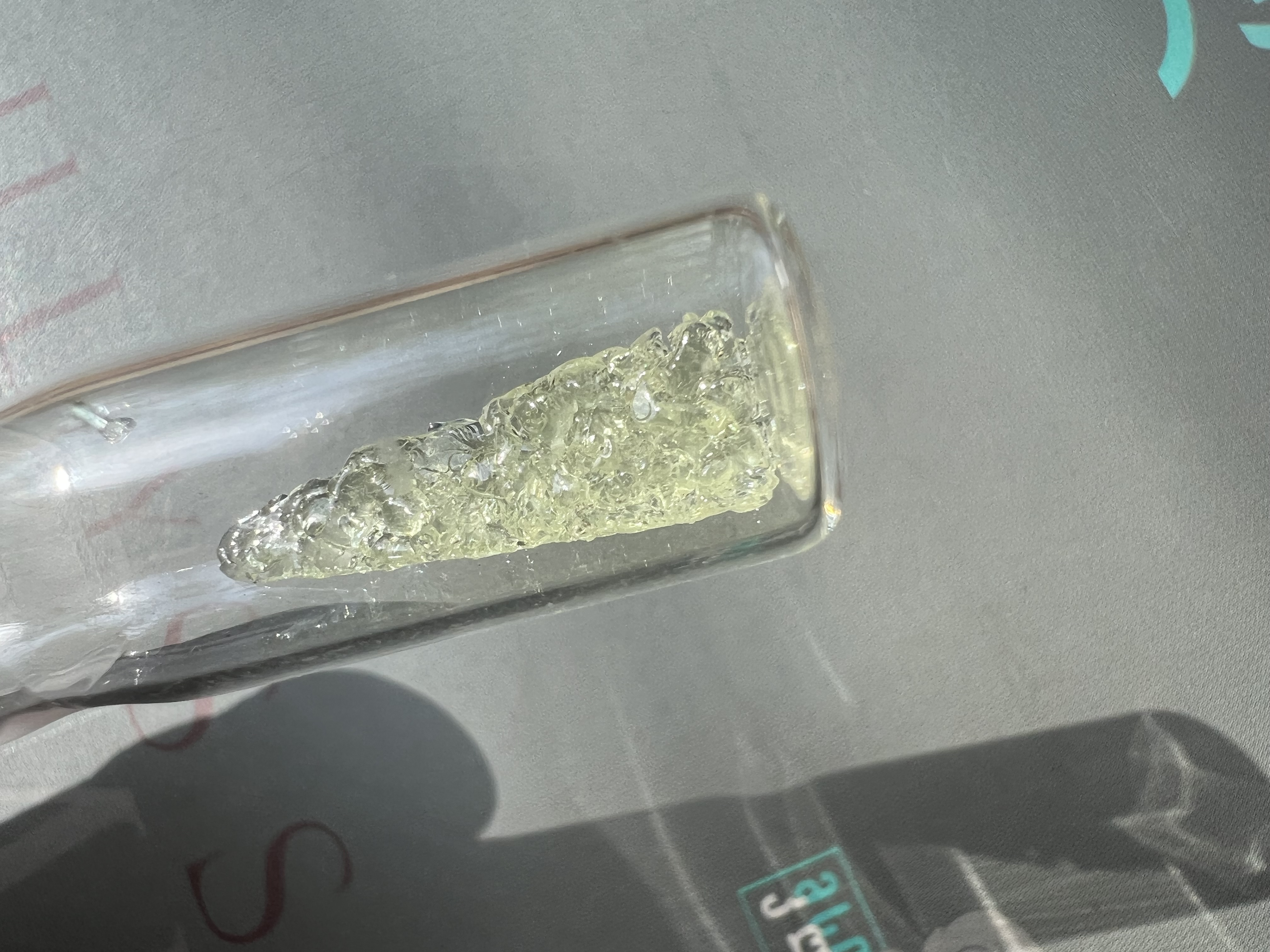
Osmium tetroxide (OsO_{4})

The most common compound exhibiting the +8 oxidation state, osmium tetroxide (OsO_{4}), is a toxic, volatile, and water-soluble solid with a "pronounced and nauseating" smell. Osmium tetroxide forms red perosmates OsO_{4}(OH)_{2}^{2−} upon reaction with alkali. With ammonia, it forms the nitrido-osmates OsO_{3}N^{−}. The +4 oxide, osmium dioxide (OsO_{2}), is a darkly-colored, non-volatile, and much less reactive compound.

Osmium pentafluoride (OsF_{5}) is known, but osmium trifluoride (OsF_{3}) has not yet been synthesized. The lower oxidation states are stabilized by the larger halogens, so that the trichloride, tribromide, triiodide, and even diiodide are known. The oxidation state +1 is known only for osmium monoiodide (OsI), whereas several carbonyl complexes of osmium, such as triosmium dodecacarbonyl (Os_{3}(CO)_{12}), represent oxidation state 0.

In general, the lower oxidation states of osmium are stabilized by ligands that are good σ-donors (such as amines) and π-acceptors (heterocycles containing nitrogen). The higher oxidation states are stabilized by strong σ- and π-donors, such as O^{2−} and N^{3−}.

Despite its broad range of compounds in numerous oxidation states, osmium in bulk form at ordinary temperatures and pressures is inert. It resists attack by most acids and bases including aqua regia, but is attacked by F_{2} and Cl_{2} at high temperatures, and by hot concentrated nitric acid to produce OsO_{4}. It can be dissolved by molten alkalis fused with an oxidizer such as sodium peroxide (Na_{2}O_{2}) or potassium chlorate (KClO_{3}) to give osmates such as K_{2}[OsO_{2}(OH)_{4}].

=== Isotopes ===
Osmium has seven naturally occurring isotopes, five of which are stable: ^{187}Os, ^{188}Os, ^{189}Os, ^{190}Os, and (most abundant) ^{192}Os. At least 37 artificial radioisotopes and 20 nuclear isomers exist, with mass numbers ranging from 160 to 203; the most stable of these is ^{194}Os with a half-life of 6.0 years.

The two primordial radioisotopes ^{184}Os and ^{186}Os are known to undergo alpha decay, but with such long half-lives — the current best values are (1.12±0.23)×10^{13} and (2.0±1.1)×10^{15} years, approximately 140000 times the age of the universe — that for practical purposes it can be considered stable. Alpha decay is predicted for all the other naturally occurring isotopes, but has not been observed, presumably due to very long half-lives; ^{184}Os and ^{192}Os are also predicted to undergo double beta decay, but this not been observed either.

^{189}Os has a spin of 3/2 but ^{187}Os has a nuclear spin 1/2. Its low natural abundance (1.64%) and low nuclear magnetic moment mean that it is one of the most difficult natural abundance isotopes for NMR spectroscopy.

^{187}Os is the descendant of ^{187}Re (half-life 4.12×10^{10} years) and is used extensively in dating terrestrial as well as meteoric rocks (see Rhenium–osmium dating). It has also been used to measure the intensity of continental weathering over geologic time and to fix minimum ages for stabilization of the mantle roots of continental cratons. This decay is a reason why rhenium-rich minerals are abnormally rich in ^{187}Os.

== History ==
Osmium was discovered in 1803 by Smithson Tennant and William Hyde Wollaston in London, England. Its discovery is intertwined with that of platinum and the other metals of the platinum group. Platinum reached Europe as platina ("small silver"), first encountered in the late 17th century in silver mines around the Chocó Department, in Colombia. The discovery that this metal was not an alloy but a new element was published in 1748.

Chemists who studied platinum dissolved it in aqua regia (a mixture of hydrochloric and nitric acids) to create soluble salts. They always observed a small amount of a dark, insoluble residue. Joseph Louis Proust thought the residue was graphite. Victor Collet-Descotils, Antoine François, comte de Fourcroy, and Louis Nicolas Vauquelin also observed iridium in the black platinum residue in 1803, but did not obtain enough material for further experiments. Later the two French chemists Fourcroy and Vauquelin identified a metal in a platinum residue they called ptène.

In 1803, Smithson Tennant analyzed the insoluble residue and concluded that it must contain a new metal. Vauquelin treated the powder alternately with alkali and acids and obtained a volatile new oxide, which he believed was of this new metal—which he named ptene, from the Greek word πτηνος (ptènos) for winged. However, Tennant, who had the advantage of a much larger amount of residue, continued his research and identified two previously undiscovered elements in the black residue, iridium and osmium. He obtained a yellow solution (probably of cis−[Os(OH)_{2}O_{4}]^{2−}) by reactions with sodium hydroxide at red heat. After acidification he was able to distill the formed OsO_{4}. He named it osmium after Greek osme meaning "a smell", because of the chlorine-like and slightly garlic-like smell of the volatile osmium tetroxide. Discovery of the new elements was documented in a letter to the Royal Society on June 21, 1804.

Uranium and osmium were early successful catalysts in the Haber process, the nitrogen fixation reaction of nitrogen and hydrogen to produce ammonia, giving enough yield to make the process economically successful. At the time, a group at BASF led by Carl Bosch bought most of the world's supply of osmium to use as a catalyst. Shortly thereafter, in 1908, cheaper catalysts based on iron and iron oxides were introduced by the same group for the first pilot plants, removing the need for the expensive and rare osmium.

Osmium is now obtained primarily from the processing of platinum and nickel ores.

== Occurrence ==
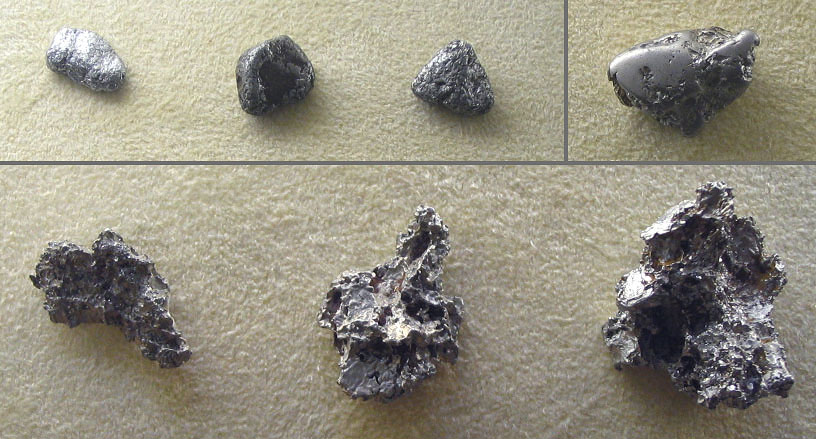
Native platinum containing traces of the other platinum-group metals

Osmium is one of the least abundant stable elements in Earth's crust, with an average mass fraction of 50 parts per trillion in the continental crust.

Osmium is found in nature as an uncombined element or in natural alloys, especially the iridium–osmium alloys osmiridium (iridium rich), and iridosmium (osmium rich). In nickel and copper deposits, the platinum-group metals occur as sulfides (i.e., (Pt,Pd)S), tellurides (e.g., PtBiTe), antimonides (e.g., PdSb), and arsenides (e.g., PtAs_{2}); in all of these compounds, platinum is exchangeable with a small amount of iridium and osmium. As with all of the platinum-group metals, osmium can be found naturally in alloys with nickel or copper.

Within the Earth's crust, osmium, like iridium, is found at highest concentrations in three types of geologic structure: igneous deposits (crustal intrusions from below), impact craters, and deposits reworked from one of the former structures. The largest known primary reserves are in the Bushveld Igneous Complex in South Africa, though the large copper–nickel deposits near Norilsk in Russia, and the Sudbury Basin in Canada are also significant sources of osmium. Smaller reserves can be found in the United States. The alluvial deposits used by pre-Columbian people in the Chocó Department, Colombia, are still a source for platinum-group metals. The second large alluvial deposit was found in the Ural Mountains, Russia, which is still mined.

== Production ==
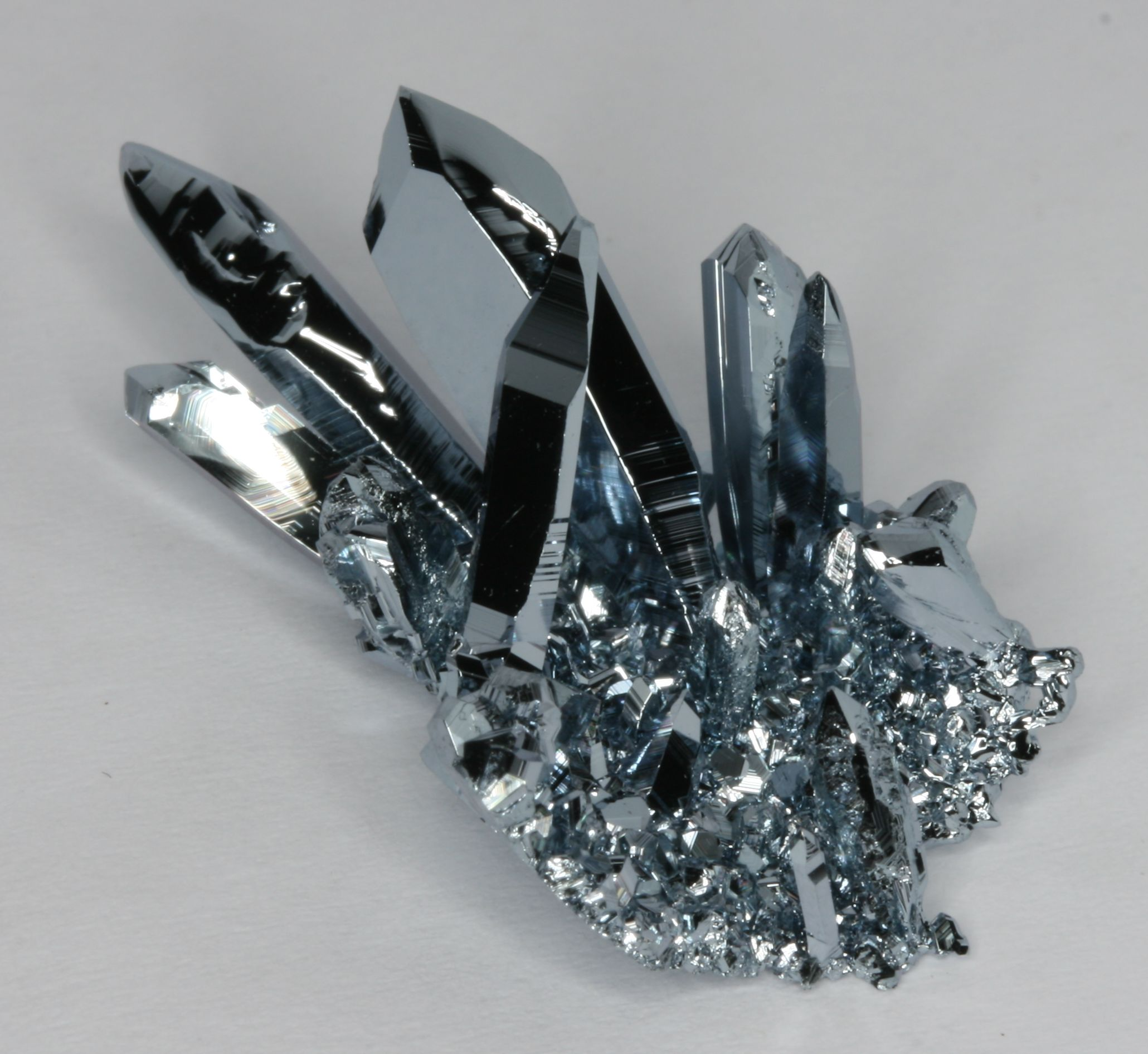
Osmium crystals, grown by chemical vapor transport

Osmium is obtained commercially as a by-product from nickel and copper mining and processing. During electrorefining of copper and nickel, noble metals such as silver, gold and the platinum-group metals, together with non-metallic elements such as selenium and tellurium, settle to the bottom of the cell as anode mud, which forms the starting material for their extraction. Separating the metals requires that they first be brought into solution. Several methods can achieve this, depending on the separation process and the composition of the mixture. Two representative methods are fusion with sodium peroxide followed by dissolution in aqua regia, and dissolution in a mixture of chlorine with hydrochloric acid. Osmium, ruthenium, rhodium, and iridium can be separated from platinum, gold, and base metals by their insolubility in aqua regia, leaving a solid residue. Rhodium can be separated from the residue by treatment with molten sodium bisulfate. The insoluble residue, containing ruthenium, osmium, and iridium, is treated with sodium oxide, in which Ir is insoluble, producing water-soluble ruthenium and osmium salts. After oxidation to the volatile oxides, RuO_{4} is separated from OsO_{4} by precipitation of (NH_{4})_{3}RuCl_{6} with ammonium chloride.

After it is dissolved, osmium is separated from the other platinum-group metals by distillation or extraction with organic solvents of the volatile osmium tetroxide. The first method is similar to the procedure used by Tennant and Wollaston. Both methods are suitable for industrial-scale production. Modern methods involve reducing ammonium hexachloroosmate(IV) using hydrogen, yielding the metal as a powder or sponge that can be treated using powder metallurgy techniques.

Estimates of annual worldwide osmium production are on the order of several hundred to a few thousand kilograms. Production and consumption figures for osmium are not well reported because demand for the metal is limited and can be fulfilled with the byproducts of other refining processes. To reflect this, statistics often report osmium with other minor platinum-group metals such as iridium and ruthenium. US imports of osmium from 2014 to 2021 averaged 155 kg annually.

== Applications ==
Because osmium is virtually unforgeable when fully dense and very fragile when sintered, it is rarely used in its pure state, but is instead often alloyed with other metals for high-wear applications. Osmium alloys such as osmiridium are very hard and, along with other platinum-group metals, are used in the tips of fountain pens, instrument pivots, and electrical contacts, as they can resist wear from frequent operation. They were also used for the tips of phonograph styli during the late 78 rpm and early "LP" and "45" record era, circa 1945 to 1955. Osmium-alloy tips were significantly more durable than steel and chromium needle points, but wore out far more rapidly than competing, and costlier, sapphire and diamond tips, so they were discontinued.

Only two osmium compounds have major applications: osmium tetroxide for staining tissue in electron microscopy and for the oxidation of alkenes in organic synthesis, and the non-volatile osmates for organic oxidation reactions.

Osmium tetroxide has been used in fingerprint detection and in staining fatty tissue for optical and electron microscopy. As a strong oxidant, it cross-links lipids mainly by reacting with unsaturated carbon–carbon bonds and thereby both fixes biological membranes in place in tissue samples and simultaneously stains them. Because osmium atoms are extremely electron-dense, osmium staining greatly enhances image contrast in transmission electron microscopy (TEM) studies of biological materials. Those carbon materials otherwise have very weak TEM contrast. Another osmium compound, osmium ferricyanide (OsFeCN), exhibits similar fixing and staining action.

The tetroxide and its derivative potassium osmate are important oxidants in organic synthesis. For the Sharpless asymmetric dihydroxylation, which uses osmate for the conversion of a double bond into a vicinal diol, Karl Barry Sharpless was awarded the Nobel Prize in Chemistry in 2001. OsO_{4} is very expensive for this use, so KMnO_{4} is often used instead, even though the yields are less for this cheaper chemical reagent.

In 1898, the Austrian chemist Auer von Welsbach developed the Oslamp with a filament made of osmium, which he introduced commercially in 1902. After only a few years, osmium was replaced by tungsten, which is more abundant (and thus cheaper) and more stable. Tungsten has the highest melting point among all metals, and its use in light bulbs increases the luminous efficacy and life of incandescent lamps.

The light bulb manufacturer Osram (founded in 1906, when three German companies, Auer-Gesellschaft, AEG and Siemens & Halske, combined their lamp production facilities) derived its name from the elements of osmium and Wolfram (the latter is German for tungsten).

Osmium has high reflectivity in the ultraviolet range of the electromagnetic spectrum; for example, at 600 Å osmium has a reflectivity twice that of gold. This high reflectivity is desirable in space-based UV spectrometers, which have reduced mirror sizes due to space limitations. Osmium-coated mirrors were flown in several space missions aboard the Space Shuttle, but it soon became clear that the oxygen radicals in low Earth orbit are abundant enough to significantly deteriorate the osmium layer.

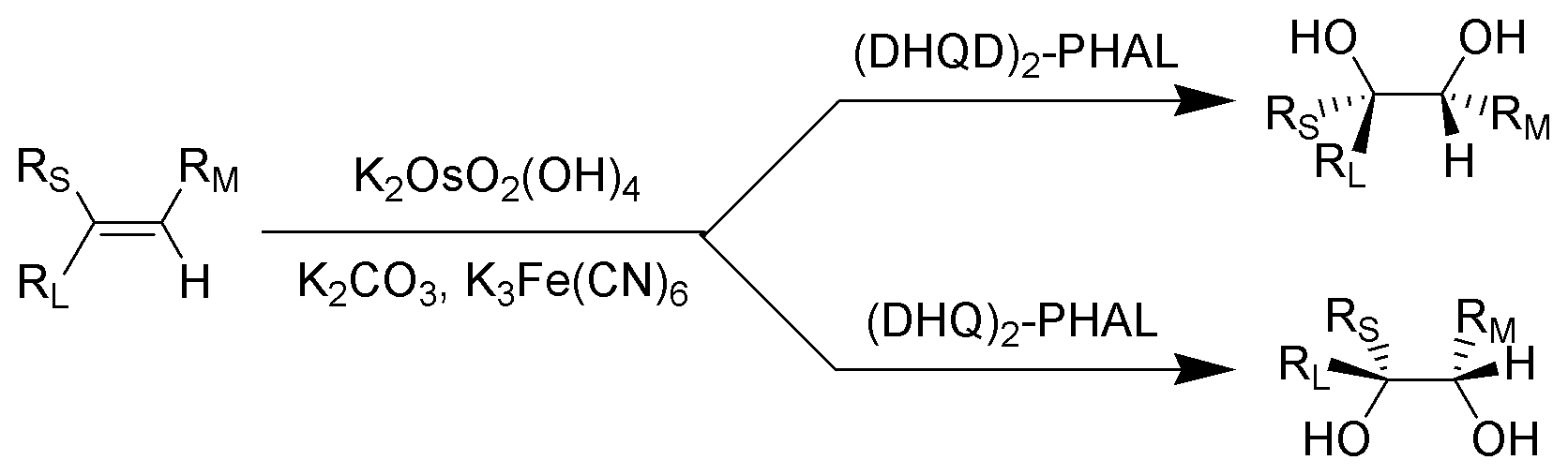
The Sharpless dihydroxylation:
R_{L} = largest substituent; R_{M} = medium-sized substituent; R_{S} = smallest substituent

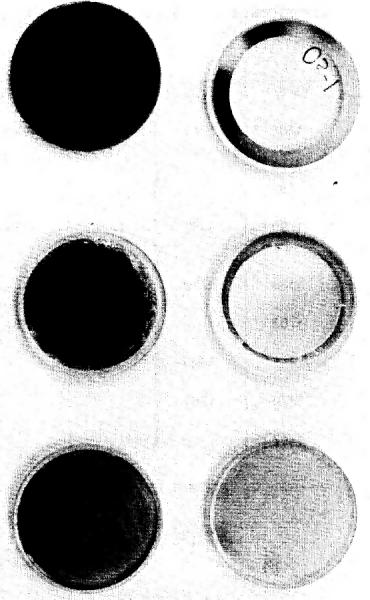
Post-flight appearance of Os, Ag, and Au mirrors from the front (left images) and rear panels of the Space Shuttle. Blackening reveals oxidation due to irradiation by oxygen atoms.

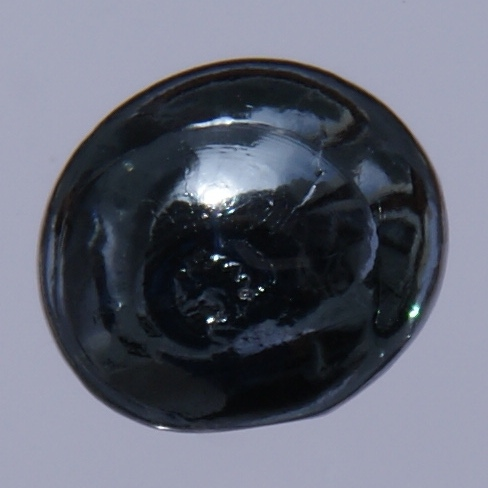
A bead of osmium, about 0.5 cm in diameter, displaying the metal's reflectivity

== Precautions ==
Osmium metal is generally harmless, as it is unaffected by oxygen below 400°C. Its primary hazard is the potential formation of highly toxic and volatile osmium tetroxide (OsO_{4}). At room temperature this reaction is thermodynamically favorable for finely divided powder, which slowly reacts with air such that samples can sometimes smell like OsO_{4}.

== Price ==
Between 1990 and 2010, the nominal price of osmium metal was almost constant, while inflation reduced the real value from ~US$950 per troy ounce ($31,000/kg) to ~US$600 per troy ounce ($19,000/kg). Because osmium has few commercial applications, it is not heavily traded and prices are seldom reported.
