= Iridium-192 =

Radioactive isotope of iridium

General
- Symbol: ^{192}Ir
- Names: Iridium-192
- Protons (Z): 77
- Neutrons (N): 115

Nuclide data
- Natural abundance: synthetic
- Half-life (t_{1/2}): 73.82 days
- Isotope mass: 191.962605 Da
- Spin: 4+
- Parent isotopes: ^{192m}Os (β^{−})
- Decay products: ^{192}Pt^{192}Os

Decay modes
- Decay mode: Decay energy (MeV)

Iridium-192 (symbol ^{192}Ir) is a radioactive isotope of iridium, with a half-life of 73.82 days. It decays by emitting beta (β) particles and gamma (γ) radiation. 95.24% of ^{192}Ir decays occur via β^{-} emission, leading to ^{192}Pt; the remaining 4.76% occur via electron capture to ^{192}Os; both modes involve gamma emission. Iridium-192 is normally produced by neutron activation of natural-abundance iridium metal. Iridium-192 is a very strong gamma ray emitter, with a gamma dose constant of 1.54 μSv·h^{−1}·MBq^{−1} at 30 cm, and a specific activity of 341 TBq·g^{−1} (9.22 kCi·g^{−1}). There are seven principal gamma rays produced in its beta-minus decay, ranging from 296.0 to 612.5 keV, and two produced in its electron capture decay at 205.8 and 484.6 keV. It is commonly used as a gamma ray source in industrial radiography to locate flaws in metal components. It is also used in radiotherapy as a radiation source, in particular in brachytherapy. Iridium-192 has accounted for the majority of cases tracked by the U.S. Nuclear Regulatory Commission in which radioactive materials have gone missing in quantities large enough to make a dirty bomb.

The metastable isomer ^{192m2}Ir is iridium's most stable isomer. It decays solely by isomeric transition (to this ground state) with a half-life of 241 years, which is somewhat unusual for its long half-life and that said half-life greatly exceeds that of the ground state.

== See also ==
- Isotopes of iridium
