= Isotopes of gold =

Isotopes of gold (_{79}Au)
Main isotopes			Decay	
Isotope	abundance	half-life (t_{1/2})	mode	product
^{195}Au	synth	186.01 d	ε	^{195}Pt
^{196}Au	synth	6.165 d	β^{+}	^{196}Pt
^{196}Au	synth	6.165 d	β^{−}	^{196}Hg
^{197}Au	100%	stable		
^{198}Au	synth	2.6946 d	β^{−}	^{198}Hg
^{199}Au	synth	3.139 d	β^{−}	^{199}Hg

Standard atomic weight A_{r}°(Au)
- 196.966570±0.000004; 196.97±0.01 (abridged)

Gold (_{79}Au) has one stable isotope, ^{197}Au, and known radioisotopes ranging from ^{169}Au to ^{210}Au, with ^{195}Au being the most stable with a half-life of 186.01 days, followed by ^{196}Au at 6.165 days. Isotopes heavier than the stable mass number 197 generally decay by beta emission to mercury isotopes, while those lighter decay by electron capture to platinum isotopes or alpha emission to iridium isotopes; 196 decays both to platinum and to mercury. Of the meta states the most stable is ^{198m2}Au at 2.27 days.

Gold is currently the heaviest monoisotopic element (and is also mononuclidic). Bismuth formerly held that distinction until alpha decay of the ^{209}Bi isotope was observed. All isotopes of gold are either radioactive or, in the case of ^{197}Au, observationally stable, meaning that ^{197}Au is predicted to be radioactive but no actual decay has been observed.

== List of isotopes ==
Nuclide (Note: ^{m}Au – Excited nuclear isomer.)	Z	N	Isotopic mass (Da) (Note: ( ) – Uncertainty (1σ) is given in concise form in parentheses after the corresponding last digits.) (Note: # – Atomic mass marked #: value and uncertainty derived not from purely experimental data, but at least partly from trends from the Mass Surface (TMS).)	Discovery year	Half-life (Note: # – Values marked # are not purely derived from experimental data, but at least partly from trends of neighboring nuclides (TNN).)	Decay mode (Note: Modes of decay: EC: / Electron capture; IT: / Isomeric transition; p: / Proton emission)	Daughter isotope (Note: Bold italics symbol as daughter – Daughter product is nearly stable.) (Note: Bold symbol as daughter – Daughter product is stable.)	Spin and parity (Note: ( ) spin value – Indicates spin with weak assignment arguments.)	Isotopic abundance
Nuclide	Excitation energy			Discovery year	Half-life	Decay mode	Daughter isotope	Spin and parity	Isotopic abundance
^{169}Au	79	90	168.99808(32)#	(2000)	1.16+0.50 −0.47 μs	p (~94%)	^{168}Pt	(11/2−)	
^{169}Au	79	90	168.99808(32)#	(2000)	1.16+0.50 −0.47 μs	α (~6%)	^{165m}Ir	(11/2−)	
^{170}Au	79	91	169.99602(22)#	2004	286+50 −40 μs	p (89%)	^{169}Pt	(2)−	
^{170}Au	79	91	169.99602(22)#	2004	286+50 −40 μs	α (11%)	^{166}Ir	(2)−	
^{170m}Au	282(10) keV			2004	617+50 −40 μs	p (58%)	^{169}Pt	(9)+	
^{170m}Au	282(10) keV			2004	617+50 −40 μs	α (42%)	^{166m}Ir	(9)+	
^{171}Au	79	92	170.991882(22)	1997	22+3 −2 μs	p	^{170}Pt	1/2+	
^{171}Au	79	92	170.991882(22)	1997	22+3 −2 μs	α?	^{167}Ir	1/2+	
^{171m}Au	258(13) keV			1999	1.09(3) ms	α (66%)	^{167m}Ir	11/2−	
^{171m}Au	258(13) keV			1999	1.09(3) ms	p (34%)	^{170}Pt	11/2−	
^{172}Au	79	93	171.99000(6)	1993	28(4) ms	α (98%)	^{168}Ir	(2)−	
^{172}Au	79	93	171.99000(6)	1993	28(4) ms	p (2%)	^{171}Pt	(2)−	
^{172}Au	79	93	171.99000(6)	1993	28(4) ms	β^{+}	^{172}Pt	(2)−	
^{172m}Au (Note: Order of ground state and isomer is uncertain.)	160(250) keV			2009	11.0(10) ms	α	^{168}Ir	(9,10)+	
^{172m}Au	160(250) keV			2009	11.0(10) ms	p?	^{171}Pt	(9,10)+	
^{173}Au	79	94	172.986224(24)	1983	25.5(8) ms	α (86%)	^{169}Ir	(1/2+)	
^{173}Au	79	94	172.986224(24)	1983	25.5(8) ms	β^{+} (14%)	^{173}Pt	(1/2+)	
^{173m}Au	214(21) keV			1999	12.2(1) ms	α (89%)	^{169}Ir	(11/2−)	
^{173m}Au	214(21) keV			1999	12.2(1) ms	β^{+} (11%)	^{173}Pt	(11/2−)	
^{174}Au	79	95	173.98491(11)#	1983	139(3) ms	α (90%)	^{170}Ir	(3−)	
^{174}Au	79	95	173.98491(11)#	1983	139(3) ms	β^{+} (10%)	^{174}Pt	(3−)	
^{174m}Au	130(50)# keV			(2004) (Note: Only published in a conference proceeding and not a refereed journal)	162(2) ms	α?	^{170}Ir	(9+)	
^{174m}Au	130(50)# keV			(2004)	162(2) ms	β^{+}?	^{174}Pt	(9+)	
^{175}Au	79	96	174.98132(4)	1975	200(3) ms	α (88%)	^{171}Ir	1/2+	
^{175}Au	79	96	174.98132(4)	1975	200(3) ms	β^{+} (12%)	^{175}Pt	1/2+	
^{175m}Au	164(11)# keV			2013	136(1) ms	α (75%)	^{171}Ir	(11/2−)	
^{175m}Au	164(11)# keV			2013	136(1) ms	β^{+} (25%)	^{175}Pt	(11/2−)	
^{176}Au	79	97	175.98012(4)	1975	1.05(1) s	α (75%)	^{172}Ir	(3−,4−)	
^{176}Au	79	97	175.98012(4)	1975	1.05(1) s	β^{+} (25%)	^{176}Pt	(3−,4−)	
^{176m}Au	139(13) keV			2014	1.36(2) s	α?	^{172}Ir	(8+,9+)	
^{176m}Au	139(13) keV			2014	1.36(2) s	β^{+}?	^{176}Pt	(8+,9+)	
^{177}Au	79	98	176.976870(11)	1968	1.501(20) s	β^{+} (60%)	^{177}Pt	1/2+	
^{177}Au	79	98	176.976870(11)	1968	1.501(20) s	α (40%)	^{173}Ir	1/2+	
^{177m}Au	190(7) keV			2001	1.193(13) s	α (60%)	^{173}Ir	11/2−	
^{177m}Au	190(7) keV			2001	1.193(13) s	β^{+} (40%)	^{177}Pt	11/2−	
^{178}Au	79	99	177.976057(11)	1968	3.4(5) s	β^{+} (84%)	^{178}Pt	(2+,3−)	
^{178}Au	79	99	177.976057(11)	1968	3.4(5) s	α (16%)	^{174}Ir	(2+,3−)	
^{178m1}Au	50.3(2) keV			2021	300(10) ns	IT	^{178}Au	(4−,5+)	
^{178m2}Au	186(14) keV			2020	2.7(5) s	β^{+} (82%)	^{178}Pt	(7+,8−)	
^{178m2}Au	186(14) keV			2020	2.7(5) s	α (18%)	^{174}Ir	(7+,8−)	
^{178m3}Au	243(14) keV			2021	390(10) ns	IT	^{178}Au	(5+,6)	
^{179}Au	79	100	178.973174(13)	1968	7.1(3) s	β^{+} (78.0%)	^{179}Pt	1/2+	
^{179}Au	79	100	178.973174(13)	1968	7.1(3) s	α (22.0%)	^{175}Ir	1/2+	
^{179m1}Au	89.5(3) keV			2011	327(5) ns	IT	^{179}Au	(3/2−)	
^{179m2}Au	1743(17) keV			2011	2.16(8) μs	IT	^{179}Au	(19/2+)	
^{180}Au	79	101	179.9724898(51)	1977	7.9(3) s	β^{+} (99.42%)	^{180}Pt	(1+)	
^{180}Au	79	101	179.9724898(51)	1977	7.9(3) s	α (0.58%)	^{176}Ir	(1+)	
^{181}Au	79	102	180.970079(21)	1968	13.7(14) s	β^{+} (97.3%)	^{181}Pt	(5/2−)	
^{181}Au	79	102	180.970079(21)	1968	13.7(14) s	α (2.7%)	^{177}Ir	(5/2−)	
^{182}Au	79	103	181.969614(20)	1970	15.5(4) s	β^{+} (99.87%)	^{182}Pt	(2+)	
^{182}Au	79	103	181.969614(20)	1970	15.5(4) s	α (0.13%)	^{178}Ir	(2+)	
^{183}Au	79	104	182.967588(10)	1968	42.8(10) s	β^{+} (99.45%)	^{183}Pt	5/2−	
^{183}Au	79	104	182.967588(10)	1968	42.8(10) s	α (0.55%)	^{179}Ir	5/2−	
^{183m}Au	73.10(1) keV			1984	>1 μs	IT	^{183}Au	(1/2)+	
^{184}Au	79	105	183.967452(24)	1969	20.6(9) s	β^{+} (99.99%)	^{184}Pt	5+	
^{184}Au	79	105	183.967452(24)	1969	20.6(9) s	α (0.013%)	^{180}Ir	5+	
^{184m}Au	68.46(4) keV			1997	47.6(14) s	β^{+} (70%)	^{184}Pt	2+	
^{184m}Au	68.46(4) keV			1997	47.6(14) s	IT (30%)	^{184}Au	2+	
^{184m}Au	68.46(4) keV			1997	47.6(14) s	α (0.013%)	^{180}Ir	2+	
^{185}Au	79	106	184.9657989(28)	1960	4.25(6) min	β^{+} (99.74%)	^{185}Pt	5/2−	
^{185}Au	79	106	184.9657989(28)	1960	4.25(6) min	α (0.26%)	^{181}Ir	5/2−	
^{185m1}Au	50(50)# keV			1968	6.8(3) min	β^{+}	^{185}Pt	1/2+#	
^{185m1}Au	50(50)# keV			1968	6.8(3) min	IT?	^{185}Au	1/2+#	
^{185m2}Au	1504.2(4)# keV			1968	630(80) ns	IT	^{185}Au		
^{186}Au	79	107	185.965953(23)	1960	10.7(5) min	β^{+}	^{186}Pt	3−	
^{186}Au	79	107	185.965953(23)	1960	10.7(5) min	α (8×10^{−4}%)	^{182}Ir	3−	
^{186m}Au	227.77(7) keV			1985	110(10) ns	IT	^{186}Au	2+	
^{187}Au	79	108	186.964542(24)	1955	8.3(2) min	β^{+}	^{187}Pt	1/2+	
^{187}Au	79	108	186.964542(24)	1955	8.3(2) min	α?	^{183}Ir	1/2+	
^{187m1}Au	120.33(14) keV			1983	2.3(1) s	IT	^{187}Au	9/2−	
^{187m2}Au	2669.4(18) keV			1989	100 s	IT	^{187}Au	(31/2−)	
^{188}Au	79	109	187.9652480(29)	1955	8.84(6) min	β^{+}	^{188}Pt	1−	
^{189}Au	79	110	188.963948(22)	1955	28.7(4) min	β^{+}	^{189}Pt	1/2+	
^{189}Au	79	110	188.963948(22)	1955	28.7(4) min	α? (<3×10^{−5}%)	^{185}Ir	1/2+	
^{189m1}Au	247.25(16) keV			1966	4.59(11) min	β^{+}	^{189}Pt	11/2−	
^{189m1}Au	247.25(16) keV			1966	4.59(11) min	IT?	^{189}Au	11/2−	
^{189m2}Au	325.12(16) keV			1975	190(15) ns	IT	^{189}Au	9/2−	
^{189m3}Au	2554.8(8) keV			1975	242(10) ns	IT	^{189}Au	31/2+	
^{190}Au	79	111	189.964752(4)	1959	42.8(10) min	β^{+}	^{190}Pt	1−	
^{190}Au	79	111	189.964752(4)	1959	42.8(10) min	α? (<10^{−6}%)	^{186}Ir	1−	
^{190m}Au	200(150)# keV			1982	125(20) ms	IT	^{190}Au	11−#	
^{190m}Au	200(150)# keV			1982	125(20) ms	β^{+}?	^{190}Pt	11−#	
^{191}Au	79	112	190.963716(5)	1954	3.18(8) h	β^{+}	^{191}Pt	3/2+	
^{191m1}Au	266.2(7) keV			1971	920(110) ms	IT	^{191}Au	11/2−	
^{191m2}Au	2489.6(9) keV			1985	402(20) ns	IT	^{191}Au	31/2+	
^{192}Au	79	113	191.964818(17)	1948	4.94(9) h	β^{+}	^{192}Pt	1−	
^{192m1}Au	135.41(25) keV			1982	29 ms	IT	^{192}Au	5+	
^{192m2}Au	431.6(5) keV			1982	160(20) ms	IT	^{192}Au	11−	
^{193}Au	79	114	192.964138(9)	1948	17.65(15) h	β^{+}	^{193}Pt	3/2+	
^{193m1}Au	290.20(4) keV			1954	3.9(3) s	IT (99.97%)	^{193}Au	11/2−	
^{193m1}Au	290.20(4) keV			1954	3.9(3) s	β^{+} (0.03%)	^{193}Pt	11/2−	
^{193m2}Au	2486.7(6) keV			1979	150(50) ns	IT	^{193}Au	31/2+	
^{194}Au	79	115	193.9654191(23)	1948	38.02(10) h	β^{+}	^{194}Pt	1−	
^{194m1}Au	107.4(5) keV			1975	600(8) ms	IT	^{194}Au	5+	
^{194m2}Au	475.8(6) keV			1975	420(10) ms	IT	^{194}Au	11−	
^{195}Au	79	116	194.9650378(12)	1948	186.01(6) d	EC	^{195}Pt	3/2+	
^{195m1}Au	318.58(4) keV			1955	30.5(2) s	IT	^{195}Au	11/2−	
^{195m2}Au	2501(20)# keV			2013	12.89(21) μs	IT	^{195}Au	31/2(−)	
^{196}Au	79	117	195.966571(3)	1937	6.165(11) d	β^{+} (93.0%)	^{196}Pt	2−	
^{196}Au	79	117	195.966571(3)	1937	6.165(11) d	β^{−} (7.0%)	^{196}Hg	2−	
^{196m1}Au	84.656(20) keV			1971	8.1(2) s	IT	^{196}Au	5+	
^{196m2}Au	595.66(4) keV			1937	9.603(22) h	IT	^{196}Au	12−	
^{197}Au (Note: Potential material for salted bombs)	79	118	196.9665701(6)	1935	Observationally Stable (Note: Theoretically predicted to undergo α decay to ^{193}Ir)			3/2+	1.0000
^{197m1}Au	409.15(8) keV			1945	7.73(6) s	IT	^{197}Au	11/2−	
^{197m2}Au	2532.5(10) keV			2006	150(5) ns	IT	^{197}Au	27/2+#	
^{198}Au	79	119	197.9682437(6)	1937	2.69464(14) d	β^{−}	^{198}Hg	2−	
^{198m1}Au	312.2227(20) keV			1968	124(4) ns	IT	^{198}Au	5+	
^{198m2}Au	811.9(15) keV			1972	2.272(16) d	IT	^{198}Au	12−	
^{199}Au	79	120	198.9687666(6)	1937	3.139(7) d	β^{−}	^{199}Hg	3/2+	
^{199m}Au	548.9405(21) keV			1968	440(30) μs	IT	^{199}Au	11/2−	
^{200}Au	79	121	199.970757(29)	1951	48.4(3) min	β^{−}	^{200}Hg	(1−)	
^{200m}Au	1010(40) keV			1968	18.7(5) h	β^{−} (84%)	^{200}Hg	12−	
^{200m}Au	1010(40) keV			1968	18.7(5) h	IT (16%)	^{200}Au	12−	
^{201}Au	79	122	200.971658(3)	1952	26.0(8) min	β^{−}	^{201}Hg	3/2+	
^{201m1}Au	594(5) keV			2011	730(630) μs	IT	^{201}Au	11/2-	
^{201m2}Au	1610(5) keV			2011	5.6(24) μs	IT	^{201}Au	19/2+#	
^{202}Au	79	123	201.973856(25)	1967	28.4(12) s	β^{−}	^{202}Hg	(1−)	
^{203}Au	79	124	202.9751545(33)	1952	60(6) s	β^{−}	^{203}Hg	3/2+	
^{203m}Au	641(3) keV			2005	140(44) μs	IT	^{203}Au	11/2−#	
^{204}Au	79	125	203.97811(22)#	1972	38.3(13) s	β^{−}	^{204}Hg	(2−)	
^{204m}Au	3816(500)# keV			2011	2.1(3) μs	IT	^{204}Au	16+#	
^{205}Au	79	126	204.98006(22)#	1994	32.0(14) s	β^{−}	^{205}Hg	3/2+#	
^{205m1}Au	907(5) keV			2009	6(2) s	IT?	^{205}Au	11/2−#	
^{205m1}Au	907(5) keV			2009	6(2) s	β^{−}?	^{205}Hg	11/2−#	
^{205m2}Au	2849.7(4) keV			2011	163(5) ns	IT	^{205}Au	19/2+#	
^{206}Au	79	127	205.98477(32)#	2011	47(11) s	β^{−}	^{206}Hg	6+#	
^{207}Au	79	128	206.98858(32)#	2010	3# s [>300 ns]	β^{−}?	^{207}Hg	3/2+#	
^{207}Au	79	128	206.98858(32)#	2010	3# s [>300 ns]	β^{−}, n?	^{206}Hg	3/2+#	
^{208}Au	79	129	207.99366(32)#	2010	20# s [>300 ns]	β^{−}?	^{208}Hg	6+#	
^{208}Au	79	129	207.99366(32)#	2010	20# s [>300 ns]	β^{−}, n?	^{207}Hg	6+#	
^{209}Au	79	130	208.99761(43)#	2010	1# s [>300 ns]	β^{−}?	^{209}Hg	3/2+#	
^{209}Au	79	130	208.99761(43)#	2010	1# s [>300 ns]	β^{−}, n?	^{208}Hg	3/2+#	
^{210}Au	79	131	210.00288(43)#	2010	10# s [>300 ns]	β^{−}?	^{210}Hg	6+#	
^{210}Au	79	131	210.00288(43)#	2010	10# s [>300 ns]	β^{−}, n?	^{209}Hg	6+#	
This table header & footer:

== Gold-198 ==
Decay scheme of ^{198}Au to ^{198}Hg

Gold-198 (^{198}Au) is a radioactive isotope of gold, normally made by neutron capture on natural gold (entirely gold-197). It undergoes exclusively beta decay to stable ^{198}Hg with a half-life of 2.6946 days. The decay of ^{198}Au (shown) is relatively simple, involving only three levels of the daughter product nucleus. 99% of decaying atoms follow the path to the middle level, and thus emit a beta particle with maximum energy 961 keV (the rest goes to the neutrino) and a single gamma ray of energy 412 keV (converted about 4%).

^{198}Au was possibly observed for the first time in 1935 by Enrico Fermi et al., though it was not correctly identified at the time. This isotope was conclusively identified in 1937 following neutron irradiation of stable ^{197}Au and was ascribed a half-life of approximately 2.7 days.

=== Applications ===
^{198}Au is used for radiotherapy in some cancer treatments. Its properties may be favorable for use in medicine because the 4 mm penetration range of its beta particles in tissue allows it to destroy tumors without nearby non-cancerous tissue being affected by radiation, and its half-life is short but not so short as to create problems in handling or delivery. For this reason, ^{198}Au nanoparticles are being investigated as an injectable treatment for prostate cancer.

Sediment and water flow can be investigated using radioactive tracers such as ^{198}Au. This has been used extensively since artificial radioisotopes became available in the 1950s, as a supplement to millennia of investigations using other tracing techniques.

Inside coker units at oil refineries, ^{198}Au is used to study the hydrodynamic behavior of solids in fluidized beds and can also be used to quantify the degree of fouling of bed internals.

Gold has been proposed as a material for creating a salted nuclear weapon (cobalt is another, better-known salting material). A jacket of natural ^{197}Au irradiated by the intense neutron flux from an exploding thermonuclear weapon, would be transmuted into ^{198}Au, whose gamma emission would significantly increase the radioactive hazard of the weapon's fallout for days. Such a weapon is not known to have ever been built, tested, or used. However, ^{198}Au was created during the SL-1 accident in 1961 when the reactor went prompt critical, causing ^{197}Au in a reactor operator's wedding ring to transmute into ^{198}Au. The highest amount of ^{198}Au detected in any United States nuclear test was in shot "Sedan" detonated at Nevada Test Site on July 6, 1962.

== See also ==
Daughter products other than gold

- Isotopes of mercury
- Isotopes of platinum
- Isotopes of iridium
