= Isotopes of osmium =

Isotopes of osmium (_{76}Os)
Main isotopes			Decay	
Isotope	abundance	half-life (t_{1/2})	mode	product
^{184}Os	0.02%	1.12×10^{13} y	α	^{180}W
^{185}Os	synth	92.95 d	ε	^{185}Re
^{186}Os	1.59%	2.0×10^{15} y	α	^{182}W
^{187}Os	1.96%	stable		
^{188}Os	13.2%	stable		
^{189}Os	16.1%	stable		
^{190}Os	26.3%	stable		
^{191}Os	synth	14.99 d	β^{−}	^{191}Ir
^{192}Os	40.8%	stable		
^{193}Os	synth	29.83 h	β^{−}	^{193}Ir
^{194}Os	synth	6.0 y	β^{−}	^{194}Ir

Standard atomic weight A_{r}°(Os)
- 190.23±0.03; 190.23±0.03 (abridged)

Osmium (_{76}Os) has seven naturally occurring isotopes, five of which are stable: ^{187}Os, ^{188}Os, ^{189}Os, ^{190}Os, and (most abundant) ^{192}Os. The other natural isotopes, ^{184}Os and ^{186}Os, have extremely long half-lives (1.12×10^{13} years and 2.0×10^{15} years, respectively) and for practical purposes can be considered to be stable as well. ^{187}Os is the daughter of ^{187}Re (half-life 4.12×10^{10} years) and is most often measured by the ^{187}Os/^{188}Os ratio. This ratio, as well as the ^{187}Re/^{188}Os ratio, have been used extensively in dating terrestrial as well as meteoric rocks. It has also been used to measure the intensity of continental weathering over geologic time and to fix minimum ages for stabilization of the mantle roots of continental cratons.

There are also 31 artificial radioisotopes, the longest-lived of which are ^{194}Os with a half-life of 6.0 years, ^{185}Os with 92.95 days, and ^{191}Os with 14.99 days; others are under 30 hours, with most under seven minutes. There are also 19 listed nuclear isomers, the longest-lived of which is ^{191m}Os with a half-life of 13.10 hours. All isotopes and nuclear isomers of osmium are either radioactive or observationally stable, meaning that they are predicted to be radioactive but no actual decay has been observed.

== Osmium isotopes in radiometric dating ==
The isotopic ratio of osmium-187 and osmium-188 (^{187}Os/^{188}Os) can be used as a window into geochemical changes throughout the ocean's history. The average marine ^{187}Os/^{188}Os ratio in oceans is 1.06. This value represents a balance of the continental riverine inputs of Os with a ^{187}Os/^{188}Os ratio of ~1.3, and the mantle/extraterrestrial inputs with a ^{187}Os/^{188}Os ratio of ~0.13. The lighter isotope, ^{187}Os, is produced by beta decay of ^{187}Re. This decay has actually increased the ^{187}Os/^{188}Os ratio of the bulk silicate earth (Earth less the core) by 33%. The difference between crust and mantle ratios is explained this way: crustal rocks have a much higher level of rhenium. Re is concentrated in the crust relative to the mantle due to partial melting of the mantle (differentiation). Because Re is partitioned into the melt more than other PGEs, it increases in the crust over time.}, which produces an excess of ^{187}Os. The combined input of the two sources to the marine environment results in the observed ratio in the oceans, and has fluctuated over the geologic history. These changes in the isotopic values of marine Os can be observed in the marine sediment that is deposited, and eventually lithified in that time period. This allows for researchers to estimate weathering fluxes, flood basalt volcanism, and impact events that may have caused some of our largest mass extinctions. The marine sediment Os isotope record has corroborated the K-T boundary impact, for example. The impact of this ~10 km asteroid massively altered the ^{187}Os/^{188}Os signature of marine sediments at that time - the average extraterrestrial ^{187}Os/^{188}Os of ~0.13 and the huge amount of Os this impact contributed (equivalent to 600,000 years of present-day riverine inputs) lowered the global marine ^{187}Os/^{188}Os value of ~0.45 to a minimum of ~0.2.

Os isotope ratios may also be used as a signal of anthropogenic impact. The same ^{187}Os/^{188}Os ratios that are common in geological settings may be used to gauge the addition of anthropogenic Os through things like catalytic converters. While catalytic converters have been shown to drastically reduce the emission of NO_{x} and CO, they are introducing platinum group elements (PGE) such as Os, to the environment. Other sources of anthropogenic Os include combustion of fossil fuels, smelting chromium ore, and smelting of some sulfide ores. In one study, the effect of automobile exhaust on the marine Os system was evaluated. Automobile exhaust ^{187}Os/^{188}Os has been recorded to be ~0.2 (similar to extraterrestrial and mantle derived inputs). The effect of anthropogenic Os can be seen best by comparing aquatic Os ratios and local sediments or deeper waters. Surface waters thought to be affected have depleted values compared to deep ocean and sediments by a ratio larger than can be explained by cosmic inputs.

The alpha decay of ^{184}Os into ^{180}W (with a rate perhaps large enough for detection) has been proposed as a radiometric dating method for osmium-rich rocks or for differentiation of a planetary core.

== List of isotopes ==
Nuclide (Note: ^{m}Os – Excited nuclear isomer.)	Z	N	Isotopic mass (Da) (Note: ( ) – Uncertainty (1σ) is given in concise form in parentheses after the corresponding last digits.) (Note: # – Atomic mass marked #: value and uncertainty derived not from purely experimental data, but at least partly from trends from the Mass Surface (TMS).)	Discovery year	Half-life (Note: Bold half-life – nearly stable, half-life longer than age of universe.)	Decay mode (Note: Modes of decay: EC: / Electron capture; IT: / Isomeric transition; p: / Proton emission)	Daughter isotope (Note: Bold italics symbol as daughter – Daughter product is nearly stable.) (Note: Bold symbol as daughter – Daughter product is stable.)	Spin and parity (Note: ( ) spin value – Indicates spin with weak assignment arguments.) (Note: # – Values marked # are not purely derived from experimental data, but at least partly from trends of neighboring nuclides (TNN).)	Natural abundance (mole fraction)	
Nuclide	Excitation energy			Discovery year	Half-life	Decay mode	Daughter isotope	Spin and parity	Normal proportion	Range of variation
^{160}Os	76	84		2024	97+97 −32 μs	α	^{156}W	0+		
^{160m}Os	1844(18) keV			2023	41+15 −9 μs	α	^{156}W	8+		
^{161}Os	76	85	160.98905(43)#	2010	0.64(6) ms	α	^{157}W	(7/2–)		
^{162}Os	76	86	161.98443(32)#	1989	2.1(1) ms	α	^{158}W	0+		
^{163}Os	76	87	162.98246(32)#	1981	5.7(5) ms	α	^{159}W	7/2–		
^{163}Os	76	87	162.98246(32)#	1981	5.7(5) ms	β^{+} ?	^{163}Re	7/2–		
^{164}Os	76	88	163.97807(16)	1981	21(1) ms	α (96%)	^{160}W	0+		
^{164}Os	76	88	163.97807(16)	1981	21(1) ms	β^{+} (4%)	^{164}Re	0+		
^{165}Os	76	89	164.97665(22)#	1978	71(3) ms	α (90%)	^{161}W	(7/2–)		
^{165}Os	76	89	164.97665(22)#	1978	71(3) ms	β^{+} (10%)	^{165}Re	(7/2–)		
^{166}Os	76	90	165.972698(19)	1977	213(5) ms	α (83%)	^{162}W	0+		
^{166}Os	76	90	165.972698(19)	1977	213(5) ms	β^{+} (17%)	^{166}Re	0+		
^{167}Os	76	91	166.971552(87)	1977	839(5) ms	α (51%)	^{163}W	7/2–		
^{167}Os	76	91	166.971552(87)	1977	839(5) ms	β^{+} (49%)	^{167}Re	7/2–		
^{167m}Os	434.3(11) keV			2010	0.672(7) μs	IT	^{167}Os	13/2+		
^{168}Os	76	92	167.967799(11)	1977	2.1(1) s	β^{+} (57%)	^{168}Re	0+		
^{168}Os	76	92	167.967799(11)	1977	2.1(1) s	α (43%)	^{164}W	0+		
^{169}Os	76	93	168.967018(28)	1972	3.46(11) s	β^{+} (86.3%)	^{169}Re	(5/2–)		
^{169}Os	76	93	168.967018(28)	1972	3.46(11) s	α (13.7%)	^{165}W	(5/2–)		
^{170}Os	76	94	169.963579(10)	1972	7.37(18) s	β^{+} (90.5%)	^{170}Re	0+		
^{170}Os	76	94	169.963579(10)	1972	7.37(18) s	α (9.5%)	^{166}W	0+		
^{171}Os	76	95	170.963180(20)	1972	8.3(2) s	β^{+} (98.20%)	^{171}Re	(5/2−)		
^{171}Os	76	95	170.963180(20)	1972	8.3(2) s	α (1.80%)	^{167}W	(5/2−)		
^{171m1}Os	186.32(13) keV			2023	790(16) ms	β^{+} (~64(6)%)	^{171}Re	(13/2+)		
^{171m1}Os	186.32(13) keV			2023	790(16) ms	IT (36(6)%)	^{171}Os	(13/2+)		
^{171m1}Os	186.32(13) keV			2023	790(16) ms	α (0.21(5)%)	^{167}W	(13/2+)		
^{172}Os	76	96	171.960017(14)	1971	19.2(9) s	β^{+} (98.81%)	^{172}Re	0+		
^{172}Os	76	96	171.960017(14)	1971	19.2(9) s	α (1.19%)	^{168}W	0+		
^{173}Os	76	97	172.959808(16)	1971	22.4(9) s	β^{+} (99.6%)	^{173}Re	5/2–		
^{173}Os	76	97	172.959808(16)	1971	22.4(9) s	α (0.4%)	^{169}W	5/2–		
^{174}Os	76	98	173.957063(11)	1971	44(4) s	β^{+} (99.976%)	^{174}Re	0+		
^{174}Os	76	98	173.957063(11)	1971	44(4) s	α (0.024%)	^{170}W	0+		
^{175}Os	76	99	174.956945(13)	1972	1.4(1) min	β^{+}	^{175}Re	(5/2−)		
^{176}Os	76	100	175.954770(12)	1970	3.6(5) min	β^{+}	^{176}Re	0+		
^{177}Os	76	101	176.954958(16)	1970	3.0(2) min	β^{+}	^{177}Re	1/2−		
^{178}Os	76	102	177.953253(15)	1967	5.0(4) min	β^{+}	^{178}Re	0+		
^{179}Os	76	103	178.953816(17)	1968	6.5(3) min	β^{+}	^{179}Re	1/2–		
^{179m1}Os	145.41(12) keV			1983	~500 ns	IT	^{179}Os	(7/2)–		
^{179m2}Os	243.0(8) keV			1983	783(14) ns	IT	^{179}Os	(9/2)+		
^{180}Os	76	104	179.952382(17)	1966	21.5(4) min	β^{+}	^{180}Re	0+		
^{181}Os	76	105	180.953247(27)	1966	105(3) min	β^{+}	^{181}Re	1/2−		
^{181m1}Os	49.20(14) keV			1967	2.7(1) min	β^{+}	^{181}Re	7/2−		
^{181m2}Os	156.91(15) keV			1974	262(6) ns	IT	^{181}Os	9/2+		
^{182}Os	76	106	181.952110(23)	1950	21.84(20) h	EC	^{182}Re	0+		
^{182m1}Os	1831.4(3) keV			1965	780(70) μs	IT	^{182}Os	8–		
^{182m2}Os	7049.5(4) keV			1988	150(10) ns	IT	^{182}Os	25+		
^{183}Os	76	107	182.953125(53)	1950	13.0(5) h	β^{+}	^{183}Re	9/2+		
^{183m}Os	170.73(7) keV			1958	9.9(3) h	β^{+} (85%)	^{183}Re	1/2−		
^{183m}Os	170.73(7) keV			1958	9.9(3) h	IT (15%)	^{183}Os	1/2−		
^{184}Os (Note: primordial radionuclide)	76	108	183.95249292(89)	1937	1.12(23)×10^{13} y	α (Note: Theorized to also undergo β^{+}β^{+} decay to ^{184}W)	^{180}W	0+	2(2)×10^{−4}	
^{185}Os	76	109	184.95404597(89)	1947	92.95(9) d	EC	^{185}Re	1/2−		
^{185m1}Os	102.37(11) keV			1975	3.0(4) μs	IT	^{185}Os	7/2−		
^{185m2}Os	275.53(12) keV			1975	0.78(5) μs	IT	^{185}Os	11/2+		
^{186}Os	76	110	185.95383757(82)	1931	2.0(11)×10^{15} y	α	^{182}W	0+	0.0159(64)	
^{187}Os (Note: Used in rhenium-osmium dating)	76	111	186.95574957(79)	1931	Observationally Stable (Note: Believed to undergo α decay to ^{183}W with a half-life over 3.2×10^{15} years)			1/2−	0.0196(17)	
^{187m1}Os	100.45(4) keV			1971	112(6) ns	IT	^{187}Os	7/2−		
^{187m2}Os	257.10(7) keV			1964	231(2) μs	IT	^{187}Os	11/2+		
^{188}Os	76	112	187.95583729(79)	1931	Observationally Stable (Note: Believed to undergo α decay to ^{184}W with a half-life over 3.3×10^{18} years)			0+	0.1324(27)	
^{189}Os	76	113	188.95814595(72)	1931	Observationally Stable (Note: Believed to undergo α decay to ^{185}W with a half-life over 3.3×10^{15} years)			3/2−	0.1615(23)	
^{189m}Os	30.82(2) keV			1950	5.81(10) h	IT	^{189}Os	9/2−		
^{190}Os	76	114	189.95844544(70)	1931	Observationally Stable (Note: Believed to undergo α decay to ^{186}W with a half-life over 1.2×10^{19} years)			0+	0.2626(20)	
^{190m}Os	1705.7(1) keV			1950	9.86(3) min	IT	^{190}Os	10−		
^{191}Os	76	115	190.96092811(71)	1940	14.99(2) d	β^{−}	^{191}Ir	9/2−		
^{191m}Os	74.382(3) keV			1952	13.10(5) h	IT	^{191}Os	3/2−		
^{192}Os	76	116	191.9614788(25)	1931	Observationally Stable (Note: Believed to undergo α decay to ^{188}W or β^{−}β^{−} decay to ^{192}Pt with a half-life over 5.3×10^{19} years)			0+	0.4078(32)	
^{192m1}Os	2015.40(11) keV			1973	5.94(9) s	IT	^{192}Os	10−		
^{192m1}Os	2015.40(11) keV			1973	5.94(9) s	β^{−}?	^{192}Ir	10−		
^{192m2}Os	4580.3(10) keV			2004	205(7) ns	IT	^{192}Os	(20+)		
^{193}Os	76	117	192.9641496(25)	1940	29.830(18) h	β^{−}	^{193}Ir	3/2−		
^{193m}Os	315.6(3) keV			2011	121(28) ns	IT	^{193}Os	(9/2−)		
^{194}Os	76	118	193.9651794(26)	1951	6.0(2) y	β^{−}	^{194}Ir	0+		
^{195}Os	76	119	194.968318(60)	1957	6.5(11) min	β^{−}	^{195}Ir	(3/2−)		
^{195m}Os	427.8(3) keV			2012	47(3) s	IT	^{195}Os	(13/2+)		
^{195m}Os	427.8(3) keV			2012	47(3) s	β^{−}?	^{195}Ir	(13/2+)		
^{196}Os	76	120	195.969643(43)	1977	34.9(2) min	β^{−}	^{196}Ir	0+		
^{197}Os	76	121	196.97308(22)#	2003	93(7) s	β^{−}	^{197}Ir	5/2−#		
^{198}Os	76	122	197.97466(22)#	2008	125(28) s	β^{−}	^{198}Ir	0+		
^{199}Os	76	123	198.97824(22)#	2008	6(3) s	β^{−}	^{199}Ir	5/2−#		
^{200}Os	76	124	199.98009(32)#	2011	7(4) s	β^{−}	^{200}Ir	0+		
^{201}Os	76	125	200.98407(32)#	2011	3# s [>300 ns]	β^{−}?	^{201}Ir	1/2−#		
^{202}Os	76	126	201.98655(43)#	2012	2# s [>300 ns]	β^{−}?	^{202}Ir	0+		
^{203}Os	76	127	202.99220(43)#	2012	300# ms [>300 ns]	β^{−}?	^{203}Ir	9/2+#		
^{203}Os	76	127	202.99220(43)#	2012	300# ms [>300 ns]	β^{−} n?	^{202}Ir	9/2+#		
This table header & footer:

== See also ==
Daughter products other than osmium

- Isotopes of iridium
- Isotopes of rhenium
- Isotopes of tungsten
