= Isotopes of platinum =

Isotopes of platinum (_{78}Pt)
Main isotopes			Decay	
Isotope	abundance	half-life (t_{1/2})	mode	product
^{190}Pt	0.0120%	4.83×10^{11} y	α	^{186}Os
^{191}Pt	synth	2.83 d	ε	^{191}Ir
^{192}Pt	0.782%	stable		
^{193}Pt	synth	50 y	ε	^{193}Ir
^{194}Pt	32.9%	stable		
^{195}Pt	33.8%	stable		
^{196}Pt	25.2%	stable		
^{198}Pt	7.36%	stable		

Standard atomic weight A_{r}°(Pt)
- 195.084±0.009; 195.08±0.02 (abridged)

Naturally occurring platinum (_{78}Pt) consists of five stable isotopes (^{192}Pt, ^{194}Pt, ^{195}Pt, ^{196}Pt, ^{198}Pt) and one long-lived (half-life 4.83×10^{11} years) radioisotope (^{190}Pt). There are also 34 known synthetic radioisotopes ranging from ^{165}Pt to ^{204}Pt, and longest-lived of those is ^{193}Pt with a half-life of 50 years. All the others have half-lives under two weeks, most under a day. There are numerous metastable states, of which the most stable are ^{193m}Pt and ^{195m}Pt with half-lives 4.33 and 4.010 days, decaying to their ground states.

Despite the obstacles to measurement with rare isotopes of rare elements, with a very slow decay, the ^{190}Pt/^{186}Os system has been used in isotope geology, though not directly for dating.

All isotopes of platinum are either radioactive or observationally stable, meaning that they are predicted to be radioactive but no actual decay has been observed. Platinum-195 is the most abundant isotope, making platinum one of the only three elements to have its most abundant isotope with an odd neutron number (the other two being beryllium and nitrogen); however, it is so only by a small margin, unlike the other two, and is more in the nature of a coincidence.

== List of isotopes ==
Nuclide (Note: ^{m}Pt – Excited nuclear isomer.)	Z	N	Isotopic mass (Da) (Note: ( ) – Uncertainty (1σ) is given in concise form in parentheses after the corresponding last digits.) (Note: # – Atomic mass marked #: value and uncertainty derived not from purely experimental data, but at least partly from trends from the Mass Surface (TMS).)	Discovery year	Half-life (Note: Bold half-life – nearly stable, half-life longer than age of universe.)	Decay mode (Note: Modes of decay: EC: / Electron capture; IT: / Isomeric transition)	Daughter isotope (Note: Bold italics symbol as daughter – Daughter product is nearly stable.) (Note: Bold symbol as daughter – Daughter product is stable.)	Spin and parity (Note: ( ) spin value – Indicates spin with weak assignment arguments.) (Note: # – Values marked # are not purely derived from experimental data, but at least partly from trends of neighboring nuclides (TNN).)	Natural abundance (mole fraction)	
Nuclide	Excitation energy			Discovery year	Half-life	Decay mode	Daughter isotope	Spin and parity	Normal proportion	Range of variation
^{165}Pt	78	87	164.99966(43)#	2019	370(180) μs	α	^{161}Os	7/2−#		
^{166}Pt	78	88	165.99487(32)#	1996	294(62) μs	α	^{162}Os	0+		
^{167}Pt	78	89	166.99275(33)#	1996	920(120) μs	α	^{163}Os	7/2−#		
^{168}Pt	78	90	167.98818(16)	1981	2.02(10) ms	α	^{164}Os	0+		
^{168}Pt	78	90	167.98818(16)	1981	2.02(10) ms	β^{+} ?	^{168}Ir	0+		
^{169}Pt	78	91	168.98662(22)#	1981	6.99(9) ms	α	^{165}Os	(7/2−)		
^{169}Pt	78	91	168.98662(22)#	1981	6.99(9) ms	β^{+} ?	^{169}Ir	(7/2−)		
^{170}Pt	78	92	169.982502(20)	1981	13.93(16) ms	α	^{166}Os	0+		
^{170}Pt	78	92	169.982502(20)	1981	13.93(16) ms	β^{+} ?	^{170}Ir	0+		
^{171}Pt	78	93	170.981249(87)	1981	45.5(25) ms	α (86%)	^{167}Os	7/2−		
^{171}Pt	78	93	170.981249(87)	1981	45.5(25) ms	β^{+} (14%)	^{171}Ir	7/2−		
^{171m}Pt	412.6(10) keV			2010	901(9) ns	IT	^{171}Pt	13/2+		
^{172}Pt	78	94	171.977341(11)	1981	97.6(13) ms	α (96%)	^{168}Os	0+		
^{172}Pt	78	94	171.977341(11)	1981	97.6(13) ms	β^{+} (4%)	^{172}Ir	0+		
^{173}Pt	78	95	172.976450(68)	1966	382(2) ms	α (86%)	^{169}Os	(5/2−)		
^{173}Pt	78	95	172.976450(68)	1966	382(2) ms	β^{+} (14%)	^{173}Ir	(5/2−)		
^{174}Pt	78	96	173.972820(11)	1966	862(8) ms	α (74.9%)	^{170}Os	0+		
^{174}Pt	78	96	173.972820(11)	1966	862(8) ms	β^{+} (25.1%)	^{174}Ir	0+		
^{175}Pt	78	97	174.972401(20)	1966	2.43(4) s	α (64%)	^{171}Os	(7/2−)		
^{175}Pt	78	97	174.972401(20)	1966	2.43(4) s	β^{+} (36%)	^{175}Ir	(7/2−)		
^{176}Pt	78	98	175.968938(14)	1966	6.33(15) s	β^{+} (60%)	^{176}Ir	0+		
^{176}Pt	78	98	175.968938(14)	1966	6.33(15) s	α (40%)	^{172}Os	0+		
^{177}Pt	78	99	176.968470(16)	1966	10.0(04) s	β^{+} (94.3%)	^{177}Ir	5/2−		
^{177}Pt	78	99	176.968470(16)	1966	10.0(04) s	α (5.7%)	^{173}Os	5/2−		
^{177m}Pt	147.5(4) keV			1979	2.35(4) μs	IT	^{177}Pt	1/2−		
^{178}Pt	78	100	177.965649(11)	1966	20.7(7) s	β^{+} (92.3%)	^{178}Ir	0+		
^{178}Pt	78	100	177.965649(11)	1966	20.7(7) s	α (7.7%)	^{174}Os	0+		
^{179}Pt	78	101	178.9653588(86)	1966	21.2(4) s	β^{+} (99.76%)	^{179}Ir	1/2−		
^{179}Pt	78	101	178.9653588(86)	1966	21.2(4) s	α (0.24%)	^{175}Os	1/2−		
^{180}Pt	78	102	179.963038(11)	1966	56(3) s	β^{+} (99.48%)	^{180}Ir	0+		
^{180}Pt	78	102	179.963038(11)	1966	56(3) s	α (0.52%)	^{176}Os	0+		
^{181}Pt	78	103	180.963090(15)	1966	52.0(22) s	β^{+} (99.93%)	^{181}Ir	1/2−		
^{181}Pt	78	103	180.963090(15)	1966	52.0(22) s	α (0.074%)	^{177}Os	1/2−		
^{181m1}Pt	116.65(8) keV			1976	>300 ns	IT	^{181}Pt	7/2−		
^{181m2}Pt	275.99(10) keV			1990	99(9) ns	IT	^{181}Pt	(9/2+)		
^{182}Pt	78	104	181.961172(14)	1963	2.67(12) min	β^{+} (99.962%)	^{182}Ir	0+		
^{182}Pt	78	104	181.961172(14)	1963	2.67(12) min	α (0.038%)	^{178}Os	0+		
^{183}Pt	78	105	182.961596(15)	1963	6.5(10) min	β^{+} (99.99%)	^{183}Ir	1/2−		
^{183}Pt	78	105	182.961596(15)	1963	6.5(10) min	α (0.0096%)	^{179}Os	1/2−		
^{183m1}Pt	34.74(7) keV			1979	43(5) s	β^{+} (96.9%)	^{183}Ir	7/2−		
^{183m1}Pt	34.74(7) keV			1979	43(5) s	IT (3.1%)	^{183}Pt	7/2−		
^{183m1}Pt	34.74(7) keV			1979	43(5) s	α ?	^{179}Os	7/2−		
^{183m2}Pt	195.90(10) keV			1984	>150 ns	IT	^{183}Pt	9/2+		
^{184}Pt	78	106	183.959922(16)	1963	17.3(2) min	β^{+}	^{184}Ir	0+		
^{184}Pt	78	106	183.959922(16)	1963	17.3(2) min	α (0.0017%)	^{180}Os	0+		
^{184m}Pt	1840.3(8) keV			1966	1.01(5) ms	IT	^{184}Pt	8−		
^{185}Pt	78	107	184.960614(28)	1960	70.9(24) min	β^{+}	^{185}Ir	9/2+		
^{185}Pt	78	107	184.960614(28)	1960	70.9(24) min	α (0.0050%)	^{181}Os	9/2+		
^{185m1}Pt	103.41(5) keV			1979	33.0(8) min	β^{+}	^{185}Ir	1/2−		
^{185m2}Pt	200.89(4) keV			1996	728(20) ns	IT	^{185}Pt	5/2−		
^{186}Pt	78	108	185.959351(23)	1960	2.08(5) h	β^{+}	^{186}Ir	0+		
^{186}Pt	78	108	185.959351(23)	1960	2.08(5) h	α (1.4×10^{−4}%)	^{182}Os	0+		
^{187}Pt	78	109	186.960617(26)	1960	2.35(3) h	β^{+}	^{187}Ir	3/2−		
^{187m}Pt	174.38(22) keV			1976	311(15) μs	IT	^{187}Pt	11/2+		
^{188}Pt	78	110	187.9593975(57)	1954	10.16(18) d	EC	^{188}Ir	0+		
^{188}Pt	78	110	187.9593975(57)	1954	10.16(18) d	α (2.6×10^{−5}%)	^{184}Os	0+		
^{189}Pt	78	111	188.960848(11)	1955	10.87(12) h	β^{+}	^{189}Ir	3/2−		
^{189m1}Pt	172.79(6) keV			1969	464(25) ns	IT	^{189}Pt	9/2−		
^{189m2}Pt	191.6(4) keV			1976	143(5) μs	IT	^{189}Pt	(13/2+)		
^{190}Pt	78	112	189.95994982(71)	1949	4.83(3)×10^{11} y	α (Note: Theorized to also undergo β^{+}β^{+} decay to ^{190}Os)	^{186}Os	0+	1.2(2)×10^{−4}	
^{191}Pt	78	113	190.9616763(44)	1948	2.83(2) d	EC	^{191}Ir	3/2−		
^{191m1}Pt	100.663(20) keV			1976	>1 μs	IT	^{191}Pt	9/2−		
^{191m2}Pt	149.035(22) keV			1967	95(5) μs	IT	^{191}Pt	13/2+		
^{192}Pt	78	114	191.9610427(28)	1935	Observationally Stable (Note: Believed to undergo α decay to ^{188}Os with a half-life over 6.0×10^{16} years)			0+	0.00782(24)	
^{192m}Pt	2172.37(13) keV			1976	272(23) ns	IT	^{192}Pt	10−		
^{193}Pt	78	115	192.9629845(15)	1948	50(6) y	EC	^{193}Ir	1/2−		
^{193m}Pt	149.78(4) keV			1949	4.33(3) d	IT	^{193}Pt	13/2+		
^{194}Pt	78	116	193.96268350(53)	1935	Observationally Stable (Note: Believed to undergo α decay to ^{190}Os)			0+	0.3286(41)	
^{195}Pt	78	117	194.96479433(54)	1935	Observationally Stable (Note: Believed to undergo α decay to ^{191}Os with a half-life over 6.3×10^{18} years)			1/2−	0.3378(24)	
^{195m}Pt	259.077(23) keV			1952	4.010(5) d	IT	^{195}Pt	13/2+		
^{196}Pt	78	118	195.96495465(55)	1935	Observationally Stable (Note: Believed to undergo α decay to ^{192}Os)			0+	0.2521(34)	
^{197}Pt	78	119	196.96734303(58)	1936	19.8915(19) h	β^{−}	^{197}Au	1/2−		
^{197m}Pt	399.59(20) keV			1952	95.41(18) min	IT (96.7%)	^{197}Pt	13/2+		
^{197m}Pt	399.59(20) keV			1952	95.41(18) min	β^{−} (3.3%)	^{197}Au	13/2+		
^{198}Pt	78	120	197.9678967(23)	1935	Observationally Stable (Note: Believed to undergo α decay to ^{194}Os or double β^{−} decay to ^{198}Hg with a half-life over 3.20×10^{14} years)			0+	0.0734(13)	
^{199}Pt	78	121	198.9705970(23)	1937	30.80(21) min	β^{−}	^{199}Au	5/2−		
^{199m}Pt	424(2) keV			1959	13.48(16) s	IT	^{199}Pt	13/2+		
^{200}Pt	78	122	199.971445(22)	1957	12.6(3) h	β^{−}	^{200}Au	0+		
^{201}Pt	78	123	200.974513(54)	1962	2.5(1) min	β^{−}	^{201}Au	(5/2−)		
^{202}Pt	78	124	201.975639(27)	1992	44(15) h	β^{−}	^{202}Au	0+		
^{202m}Pt	1788.5(4) keV			2005	141(7) μs	IT	^{202}Pt	(7−)		
^{203}Pt	78	125	202.97906(22)#	2008	22(4) s	β^{−}	^{203}Au	(1/2−)		
^{203m1}Pt	1367(3)# keV			2013	12(5) s	β^{−}	^{203}Au	13/2+#		
^{203m1}Pt	1367(3)# keV			2013	12(5) s	IT ?	^{203}Pt	13/2+#		
^{203m2}Pt	1420(50)# keV			(2008) (Note: Half-life not measured, not included in discovery database)	>100# ns	IT	^{203}Pt	27/2−#		
^{203m3}Pt	2530(50)# keV			2011	641(55) ns	IT	^{203}Pt	33/2+#		
^{204}Pt	78	126	203.98108(22)#	2008	10.3(14) s	β^{−}	^{204}Au	0+		
^{204m1}Pt	1995.1(07) keV			2008	5.5(7) μs	IT	^{204}Pt	(5−)		
^{204m2}Pt	2035(23) keV			2008	55(3) μs	IT	^{204}Pt	(7−)		
^{204m3}Pt	3193(23) keV			2008	146(14) ns	IT	^{204}Pt	(10+)		
^{205}Pt	78	127	204.98624(32)#	2010	2# s	β^{−} ?	^{205}Au	9/2+#		
^{206}Pt	78	128	205.99008(32)#	2012	500# ms	β^{−} ?	^{206}Au	0+		
^{206}Pt	78	128	205.99008(32)#	2012	500# ms	β^{−}n ?	^{205}Au	0+		
^{207}Pt	78	129	206.99556(43)#	2012	600# ms	β^{−} ?	^{207}Au	9/2+#		
^{207}Pt	78	129	206.99556(43)#	2012	600# ms	β^{−}n ?	^{206}Au	9/2+#		
^{208}Pt	78	130	207.99946(43)#	2012	220# ms	β^{−} ?	^{208}Au	0+		
^{208}Pt	78	130	207.99946(43)#	2012	220# ms	β^{−}n ?	^{207}Au	0+		
This table header & footer:

== See also ==
Daughter products other than platinum

- Isotopes of gold
- Isotopes of iridium
- Isotopes of osmium
