= Isotopes of iridium =

Isotopes of iridium (_{77}Ir)
Main isotopes			Decay	
Isotope	abundance	half-life (t_{1/2})	mode	product
^{189}Ir	synth	13.2 d	ε	^{189}Os
^{190}Ir	synth	11.751 d	ε	^{190}Os
^{191}Ir	37.3%	stable		
^{192}Ir	synth	73.82 d	β^{−}	^{192}Pt
^{192}Ir	synth	73.82 d	ε	^{192}Os
^{192m2}Ir	synth	241 y	IT	^{192}Ir
^{193}Ir	62.7%	stable		

Standard atomic weight A_{r}°(Ir)
- 192.217±0.002; 192.22±0.01 (abridged)

There are two natural isotopes of iridium (_{77}Ir), ^{191}Ir and ^{193}Ir, both stable. In addition, there are 40 known radioisotopes with mass numbers 164 through 205, the most stable being ^{192}Ir with a half-life of 73.82 days, and many nuclear isomers, the most stable of which is ^{192m2}Ir with a half-life of 241 years. All other nuclides have half-lives under two weeks, most under a day. All isotopes of iridium are either radioactive or observationally stable, meaning that they are predicted to be radioactive but no actual decay has been observed.

The isotope ^{191}Ir was the first one of any element to be shown to present a Mössbauer effect. This renders it useful for Mössbauer spectroscopy for research in physics, chemistry, biochemistry, metallurgy, and mineralogy.

== List of isotopes ==
Nuclide (Note: ^{m}Ir – Excited nuclear isomer.)	Z	N	Isotopic mass (Da) (Note: ( ) – Uncertainty (1σ) is given in concise form in parentheses after the corresponding last digits.) (Note: # – Atomic mass marked #: value and uncertainty derived not from purely experimental data, but at least partly from trends from the Mass Surface (TMS).)	Discovery year	Half-life (Note: # – Values marked # are not purely derived from experimental data, but at least partly from trends of neighboring nuclides (TNN).)	Decay mode (Note: Modes of decay: α: / Alpha decay; β^{+}: / Positron emission; EC: / Electron capture; β^{−}: / Beta decay; IT: / Isomeric transition; p: / Proton emission)	Daughter isotope (Note: Bold italics symbol as daughter – Daughter product is nearly stable.) (Note: Bold symbol as daughter – Daughter product is stable.)	Spin and parity (Note: ( ) spin value – Indicates spin with weak assignment arguments.)	Natural abundance (mole fraction)	
Nuclide	Excitation energy			Discovery year	Half-life	Decay mode	Daughter isotope	Spin and parity	Normal proportion	Range of variation
^{164}Ir (Note: Discovery of this isotope is unconfirmed)	77	87	163.99197#(34)	2014	<0.5 μs	p?	^{163}Os	2#		
^{164m}Ir	260(100) keV			2014	70(10) μs	p (96%)	^{163}Os	(9+)		
^{164m}Ir	260(100) keV			2014	70(10) μs	α (4%)	^{160m}Re	(9+)		
^{165}Ir	77	88	165.98572#(22)	1997	1.20+0.82 −0.74 μs	p	^{164}Os	(1/2+)		
^{165m}Ir	~255 keV			1997	340(40) μs	p (88%)	^{164}Os	(11/2)		
^{165m}Ir	~255 keV			1997	340(40) μs	α (12%)	^{161m}Re	(11/2)		
^{166}Ir	77	89	165.98582#(22)	1981	10.5(22) ms	α (93%)	^{162}Re	(2)		
^{166}Ir	77	89	165.98582#(22)	1981	10.5(22) ms	p (7%)	^{165}Os	(2)		
^{166m}Ir	171(6) keV			1997	15.1(9) ms	α (98.2%)	^{162}Re	(9)+		
^{166m}Ir	171(6) keV			1997	15.1(9) ms	p (1.8%)	^{165}Os	(9)+		
^{167}Ir	77	90	166.981672(20)	1981	29.3(6) ms	α (43.5%)	^{163}Re	1/2+		
^{167}Ir	77	90	166.981672(20)	1981	29.3(6) ms	p (38.6%)	^{166}Os	1/2+		
^{167}Ir	77	90	166.981672(20)	1981	29.3(6) ms	β^{+} (17.9%)	^{167}Os	1/2+		
^{167m}Ir	175.5(21) keV			1997	28.5(5) ms	α (89%)	^{163}Re	11/2		
^{167m}Ir	175.5(21) keV			1997	28.5(5) ms	β^{+} (11%)	^{167}Os	11/2		
^{167m}Ir	175.5(21) keV			1997	28.5(5) ms	p (0.41%)	^{166}Os	11/2		
^{168}Ir	77	91	167.979961(59)	1978	230(50) ms	α	^{164}Re	(2)-		
^{168m}Ir (Note: Order of ground state and isomer is uncertain.)	40(250) keV			1996	163(16) ms	α (77%)	^{164}Re	(9,10)+		
^{168m}Ir	40(250) keV			1996	163(16) ms	β^{+}?	^{168}Os	(9,10)+		
^{168m}Ir	40(250) keV			1996	163(16) ms	β^{+}, p?	^{167}Re	(9,10)+		
^{169}Ir	77	92	168.976282(25)	1978	353(4) ms	α (53%)	^{165}Re	(1/2+)		
^{169}Ir	77	92	168.976282(25)	1978	353(4) ms	β^{+} (47%)	^{169}Os	(1/2+)		
^{169m}Ir	153(22) keV			1999	280(1) ms	α (79%)	^{165}Re	(11/2)		
^{169m}Ir	153(22) keV			1999	280(1) ms	β^{+}?	^{169}Os	(11/2)		
^{169m}Ir	153(22) keV			1999	280(1) ms	p?	^{168}Os	(11/2)		
^{170}Ir	77	93	169.97511#(11)	1977	910(150) ms	β^{+} (94.8%)	^{170}Os	(3)		
^{170}Ir	77	93	169.97511#(11)	1977	910(150) ms	α (5.2%)	^{166}Re	(3)		
^{170m}Ir	40(50)#keV			2002	811(18) ms	α (38%)	^{166}Re	(8+)		
^{170m}Ir	40(50)#keV			2002	811(18) ms	β^{+}?	^{170}Os	(8+)		
^{170m}Ir	40(50)#keV			2002	811(18) ms	IT?	^{170}Ir	(8+)		
^{171}Ir	77	94	170.971646(41)	1967	3.1(3) s	β^{+} (85%)	^{171}Os	1/2+		
^{171}Ir	77	94	170.971646(41)	1967	3.1(3) s	α (15%)	^{167}Re	1/2+		
^{171m}Ir	164(11)#keV			2002	1.47(6) s	α (54%)	^{167}Re	(11/2)		
^{171m}Ir	164(11)#keV			2002	1.47(6) s	β^{+}?	^{171}Os	(11/2)		
^{171m}Ir	164(11)#keV			2002	1.47(6) s	p?	^{170}Os	(11/2)		
^{172}Ir	77	95	171.970607(35)	1967	4.4(3) s	β^{+} (~98%)	^{172}Os	(3,4)		
^{172}Ir	77	95	171.970607(35)	1967	4.4(3) s	α (~2%)	^{168}Re	(3,4)		
^{172m}Ir	139(10) keV			1992	2.19(7) s	β^{+} (90.5%)	^{172}Os	(7+)		
^{172m}Ir	139(10) keV			1992	2.19(7) s	α (9.5%)	^{168}Re	(7+)		
^{173}Ir	77	96	172.967505(11)	1967	9.0(8) s	β^{+} (96.5%)	^{173}Os	(1/2+,3/2+)		
^{173}Ir	77	96	172.967505(11)	1967	9.0(8) s	α (3.5%)	^{169}Re	(1/2+,3/2+)		
^{173m}Ir	226(9) keV			1992	2.20(5) s	β^{+} (88%)	^{173}Os	11/2		
^{173m}Ir	226(9) keV			1992	2.20(5) s	α (12%)	^{169}Re	11/2		
^{174}Ir	77	97	173.966950(12)	1967	7.9(6) s	β^{+} (99.5%)	^{174}Os	(2+,3)		
^{174}Ir	77	97	173.966950(12)	1967	7.9(6) s	α (0.5%)	^{170}Re	(2+,3)		
^{174m}Ir	124(16) keV			1992	4.9(3) s	β^{+} (97.5%)	^{174}Os	(6,7,8,9)		
^{174m}Ir	124(16) keV			1992	4.9(3) s	α (2.5%)	^{170}Re	(6,7,8,9)		
^{175}Ir	77	98	174.964150(13)	1967	9(2) s	β^{+} (99.15%)	^{175}Os	(1/2+)		
^{175}Ir	77	98	174.964150(13)	1967	9(2) s	α (0.85%)	^{171}Re	(1/2+)		
^{175m1}Ir	50(40) keV			2010	33(4) s	β^{+}	^{175}Os	9/2#		
^{175m2}Ir	97.4(7) keV			2019	6.58(15) μs	IT	^{175}Ir	(5/2)		
^{176}Ir	77	99	175.9636263(87)	1967	8.7(5) s	β^{+} (96.9%)	^{176}Os	(3+)		
^{176}Ir	77	99	175.9636263(87)	1967	8.7(5) s	α (3.1%)	^{172}Re	(3+)		
^{177}Ir	77	100	176.961302(21)	1967	29.8(17) s	β^{+} (99.94%)	^{177}Os	5/2		
^{177}Ir	77	100	176.961302(21)	1967	29.8(17) s	α (0.06%)	^{173}Re	5/2		
^{177m}Ir	180.9(4) keV			(1991) (Note: Half-life not measured, not included in discovery database)	>100 ns	IT	^{177}Ir	(5/2+)		
^{178}Ir	77	101	177.961079(20)	1972	12(2) s	β^{+}	^{178}Os	3+#		
^{179}Ir	77	102	178.959118(10)	1992	79(1) s	β^{+}	^{179}Os	(5/2)		
^{180}Ir	77	103	179.959229(23)	1972	1.5(1) min	β^{+}	^{180}Os	(5+)		
^{181}Ir	77	104	180.9576347(56)	1972	4.90(15) min	β^{+}	^{181}Os	5/2		
^{181m1}Ir	289.33(13) keV			1992	298 ns	IT	^{181}Ir	5/2+		
^{181m2}Ir	366.30(22) keV			1990	126(6) ns	IT	^{181}Ir	9/2		
^{182}Ir	77	105	181.958076(23)	1961	15.0(10) min	β^{+}	^{182}Os	3+		
^{182m1}Ir	71.02(17) keV			1990	170(40) ns	IT	^{182}Ir	(5)+		
^{182m2}Ir	176.4(3) keV			1990	130(50) ns	IT	^{182}Ir	(6)		
^{183}Ir	77	106	182.956841(26)	1961	58(5) min	β^{+}	^{183}Os	5/2		
^{184}Ir	77	107	183.957476(30)	1960	3.09(3) h	β^{+}	^{184}Os	5		
^{184m1}Ir	225.65(11) keV			1988	470(30) μs	IT	^{184}Ir	3+		
^{184m2}Ir	328.40(24) keV			1988	350(90) ns	IT	^{184}Ir	7+		
^{185}Ir	77	108	184.956698(30)	1958	14.4(1) h	β^{+}	^{185}Os	5/2		
^{185m}Ir	2197(23) keV			1979	120(20) ns	IT	^{185}Ir	(23/2,25/2)#		
^{186}Ir	77	109	185.957947(18)	1958	16.64(3) h	β^{+}	^{186}Os	5+		
^{186m}Ir	0.8(4) keV			1962	1.92(5) h	β^{+} (~75%)	^{186}Os	2		
^{186m}Ir	0.8(4) keV			1962	1.92(5) h	IT (~25%)	^{186}Ir	2		
^{187}Ir	77	110	186.957542(30)	1958	10.5(3) h	β^{+}	^{187}Os	3/2+		
^{187m1}Ir	186.16(4) keV			1963	30.3(6) ms	IT	^{187}Ir	9/2		
^{187m2}Ir	433.75(6) keV			1969	152(12) ns	IT	^{187}Ir	11/2		
^{187m3}Ir	2487.7(4) keV			2010	1.8(5) μs	IT	^{187}Ir	29/2		
^{188}Ir	77	111	187.958835(10)	1950	41.5(5) h	β^{+}	^{188}Os	1		
^{188m}Ir	964(23) keV			1971	4.15(15) ms	IT	^{188}Ir	11#		
^{189}Ir	77	112	188.958723(14)	1955	13.2(1) d	EC	^{189}Os	3/2+		
^{189m1}Ir	372.17(4) keV			1963	13.3(3) ms	IT	^{189}Ir	11/2		
^{189m2}Ir	2332.8(3) keV			1975	3.7(2) ms	IT	^{189}Ir	25/2+		
^{190}Ir	77	113	189.9605434(15)	1947	11.7511(20) d	EC	^{190}Os	4		
^{190}Ir	77	113	189.9605434(15)	1947	11.7511(20) d	β^{+} (<0.002%)	^{190}Os	4		
^{190m1}Ir	26.1(1) keV			1964	1.120(3) h	IT	^{190}Ir	1		
^{190m2}Ir	36.154(25) keV			1996	>2 μs	IT	^{190}Ir	4+		
^{190m3}Ir	376.4(1) keV			1950	3.087(12) h	EC (91.4%)	^{190}Os	11		
^{190m3}Ir	376.4(1) keV			1950	3.087(12) h	IT (8.6%)	^{190}Ir	11		
^{191}Ir	77	114	190.9605915(14)	1935	Observationally Stable (Note: Believed to undergo α decay to ^{187}Re)			3/2+	0.373(2)	
^{191m1}Ir	171.29(4) keV			1954	4.899(23) s	IT	^{191}Ir	11/2		
^{191m2}Ir	2101.0(9) keV			2012	5.7(4) s	IT	^{191}Ir	31/2(+)		
^{192}Ir	77	115	191.9626024(14)	1937	73.820(14) d	β^{−} (95.24%)	^{192}Pt	4+		
^{192}Ir	77	115	191.9626024(14)	1937	73.820(14) d	EC (4.76%)	^{192}Os	4+		
^{192m1}Ir	56.720(5) keV			1947	1.45(5) min	IT (99.98%)	^{192}Ir	1		
^{192m1}Ir	56.720(5) keV			1947	1.45(5) min	β^{−} (0.0175%)	^{192}Pt	1		
^{192m2}Ir	168.14(12) keV			1959	241(9) y	IT	^{192}Ir	(11)		
^{193}Ir	77	116	192.9629238(14)	1935	Observationally Stable (Note: Believed to undergo α decay to ^{189}Re)			3/2+	0.627(2)	
^{193m1}Ir	80.238(6) keV			1957	10.53(4) d	IT	^{193}Ir	11/2		
^{193m2}Ir	2278.9(5) keV			2012	124.8(21) μs	IT	^{193}Ir	31/2+		
^{194}Ir	77	117	193.9650757(14)	1937	19.35(7) h	β^{−}	^{194}Pt	1		
^{194m1}Ir	147.072(2) keV			1959	31.85(24) ms	IT	^{194}Ir	4+		
^{194m2}Ir	370(70) keV			1968	171(11) d	β^{−}	^{194}Pt	(11)		
^{195}Ir	77	118	194.9659769(14)	1952	2.29(17) h	β^{−}	^{195}Pt	3/2+		
^{195m1}Ir	100(5) keV			1968	3.74(7) h	β^{−}	^{195}Pt	11/2		
^{195m2}Ir	2354(6) keV			2011	4.4(6) μs	IT	^{195}Ir	(27/2+)		
^{196}Ir	77	119	195.968400(41)	1966	52.0(11) s	β^{−}	^{196}Pt	(1,2)		
^{196m}Ir	210(40) keV			1967	1.40(2) h	β^{−}	^{196}Pt	11#		
^{197}Ir	77	120	196.969657(22)	1952	5.8(5) min	β^{−}	^{197}Pt	3/2+		
^{197m1}Ir	115(5) keV			(1978) (Note: Only published in a conference proceeding and not a refereed journal)	8.9(3) min	β^{−}	^{197}Pt	11/2		
^{197m2}Ir	1700(500)#keV			2005	30(8) μs	IT	^{197}Ir			
^{197m3}Ir	2800(500)#keV			2005	15(9) μs	IT	^{197}Ir			
^{198}Ir	77	121	197.97240#(22)	1973	8.7(4) s	β^{−}	^{198}Pt	1		
^{199}Ir	77	122	198.973807(44)	1993	7(5) s	β^{−}	^{199}Pt	3/2+#		
^{200}Ir	77	123	199.97684#(21)	2008	43(6) s	β^{−}	^{200}Pt	(2, 3)		
^{201}Ir	77	124	200.97870#(22)	2008	21(5) s	β^{−}	^{201}Pt	(3/2+)		
^{202}Ir	77	125	201.98214#(32)	2008	11(3) s	β^{−}	^{202}Pt	(2)		
^{202m}Ir	2600(300)#keV			2011	3.4(6) μs	IT	^{202}Ir			
^{203}Ir	77	126	202.98457#(43)	2011	7# s [>300 ns]			3/2+#		
^{203m}Ir	2140(50)#keV			2011	798(350) ns	IT	^{203}Ir			
^{204}Ir	77	127	203.98973#(43)	2011	2# s [>300 ns]			3/2+#		
^{205}Ir	77	128	204.99399#(54)	2012	1# s [>300 ns]			3/2+#		
This table header & footer:

== Iridium-192 ==
Iridium-192 (symbol ^{192}Ir) is a radioactive isotope of iridium, with a half-life of 73.82 days. It decays by emitting beta (β) particles and gamma (γ) radiation. 95.24% of ^{192}Ir decays occur via β^{-} emission, leading to ^{192}Pt; the remaining 4.76% occur via electron capture to ^{192}Os; both modes involve gamma emission. Iridium-192 is normally produced by neutron activation of natural-abundance iridium metal.

Iridium-192 is used in brachytherapy and in industrial radiography, particularly for nondestructive testing of welds in steel in the oil and gas industries.

== See also ==
Daughter products other than iridium

- Isotopes of platinum
- Isotopes of osmium
- Isotopes of rhenium
