= Isotopes of rhenium =

Isotopes of rhenium (_{75}Re)
Main isotopes			Decay	
Isotope	abundance	half-life (t_{1/2})	mode	product
^{183}Re	synth	70 d	ε	^{183}W
^{184}Re	synth	35.4 d	β^{+}	^{184}W
^{184m}Re	synth	177.25 d	IT	^{184}Re
^{184m}Re	synth	177.25 d	β^{+}	^{184}W
^{185}Re	37.4%	stable		
^{186}Re	synth	3.7185 d	β^{−}	^{186}Os
^{186}Re	synth	3.7185 d	ε	^{186}W
^{186m}Re	synth	2×10^{5} y	IT	^{186}Re
^{187}Re	62.6%	4.16×10^{10} y	β^{−}	^{187}Os

Standard atomic weight A_{r}°(Re)
- 186.207±0.001; 186.21±0.01 (abridged)

Naturally occurring rhenium (_{75}Re) is 37.4% ^{185}Re, which is stable (although it is predicted to decay), and 62.6% ^{187}Re, which is unstable but has a very long half-life (4.16×10^{10} years). Among elements with a known stable isotope, only indium and tellurium similarly occur with a stable isotope in lower abundance than the long-lived radioactive isotope.

There are 36 other unstable isotopes recognized, the longest-lived of which are ^{183}Re with a half-life of 70 days, ^{184}Re with a half-life of 35.4 days, ^{186}Re with a half-life of 3.7185 days, ^{182}Re with a half-life of 64.2 hours, and ^{189}Re with a half-life of 24.3 hours. There are also numerous isomers, the longest-lived of which are ^{186m}Re with a half-life of 200,000 years and ^{184m}Re with a half-life of 177.25 days. All others have half-lives less than a day.

== List of isotopes ==
Nuclide (Note: ^{m}Re – Excited nuclear isomer.)	Z	N	Isotopic mass (Da) (Note: ( ) – Uncertainty (1σ) is given in concise form in parentheses after the corresponding last digits.) (Note: # – Atomic mass marked #: value and uncertainty derived not from purely experimental data, but at least partly from trends from the Mass Surface (TMS).)	Discovery year	Half-life (Note: Bold half-life – nearly stable, half-life longer than age of universe.) (Note: # – Values marked # are not purely derived from experimental data, but at least partly from trends of neighboring nuclides (TNN).)	Decay mode (Note: Modes of decay: α: / Alpha decay; β^{+}: / Positron emission; EC: / Electron capture; β^{−}: / Beta decay; IT: / Isomeric transition; p: / Proton emission)	Daughter isotope (Note: Bold italics symbol as daughter – Daughter product is nearly stable.) (Note: Bold symbol as daughter – Daughter product is stable.)	Spin and parity (Note: ( ) spin value – Indicates spin with weak assignment arguments.)	Natural abundance (mole fraction)	
Nuclide	Excitation energy			Discovery year	Half-life	Decay mode	Daughter isotope	Spin and parity	Normal proportion	Range of variation
^{159}Re	75	84	158.98411(33)#	2006	40# μs			1/2+#		
^{159m}Re	210(50)# keV			2006	20(4) μs	p (92.5%)	^{158}W	(11/2−)		
^{159m}Re	210(50)# keV			2006	20(4) μs	α (7.5%)	^{155}Ta	(11/2−)		
^{160}Re	75	85	159.98188(32)#	1992	611(7) μs	p (89%)	^{159}W	(4−)		
^{160}Re	75	85	159.98188(32)#	1992	611(7) μs	α (11%)	^{156}Ta	(4−)		
^{160m}Re	177(15) keV			2011	2.8(1) μs	IT	^{160}Re	(9+)		
^{161}Re	75	86	160.97762(16)	1979	440(1) μs	p	^{160}W	1/2+		
^{161m}Re	123.7(13) keV			1997	14.7(3) ms	α (93.0%)	^{157}Ta	11/2−		
^{161m}Re	123.7(13) keV			1997	14.7(3) ms	p (7.0%)	^{160}W	11/2−		
^{162}Re	75	87	161.97590(22)#	1979	107(13) ms	α (94%)	^{158}Ta	(2)−		
^{162}Re	75	87	161.97590(22)#	1979	107(13) ms	β^{+} (6%)	^{162}W	(2)−		
^{162m}Re	175(9) keV			1997	77(9) ms	α (91%)	^{158}Ta	(9)+		
^{162m}Re	175(9) keV			1997	77(9) ms	β^{+} (9%)	^{162}W	(9)+		
^{163}Re	75	88	162.972085(20)	1979	390(70) ms	β^{+} (68%)	^{163}W	1/2+		
^{163}Re	75	88	162.972085(20)	1979	390(70) ms	α (32%)	^{159}Ta	1/2+		
^{163m}Re	120(5) keV			1997	214(5) ms	α (66%)	^{159}Ta	11/2−		
^{163m}Re	120(5) keV			1997	214(5) ms	β^{+} (34%)	^{163}W	11/2−		
^{164}Re	75	89	163.970507(59)	1979	719(89) ms	α (?%)	^{160}Ta	(2)−		
^{164}Re	75	89	163.970507(59)	1979	719(89) ms	β^{+} (?%)	^{164}W	(2)−		
^{164m}Re (Note: Order of ground state and isomer is uncertain.)	−50(250) keV			2009	890(130) ms	β^{+} (97%)	^{164}W	(9,10)+		
^{164m}Re	−50(250) keV			2009	890(130) ms	α (3%)	^{160}Ta	(9,10)+		
^{165}Re	75	90	164.967086(25)	1981	1.6(6) s	β^{+} (86%)	^{165}W	(1/2+)		
^{165}Re	75	90	164.967086(25)	1981	1.6(6) s	α (14%)	^{161}Ta	(1/2+)		
^{165m}Re	28(22) keV			2012	1.74(6) s	β^{+} (87%)	^{165}W	(11/2−)		
^{165m}Re	28(22) keV			2012	1.74(6) s	α (13%)	^{161}Ta	(11/2−)		
^{166}Re	75	91	165.965821(95)	1978	2.25(21) s	β^{+}	^{166}W	(7+)		
^{166}Re	75	91	165.965821(95)	1978	2.25(21) s	α	^{162}Ta	(7+)		
^{167}Re	75	92	166.962604(43)#	1992	3.4(4) s	α (?%)	^{163}Ta	9/2−		
^{167}Re	75	92	166.962604(43)#	1992	3.4(4) s	β^{+} (?%)	^{167}W	9/2−		
^{167m}Re	131(13)# keV			1992	5.9(3) s	β^{+} (?%)	^{167}W	1/2+		
^{167m}Re	131(13)# keV			1992	5.9(3) s	α (?%)	^{163}Ta	1/2+		
^{168}Re	75	93	167.961573(33)	1992	4.4(1) s	β^{+}	^{168}W	(7+)		
^{168}Re	75	93	167.961573(33)	1992	4.4(1) s	α (0.005%)	^{164}Ta	(7+)		
^{169}Re	75	94	168.958766(12)	1978	8.1(5) s	β^{+}	^{169}W	(9/2−)		
^{169}Re	75	94	168.958766(12)	1978	8.1(5) s	α (0.005%)	^{165}Ta	(9/2−)		
^{169m}Re	175(13) keV			1984	15.1(15) s	β^{+} (?%)	^{169}W	(1/2+,3/2+)		
^{169m}Re	175(13) keV			1984	15.1(15) s	α (?%)	^{165}Ta	(1/2+,3/2+)		
^{170}Re	75	95	169.958235(12)	1974	>1# s	β^{+}	^{170}W	(8−,9−)#		
^{170m1}Re	73(17) keV			(2020) (Note: Not clear that this state is a different state from the ground state; not included in the discovery database.)	9.2(2) s	β^{+}	^{170}W	(5+)		
^{170m2}Re	210.1(1) keV			(2019) (Note: Only reported in a thesis and not a refereed journal; not included in the discovery database.)	130(10) ns	IT	^{170}Re	(6,7,8,9)		
^{171}Re	75	96	170.955716(30)	1987	15.2(4) s	β^{+}	^{171}W	(9/2−)		
^{172}Re	75	97	171.955376(38)	1972	55(5) s	β^{+}	^{172}W	(2+)		
^{172m}Re	110(50)# keV			1977	15(3) s	β^{+}	^{172}W	(7+)		
^{173}Re	75	98	172.953243(30)	1986	2.0(3) min	β^{+}	^{173}W	(5/2−)		
^{174}Re	75	99	173.953115(30)	1972	2.40(4) min	β^{+}	^{174}W	3+#		
^{174m}Re	100(50)# keV			2012	1# min [>1 μs]			7+#		
^{175}Re	75	100	174.951381(30)	1967	5.89(5) min	β^{+}	^{175}W	5/2−#		
^{176}Re	75	101	175.951623(30)	1967	5.3(3) min	β^{+}	^{176}W	(3+)		
^{177}Re	75	102	176.950328(30)	1957	14(1) min	β^{+}	^{177}W	5/2−		
^{177m}Re	84.70(10) keV			1972	50(10) μs	IT	^{177}Re	5/2+		
^{178}Re	75	103	177.950989(30)	1957	13.2(2) min	β^{+}	^{178}W	(3+)		
^{179}Re	75	104	178.949990(26)	1960	19.5(1) min	β^{+}	^{179}W	5/2+		
^{179m1}Re	65.35(9) keV			1972	95(25) μs	IT	^{179}Re	(5/2−)		
^{179m2}Re	1822(50)# keV			1989	408(12) ns	IT	^{179}Re	(23/2+)		
^{179m3}Re	5408.0(5) keV			2002	466(15) μs	IT	^{179}Re	(47/2+,49/2+)		
^{180}Re	75	105	179.950792(23)	1955	2.46(3) min	β^{+}	^{180}W	(1)−		
^{180m1}Re	90(30)# keV			(2005) (Note: Half-life shorter than 100ns, not included in discovery database)	>1# μs	IT	^{180}Re	(4+,5+)		
^{180m2}Re	3561(30)# keV			2005	9.0(7) μs	IT	^{180}Re	21−		
^{181}Re	75	106	180.950062(13)	1957	19.9(7) h	β^{+}	^{181}W	5/2+		
^{181m1}Re	262.91(11) keV			1967	156.7(19) ns	IT	^{181}Re	9/2−		
^{181m2}Re	1656.37(14) keV			1974	250(10) ns	IT	^{181}Re	21/2−		
^{181m3}Re	1880.57(16) keV			1969	11.5(9) μs	IT	^{181}Re	25/2+		
^{181m4}Re	3869.40(18) keV			2000	1.2(2) μs	IT	^{181}Re	(35/2−)		
^{182}Re	75	107	181.95121(11)	1950	64.2(5) h	β^{+}	^{182}W	7+		
^{182m1}Re	60(100) keV			1950	14.14(45) h	β^{+}	^{182}W	2+		
^{182m2}Re	296(100) keV			1969	585(30) ns	IT	^{182}Re	(2)−		
^{182m3}Re	521(100) keV			1984	0.78(9) μs	IT	^{182}Re	(4−)		
^{183}Re	75	108	182.9508213(86)	1950	70.0(14) d	EC	^{183}W	5/2+		
^{183m}Re	1907.21(15) keV			1966	1.04(4) ms	IT	^{183}Re	25/2+		
^{184}Re	75	109	183.9525281(46)	1940	35.4(7) d	β^{+}	^{184}W	3−		
^{184m}Re	188.0463(17) keV			1963	177.25(7) d	IT (74.5%)	^{184}Re	8+		
^{184m}Re	188.0463(17) keV			1963	177.25(7) d	β^{+} (25.5%)	^{184}W	8+		
^{185}Re	75	110	184.95295832(88)	1931	Observationally stable (Note: Believed to undergo α decay to ^{181}Ta)			5/2+	0.3740(5)	
^{185m}Re	2124.1(4) keV			1997	200(4) ns	IT	^{185}Re	25/2+		
^{186}Re	75	111	185.95498917(88)	1939	3.7185(5) d	β^{−} (92.53%)	^{186}Os	1−		
^{186}Re	75	111	185.95498917(88)	1939	3.7185(5) d	EC (7.47%)	^{186}W	1−		
^{186m}Re	148.2(5) keV			1972	~2.0×10^{5} y	IT (Note: Theoretically capable of β^{−} decay to ^{186}Os)	^{186}Re	(8+)		
^{187}Re (Note: primordial radionuclide) (Note: Used in rhenium–osmium dating)	75	112	186.95575222(79)	1931	4.16(2)×10^{10} y (Note: Instead undergoes Bound-state β^{−} decay with a half-life of 32.9 years when fully ionized)	β^{−} (Note: Theorized to also undergo α decay to ^{183}Ta)	^{187}Os	5/2+	0.6260(5)	
^{187m1}Re	206.2473(10) keV			1948	555.3(17) ns	IT	^{187}Re	9/2−		
^{187m2}Re	1682.0(6) keV			2003	354(62) ns	IT	^{187}Re	21/2+		
^{188}Re	75	113	187.95811366(79)	1939	17.005(3) h	β^{−}	^{188}Os	1−		
^{188m}Re	172.0848(24) keV			1953	18.59(4) min	IT	^{188}Re	6−		
^{189}Re	75	114	188.9592278(88)	1963	24.3(4) h	β^{−}	^{189}Os	5/2+		
^{189m}Re	1770.9(6) keV			2016	223(14) μs	IT	^{189}Re	29/2+		
^{190}Re	75	115	189.9618001(52)	1955	3.0(2) min	β^{−}	^{190}Os	(2)−		
^{190m}Re	204(10) keV			1962	3.1(2) h	β^{−} (54.4%)	^{190}Os	(6−)		
^{190m}Re	204(10) keV			1962	3.1(2) h	IT (45.6%)	^{190}Re	(6−)		
^{191}Re	75	116	190.963123(11)	1963	9.8(5) min	β^{−}	^{191}Os	(3/2+)		
^{191m}Re	1601.5(4) keV			2011	50.6(35) μs	IT	^{191}Re	25/2−		
^{192}Re	75	117	191.966088(76)	1965	15.4(5) s	β^{−}	^{192}Os	(0−)		
^{192m1}Re	159(1) keV			2005	88(8) μs	IT	^{192}Re			
^{192m2}Re	267(10) keV			2012	<500 ms					
^{193}Re	75	118	192.967545(42)	1999	3# min [>300 ns]			5/2+#		
^{193m}Re	146.0(2) keV			2005	69(6) μs	IT	^{193}Re	(9/2−)		
^{194}Re	75	119	193.97074(22)#	1999	5(1) s	β^{−}	^{194}Os	1−#		
^{194m1}Re	150(50)# keV			2011	45(18) μs	IT	^{194}Re	4−#		
^{194m2}Re	285(40) keV			2012	25(8) s	β^{−}	^{194}Os	11−#		
^{194m3}Re	833(33) keV			2012	100(10) s	β^{−}	^{194}Os			
^{195}Re	75	120	194.97256(32)#	2008	5(1) s	β^{−}	^{195}Os	5/2+#		
^{196}Re	75	121	195.97600(32)#	2008	2.4(15) s	β^{−}	^{196}Os			
^{196m}Re	120(40)# keV			2011	3.6(6) μs	IT	^{196}Re			
^{197}Re	75	122	196.97815(32)#	2011	400# ms [>300 ns]			5/2+#		
^{198}Re	75	123	197.98176(43)#	2012	1# s [>300 ns]					
^{199}Re	75	124	198.98419(43)#	2012	250# ms [>300 ns]			5/2+#		
^{200}Re	75	125		2026						
^{201}Re	75	126		2026						
This table header & footer:

== Rhenium-186 ==
Rhenium-186 is a low-energy beta emitter and radiopharmaceutical that is used to treat glioblastoma, is used in theranostic medicine and has been reported to be used in synoviorthesis. The maximum tissue penetration of ^{186}Re is 4.5mm, making it a promising candidate for therapy of tumors with millimeter to centimeter dimensions. It also emits a low-abundance gamma ray with an energy of 137keV, which make it useful for SPECT dosimetry studies and in-vivo imaging of radio-labelled biomolecules. A radiopharmaceutical containing ^{186}Re, tin, and HEDP was found to localize in painful skeletal metastasizes and ease pain for about 80% of patients.

== See also ==
Daughter products other than rhenium

- Isotopes of osmium
- Isotopes of tungsten
- Isotopes of tantalum
