= Isotopes of tungsten =

Isotopes of tungsten (_{74}W)
Main isotopes			Decay	
Isotope	abundance	half-life (t_{1/2})	mode	product
^{180}W	0.120%	1.59×10^{18} y	α	^{176}Hf
^{181}W	synth	120.96 d	ε	^{181}Ta
^{182}W	26.5%	stable		
^{183}W	14.3%	stable		
^{184}W	30.6%	stable		
^{185}W	synth	75.1 d	β^{−}	^{185}Re
^{186}W	28.4%	stable		
^{187}W	synth	23.81 h	β^{−}	^{187}Re
^{188}W	synth	69.77 d	β^{−}	^{188}Re

Standard atomic weight A_{r}°(W)
- 183.84±0.01; 183.84±0.01 (abridged)

Naturally occurring tungsten (_{74}W) consists of five isotopes. Four are considered stable (^{182}W, ^{183}W, ^{184}W, and ^{186}W) and one is slightly radioactive, ^{180}W, with an extremely long half-life of (1.59±0.05)×10^{18} years. This results in about two alpha decays of ^{180}W per gram of natural tungsten per year, so for most practical purposes, ^{180}W can be considered stable. The other naturally occurring isotopes are also capable of alpha decay and so only observationally stable.

Artificial radioisotopes of tungsten have been observed from ^{156}W to ^{197}W, the most stable of which are ^{181}W with a half-life of 120.96 days, ^{185}W with a half-life of 75.1 days, ^{188}W with a half-life of 69.77 days and ^{178}W with a half-life of 21.6 days. All of the remaining radioactive isotopes have half-lives less than one day, and most of these less than 8 minutes. The most stable known meta state is ^{179m1}W with half-life 6.40 minutes.

== List of isotopes ==
Nuclide (Note: ^{m}W – Excited nuclear isomer.)	Z	N	Isotopic mass (Da) (Note: ( ) – Uncertainty (1σ) is given in concise form in parentheses after the corresponding last digits.) (Note: # – Atomic mass marked #: value and uncertainty derived not from purely experimental data, but at least partly from trends from the Mass Surface (TMS).)	Discovery year	Half-life (Note: Bold half-life – nearly stable, half-life longer than age of universe.) (Note: # – Values marked # are not purely derived from experimental data, but at least partly from trends of neighboring nuclides (TNN).)	Decay mode (Note: Modes of decay: α: / Alpha decay; β^{+}: / Positron emission; EC: / Electron capture; β^{−}: / Beta decay; IT: / Isomeric transition)	Daughter isotope (Note: Bold italics symbol as daughter – Daughter product is nearly stable.) (Note: Bold symbol as daughter – Daughter product is stable.)	Spin and parity (Note: ( ) spin value – Indicates spin with weak assignment arguments.)	Natural abundance (mole fraction)	
Nuclide	Excitation energy			Discovery year	Half-life	Decay mode	Daughter isotope	Spin and parity	Normal proportion	Range of variation
^{156}W	74	82		2024	157+57 −34 ms	β^{+}	^{156}Ta	0+		
^{157}W	74	83	156.97886(43)#	2010	275(40) ms	β^{+}	^{157}Ta	(7/2−)		
^{158}W	74	84	157.97457(32)#	1981	1.43(18) ms	α	^{154}Hf	0+		
^{158m}W	1889(8) keV			1989	143(19) μs	α	^{154}Hf	(8+)		
^{159}W	74	85	158.97270(32)#	1981	8.2(7) ms	α (82%)	^{155}Hf	7/2−#		
^{160}W	74	86	159.96851(16)	1979	90(5) ms	α (87%)	^{156}Hf	0+		
^{160}W	74	86	159.96851(16)	1979	90(5) ms	β^{+} (13%)	^{160}Ta	0+		
^{161}W	74	87	160.96725(22)#	1973	409(16) ms	α (73%)	^{157}Hf	7/2−#		
^{161}W	74	87	160.96725(22)#	1973	409(16) ms	β^{+} (27%)	^{161}Ta	7/2−#		
^{162}W	74	88	161.963500(19)	1973	1.19(12) s	β^{+} (54.8%)	^{162}Ta	0+		
^{162}W	74	88	161.963500(19)	1973	1.19(12) s	α (45.2%)	^{158}Hf	0+		
^{163}W	74	89	162.962524(63)	1973	2.63(9) s	β^{+} (86%)	^{163}Ta	7/2−		
^{163}W	74	89	162.962524(63)	1973	2.63(9) s	α (14%)	^{159}Hf	7/2−		
^{163m}W	480.3(7) keV			2010	154(3) ns	IT	^{163}W	13/2+		
^{164}W	74	90	163.958952(10)	1973	6.3(2) s	β^{+} (96.2%)	^{164}Ta	0+		
^{164}W	74	90	163.958952(10)	1973	6.3(2) s	α (3.8%)	^{160}Hf	0+		
^{165}W	74	91	164.958281(28)	1975	5.1(5) s	β^{+}	^{165}Ta	(5/2−)		
^{166}W	74	92	165.955032(10)	1975	19.2(6) s	β^{+} (99.97%)	^{166}Ta	0+		
^{166}W	74	92	165.955032(10)	1975	19.2(6) s	α (0.035%)	^{162}Hf	0+		
^{167}W	74	93	166.954811(20)	1985	19.9(5) s	β^{+} (99.96%)	^{167}Ta	(5/2−)		
^{167}W	74	93	166.954811(20)	1985	19.9(5) s	α (0.04%)	^{163}Hf	(5/2−)		
^{168}W	74	94	167.951805(14)	1971	50.9(19) s	β^{+} (99.97%)	^{168}Ta	0+		
^{168}W	74	94	167.951805(14)	1971	50.9(19) s	α (0.032%)	^{164}Hf	0+		
^{169}W	74	95	168.951779(17)	1985	74(6) s	β^{+}	^{169}Ta	5/2−#		
^{170}W	74	96	169.949231(14)	1971	2.42(4) min	β^{+}(99%)	^{170}Ta	0+		
^{171}W	74	97	170.949451(30)	1983	2.38(4) min	β^{+}	^{171}Ta	(5/2−)		
^{172}W	74	98	171.947292(30)	1965	6.6(9) min	β^{+}	^{172}Ta	0+		
^{173}W	74	99	172.947689(30)	1963	7.6(2) min	β^{+}	^{173}Ta	5/2−		
^{174}W	74	100	173.946079(30)	1965	33.2(21) min	β^{+}	^{174}Ta	0+		
^{174m1}W	2267.8(4) keV			1978	158(3) ns	IT	^{174}W	8−		
^{174m2}W	3515.6(4) keV			2006	128(8) ns	IT	^{174}W	12+		
^{175}W	74	101	174.946717(30)	1963	35.2(6) min	β^{+}	^{175}Ta	(1/2−)		
^{175m}W	234.96(15) keV			1978	216(6) ns	IT	^{175}W	(7/2+)		
^{176}W	74	102	175.945634(30)	1950	2.5(1) h	EC	^{176}Ta	0+		
^{177}W	74	103	176.946643(30)	1950	132.4(20) min	β^{+}	^{177}Ta	1/2−		
^{178}W	74	104	177.945886(16)	1950	21.6(3) d	EC	^{178}Ta	0+		
^{178m}W	6572.7(3) keV			1995	220(10) ns	IT	^{178}W	25+		
^{179}W	74	105	178.947079(16)	1950	37.05(16) min	β^{+}	^{179}Ta	7/2−		
^{179m1}W	221.91(3) keV			1950	6.40(7) min	IT (99.71%)	^{179}W	1/2−		
^{179m1}W	221.91(3) keV			1950	6.40(7) min	β^{+} (0.29%)	^{179}Ta	1/2−		
^{179m2}W	1631.90(8) keV			1978	390(30) ns	IT	^{179}W	21/2+		
^{179m3}W	3348.41(14) keV			1978	750(80) ns	IT	^{179}W	35/2−		
^{180}W (Note: Primordial radionuclide)	74	106	179.9467133(15)	1937	1.59(5)×10^{18} y	α	^{176}Hf	0+	0.0012(1)	
^{180m1}W	1529.05(4) keV			1955	5.47(9) ms	IT	^{180}W	8−		
^{180m2}W	3264.7(3) keV			2002	2.33(19) μs	IT	^{180}W	14−		
^{181}W	74	107	180.9482187(16)	1947	120.956(19) d	EC	^{181}Ta	9/2+		
^{181m1}W	365.55(13) keV			1957	14.59(15) μs	IT	^{181}W	5/2−		
^{181m2}W	1653.0(3) keV			1973	200(13) ns	IT	^{181}W	21/2+		
^{182}W	74	108	181.94820564(80)	1930	Observationally Stable (Note: Believed to undergo α decay to ^{178}Hf with a half-life over 7.7×10^{21} y)			0+	0.2650(16)	
^{182m}W	2230.65(14) keV			1969	1.3(1) μs	IT	^{182}W	10+		
^{183}W	74	109	182.95022442(80)	1930	Observationally Stable (Note: Believed to undergo α decay to ^{179}Hf with a half-life over 6.70×10^{20} y)			1/2−	0.1431(4)	
^{183m}W	309.492(4) keV			1961	5.30(8) s	IT	^{183}W	11/2+		
^{184}W	74	110	183.95093318(79)	1930	Observationally Stable (Note: Believed to undergo α decay to ^{180}Hf with a half-life over 8.9×10^{21} y)			0+	0.3064(2)	
^{184m1}W	1284.997(8) keV			1966	8.33(18) μs	IT	^{184}W	5−		
^{184m2}W	4127.7(5) keV			2004	188(38) ns	IT	^{184}W	(14+)		
^{185}W	74	111	184.95342121(79)	1940	75.1(3) d	β^{−}	^{185}Re	3/2−		
^{185m}W	197.383(23) keV			1950	1.597(4) min	IT	^{185}W	11/2+		
^{186}W	74	112	185.9543651(13)	1930	Observationally Stable (Note: Believed to undergo α decay to ^{182}Hf with a half-life over 8.2×10^{21} y, or β^{−}β^{−} decay to ^{186}Os with a half-life over 4.1×10^{18} y)			0+	0.2843(19)	
^{186m1}W	1517.2(6) keV			1998	18(1) μs	IT	^{186}W	7−		
^{186m2}W	3542.8(21) keV			1998	2.0(2) s	IT	^{186}W	16+		
^{187}W	74	113	186.9571612(13)	1940	23.809(25) h	β^{−}	^{187}Re	3/2−		
^{187m}W	410.06(4) keV			2005	1.54(13) μs	IT	^{187}W	11/2+		
^{188}W	74	114	187.9584883(33)	1951	69.77(5) d	β^{−}	^{188}Re	0+		
^{188m}W	1926.7(8) keV			2010	109.5(35) ns	IT	^{188}W	8−		
^{189}W	74	115	188.96156(22)#	1963	11.6(2) min	β^{−}	^{189}Re	9/2−#		
^{190}W	74	116	189.963104(38)	1976	30.0(15) min	β^{−}	^{190}Re	0+		
^{190m1}W	1743.6(10) keV			2010	111(17) ns	IT	^{190}W	8+		
^{190m2}W	1840.6(14) keV			2000	166(6) μs	IT	^{190}W	10−		
^{191}W	74	117	190.966531(45)	1999	14# s [>300 ns]			3/2−#		
^{191m}W	235(10)# keV			2009	340(14) ns	IT	^{191}W	9/2−#		
^{192}W	74	118	191.96820(22)#	1999	40# s [>300 ns]			0+		
^{193}W	74	119	192.97188(22)#	2009	30# s [>300 ns]			1/2−#		
^{194}W	74	120	193.97380(32)#	2009	20# s [>300 ns]			0+		
^{195}W	74	121	194.97774(32)#	2012	30# s [>160 ns]			3/2−#		
^{196}W	74	122	195.97988(43)#	2012	25# s [>300 ns]			0+		
^{197}W	74	123	196.98404(43)#	2012	1# s [>300 ns]			5/2−#		
^{198}W	74	124		2026						
^{199}W	74	125		2026						
This table header & footer:

== See also ==
Daughter products other than tungsten

- Isotopes of rhenium
- Isotopes of tantalum
- Isotopes of hafnium
