= Rhenium–osmium dating =

Radiometric dating method using rhenium-187 and osmium-187

Rhenium–osmium dating is a form of radiometric dating based on the beta decay of the isotope ^{187}Re to ^{187}Os. This normally occurs with a half-life of 41.6 × 10^{9} y, but studies using fully ionised ^{187}Re atoms have found that this can decrease to only 33 y. Both rhenium and osmium are strongly siderophilic (iron loving), while Re is also chalcophilic (sulfur loving) making it useful in dating sulfide ores such as gold and Cu–Ni deposits.

This dating method is based on an isochron calculated based on isotopic ratios measured using N-TIMS (Negative – Thermal Ionization Mass Spectrometry).

== Rhenium–osmium isochron ==
Rhenium–osmium dating is carried out by the isochron dating method. Isochrons are created by analysing several samples believed to have formed at the same time from a common source. The Re–Os isochron plots the ratio of radiogenic ^{187}Os to non-radiogenic ^{188}Os against the ratio of the parent isotope ^{187}Re to the non-radiogenic isotope ^{188}Os. The stable and relatively abundant osmium isotope ^{188}Os is used to normalize the radiogenic isotope in the isochron.

The Re–Os isochron is defined by the following equation:

$$\left(\frac{{}^{187}\mathrm{Os}}{{}^{188}\mathrm{Os}}\right)_{\mathrm{present}} = \left(\frac{{}^{187}\mathrm{Os}}{{}^{188}\mathrm{Os}}\right)_{\mathrm{initial}} + \left(\frac{{}^{187}\mathrm{Re}}{{}^{188}\mathrm{Os}}\right) \cdot (e^{\lambda t}-1),$$

where:

t is the age of the sample,
λ is the decay constant of ^{187}Re,
(e^{λt}−1) is the slope of the isochron which defines the age of the system.

A good example of an application of the Re–Os isochron method is a study on the dating of a gold deposit in the Witwatersrand mining camp, South Africa.

== Rhenium–osmium isotopic evolution ==
Rhenium and osmium were strongly refractory and siderophile during the initial accretion of the Earth which caused both elements to preferentially enter the Earth's core. Thus the two elements should be depleted in the silicate Earth yet the ^{187}Os / ^{188}Os ratio of mantle is chondritic. The reason for this apparent contradiction is owed to the change in behavior between Re and Os in partial melt events. Re tends to enter the melt phase (incompatible) while Os remains in the solid residue (compatible). This causes high ratios of Re/Os in oceanic crust (which is derived from partial melting of mantle) and low ratios of Re/Os in the lower mantle. In this regard, the Re–Os system to study the geochemical evolution of mantle rocks and in defining the chronology of mantle differentiation is extremely helpful.

Peridotite xenoliths which are thought to sample the upper mantle sometimes contain supra-chondritic Os-isotopic ratios. This is thought to evidence of subducted ancient high Re/Os basaltic crust that is being recycled back into the mantle. This combination of radiogenic (^{187}Os that was created by decay of ^{187}Re) and nonradiogenic melts helps to support the theory of at least two Os-isotopic reservoirs in the mantle. The volume of both these reservoirs is thought to be around 5–10% of the whole mantle. The first reservoir is characterized by depletion in Re and proxies for melt fertility (such as concentrations of elements like Ca and Al). The second reservoir is chondritic in composition.

Direct measurement of the age of continental crust through Re–Os dating is difficult. Infiltration of xenoliths by their commonly Re-rich magma alters the true elemental Re/Os ratios. Instead, determining model ages can be done in two ways: "Re depletion" model ages or the "melting age" model. The former finds the minimum age of the extraction event assuming the elemental Re/Os ratio equals 0 (komatiite residues have Re/Os of 0, so this is assuming a xenolith was extracted from a near-komatiite melt). The latter gives the age of the melting event inferred from the point when a melt proxy like Al_{2}O_{3} is equal to 0 (ancient subcontinental lithosphere has weight percentages of CaO and Al_{2}O_{3} ranging from 0 to 2%).

== Pt–Re–Os systematics ==
The radioactive decay of ^{190}Pt to ^{186}Os has a half-life of 4.83(3)×10^{11} years (which is longer than the age of the universe, so it is essentially stable). However, in-situ ^{187}Os / ^{188}Os and ^{186}Os / ^{188}Os of modern plume related magmas show simultaneous enrichment which implies a source that is supra-chondritic in Pt/Os and Re/Os. Since both parental isotopes have extremely long half-lives, the Os-isotope rich reservoir must be very old to allow enough time for the daughter isotopes to form. These observations are interpreted to support the theory that the Archean subducted crust contributed Os-isotope rich melts back into the mantle.
