= Isotopes of roentgenium =

Isotopes of roentgenium (_{111}Rg)
Main isotopes			Decay	
Isotope	abundance	half-life (t_{1/2})	mode	product
^{279}Rg	synth	0.09 s	α87%	^{275}Mt
^{279}Rg	synth	0.09 s	SF13%	–
^{280}Rg	synth	3.9 s	α	^{276}Mt
^{281}Rg	synth	11 s	SF86%	–
^{281}Rg	synth	11 s	α14%	^{277}Mt
^{282}Rg	synth	100 s	α	^{278}Mt
^{283}Rg	synth	5.1 min?	SF	–
^{286}Rg	synth	10.7 min?	α	^{282}Mt

Roentgenium (_{111}Rg) is a synthetic element, and thus a standard atomic weight cannot be given. Like all synthetic elements, it has no stable isotopes. The first isotope to be synthesized was ^{272}Rg in 1994, which is also the only directly synthesized isotope; all others are decay products of heavier elements. There are seven known radioisotopes, having mass numbers of 272, 274, and 278–282. The longest-lived isotope is ^{282}Rg with a half-life of about 2 minutes, although the unconfirmed ^{283}Rg and ^{286}Rg may have longer half-lives of about 5.1 minutes and 10.7 minutes respectively.

== List of isotopes ==
Nuclide	Z	N	Isotopic mass (Da) (Note: ( ) – Uncertainty (1σ) is given in concise form in parentheses after the corresponding last digits.) (Note: # – Atomic mass marked #: value and uncertainty derived not from purely experimental data, but at least partly from trends from the Mass Surface (TMS).)	Discovery year	Half-life	Decay mode (Note: Modes of decay: EC: / Electron capture; SF: / Spontaneous fission)	Daughter isotope	Spin and parity (Note: # – Values marked # are not purely derived from experimental data, but at least partly from trends of neighboring nuclides (TNN).)
^{272}Rg	111	161	272.15327(25)#	1995	3.8+1.4 −0.8 ms [4.2(11) ms]	α	^{268}Mt	5+#, 6+#
^{274}Rg (Note: Not directly synthesized, occurs as a decay product of ^{278}Nh)	111	163	274.15525(23)#	2004	12+17 −5 ms [20(11) ms]	α	^{270}Mt	
^{278}Rg (Note: Not directly synthesized, occurs as a decay product of ^{282}Nh)	111	167	278.16159(42)#	2007	4.6+5.5 −1.6 ms	α	^{274}Mt	
^{279}Rg (Note: Not directly synthesized, occurs in decay chain of ^{287}Mc)	111	168	279.16288(45)#	2004	90+60 −25 ms	α (87%)	^{275}Mt	
^{279}Rg	111	168	279.16288(45)#	2004	90+60 −25 ms	SF (13%)	(various)	
^{280}Rg (Note: Not directly synthesized, occurs in decay chain of ^{288}Mc)	111	169	280.16520(57)#	2004	3.9(3) s	α (87%)	^{276}Mt	
^{280}Rg	111	169	280.16520(57)#	2004	3.9(3) s	EC (13%)	^{280}Ds	
^{281}Rg (Note: Not directly synthesized, occurs in decay chain of ^{293}Ts)	111	170	281.16676(83)#	2010	11+3 −1 s	SF (86%)	(various)	
^{281}Rg	111	170	281.16676(83)#	2010	11+3 −1 s	α (14%)	^{277}Mt	
^{282}Rg (Note: Not directly synthesized, occurs in decay chain of ^{294}Ts)	111	171	282.16934(63)#	2010	100+70 −30 s [130(50) s]	α	^{278}Mt	
^{283}Rg (Note: Not directly synthesized, occurs in decay chain of ^{287}Fl; unconfirmed)	111	172	283.17110(73)#	(2017)	5.1 min?	SF	(various)	
^{286}Rg (Note: Not directly synthesised, occurs in decay chain of ^{290}Fl and ^{294}Lv; unconfirmed)	111	175	286.17876(49)#	(2016)	10.7 min?	α	^{282}Mt	
This table header & footer:

== Isotopes and nuclear properties ==
=== Nucleosynthesis ===
Super-heavy elements such as roentgenium are produced by bombarding lighter elements in particle accelerators that induce fusion reactions. Whereas the lightest isotope of roentgenium, roentgenium-272, can be synthesized directly this way, all the heavier roentgenium isotopes have only been observed as decay products of elements with higher atomic numbers.

Depending on the energies involved, fusion reactions can be categorized as "hot" or "cold". In hot fusion reactions, very light, high-energy projectiles are accelerated toward very heavy targets (actinides), giving rise to compound nuclei at high excitation energy (~40–50 MeV) that may either fission or evaporate several (3 to 5) neutrons. In cold fusion reactions, the produced fused nuclei have a relatively low excitation energy (~10–20 MeV), which decreases the probability that these products will undergo fission reactions. As the fused nuclei cool to the ground state, they require emission of only one or two neutrons, and thus, allows for the generation of more neutron-rich products. The latter is a distinct concept from that of where nuclear fusion claimed to be achieved at room temperature conditions (see cold fusion).

The table below contains various combinations of targets and projectiles which could be used to form compound nuclei with Z=111.

Target	Projectile	CN	Attempt result
^{205}Tl	^{70}Zn	^{275}Rg	Failure to date
^{208}Pb	^{65}Cu	^{273}Rg	Successful reaction
^{209}Bi	^{64}Ni	^{273}Rg	Successful reaction
^{231}Pa	^{48}Ca	^{279}Rg	Reaction yet to be attempted
^{238}U	^{41}K	^{279}Rg	Reaction yet to be attempted
^{244}Pu	^{37}Cl	^{281}Rg	Reaction yet to be attempted
^{248}Cm	^{31}P	^{279}Rg	Reaction yet to be attempted
^{250}Cm	^{31}P	^{281}Rg	Reaction yet to be attempted

==== Cold fusion ====
Before the first successful synthesis of roentgenium in 1994 by the GSI team, a team at the Joint Institute for Nuclear Research in Dubna, Russia, also tried to synthesize roentgenium by bombarding bismuth-209 with nickel-64 in 1986. No roentgenium atoms were identified. After an upgrade of their facilities, the team at GSI successfully detected 3 atoms of ^{272}Rg in their discovery experiment. A further 3 atoms were synthesized in 2002. The discovery of roentgenium was confirmed in 2003 when a team at RIKEN measured the decays of 14 atoms of ^{272}Rg.

The same roentgenium isotope was also observed by an American team at the Lawrence Berkeley National Laboratory (LBNL) from the reaction:

^{208}_{82}Pb + ^{65}_{29}Cu → ^{272}_{111}Rg + n

This reaction was conducted as part of their study of projectiles with odd atomic number in cold fusion reactions.

The ^{205}Tl(^{70}Zn,n)^{274}Rg reaction was tried by the RIKEN team in 2004 and repeated in 2010 in an attempt to secure the discovery of its parent ^{278}Nh:

^{205}_{81}Tl + ^{70}_{30}Zn → ^{274}_{111}Rg + n

Due to the weakness of the thallium target, they were unable to detect any atoms of ^{274}Rg.

==== As decay product ====
List of roentgenium isotopes observed by decay
Evaporation residue	Observed roentgenium isotope
^{294}Lv, ^{290}Fl, ^{290}Nh ?	^{286}Rg ?
^{287}Fl, ^{287}Nh ?	^{283}Rg ?
^{294}Ts, ^{290}Mc, ^{286}Nh	^{282}Rg
^{293}Ts, ^{289}Mc, ^{285}Nh	^{281}Rg
^{288}Mc, ^{284}Nh	^{280}Rg
^{287}Mc, ^{283}Nh	^{279}Rg
^{286}Mc, ^{282}Nh	^{278}Rg
^{278}Nh	^{274}Rg

All the isotopes of roentgenium except roentgenium-272 have been detected only in the decay chains of elements with a higher atomic number, such as nihonium. Nihonium currently has six known isotopes, with two more unconfirmed; all of them undergo alpha decays to become roentgenium nuclei, with mass numbers between 274 and 286. Parent nihonium nuclei can be themselves decay products of moscovium and tennessine, and (via unconfirmed branches) flerovium and livermorium. For example, in January 2010, the Dubna team (JINR) identified roentgenium-281 as a final product in the decay of tennessine via an alpha decay sequence:

^{293}_{117}Ts → ^{289}_{115}Mc + ^{4}_{2}He
^{289}_{115}Mc → ^{285}_{113}Nh + ^{4}_{2}He
^{285}_{113}Nh → ^{281}_{111}Rg + ^{4}_{2}He

=== Nuclear isomerism ===
^{274}Rg

Two atoms of ^{274}Rg have been observed in the decay chain of ^{278}Nh. They decay by alpha emission, emitting alpha particles with different energies, and have different lifetimes. In addition, the two entire decay chains appear to be different. This suggests the presence of two nuclear isomers but further research is required.

^{272}Rg

Four alpha particles emitted from ^{272}Rg with energies of 11.37, 11.03, 10.82, and 10.40 MeV have been detected. The GSI measured ^{272}Rg to have a half-life of 1.6 ms while recent data from RIKEN have given a half-life of 3.8 ms. The conflicting data may be due to nuclear isomers but the current data are insufficient to come to any firm assignments.

=== Chemical yields of isotopes ===
==== Cold fusion ====
The table below provides cross-sections and excitation energies for cold fusion reactions producing roentgenium isotopes directly. Data in bold represent maxima derived from excitation function measurements. + represents an observed exit channel.

Projectile	Target	CN	1n	2n	3n
^{64}Ni	^{209}Bi	^{273}Rg	3.5 pb, 12.5 MeV		
^{65}Cu	^{208}Pb	^{273}Rg	1.7 pb, 13.2 MeV		

=== Theoretical calculations ===
==== Evaporation residue cross sections ====
The below table contains various targets-projectile combinations for which calculations have provided estimates for cross section yields from various neutron evaporation channels. The channel with the highest expected yield is given.

DNS = Di-nuclear system; σ = cross section

Target	Projectile	CN	Channel (product)	σ_{max}	Model	Ref
^{238}U	^{41}K	^{279}Rg	4n (^{275}Rg)	0.21 pb	DNS	
^{244}Pu	^{37}Cl	^{281}Rg	4n (^{277}Rg)	0.33 pb	DNS	
^{248}Cm	^{31}P	^{279}Rg	4n (^{275}Rg)	1.85 pb	DNS	
^{250}Cm	^{31}P	^{281}Rg	4n (^{277}Rg)	0.41 pb	DNS	
