= Period 7 element =

Any element in row 7 of the periodic table

A period 7 element is one of the chemical elements in the seventh row (or period) of the periodic table of the chemical elements. The periodic table is laid out in rows to illustrate recurring (periodic) trends in the chemical behavior of the elements as their atomic number increases: a new row is begun when chemical behavior begins to repeat, meaning that elements with similar behavior fall into the same vertical columns. The seventh period contains 32 elements, tied for the most with period 6, beginning with francium and ending with oganesson, the heaviest element currently discovered. As a rule, period 7 elements fill their 7s shells first, then their 5f, 6d, and 7p shells in that order, but there are exceptions, such as uranium.

== Properties ==
All period 7 elements are radioactive. This period contains the actinides, which include plutonium, the last naturally occurring element; (Note: Trace quantities of ^{239}Pu are found in uranium deposits due to neutron capture of ^{238}U and subsequent beta decay. It is also possible that the long-lived isotope ^{244}Pu may exist primordially.) subsequent elements must be created artificially. While the first five of these synthetic elements (americium through einsteinium) are now available in macroscopic quantities, most are extremely rare, having only been prepared in microgram amounts or less. The later transactinide elements have only been identified in laboratories in batches of a few atoms at a time.

Though the rarity of many of these elements means that experimental results are not many, their periodic and group trends are less well defined than other periods. Whilst francium and radium do show typical properties of their respective groups, actinides display a much greater variety of behavior and oxidation states than the lanthanides. These peculiarities are due to a variety of factors, including a large degree of spin–orbit coupling and relativistic effects, ultimately caused by the very high electric charge of their massive nuclei. Periodicity mostly holds throughout the 6d series and is predicted also for moscovium and livermorium, but the other four 7p elements, nihonium, flerovium, tennessine, and oganesson, are predicted to have very different properties from those expected for their groups.

== Elements ==
Chemical element			Block	Electron configuration	Occurrence
87	Fr	Francium	s-block	[Rn] 7s^{1}	From decay
88	Ra	Radium	s-block	[Rn] 7s^{2}	From decay
89	Ac	Actinium	f-block	[Rn] 6d^{1} 7s^{2} (*)	From decay
90	Th	Thorium	f-block	[Rn] 6d^{2} 7s^{2} (*)	Primordial
91	Pa	Protactinium	f-block	[Rn] 5f^{2} 6d^{1} 7s^{2} (*)	From decay
92	U	Uranium	f-block	[Rn] 5f^{3} 6d^{1} 7s^{2} (*)	Primordial
93	Np	Neptunium	f-block	[Rn] 5f^{4} 6d^{1} 7s^{2} (*)	From decay
94	Pu	Plutonium	f-block	[Rn] 5f^{6} 7s^{2}	From decay
95	Am	Americium	f-block	[Rn] 5f^{7} 7s^{2}	Synthetic
96	Cm	Curium	f-block	[Rn] 5f^{7} 6d^{1} 7s^{2} (*)	Synthetic
97	Bk	Berkelium	f-block	[Rn] 5f^{9} 7s^{2}	Synthetic
98	Cf	Californium	f-block	[Rn] 5f^{10} 7s^{2}	Synthetic
99	Es	Einsteinium	f-block	[Rn] 5f^{11} 7s^{2}	Synthetic
100	Fm	Fermium	f-block	[Rn] 5f^{12} 7s^{2}	Synthetic
101	Md	Mendelevium	f-block	[Rn] 5f^{13} 7s^{2}	Synthetic
102	No	Nobelium	f-block	[Rn] 5f^{14} 7s^{2}	Synthetic
103	Lr	Lawrencium	d-block	[Rn] 5f^{14} 7s^{2} 7p^{1} (*)	Synthetic
104	Rf	Rutherfordium	d-block	[Rn] 5f^{14} 6d^{2} 7s^{2}	Synthetic
105	Db	Dubnium	d-block	[Rn] 5f^{14} 6d^{3} 7s^{2}	Synthetic
106	Sg	Seaborgium	d-block	[Rn] 5f^{14} 6d^{4} 7s^{2}	Synthetic
107	Bh	Bohrium	d-block	[Rn] 5f^{14} 6d^{5} 7s^{2}	Synthetic
108	Hs	Hassium	d-block	[Rn] 5f^{14} 6d^{6} 7s^{2}	Synthetic
109	Mt	Meitnerium	d-block	[Rn] 5f^{14} 6d^{7} 7s^{2} (?)	Synthetic
110	Ds	Darmstadtium	d-block	[Rn] 5f^{14} 6d^{8} 7s^{2} (?)	Synthetic
111	Rg	Roentgenium	d-block	[Rn] 5f^{14} 6d^{9} 7s^{2} (?)	Synthetic
112	Cn	Copernicium	d-block	[Rn] 5f^{14} 6d^{10} 7s^{2} (?)	Synthetic
113	Nh	Nihonium	p-block	[Rn] 5f^{14} 6d^{10} 7s^{2} 7p^{1} (?)	Synthetic
114	Fl	Flerovium	p-block	[Rn] 5f^{14} 6d^{10} 7s^{2} 7p^{2} (?)	Synthetic
115	Mc	Moscovium	p-block	[Rn] 5f^{14} 6d^{10} 7s^{2} 7p^{3} (?)	Synthetic
116	Lv	Livermorium	p-block	[Rn] 5f^{14} 6d^{10} 7s^{2} 7p^{4} (?)	Synthetic
117	Ts	Tennessine	p-block	[Rn] 5f^{14} 6d^{10} 7s^{2} 7p^{5} (?)	Synthetic
118	Og	Oganesson	p-block	[Rn] 5f^{14} 6d^{10} 7s^{2} 7p^{6} (?)	Synthetic

(?) Prediction

(*) Exception to the Madelung rule.

In many periodic tables, the f-block is erroneously shifted one element to the right, so that lanthanum and actinium become d-block elements, and Ce–Lu and Th–Lr form the f-block tearing the d-block into two very uneven portions. This is a holdover from early erroneous measurements of electron configurations. Lev Landau and Evgeny Lifshitz pointed out in 1948 that lutetium is not an f-block element, and since then physical, chemical, and electronic evidence has overwhelmingly supported that the f-block contains the elements La–Yb and Ac–No, as shown here and as supported by International Union of Pure and Applied Chemistry reports dating from 1988 and 2021.

=== S-block ===
Francium and radium make up the s-block elements of the 7th period.

Francium (Fr, atomic number 87) is a highly radioactive metal that decays into astatine, radium, or radon. It is one of the two least electronegative elements; the other is caesium. As an alkali metal, it has one valence electron. Francium was discovered by Marguerite Perey in France (from which the element takes its name) in 1939. It was the last element discovered in nature, rather than by synthesis. (Note: Some elements discovered through synthesis, such as technetium, have later been found in nature.) Outside the laboratory, francium is extremely rare, with trace amounts found in uranium and thorium ores, where the isotope francium-223 continually forms and decays. As little as 20–30 g (one ounce) exists at any given time throughout Earth's crust; the other isotopes are entirely synthetic. The largest amount produced in the laboratory was a cluster of more than 300,000 atoms.

Radium (Ra, atomic number 88) is an almost pure-white alkaline earth metal, but it readily oxidizes, reacting with nitrogen (rather than oxygen) on exposure to air, becoming black in color. All isotopes of radium are radioactive; the most stable is radium-226, which has a half-life of 1601 years and decays into radon. Due to such instability, radium luminesces, glowing a faint blue. Radium, in the form of radium chloride, was discovered by Marie and Pierre Curie in 1898. They extracted the radium compound from uraninite and published the discovery at the French Academy of Sciences five days later. Radium was isolated in its metallic state by Marie Curie and André-Louis Debierne through electrolysis of radium chloride in 1910. Since its discovery, it has given names such as radium A and radium C_{2} to several isotopes of other elements that are decay products of radium-226. In nature, radium is found in uranium ores in trace amounts as small as a seventh of a gram per ton of uraninite. Radium is not necessary for living things, and adverse health effects are likely when it is incorporated into biochemical processes due to its radioactivity and chemical reactivity.

=== Actinides ===
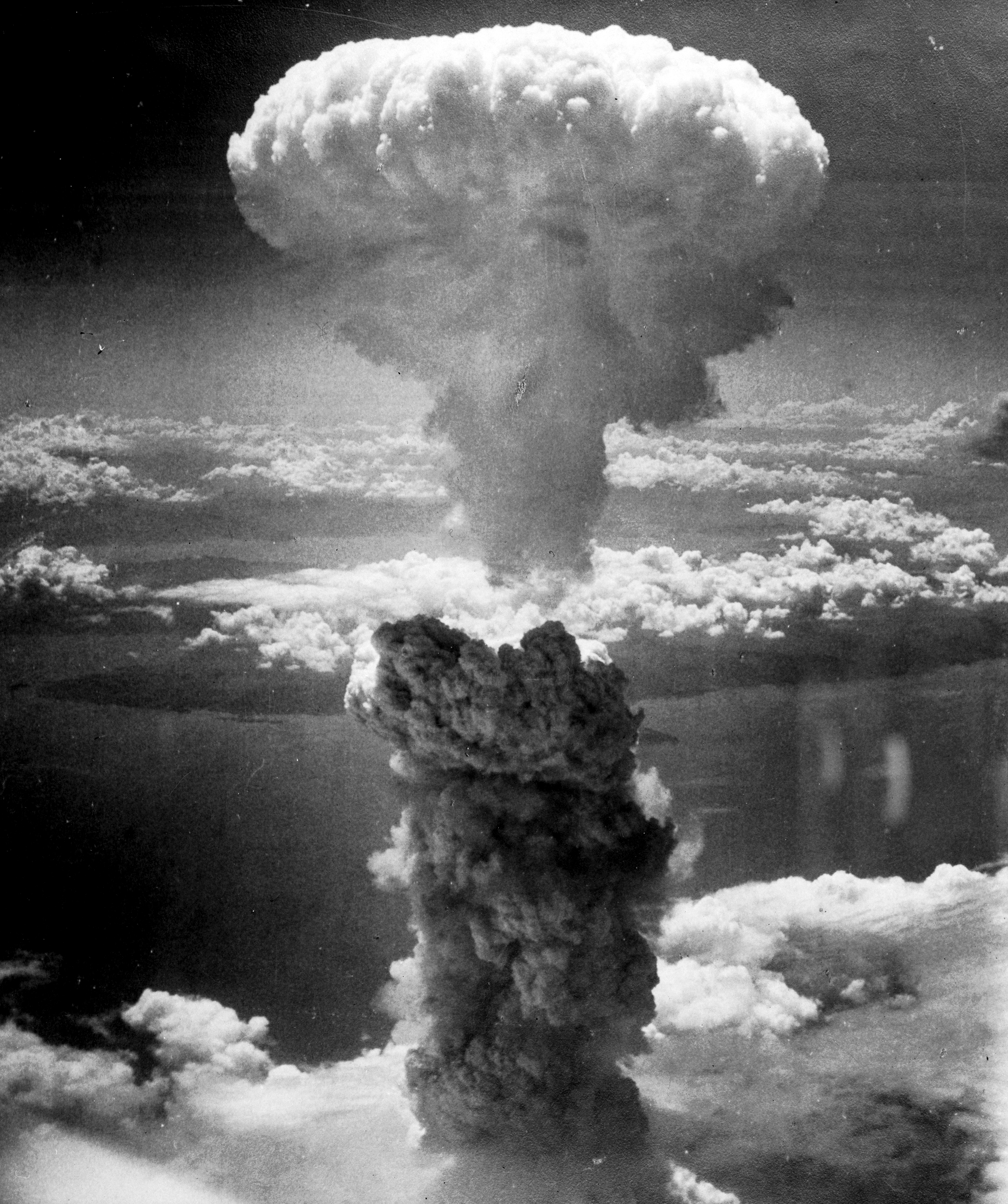
The atomic bomb dropped on Nagasaki had a plutonium charge.

The actinide or actinoid (IUPAC nomenclature) series encompasses the 15 metallic chemical elements with atomic numbers from 89 to 103, actinium through lawrencium.

The actinide series is named after its first element actinium. All but one of the actinides are f-block elements, corresponding to the filling of the 5f electron shell; lawrencium, a d-block element, is also generally considered an actinide. In comparison with the lanthanides, also mostly f-block elements, the actinides show much more variable valence.

Of the actinides, thorium and uranium occur naturally in substantial, primordial, quantities. Radioactive decay of uranium produces transient amounts of actinium, protactinium and plutonium, and atoms of neptunium and plutonium are occasionally produced from transmutation in uranium ores. The other actinides are purely synthetic elements, though the first six actinides after plutonium would have been produced at Oklo (and long since decayed away), and curium almost certainly previously existed in nature as an extinct radionuclide. Nuclear tests have released at least six actinides heavier than plutonium into the environment; analysis of debris from a 1952 hydrogen bomb explosion showed the presence of americium, curium, berkelium, californium, einsteinium and fermium.

All actinides are radioactive and release energy upon radioactive decay; naturally occurring uranium and thorium, and synthetically produced plutonium are the most abundant actinides on Earth. These are used in nuclear reactors and nuclear weapons. Uranium and thorium also have diverse current or historical uses, and americium is used in the ionization chambers of most modern smoke detectors.

In presentations of the periodic table, the lanthanides and the actinides are customarily shown as two additional rows below the main body of the table, with placeholders or else a selected single element of each series (either lanthanum or lutetium, and either actinium or lawrencium, respectively) shown in a single cell of the main table, between barium and hafnium, and radium and rutherfordium, respectively. This convention is entirely a matter of aesthetics and formatting practicality; a rarely used wide-formatted periodic table (32 columns) shows the lanthanide and actinide series in their proper columns, as parts of the table's sixth and seventh rows (periods).

=== Transactinides ===
Transactinide elements (also, transactinides, or super-heavy elements, or superheavies) are the chemical elements with atomic numbers greater than those of the actinides, the heaviest of which is lawrencium (103). All transactinides of period 7 have been discovered, up to oganesson (element 118).

Superheavies are also transuranic elements, that is, have atomic number greater than that of uranium (92). The further distinction of having an atomic number greater than the actinides is significant in several ways:

- The transactinide elements all have electrons in the 6d subshell in their ground state (and thus are placed in the d-block).
- Even the longest-lived known isotopes of many transactinides have extremely short half-lives, measured in seconds or smaller units.
- The element naming controversy involved the first five or six transactinides. These elements thus used three-letter systematic names for many years after their discovery was confirmed. (Usually, the three-letter symbols are replaced with two-letter symbols relatively soon after a discovery has been confirmed.)

Transactinides are radioactive and have only been obtained synthetically in laboratories. None of these elements has ever been collected in a macroscopic sample. Transactinides are all named after scientists, or important locations involved in the synthesis of the elements.

Chemistry Nobel Prize winner Glenn T. Seaborg, who first proposed the actinide concept which led to the acceptance of the actinide series, also proposed the existence of a transactinide series ranging from element 104 to 121 and a superactinide series approximately spanning elements 122 to 153. The transactinide seaborgium is named in his honor.

IUPAC defines an element to exist if its lifetime is longer than 10^{−14} second, the time needed to form an electron cloud.
