= Isotopes of meitnerium =

Isotopes of meitnerium (_{109}Mt)
Main isotopes			Decay	
Isotope	abundance	half-life (t_{1/2})	mode	product
^{274}Mt	synth	0.64 s	α	^{270}Bh
^{276}Mt	synth	0.62 s	α	^{272}Bh
^{278}Mt	synth	4.5 s	α	^{274}Bh
^{282}Mt	synth	67 s?	α	^{278}Bh

Meitnerium (_{109}Mt) is a synthetic element, and thus a standard atomic weight cannot be given. Like all synthetic elements, it has no stable isotopes. The first isotope to be synthesized was ^{266}Mt in 1982, and this is also the only isotope directly synthesized; all other isotopes are only known as decay products of heavier elements. There are eight known isotopes, from ^{266}Mt to ^{278}Mt. There may also be three isomers. The longest-lived of the known isotopes is ^{278}Mt with a half-life of 4.5 seconds. The unconfirmed heavier ^{282}Mt appears to have an even longer half-life of 67 seconds.

== List of isotopes ==
Nuclide (Note: ^{m}Mt – Excited nuclear isomer.)	Z	N	Isotopic mass (Da) (Note: ( ) – Uncertainty (1σ) is given in concise form in parentheses after the corresponding last digits.) (Note: # – Atomic mass marked #: value and uncertainty derived not from purely experimental data, but at least partly from trends from the Mass Surface (TMS).)	Discovery year	Half-life	Decay mode	Daughter isotope	Spin and parity (Note: ( ) spin value – Indicates spin with weak assignment arguments.) (Note: # – Values marked # are not purely derived from experimental data, but at least partly from trends of neighboring nuclides (TNN).)
Nuclide	Excitation energy			Discovery year	Half-life	Decay mode	Daughter isotope	Spin and parity
^{266}Mt	109	157	266.137060(100)	1982	2.0(5) ms	α	^{262}Bh	
^{266m}Mt	1140(90) keV			1997	3.4+4.7 −1.3 ms [6(3) ms]	α	^{262}Bh	
^{268}Mt (Note: Not directly synthesized, occurs as decay product of ^{272}Rg)	109	159	268.13865(25)#	1995	21+8 −5 ms [23(7) ms]	α	^{264}Bh	5+#, 6+#
^{268m}Mt (Note: Discovery of this isomer is unconfirmed)	0+X keV			---- (Note: No information, not included in discovery database)	70+100 −30 ms	α	^{264}Bh	
^{270}Mt (Note: Not directly synthesized, occurs in decay chain of ^{278}Nh)	109	161	270.14032(21)#	2004	0.48+0.66 −0.18 s [0.8(4) s]	α	^{266}Bh	
^{270m}Mt				----	1.1 s?	α	^{266}Bh	
^{274}Mt (Note: Not directly synthesized, occurs in decay chain of ^{282}Nh)	109	165	274.14734(40)#	2007	640+760 −230 ms	α	^{270}Bh	
^{275}Mt (Note: Not directly synthesized, occurs in decay chain of ^{287}Mc)	109	166	275.14897(42)#	2004	20+13 −6 ms	α	^{271}Bh	
^{276}Mt (Note: Not directly synthesized, occurs in decay chain of ^{288}Mc)	109	167	276.15171(57)#	2004	620+60 −40 ms	α	^{272}Bh	
^{276m}Mt	250(80) keV			2012	4+5 −1 s [7(3) s]	α	^{272}Bh	
^{277}Mt (Note: Not directly synthesized, occurs in decay chain of ^{293}Ts)	109	168	277.15353(71)#	2013	5+9 −2 ms	SF	(various)	
^{278}Mt (Note: Not directly synthesized, occurs in decay chain of ^{294}Ts)	109	169	278.15649(62)#	2010	4.5+3.5 −1.3 s [6(3) s]	α	^{274}Bh	
^{282}Mt (Note: Not directly synthesized, occurs in decay chain of ^{290}Fl and ^{294}Lv; unconfirmed)	109	173	282.16689(48)#	(2016)	67 s?	α	^{278}Bh	
This table header & footer:

== Isotopes and nuclear properties ==
=== Nucleosynthesis ===
Super-heavy elements such as meitnerium are produced by bombarding lighter elements in particle accelerators that induce fusion reactions. Whereas the lightest isotope of meitnerium, meitnerium-266, can be synthesized directly this way, all the heavier meitnerium isotopes have only been observed as decay products of elements with higher atomic numbers.

Depending on the energies involved, the former are separated into "hot" and "cold". In hot fusion reactions, very light, high-energy projectiles are accelerated toward very heavy targets (actinides), giving rise to compound nuclei at high excitation energy (~40–50 MeV) that may either fission or evaporate several (3 to 5) neutrons. In cold fusion reactions, the produced fused nuclei have a relatively low excitation energy (~10–20 MeV), which decreases the probability that these products will undergo fission reactions. As the fused nuclei cool to the ground state, they require emission of only one or two neutrons, and thus, allows for the generation of more neutron-rich products. Nevertheless, the products of hot fusion tend to still have more neutrons overall. The latter is a distinct concept from that of where nuclear fusion claimed to be achieved at room temperature conditions (see cold fusion).

The table below contains various combinations of targets and projectiles which could be used to form compound nuclei with Z = 109.

Target	Projectile	CN	Attempt result
^{208}Pb	^{59}Co	^{267}Mt	Successful reaction
^{209}Bi	^{58}Fe	^{267}Mt	Successful reaction
^{238}U	^{37}Cl	^{275}Mt	Failure to date
^{244}Pu	^{31}P	^{275}Mt	Reaction yet to be attempted
^{248}Cm	^{27}Al	^{275}Mt	Reaction yet to be attempted
^{250}Cm	^{27}Al	^{277}Mt	Reaction yet to be attempted
^{249}Bk	^{26}Mg	^{275}Mt	Reaction yet to be attempted
^{254}Es	^{22}Ne	^{276}Mt	Failure to date

==== Cold fusion ====
After the first successful synthesis of meitnerium in 1982 by the GSI team, a team at the Joint Institute for Nuclear Research in Dubna, Russia, also tried to observe the new element by bombarding bismuth-209 with iron-58. In 1985 they managed to identity alpha decays from the descendant isotope ^{246}Cf indicating the formation of meitnerium. The observation of a further two atoms of ^{266}Mt from the same reaction was reported in 1988 and of another 12 in 1997 by the German team at GSI.

The same meitnerium isotope was also observed by the Russian team at Dubna in 1985 from the reaction:

^{208}_{82}Pb + ^{59}_{27}Co → ^{266}_{109}Mt + n

by detecting the alpha decay of the descendant ^{246}Cf nuclei. In 2007, an American team at the Lawrence Berkeley National Laboratory (LBNL) confirmed the decay chain of the ^{266}Mt isotope from this reaction.

==== Hot fusion ====
In 2002–2003, the team at LBNL attempted to generate the isotope ^{271}Mt to study its chemical properties by bombarding uranium-238 with chlorine-37, but without success. Another possible reaction that would form this isotope would be the fusion of berkelium-249 with magnesium-26; however, the yield for this reaction is expected to be very low due to the high radioactivity of the berkelium-249 target. Other potentially longer-lived isotopes were unsuccessfully targeted by a team at Lawrence Livermore National Laboratory (LLNL) in 1988 by bombarding einsteinium-254 with neon-22.

==== Decay products ====
List of meitnerium isotopes observed by decay
Evaporation residue	Observed meitnerium isotope
^{294}Lv, ^{290}Fl, ^{290}Nh, ^{286}Rg ?	^{282}Mt ?
^{294}Ts, ^{290}Mc, ^{286}Nh, ^{282}Rg	^{278}Mt
^{293}Ts, ^{289}Mc, ^{285}Nh, ^{281}Rg	^{277}Mt
^{288}Mc, ^{284}Nh, ^{280}Rg	^{276}Mt
^{287}Mc, ^{283}Nh, ^{279}Rg	^{275}Mt
^{286}Mc, ^{282}Nh, ^{278}Rg	^{274}Mt
^{278}Nh, ^{274}Rg	^{270}Mt
^{272}Rg	^{268}Mt

All the isotopes of meitnerium except meitnerium-266 have been detected only in the decay chains of elements with a higher atomic number, such as roentgenium. Roentgenium currently has eight known isotopes; all but one of them undergo alpha decays to become meitnerium nuclei, with mass numbers between 268 and 282. Parent roentgenium nuclei can be themselves decay products of nihonium, flerovium, moscovium, livermorium, or tennessine. For example, in January 2010, the Dubna team (JINR) identified meitnerium-278 as a product in the decay of tennessine via an alpha decay sequence:

^{294}_{117}Ts → ^{290}_{115}Mc + ^{4}_{2}He
^{290}_{115}Mc → ^{286}_{113}Nh + ^{4}_{2}He
^{286}_{113}Nh → ^{282}_{111}Rg + ^{4}_{2}He
^{282}_{111}Rg → ^{278}_{109}Mt + ^{4}_{2}He

==== Nuclear isomerism ====
^{270}Mt

Two atoms of ^{270}Mt have been identified in the decay chains of ^{278}Nh. The two decays have very different lifetimes and decay energies and are also produced from two apparently different isomers of ^{274}Rg. The first isomer decays by emission of an alpha particle with energy 10.03 MeV and has a lifetime of 7.16 ms. The other alpha decays with a lifetime of 1.63 s; the decay energy was not measured. An assignment to specific levels is not possible with the limited data available and further research is required.

^{268}Mt

The alpha decay spectrum for ^{268}Mt appears to be complicated from the results of several experiments. Alpha particles of energies 10.28, 10.22 and 10.10 MeV have been observed, emitted from ^{268}Mt atoms with half-lives of 42 ms, 21 ms and 102 ms respectively. The long-lived decay must be assigned to an isomeric level. The discrepancy between the other two half-lives has yet to be resolved. An assignment to specific levels is not possible with the data available and further research is required.

^{276}Mt

Three events of ^{276}Mt decay have noticeably longer lifetimes of 13.6 s, 16.9 s, and 8.95 s respectively. These long-lived decays might come from an isomeric level, but might actually come from decay of ^{280}Rg or ^{272}Bh, which have half-lives of 3.2 s and 7.2 s respectively.

=== Chemical yields of isotopes ===
==== Cold fusion ====
The table below provides cross-sections and excitation energies for cold fusion reactions producing meitnerium isotopes directly. Data in bold represent maxima derived from excitation function measurements. + represents an observed exit channel.

Projectile	Target	CN	1n	2n	3n
^{58}Fe	^{209}Bi	^{267}Mt	**7.5 pb**		
^{59}Co	^{208}Pb	^{267}Mt	2.6 pb, 14.9 MeV		

=== Theoretical calculations ===
==== Evaporation residue cross sections ====
The below table contains various targets-projectile combinations for which calculations have provided estimates for cross section yields from various neutron evaporation channels. The channel with the highest expected yield is given.

DNS = Di-nuclear system; HIVAP = heavy-ion vaporisation statistical-evaporation model; σ = cross section

Target	Projectile	CN	Channel (product)	σ_{max}	Model	Ref
^{238}U	^{37}Cl	^{275}Mt	3n (^{272}Mt)	13.31 pb	DNS	
^{244}Pu	^{31}P	^{275}Mt	3n (^{272}Mt)	4.25 pb	DNS	
^{243}Am	^{30}Si	^{273}Mt	3n (^{270}Mt)	22 pb	HIVAP	
^{243}Am	^{28}Si	^{271}Mt	4n (^{267}Mt)	3 pb	HIVAP	
^{248}Cm	^{27}Al	^{275}Mt	3n (^{272}Mt)	27.83 pb	DNS	
^{250}Cm	^{27}Al	^{277}Mt	5n (^{272}Mt)	97.44 pb	DNS	
^{249}Bk	^{26}Mg	^{275}Mt	4n (^{271}Mt)	9.5 pb	HIVAP	
^{254}Es	^{22}Ne	^{276}Mt	4n (^{272}Mt)	8 pb	HIVAP	
^{254}Es	^{20}Ne	^{274}Mt	4-5n (^{270,269}Mt)	3 pb	HIVAP	
