= Mendelevium =

Mendelevium, _{101}Md
Mendelevium
- Pronunciation: /ˌmɛndəˈliːviəm/ (MEN-də-LEE-vee-əm); /ˌmɛndəˈleɪviəm/ (MEN-də-LAY-vee-əm)
- Mass number: [258]

Mendelevium in the periodic table
Hydrogen																															Helium
Lithium	Beryllium																									Boron	Carbon	Nitrogen	Oxygen	Fluorine	Neon
Sodium	Magnesium																									Aluminium	Silicon	Phosphorus	Sulfur	Chlorine	Argon
Potassium	Calcium															Scandium	Titanium	Vanadium	Chromium	Manganese	Iron	Cobalt	Nickel	Copper	Zinc	Gallium	Germanium	Arsenic	Selenium	Bromine	Krypton
Rubidium	Strontium															Yttrium	Zirconium	Niobium	Molybdenum	Technetium	Ruthenium	Rhodium	Palladium	Silver	Cadmium	Indium	Tin	Antimony	Tellurium	Iodine	Xenon
Caesium	Barium	Lanthanum	Cerium	Praseodymium	Neodymium	Promethium	Samarium	Europium	Gadolinium	Terbium	Dysprosium	Holmium	Erbium	Thulium	Ytterbium	Lutetium	Hafnium	Tantalum	Tungsten	Rhenium	Osmium	Iridium	Platinum	Gold	Mercury (element)	Thallium	Lead	Bismuth	Polonium	Astatine	Radon
Francium	Radium	Actinium	Thorium	Protactinium	Uranium	Neptunium	Plutonium	Americium	Curium	Berkelium	Californium	Einsteinium	Fermium	Mendelevium	Nobelium	Lawrencium	Rutherfordium	Dubnium	Seaborgium	Bohrium	Hassium	Meitnerium	Darmstadtium	Roentgenium	Copernicium	Nihonium	Flerovium	Moscovium	Livermorium	Tennessine	Oganesson
Tm
↑
Md
↓
—
fermium ← mendelevium → nobelium
- Atomic number (Z): 101
- Group: f-block groups (no number)
- Period: period 7
- Block: f-block
- Electron configuration: [Rn] 5f^{13} 7s^{2}
- Electrons per shell: 2, 8, 18, 32, 31, 8, 2

Physical properties
- Phase at STP: solid (predicted)
- Melting point: 1100 K (800 °C, 1500 °F) (predicted)
- Density (near r.t.): 10.3(7) g/cm^{3} (predicted) (Note: The density is calculated from the predicted metallic radius (Silva 2006, p. 1635) and the predicted close-packed crystal structure (Fournier 1976).)

Atomic properties
- Oxidation states: common: +3 +2
- Electronegativity: Pauling scale: 1.3
- Ionization energies: 1st: 636 kJ/mol
- Covalent radius: 173 pm (single-bond)
- Van der Waals radius: 246 pm

Other properties
- Natural occurrence: synthetic
- Crystal structure: face-centered cubic (fcc) (predicted)
- CAS Number: 7440-11-1

History
- Naming: after Dmitri Mendeleev
- Discovery: Lawrence Berkeley National Laboratory (1955)

Isotopes of mendelevium
Main isotopes			Decay	
Isotope	abundance	half-life (t_{1/2})	mode	product
^{256}Md	synth	77.7 min	ε	^{256}Fm
^{256}Md	synth	77.7 min	α	^{252}Es
^{257}Md	synth	5.52 h	ε	^{257}Fm
^{257}Md	synth	5.52 h	α	^{253}Es
^{258}Md	synth	51.6 d	α	^{254}Es
^{259}Md	synth	1.60 h	SF	–
^{260}Md	synth	27.8 d	SF	–

Mendelevium is a synthetic chemical element; it has symbol Md (formerly Mv) and atomic number 101. A metallic radioactive transuranium element in the actinide series, it is the first element by atomic number that currently cannot be produced in macroscopic quantities by neutron bombardment of lighter elements. It is the thirteenth actinide, the ninth transuranic element, and the first transfermium; it is named after Dmitri Mendeleev, the father of the periodic table.

Like all the transfermiums, it can only be produced in particle accelerators by bombarding lighter elements with charged particles. The element was first produced in 1955 by bombarding einsteinium with alpha particles, the method still used today. Using commonly-available microgram quantities of einsteinium-253, over a million mendelevium atoms may be made each hour. The chemistry of mendelevium is typical for the late actinides, with a dominant +3 oxidation state but also a +2 oxidation state accessible in solution. All known isotopes of mendelevium have short half-lives; there are currently no uses for it outside basic scientific research, and only small amounts are produced.

== Discovery ==
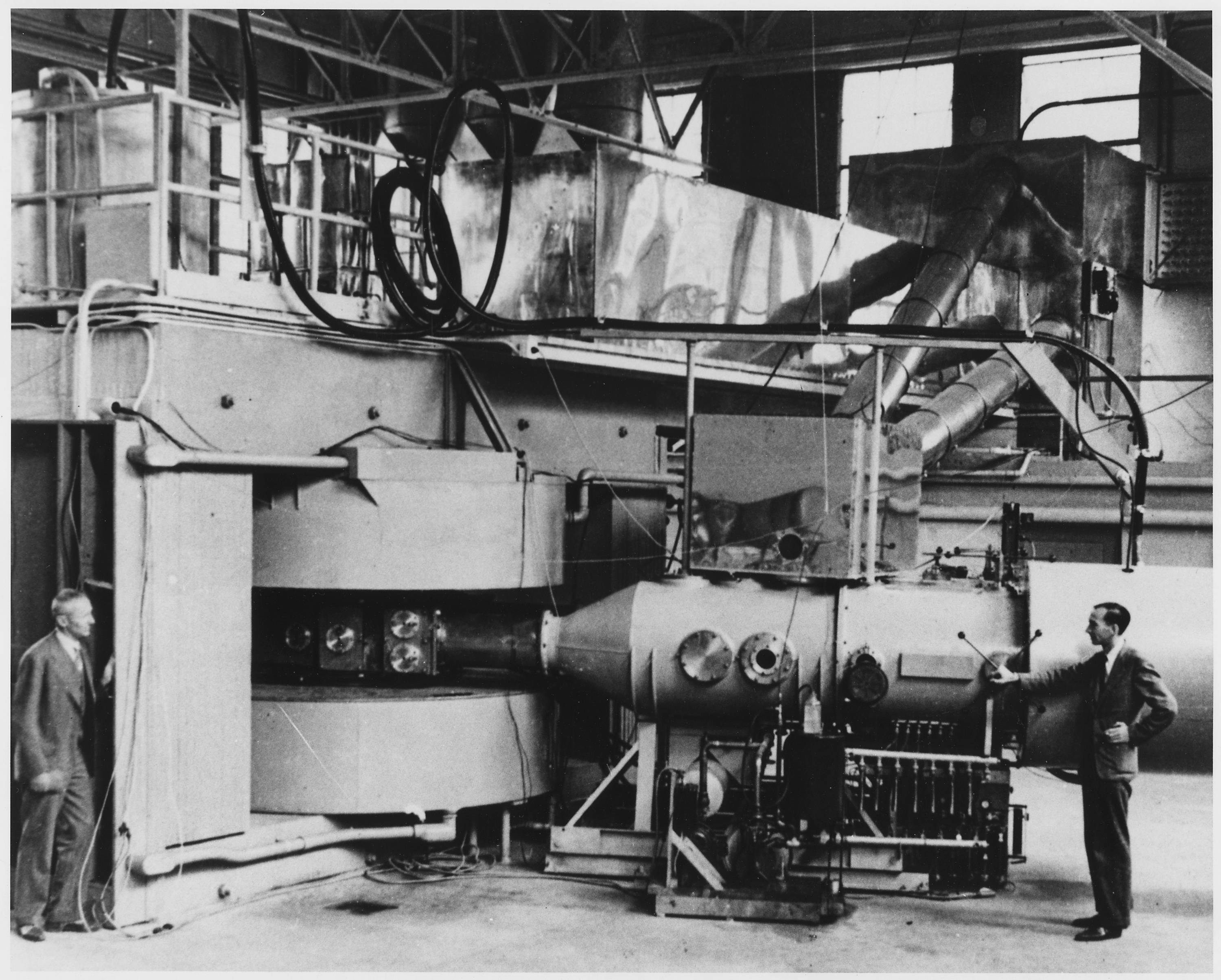
The 60-inch cyclotron at the Lawrence Radiation Laboratory, University of California, Berkeley, in August 1939

Mendelevium was the ninth transuranic element to be synthesized. It was first synthesized by Albert Ghiorso, Glenn T. Seaborg, Gregory Robert Choppin, Bernard G. Harvey, and team leader Stanley G. Thompson in early 1955 at the University of California, Berkeley. The team produced ^{256}Md (half-life 77.7 minutes) when they bombarded an ^{253}Es target consisting of only a billion (10^{9}) einsteinium atoms with alpha particles (helium nuclei) in the Berkeley Radiation Laboratory's 60-inch cyclotron, thus increasing the target's atomic number by two. ^{256}Md thus became the first isotope of any element to be synthesized one atom at a time. In total, seventeen mendelevium atoms were detected. This discovery was part of a program, begun in 1952, that irradiated plutonium with neutrons to transmute it into heavier actinides. This method was necessary because of a lack of known beta decaying isotopes of fermium that might allow production by neutron capture; it is now known that such production is impossible at any possible reactor flux due to the very short half-life to spontaneous fission of ^{258}Fm and subsequent isotopes, which still do not beta decay - the fermium gap that, as far as we know, sets a hard limit to the success of neutron capture processes.

External videos
- Reenactment of the discovery of mendelevium at Berkeley

To predict if the production of mendelevium would be possible, the team made use of a rough calculation. The number of atoms that would be produced would be approximately equal to the product of the number of atoms of target material, the target's cross section, the ion beam intensity, and the time of bombardment; this last factor was related to the half-life of the product when bombarding for a time on the order of its half-life. This gave one atom per experiment. Thus under optimum conditions, the preparation of only one atom of element 101 per experiment could be expected. This calculation demonstrated that it was feasible to go ahead with the experiment. The target material, ^{253}Es, could be produced readily from irradiating plutonium: one year of irradiation would give a billion atoms, and its three-week half-life meant that the element 101 experiments could be conducted in one week after the produced einsteinium was separated and purified to make the target. However, it was necessary to upgrade the cyclotron to obtain the needed intensity of 10^{14} alpha particles per second; Seaborg applied for the necessary funds.

The data sheet, showing stylus tracing and notes, that proved the discovery of mendelevium.

While Seaborg applied for funding, Harvey worked on the einsteinium target, while Thomson and Choppin focused on methods for chemical isolation. Choppin suggested using α-hydroxyisobutyric acid to separate the mendelevium atoms from those of the lighter actinides. The initial separation was done by a recoil technique suggested by Albert Ghiorso: the einsteinium was placed on the opposite side of the target from the beam, so that the momentum of the recoiling mendelevium atoms would allow them to leave the target and be caught on a gold catcher foil behind it. This recoil target was made by an electroplating technique, developed by Alfred Chetham-Strode. This technique gave a very high yield, which was absolutely necessary when working with such a rare and valuable product as the einsteinium target material. The recoil target consisted of 10^{9} atoms of ^{253}Es which were deposited electrolytically on a thin gold foil. It was bombarded by 41 MeV alpha particles in the Berkeley cyclotron with a very high beam density of 6×10^{13} particles per second over an area of 0.05 cm^{2}. The target was cooled by water or liquid helium, and the foil could be replaced.

Initial experiments were carried out in September 1954. No alpha decay was seen from mendelevium atoms; thus, Ghiorso suggested that the mendelevium had all decayed by electron capture to fermium-256, correctly believed to decay primarily by fission, and that the experiment should be repeated, this time searching for those spontaneous fission events. This version of the experiment was performed in February 1955.

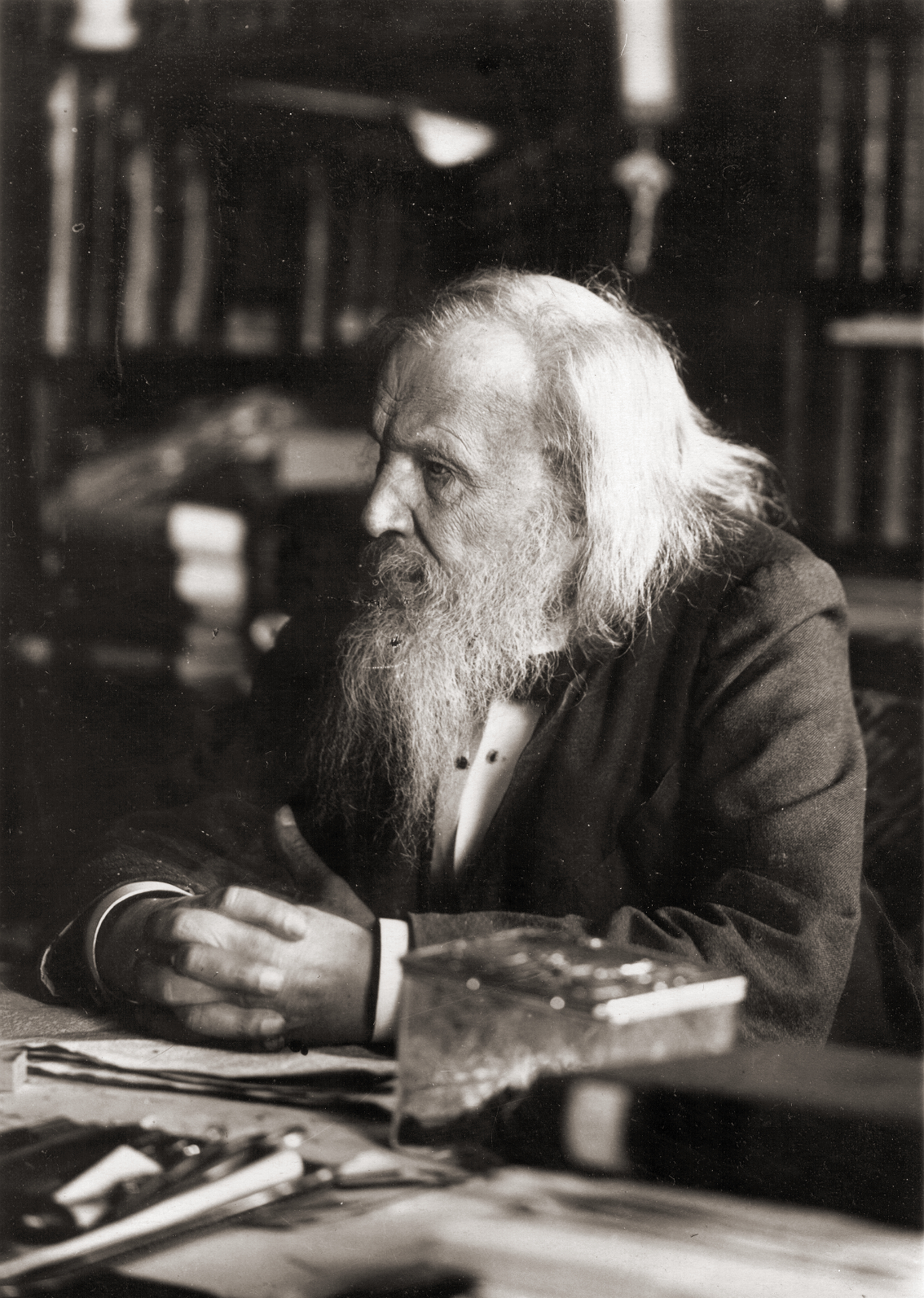
The element was named after Dmitri Mendeleev.

On the day of discovery, 19 February, alpha irradiation of the einsteinium target occurred in three three-hour sessions. The cyclotron was in the University of California campus, while the Radiation Laboratory was on the next hill. To deal with this situation, a complex procedure was used: Ghiorso took the catcher foils (there were three targets and three foils) from the cyclotron to Harvey, who would use aqua regia to dissolve it and pass it through an anion-exchange resin column to separate the transuranium elements from the gold and other products. The resultant drops entered a test tube, which Choppin and Ghiorso took in a car to get to the Radiation Laboratory as soon as possible. Thompson and Choppin used a cation-exchange resin column and the α-hydroxyisobutyric acid. The solution drops were collected on platinum disks and dried under heat lamps. The three disks were expected to contain, respectively, the fermium, no new elements, and the mendelevium. Finally, they were placed in their own counters, which were connected to recorders such that spontaneous fission events would be recorded as huge deflections in a graph showing the number and time of the decays. There thus was no direct detection, but by observation of spontaneous fission events arising from its electron-capture daughter ^{256}Fm. The first one was identified with a "hooray" followed by a "double hooray" and a "triple hooray". The fourth one eventually officially proved the chemical identification of the 101st element, mendelevium. In total, five decays were reported up until 4 a.m. Seaborg was notified and the team left to sleep. Additional analysis and further experimentation showed the produced mendelevium isotope to have the expected mass of 256 and decay by electron capture to fermium-256 (half-life 157.6 minutes), the source of the observed fission.

We thought it fitting that there be an element named for the Russian chemist Dmitri Mendeleev, who had developed the periodic table. In nearly all our experiments discovering transuranium elements, we'd depended on his method of predicting chemical properties based on the element's position in the table. But in the middle of the Cold War, naming an element for a Russian was a somewhat bold gesture that did not sit well with some American critics.

— Glenn T. Seaborg

Being the first of the second hundred of the chemical elements, it was decided that the element would be named "mendelevium" after the Russian chemist Dmitri Mendeleev, father of the periodic table. Because this discovery came during the Cold War, Seaborg had to request permission from the government of the United States to propose that the element be named for a Russian, but it was granted. The name "mendelevium" was accepted by the International Union of Pure and Applied Chemistry (IUPAC) in 1955 with symbol "Mv", which was changed to "Md" in the next IUPAC General Assembly (Paris, 1957).

== Characteristics ==
=== Physical ===
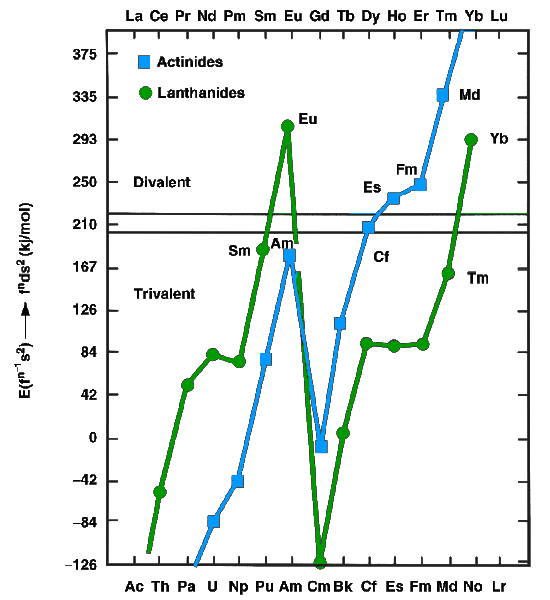
Energy required to promote an f electron to the d subshell for the f-block lanthanides and actinides. Above around 210 kJ/mol, this energy is too high to be provided for by the greater crystal energy of the trivalent state and thus einsteinium, fermium, and mendelevium form divalent metals like the lanthanides europium and ytterbium. (Nobelium is also expected to form a divalent metal, but this has not yet been confirmed.)

In the periodic table, mendelevium is located to the right of the actinide fermium, to the left of the actinide nobelium, and below the lanthanide thulium. Mendelevium metal has not yet been prepared in bulk quantities, and bulk preparation is currently impossible. Nevertheless, a number of predictions and some preliminary experimental results have been done regarding its properties.

The lanthanides and actinides, in the metallic state, can exist as either divalent (such as europium and ytterbium) or trivalent (most other lanthanides) metals. The former have f^{n}s^{2} configurations, whereas the latter have f^{n−1}d^{1}s^{2} configurations. In 1975, Johansson and Rosengren examined the measured and predicted values for the cohesive energies (enthalpies of crystallization) of the metallic lanthanides and actinides, both as divalent and trivalent metals. The conclusion was that the increased binding energy of the [Rn]5f^{12}6d^{1}7s^{2} configuration over the [Rn]5f^{13}7s^{2} configuration for mendelevium was not enough to compensate for the energy needed to promote one 5f electron to 6d, as is true also for the very late actinides: thus einsteinium, fermium, mendelevium, and nobelium were expected to be divalent metals. The increasing predominance of the divalent state well before the actinide series concludes is attributed to the relativistic stabilization of the 5f electrons, which increases with increasing atomic number. Thermochromatographic studies with trace quantities of mendelevium by Zvara and Hübener from 1976 to 1982 confirmed this prediction. In 1990, Haire and Gibson estimated mendelevium metal to have an enthalpy of sublimation between 134 and 142 kJ/mol. Divalent mendelevium metal should have a metallic radius of around 194±10 pm. Like the other divalent late actinides (except the once again trivalent lawrencium), metallic mendelevium should assume a face-centered cubic crystal structure. Mendelevium's melting point has been estimated at 800 °C, the same value as that predicted for the neighbouring element nobelium. Its density is predicted to be around 10.3±0.7 g/cm^{3}.

=== Chemical ===
The chemistry of mendelevium is known largely in solution (as available quantities do not allow the creation of pure compounds), in which it can take on the +3 or +2 oxidation states. The +1 state has also been reported, but has not yet been confirmed.

Before mendelevium's discovery, Seaborg and Katz predicted that it should be predominantly trivalent in aqueous solution and hence should behave similarly to other tripositive lanthanides and actinides. After the synthesis of mendelevium in 1955, these predictions were confirmed, first in the observation at its discovery that it eluted just after fermium in the trivalent actinide elution sequence from a cation-exchange column of resin, and later the 1967 observation that mendelevium could form insoluble hydroxides and fluorides that coprecipitated with trivalent lanthanide salts. Cation-exchange and solvent extraction studies led to the conclusion that mendelevium was a trivalent actinide with an ionic radius somewhat smaller than that of the previous actinide, fermium. Mendelevium can form coordination complexes with 1,2-cyclohexanedinitrilotetraacetic acid (DCTA).

In reducing conditions, mendelevium(III) can be easily reduced to mendelevium(II), which is stable in aqueous solution. The standard reduction potential of the E°(Md^{3+}→Md^{2+}) couple was variously estimated in 1967 as −0.10 V or −0.20 V: later 2013 experiments established the value as −0.16±0.05 V. In comparison, E°(Md^{3+}→Md^{0}) should be around −1.74 V, and E°(Md^{2+}→Md^{0}) should be around −2.5 V. Mendelevium(II)'s elution behavior has been compared with that of strontium(II) and europium(II).

In 1973, mendelevium(I) was reported to have been produced by Russian scientists, who obtained it by reducing higher oxidation states of mendelevium with samarium(II). It was found to be stable in neutral water–ethanol solution and be homologous to caesium(I). However, later experiments found no evidence for mendelevium(I) and found that mendelevium behaved like divalent elements when reduced, not like the monovalent alkali metals. Nevertheless, the Russian team conducted further studies on the thermodynamics of cocrystallizing mendelevium with alkali metal chlorides, and concluded that mendelevium(I) had formed and could form mixed crystals with divalent elements, thus cocrystallizing with them. The status of the +1 oxidation state is still tentative.

The electrode potential E°(Md^{4+}→Md^{3+}) was predicted in 1975 to be +5.4 V; 1967 experiments with the strong oxidizing agent sodium bismuthate were unable to oxidize mendelevium(III) to mendelevium(IV).

=== Atomic ===
A mendelevium atom has 101 electrons. They are expected to be arranged in the configuration [Rn]5f^{13}7s^{2} (ground state term symbol ^{2}F_{7/2}), although experimental verification of this electron configuration had not yet been made as of 2006. The fifteen electrons in the 5f and 7s subshells are valence electrons. In forming compounds, three valence electrons may be lost, leaving behind a [Rn]5f^{12} core: this conforms to the trend set by the other actinides with their [Rn] 5f^{n} electron configurations in the tripositive state. The first ionization potential of mendelevium was measured to be at most (6.58 ± 0.07) eV in 1974, based on the assumption that the 7s electrons would ionise before the 5f ones; this value has not yet been refined further due to the lack to larger samples of mendelevium. The ionic radius of hexacoordinate Md^{3+} had been preliminarily estimated in 1978 to be around 91.2 pm; 1988 calculations based on the logarithmic trend between distribution coefficients and ionic radius produced a value of 89.6 pm, as well as an enthalpy of hydration of −3654±12 kJ/mol. Md^{2+} should have an ionic radius of 115 pm and hydration enthalpy −1413 kJ/mol; Md^{+} should have ionic radius 117 pm.

=== Isotopes ===
Seventeen isotopes of mendelevium are known, with mass numbers from 244 to 260; all are radioactive. The longest-lived isotope is ^{258}Md with a half-life of 51.6 days. Nevertheless, the shorter-lived ^{256}Md (half-life 77.7 minutes) is more often used in chemical experiments because it can be produced in larger quantities from einsteinium, as ^{258}Md would require ^{255}Es, of which significant quantities are available only as a minor component of an isotopic mixture.

The half-lives of mendelevium isotopes mostly increase smoothly (apart from odd/even effects) toward higher mass, up to ^{258}Md, then decrease (as indicated by what experimental data is available) as spontaneous fission becomes the dominant decay mode; the second longest-living isotope is ^{260}Md, the heaviest known, with a half-life of 27.8 days. Mendelevium is the last element that has any known isotope with a half-life longer than a day.

Mendelevium-256, the currently most important isotope of mendelevium, decays about 90% through electron capture and 10% through alpha decay. It is most easily detected through the spontaneous fission of its electron capture daughter fermium-256, but in the presence of other nuclides that undergo spontaneous fission, alpha decays at the characteristic energies for mendelevium-256 (7.205 and 7.139 MeV) can provide more useful identification.

== Production and isolation ==
The lightest isotopes (^{244}Md to ^{247}Md) are mostly produced through bombardment of bismuth targets with argon ions, while slightly heavier ones (^{248}Md to ^{253}Md) are produced by bombarding plutonium and americium targets with ions of carbon and nitrogen. The most important and most stable isotopes are in the range from ^{254}Md to ^{258}Md and are produced through bombardment of einsteinium with alpha particles: einsteinium-253, −254, and −255 can all be used. ^{259}Md is produced as a daughter of ^{259}No, and ^{260}Md can be produced in a transfer reaction between einsteinium-254 and oxygen-18. Typically, the most commonly used isotope ^{256}Md is produced by bombarding either einsteinium-253 or −254 with alpha particles: einsteinium-254 is preferred when available because it has a longer half-life and therefore can be used as a target for longer. Using available microgram quantities of einsteinium, femtogram quantities of mendelevium-256 may be produced.

The recoil momentum of the produced mendelevium-256 atoms is used to bring them physically far away from the einsteinium target from which they are produced, bringing them onto a thin foil of metal (usually beryllium, aluminium, platinum, or gold) just behind the target in a vacuum. This eliminates the need for immediate chemical separation, which is both costly and prevents reusing of the expensive einsteinium target. The mendelevium atoms are then trapped in a gas atmosphere (frequently helium), and a gas jet from a small opening in the reaction chamber carries the mendelevium along. Using a long capillary tube, and including potassium chloride aerosols in the helium gas, the mendelevium atoms can be transported over tens of meters to be chemically analysed and have their quantity determined. The mendelevium can then be separated from the foil material and other fission products by applying acid to the foil and then coprecipitating the mendelevium with lanthanum fluoride, then using a cation-exchange resin column with a 10% ethanol solution saturated with hydrochloric acid, acting as an eluant. However, if the foil is made of gold and thin enough, it is enough to simply dissolve the gold in aqua regia before separating the trivalent actinides from the gold using anion-exchange chromatography, the eluant being 6 M hydrochloric acid.

Mendelevium can finally be separated from the other trivalent actinides using selective elution from a cation-exchange resin column, the eluant being ammonia α-HIB.< Using the gas-jet method often renders the first two steps unnecessary.

Another possible way to separate the trivalent actinides is via solvent extraction chromatography using bis-(2-ethylhexyl) phosphoric acid (abbreviated as HDEHP) as the stationary organic phase and nitric acid as the mobile aqueous phase. The actinide elution sequence is reversed from that of the cation-exchange resin column, so that the heavier actinides elute later. The mendelevium separated by this method has the advantage of being free of organic complexing agent compared to the resin column; the disadvantage is that mendelevium then elutes very late in the elution sequence, after fermium.

Another method to isolate mendelevium exploits the distinct elution properties of Md^{2+} from those of Es^{3+} and Fm^{3+}. The initial steps are the same as above, and employs HDEHP for extraction chromatography, but coprecipitates the mendelevium with terbium fluoride instead of lanthanum fluoride. Then, 50 mg of chromium is added to the mendelevium to reduce it to the +2 state in 0.1 M hydrochloric acid with zinc or mercury. The solvent extraction then proceeds, and while the trivalent and tetravalent lanthanides and actinides remain on the column, mendelevium(II) does not and stays in the hydrochloric acid. It is then reoxidized to the +3 state using hydrogen peroxide and then isolated by selective elution with 2 M hydrochloric acid (to remove impurities, including chromium) and finally 6 M hydrochloric acid (to remove the mendelevium). It is also possible to use a column of cationite and zinc amalgam, using 1 M hydrochloric acid as an eluant, to effect the reduction. Thermochromatographic chemical isolation could be achieved using the volatile mendelevium hexafluoroacetylacetonate: the analogous fermium compound is known and similar.

== Toxicity ==
Though few people come in contact with mendelevium, the International Commission on Radiological Protection has set annual exposure limits for the most stable isotope. For mendelevium-258, the ingestion limit was set at 9×10^{5} becquerels (1 Bq = 1 decay per second). Given the half-life of this isotope, this is only 2.48 ng (nanograms). The inhalation limit is at 6000 Bq or 16.5 pg (picograms).

== Bibliography ==
- Silva, Robert J. (2006). "Fermium, Mendelevium, Nobelium, and Lawrencium" (PDF). In Morss, Lester R.; Edelstein, Norman M.; Fuger, Jean (eds.). The Chemistry of the Actinide and Transactinide Elements. Vol. 3 (3rd ed.). Dordrecht: Springer. pp. 1621–1651. doi:10.1007/1-4020-3598-5_13. ISBN 978-1-4020-3555-5. Archived from the original (PDF) on 2010-07-17.
