= Transuranium element =

Element whose atomic number is greater than 92

The transuranium (or transuranic) elements are the chemical elements with atomic number greater than 92, which is the atomic number of uranium. All of them are radioactively unstable and decay into other elements. They are synthetic and none occur naturally on Earth, except for neptunium and plutonium which have been found in trace amounts in naturally occurring uranium ore.

== Overview ==
Periodic table with elements colored according to the half-life of their most stable isotope.

Of the elements with atomic numbers 1 to 92, most can be found in nature, having stable isotopes (such as lead) or very long-lived radioisotopes (such as uranium), or existing as common decay products of the decay of uranium and thorium (such as radium). The exceptions are technetium, promethium, astatine, and francium; all four occur in nature, but only in very minor branches of the uranium and thorium decay chains, and thus all except francium were first discovered by synthesis in the laboratory rather than in nature.

All elements with higher atomic numbers have been first discovered in the laboratory, with neptunium and plutonium (the first two of these) later discovered in nature. They are all radioactive, with a half-life much shorter than the age of the Earth, so any primordial (i.e. present at the Earth's formation) atoms of these elements have long since decayed. Trace amounts of neptunium and plutonium form in some uranium-rich rock, and small amounts are produced during atmospheric tests of nuclear weapons. These two elements are generated by neutron capture in uranium ore with subsequent beta decays (e.g. ^{238}U + n → ^{239}U → ^{239}Np → ^{239}Pu).

All elements beyond plutonium are entirely synthetic, at least on Earth; they are created in nuclear reactors or particle accelerators. The half-lives of these elements show a general trend of decreasing as atomic numbers increase. There are exceptions, however, including several isotopes of curium and dubnium. Some heavier elements in this series, around atomic numbers 110–114, are thought to break the trend and demonstrate increased nuclear stability, comprising the theoretical island of stability.

Transuranic elements are difficult and expensive to produce, and their prices increase rapidly with atomic number. As of 2008, the cost of weapons-grade plutonium was around $4,000/gram, and californium exceeded $60,000,000/gram. Einsteinium is the heaviest element that has been produced in macroscopic quantities.

Transuranic elements that have not been discovered, or have been discovered but are not yet officially named, use IUPAC's systematic element names. The naming of transuranic elements may be a source of controversy.

== Discoveries ==
So far, essentially all transuranium elements have been discovered at four laboratories: Lawrence Berkeley National Laboratory (LBNL) in the United States (elements 93–101, 106, and joint credit for 103–105), the GSI Helmholtz Centre for Heavy Ion Research in Germany (elements 107–112), RIKEN in Japan (element 113), and the Joint Institute for Nuclear Research (JINR) in Russia (elements 102 and 114–118, and joint credit for 103–105).

- The Radiation Laboratory (now LBNL) at University of California, Berkeley, led principally by Edwin McMillan, Glenn Seaborg, and Albert Ghiorso, during 1945–1974:
  - 93. neptunium, Np, named after the planet Neptune, as it follows uranium and Neptune follows Uranus in the planetary sequence (1940).
  - 94. plutonium, Pu, named after Pluto, (Note: Pluto was a planet at the time of naming, but has since been reclassified as a dwarf planet.) following the same naming rule as it follows neptunium and Pluto follows Neptune in the Solar System (1940).
  - 95. americium, Am, named because it is an analog to europium, and so was named after the continent where it was first produced (1944).
  - 96. curium, Cm, named after Pierre and Marie Curie, scientists who separated out the first radioactive elements (1944), as its lighter analog gadolinium was named after Johan Gadolin.
  - 97. berkelium, Bk, named after Lawrence Berkeley National Laboratory, where it was first synthesized (1949).
  - 98. californium, Cf, named after California, where LBNL is located (1950).
  - 99. einsteinium, Es, named after Albert Einstein (1952).
  - 100. fermium, Fm, named after Enrico Fermi, the physicist who produced the first controlled chain reaction (1952).
  - 101. mendelevium, Md, named after Russian chemist Dmitri Mendeleev, credited for being the primary creator of the periodic table of the chemical elements (1955).
  - 102. nobelium, No, named after Alfred Nobel (1958). The element was originally claimed by a team at the Nobel Institute in Sweden (1957) – though it later became apparent that the Swedish team had not discovered the element, the LBNL team decided to adopt their name nobelium. This discovery was also claimed by JINR, which doubted the LBNL claim, and named the element joliotium (Jl) after Frédéric Joliot-Curie (1965). IUPAC concluded that the JINR had been the first to convincingly synthesize the element (1965), but retained the name nobelium as deeply entrenched in the literature.
  - 103. lawrencium, Lr, named after Ernest Lawrence, a physicist best known for development of the cyclotron, and the person for whom Lawrence Livermore National Laboratory and LBNL (which hosted the creation of these transuranium elements) are named (1961). This discovery was also claimed by the JINR (1965), which doubted the LBNL claim and proposed the name rutherfordium (Rf) after Ernest Rutherford. IUPAC concluded that credit should be shared, retaining the name lawrencium as entrenched in the literature.
  - 104. rutherfordium, Rf, named after Ernest Rutherford, who was responsible for the concept of the atomic nucleus (1969). This discovery was also claimed by JINR, led principally by Georgy Flyorov: they named the element kurchatovium (Ku), after Igor Kurchatov. IUPAC concluded that credit should be shared, and adopted the LBNL name rutherfordium.
  - 105. dubnium, Db, an element that is named after Dubna, where JINR is located. Originally named hahnium (Ha) in honor of Otto Hahn by the Berkeley group (1970). This discovery was also claimed by JINR, which named it nielsbohrium (Ns) after Niels Bohr. IUPAC concluded that credit should be shared, and renamed the element dubnium to honour the JINR team.
  - 106. seaborgium, Sg, named after Glenn T. Seaborg. This name caused controversy because Seaborg was still alive, but it eventually became accepted by international chemists (1974). This discovery was also claimed by JINR. IUPAC concluded that the Berkeley team had been the first to convincingly synthesize the element.
- The Gesellschaft für Schwerionenforschung (Society for Heavy Ion Research) in Darmstadt, Hessen, Germany, led principally by Gottfried Münzenberg, Peter Armbruster, and Sigurd Hofmann, during 1980–2000:
  - 107. bohrium, Bh, named after Danish physicist Niels Bohr, important in the elucidation of the structure of the atom (1981). This discovery was also claimed by JINR. IUPAC concluded that the GSI had been the first to convincingly synthesise the element. The GSI team had originally proposed nielsbohrium (Ns) to resolve the naming dispute on element 105, but this was changed by IUPAC as there was no precedent for using a scientist's first name in an element name.
  - 108. hassium, Hs, named after the Latin form of the name of Hessen, the German Bundesland where this work was performed (1984). This discovery was also claimed by JINR. IUPAC concluded that the GSI had been the first to convincingly synthesize the element, while acknowledging the pioneering work at JINR.
  - 109. meitnerium, Mt, named after Lise Meitner, an Austrian physicist who was one of the earliest scientists to study nuclear fission (1982).
  - 110. darmstadtium, Ds, named after Darmstadt, Germany, the city in which this work was performed (1994). This discovery was also claimed by JINR, which proposed the name becquerelium after Henri Becquerel, and by LBNL, which proposed the name hahnium to resolve the dispute on element 105 (despite having protested the reusing of established names for different elements). IUPAC concluded that GSI had been the first to convincingly synthesize the element.
  - 111. roentgenium, Rg, named after Wilhelm Röntgen, discoverer of X-rays (1994).
  - 112. copernicium, Cn, named after astronomer Nicolaus Copernicus (1996).
- RIKEN in Wakō, Saitama, Japan, led principally by Kōsuke Morita:
  - 113. nihonium, Nh, named after Japan (Nihon in Japanese) where the element was discovered (2004). This discovery was also claimed by JINR. IUPAC concluded that RIKEN had been the first to convincingly synthesize the element.
- JINR in Dubna, Russia, led principally by Yuri Oganessian, in collaboration with several other labs including Lawrence Livermore National Laboratory (LLNL), since 2000:
  - 114. flerovium, Fl, named after the Flerov Laboratory of Nuclear Reactions in JINR (1999).
  - 115. moscovium, Mc, named after Moscow Oblast, where the element was discovered (2004).
  - 116. livermorium, Lv, named after Lawrence Livermore National Laboratory, a collaborator with JINR in the discovery (2000).
  - 117. tennessine, Ts, after Tennessee, the location of Oak Ridge National Laboratory (2010).
  - 118. oganesson, Og, after Yuri Oganessian, who led the JINR team in its discovery of elements 114 to 118 (2002).

== Superheavy elements ==
Superheavy elements, (also known as superheavies, or superheavy atoms, commonly abbreviated SHE) usually refer to the transactinide elements beginning with rutherfordium (atomic number 104). (Lawrencium, the first 6d element, is sometimes but not always included as well.) They have only been made artificially and currently serve no practical purpose because their short half-lives cause them to decay after a very short time, ranging from a few hours to just milliseconds, which also makes them extremely hard to study.

Superheavies have all been created since the latter half of the 20th century and are continually being created during the 21st century as technology advances. They are created through the bombardment of elements in a particle accelerator, in quantities on the atomic scale, and no method of mass creation has been found.

== Applications ==
Transuranic elements may be used to synthesize superheavy elements. Elements of the island of stability have potentially important military applications, including the development of compact nuclear weapons. The potential everyday applications are vast; americium is used in devices such as smoke detectors and spectrometers.

== See also ==
- Bose–Einstein condensate (also known as superatom)
- Minor actinide
- Deep geological repository, a place to deposit transuranic waste
