= Nihonium =

Nihonium, _{113}Nh
Nihonium
- Pronunciation: /nɪˈhoʊniəm/ (nih-HOH-nee-əm)
- Mass number: [286]

Nihonium in the periodic table
Hydrogen																															Helium
Lithium	Beryllium																									Boron	Carbon	Nitrogen	Oxygen	Fluorine	Neon
Sodium	Magnesium																									Aluminium	Silicon	Phosphorus	Sulfur	Chlorine	Argon
Potassium	Calcium															Scandium	Titanium	Vanadium	Chromium	Manganese	Iron	Cobalt	Nickel	Copper	Zinc	Gallium	Germanium	Arsenic	Selenium	Bromine	Krypton
Rubidium	Strontium															Yttrium	Zirconium	Niobium	Molybdenum	Technetium	Ruthenium	Rhodium	Palladium	Silver	Cadmium	Indium	Tin	Antimony	Tellurium	Iodine	Xenon
Caesium	Barium	Lanthanum	Cerium	Praseodymium	Neodymium	Promethium	Samarium	Europium	Gadolinium	Terbium	Dysprosium	Holmium	Erbium	Thulium	Ytterbium	Lutetium	Hafnium	Tantalum	Tungsten	Rhenium	Osmium	Iridium	Platinum	Gold	Mercury (element)	Thallium	Lead	Bismuth	Polonium	Astatine	Radon
Francium	Radium	Actinium	Thorium	Protactinium	Uranium	Neptunium	Plutonium	Americium	Curium	Berkelium	Californium	Einsteinium	Fermium	Mendelevium	Nobelium	Lawrencium	Rutherfordium	Dubnium	Seaborgium	Bohrium	Hassium	Meitnerium	Darmstadtium	Roentgenium	Copernicium	Nihonium	Flerovium	Moscovium	Livermorium	Tennessine	Oganesson
Tl
↑
Nh
↓
—
copernicium ← nihonium → flerovium
- Atomic number (Z): 113
- Group: group 13 (boron group)
- Period: period 7
- Block: p-block
- Electron configuration: [Rn] 5f^{14} 6d^{10} 7s^{2} 7p^{1} (predicted)
- Electrons per shell: 2, 8, 18, 32, 32, 18, 3 (predicted)

Physical properties
- Phase at STP: solid (predicted)
- Melting point: 700 K (430 °C, 810 °F) (predicted)
- Boiling point: 1430 K (1130 °C, 2070 °F) (predicted)
- Density (near r.t.): 16 g/cm^{3} (predicted)
- Heat of fusion: 7.61 kJ/mol (extrapolated)
- Heat of vaporisation: 130 kJ/mol (predicted)

Atomic properties
- Oxidation states: common: (none)
- Ionisation energies: 1st: 704.9 kJ/mol (predicted); 2nd: 2240 kJ/mol (predicted); 3rd: 3020 kJ/mol (predicted); (more)
- Atomic radius: empirical: 170 pm (predicted)
- Covalent radius: 172–180 pm (extrapolated)

Other properties
- Natural occurrence: synthetic
- Crystal structure: hexagonal close-packed (hcp) (predicted)
- CAS Number: 54084-70-7

History
- Naming: After Japan (Nihon in Japanese)
- Discovery: Riken (Japan, first undisputed claim 2004); JINR (Russia) and Livermore (US, first announcement 2003)

Isotopes of nihonium
Main isotopes			Decay	
Isotope	abundance	half-life (t_{1/2})	mode	product
^{278}Nh	synth	2.0 ms	α	^{274}Rg
^{282}Nh	synth	61 ms	α	^{278}Rg
^{283}Nh	synth	123 ms	α	^{279}Rg
^{284}Nh	synth	0.90 s	α	^{280}Rg
^{284}Nh	synth	0.90 s	ε	^{284}Cn
^{285}Nh	synth	2.1 s	α	^{281}Rg
^{285}Nh	synth	2.1 s	SF	–
^{286}Nh	synth	9.5 s	α	^{282}Rg
^{287}Nh	synth	5.5 s?	α	^{283}Rg
^{290}Nh	synth	2 s?	α	^{286}Rg

Nihonium is a synthetic chemical element; it has symbol Nh and atomic number 113. It is extremely radioactive: its most stable known isotope, nihonium-286, has a half-life of about 10 seconds. In the periodic table, nihonium is a transactinide element in the p-block. It is a member of period 7 and group 13.

Nihonium was first reported to have been created in experiments carried out between 14 July and 10 August 2003, by a Russian–American collaboration at the Joint Institute for Nuclear Research (JINR) in Dubna, Russia, working in collaboration with the Lawrence Livermore National Laboratory in Livermore, California, and on 23 July 2004, by a team of Japanese scientists at Riken in Wakō, Japan. The confirmation of their claims in the ensuing years involved independent teams of scientists working in the United States, Germany, Sweden, and China, as well as the original claimants in Russia and Japan. In 2015, the IUPAC/IUPAP Joint Working Party recognised the element and assigned the priority of the discovery and naming rights for the element to Riken. The Riken team suggested the name nihonium in 2016, which was approved in the same year. The name comes from the common Japanese name for Japan (日本, Nihon).

Very little is known about nihonium, as it has been made only in very small amounts that decay within seconds. The anomalously long lives of some superheavy nuclides, including some nihonium isotopes, are explained by the island of stability theory. Experiments to date have supported the theory, with the half-lives of the confirmed nihonium isotopes increasing from milliseconds to seconds as neutrons are added and the island is approached. Nihonium has been calculated to have similar properties to its homologues boron, aluminium, gallium, indium, and thallium. All but boron are post-transition metals, and nihonium is expected to be a post-transition metal as well. It should also show several major differences from them; for example, nihonium should be more stable in the +1 oxidation state than the +3 state, like thallium, but in the +1 state nihonium should behave more like silver and astatine than thallium. Preliminary experiments have shown that elemental nihonium is not very volatile, and that it is less reactive than its lighter homologue thallium.

== Introduction ==
=== Synthesis of superheavy nuclei ===
A graphic depiction of a nuclear fusion reaction. Two nuclei fuse into one, emitting a neutron. Reactions that created new elements to this moment were similar, though varying numbers of neutrons – or alternatively charged particles – may be emitted instead.

A superheavy (Note: In nuclear physics, an element is called heavy if its atomic number is high; lead (element 82) is one example of such a heavy element. The term "superheavy elements" typically refers to elements with atomic number greater than 103 (although there are other definitions, such as atomic number greater than 100 or 112; sometimes, the term is presented an equivalent to the term "transactinide", which puts an upper limit before the beginning of the hypothetical superactinide series). Terms "heavy isotopes" (of a given element) and "heavy nuclei" mean what could be understood in the common language—isotopes of high mass (for the given element) and nuclei of high mass, respectively.) atomic nucleus is created in a nuclear reaction that combines two other nuclei of unequal size (Note: In 2009, a team at the JINR led by Oganessian published results of their attempt to create hassium in a symmetric ^{136}Xe + ^{136}Xe reaction. They failed to observe a single atom in such a reaction, putting the upper limit on the cross section, the measure of probability of a nuclear reaction, as 2.5 pb. In comparison, the reaction that resulted in hassium discovery, ^{208}Pb + ^{58}Fe, had a cross section of ~20 pb (more specifically, 19^{+19}_{-11} pb), as estimated by the discoverers.) into one; roughly, the more unequal the two nuclei in terms of mass, the greater the possibility that the two react. The material made of the heavier nuclei is made into a target, which is then bombarded by the beam of lighter nuclei. Two nuclei can only fuse into one if they are close enough to each other; normally, nuclei (all positively charged) repel each other due to electrostatic repulsion. The strong interaction can overcome this repulsion but only within a very short distance from a nucleus; beam nuclei are thus greatly accelerated in order to make such repulsion insignificant compared to the velocity of the beam nucleus. The energy applied to the beam nuclei to accelerate them can cause them to reach speeds as high as one-tenth of the speed of light. However, if too much energy is applied, the beam nucleus can fall apart.

Coming close enough alone is not enough for two nuclei to fuse: when two nuclei approach each other, they usually remain together for about 10^{−20} seconds and then part ways (not necessarily in the same composition as before the reaction) rather than form a single nucleus. This happens because during the attempted formation of a single nucleus, electrostatic repulsion tears apart the nucleus that is being formed. Each pair of a target and a beam is characterized by its cross section—the probability that fusion will occur if two nuclei approach one another expressed in terms of the transverse area that the incident particle must hit in order for the fusion to occur. (Note: The amount of energy applied to the beam particle to accelerate it can also influence the value of cross section. For example, in the ^{28}_{14}Si + ^{1}_{0}n → ^{28}_{13}Al + ^{1}_{1}p reaction, cross section changes smoothly from 370 mb at 12.3 MeV to 160 mb at 18.3 MeV, with a broad peak at 13.5 MeV with the maximum value of 380 mb.) This fusion may occur as a result of the quantum effect in which nuclei can tunnel through electrostatic repulsion. If the two nuclei can stay close past that phase, multiple nuclear interactions result in redistribution of energy and an energy equilibrium.

External videos
- Visualization of unsuccessful nuclear fusion, based on calculations from the Australian National University

The resulting merger is an excited state—termed a compound nucleus—and thus it is very unstable. To reach a more stable state, the temporary merger may fission without formation of a more stable nucleus. Alternatively, the compound nucleus may eject a few neutrons, which would carry away the excitation energy; if the latter is not sufficient for a neutron expulsion, the merger would produce a gamma ray. This happens in about 10^{−16} seconds after the initial nuclear collision and results in creation of a more stable nucleus. The definition by the IUPAC/IUPAP Joint Working Party (JWP) states that a chemical element can only be recognized as discovered if a nucleus of it exists for at least 10^{−14} seconds. This value was chosen as an estimate of how long it takes a nucleus to acquire electrons and thus display its chemical properties. (Note: This figure also marks the generally accepted upper limit for lifetime of a compound nucleus.)

=== Decay and detection ===
The beam passes through the target and reaches the next chamber, the separator; if a new nucleus is produced, it is carried with this beam. In the separator, the newly produced nucleus is separated from other nuclides (that of the original beam and any other reaction products) (Note: This separation is based on that the resulting nuclei move past the target more slowly then the unreacted beam nuclei. The separator contains electric and magnetic fields whose effects on a moving particle cancel out for a specific velocity of a particle. Such separation can also be aided by a time-of-flight measurement and a recoil energy measurement; a combination of the two may allow to estimate the mass of a nucleus.) and transferred to a surface-barrier detector, which stops the nucleus. The exact location of the upcoming impact on the detector is marked; also marked are its energy and the time of the arrival. The transfer takes about 10^{−6} seconds; in order to be detected, the nucleus must survive this long. The nucleus is recorded again once its decay is registered, and the location, the energy, and the time of the decay are measured.

Stability of a nucleus is provided by the strong interaction. However, its range is very short; as nuclei become larger, its influence on the outermost nucleons (protons and neutrons) weakens. At the same time, the nucleus is torn apart by electrostatic repulsion between protons, and its range is not limited. Total binding energy provided by the strong interaction increases linearly with the number of nucleons, whereas electrostatic repulsion increases with the square of the atomic number, i.e. the latter grows faster and becomes increasingly important for heavy and superheavy nuclei. Superheavy nuclei are thus theoretically predicted and have so far been observed to predominantly decay via decay modes that are caused by such repulsion: alpha decay and spontaneous fission. (Note: Not all decay modes are caused by electrostatic repulsion. For example, beta decay is caused by the weak interaction.) Almost all alpha emitters have over 210 nucleons, and the lightest nuclide primarily undergoing spontaneous fission has 238. In both decay modes, nuclei are inhibited from decaying by corresponding energy barriers for each mode, but they can be tunneled through.

Scheme of an apparatus for creation of superheavy elements, based on the Dubna Gas-Filled Recoil Separator set up in the Flerov Laboratory of Nuclear Reactions in JINR. The trajectory within the detector and the beam focusing apparatus changes because of a dipole magnet in the former and quadrupole magnets in the latter.

Alpha particles are commonly produced in radioactive decays because the mass of an alpha particle per nucleon is small enough to leave some energy for the alpha particle to be used as kinetic energy to leave the nucleus. Spontaneous fission is caused by electrostatic repulsion tearing the nucleus apart and produces various nuclei in different instances of identical nuclei fissioning. As the atomic number increases, spontaneous fission rapidly becomes more important: spontaneous fission partial half-lives decrease by 23 orders of magnitude from uranium (element 92) to nobelium (element 102), and by 30 orders of magnitude from thorium (element 90) to fermium (element 100). The earlier liquid drop model thus suggested that spontaneous fission would occur nearly instantly due to disappearance of the fission barrier for nuclei with about 280 nucleons. The later nuclear shell model suggested that nuclei with about 300 nucleons would form an island of stability in which nuclei will be more resistant to spontaneous fission and will primarily undergo alpha decay with longer half-lives. Subsequent discoveries suggested that the predicted island might be further than originally anticipated; they also showed that nuclei intermediate between the long-lived actinides and the predicted island are deformed, and gain additional stability from shell effects. Experiments on lighter superheavy nuclei, as well as those closer to the expected island, have shown greater than previously anticipated stability against spontaneous fission, showing the importance of shell effects on nuclei. (Note: It was already known by the 1960s that ground states of nuclei differed in energy and shape as well as that certain magic numbers of nucleons corresponded to greater stability of a nucleus. However, it was assumed that there was no nuclear structure in superheavy nuclei as they were too deformed to form one.)

Alpha decays are registered by the emitted alpha particles, and the decay products are easy to determine before the actual decay; if such a decay or a series of consecutive decays produces a known nucleus, the original product of a reaction can be easily determined. (Note: Since mass of a nucleus is not measured directly but is rather calculated from that of another nucleus, such measurement is called indirect. Direct measurements are also possible, but for the most part they have remained unavailable for superheavy nuclei. The first direct measurement of mass of a superheavy nucleus was reported in 2018 at LBNL. Mass was determined from the location of a nucleus after the transfer (the location helps determine its trajectory, which is linked to the mass-to-charge ratio of the nucleus, since the transfer was done in presence of a magnet).) (That all decays within a decay chain were indeed related to each other is established by the location of these decays, which must be in the same place.) The known nucleus can be recognized by the specific characteristics of decay it undergoes such as decay energy (or more specifically, the kinetic energy of the emitted particle). (Note: If the decay occurred in a vacuum, then since total momentum of an isolated system before and after the decay must be preserved, the daughter nucleus would also receive a small velocity. The ratio of the two velocities, and accordingly the ratio of the kinetic energies, would thus be inverse to the ratio of the two masses. The decay energy equals the sum of the known kinetic energy of the alpha particle and that of the daughter nucleus (an exact fraction of the former). The calculations hold for an experiment as well, but the difference is that the nucleus does not move after the decay because it is tied to the detector.) Spontaneous fission, however, produces various nuclei as products, so the original nuclide cannot be determined from its daughters. (Note: Spontaneous fission was discovered by Soviet physicist Georgy Flerov, a leading scientist at JINR, and thus it was a "hobbyhorse" for the facility. In contrast, the LBL scientists believed fission information was not sufficient for a claim of synthesis of an element. They believed spontaneous fission had not been studied enough to use it for identification of a new element, since there was a difficulty of establishing that a compound nucleus had only ejected neutrons and not charged particles like protons or alpha particles. They thus preferred to link new isotopes to the already known ones by successive alpha decays.)

The information available to physicists aiming to synthesize a superheavy element is thus the information collected at the detectors: location, energy, and time of arrival of a particle to the detector, and those of its decay. The physicists analyze this data and seek to conclude that it was indeed caused by a new element and could not have been caused by a different nuclide than the one claimed. Often, provided data is insufficient for a conclusion that a new element was definitely created and there is no other explanation for the observed effects; errors in interpreting data have been made. (Note: For instance, element 102 was mistakenly identified in 1957 at the Nobel Institute of Physics in Stockholm, Stockholm County, Sweden. There were no earlier definitive claims of creation of this element, and the element was assigned a name by its Swedish, American, and British discoverers, nobelium. It was later shown that the identification was incorrect. The following year, RL was unable to reproduce the Swedish results and announced instead their synthesis of the element; that claim was also disproved later. JINR insisted that they were the first to create the element and suggested a name of their own for the new element, joliotium; the Soviet name was also not accepted (JINR later referred to the naming of the element 102 as "hasty"). This name was proposed to IUPAC in a written response to their ruling on priority of discovery claims of elements, signed 29 September 1992. The name "nobelium" remained unchanged on account of its widespread usage.)

== History ==
=== Early indications ===
The syntheses of elements 107 to 112 were conducted at the GSI Helmholtz Centre for Heavy Ion Research in Darmstadt, Germany, from 1981 to 1996. These elements were made by cold fusion (Note: Transactinide elements, such as nihonium, are produced by nuclear fusion. These fusion reactions can be divided into "hot" and "cold" fusion, depending on the excitation energy of the compound nucleus produced. "Cold fusion" in the context of superheavy element synthesis is a distinct concept from the idea that nuclear fusion can be achieved under room temperature conditions. In hot fusion reactions, light, high-energy projectiles are accelerated towards heavy targets (actinides), creating compound nuclei at high excitation energy (~40–50 MeV) that may fission, or alternatively emit several (3 to 5) neutrons. Cold fusion reactions use heavier projectiles, typically from the fourth period, and lighter targets, usually lead and bismuth. The fused nuclei produced have a relatively low excitation energy (~10–20 MeV), which decreases the probability that they will undergo fission reactions. As the fused nuclei cool to the ground state, they emit only one or two neutrons. Hot fusion produces more neutron-rich products because actinides have the highest neutron-to-proton ratios of any elements, and is currently the only method to produce the superheavy elements from flerovium (element 114) onwards.) reactions, in which targets made of lead and bismuth, which are around the stable configuration of 82 protons, are bombarded with heavy ions of period 4 elements. This creates fused nuclei with low excitation energies due to the stability of the targets' nuclei, significantly increasing the yield of superheavy elements. Cold fusion was pioneered by Yuri Oganessian and his team in 1974 at the Joint Institute for Nuclear Research (JINR) in Dubna, Soviet Union. Yields from cold fusion reactions were found to decrease significantly with increasing atomic number; the resulting nuclei were severely neutron-deficient and short-lived. The GSI team attempted to synthesise element 113 via cold fusion in 1998 and 2003, bombarding bismuth-209 with zinc-70; both attempts were unsuccessful.

Faced with this problem, Oganessian and his team at the JINR turned their renewed attention to the older hot fusion technique, in which heavy actinide targets were bombarded with lighter ions. Calcium-48 was suggested as an ideal projectile, because it is very neutron-rich for a light element (combined with the already neutron-rich actinides) and would minimise the neutron deficiencies of the nuclides produced. Being doubly magic, it would confer benefits in stability to the fused nuclei. In collaboration with the team at the Lawrence Livermore National Laboratory (LLNL) in Livermore, California, United States, they made an attempt on element 114 (which was predicted to be a magic number, closing a proton shell, and more stable than element 113).

In 1998, the JINR–LLNL collaboration started their attempt on element 114, bombarding a target of plutonium-244 with ions of calcium-48:

^{244}_{94}Pu + ^{48}_{20}Ca → ^{292}114* → ^{290}114 + 2 n + e^{−} → ^{290}113 + ν_{e} ?

A single atom was observed which was thought to be the isotope ^{289}114: the results were published in January 1999. Despite numerous attempts to repeat this reaction, an isotope with these decay properties has never again been found, and the exact identity of this activity is unknown. A 2016 paper by Sigurd Hofmann et al. considered that the most likely explanation of the 1998 result is that two neutrons were emitted by the produced compound nucleus, leading to ^{290}114 and electron capture to ^{290}113, while more neutrons were emitted in all other produced chains. This would have been the first report of a decay chain from an isotope of element 113, but it was not recognised at the time, and the assignment is still uncertain. A similar long-lived activity observed by the JINR team in March 1999 in the ^{242}Pu + ^{48}Ca reaction may be due to the electron-capture daughter of ^{287}114, ^{287}113; this assignment is also tentative.

=== JINR–LLNL collaboration ===
The now-confirmed discovery of element 114 was made in June 1999 when the JINR team repeated the first ^{244}Pu + ^{48}Ca reaction from 1998; following this, the JINR team used the same hot fusion technique to synthesize elements 116 and 118 in 2000 and 2002 respectively via the ^{248}Cm + ^{48}Ca and ^{249}Cf + ^{48}Ca reactions. They then turned their attention to the missing odd-numbered elements, as the odd protons and possibly neutrons would hinder decay by spontaneous fission and result in longer decay chains.

The first report of element 113 was in August 2003, when it was identified as an alpha decay product of element 115. Element 115 had been produced by bombarding a target of americium-243 with calcium-48 projectiles. The JINR–LLNL collaboration published its results in February 2004:

^{243}_{95}Am + ^{48}_{20}Ca → ^{291}115* → ^{288}115 + 3 n → ^{284}113 + α
^{243}_{95}Am + ^{48}_{20}Ca → ^{291}115* → ^{287}115 + 4 n → ^{283}113 + α

Four further alpha decays were observed, ending with the spontaneous fission of isotopes of element 105, dubnium.

=== Riken ===
While the JINR–LLNL collaboration had been studying fusion reactions with ^{48}Ca, a team of Japanese scientists at the Riken Nishina Center for Accelerator-Based Science in Wakō, Japan, led by Kōsuke Morita had been studying cold fusion reactions. Morita had previously studied the synthesis of superheavy elements at the JINR before starting his own team at Riken. In 2001, his team confirmed the GSI's discoveries of elements 108, 110, 111, and 112. They then made a new attempt on element 113, using the same ^{209}Bi + ^{70}Zn reaction that the GSI had attempted unsuccessfully in 1998. Despite the much lower yield expected than for the JINR's hot fusion technique with calcium-48, the Riken team chose to use cold fusion as the synthesised isotopes would alpha decay to known daughter nuclides and make the discovery much more certain, and would not require the use of radioactive targets. In particular, the isotope ^{278}113 expected to be produced in this reaction would decay to the known ^{266}Bh, which had been synthesised in 2000 by a team at the Lawrence Berkeley National Laboratory (LBNL) in Berkeley.

The bombardment of ^{209}Bi with ^{70}Zn at Riken began in September 2003. The team detected a single atom of ^{278}113 in July 2004 and published their results that September:

^{209}_{83}Bi + ^{70}_{30}Zn → ^{279}113* → ^{278}113 + n

The Riken team observed four alpha decays from ^{278}113, creating a decay chain passing through ^{274}Rg, ^{270}Mt, and ^{266}Bh before terminating with the spontaneous fission of ^{262}Db. The decay data they observed for the alpha decay of ^{266}Bh matched the 2000 data, lending support for their claim. Spontaneous fission of its daughter ^{262}Db had not been previously known; the American team had observed only alpha decay from this nuclide.

=== Road to confirmation ===
When the discovery of a new element is claimed, the Joint Working Party (JWP) of the International Union of Pure and Applied Chemistry (IUPAC) and the International Union of Pure and Applied Physics (IUPAP) assembles to examine the claims according to their criteria for the discovery of a new element, and decides scientific priority and naming rights for the elements. According to the JWP criteria, a discovery must demonstrate that the element has an atomic number different from all previously observed values. It should also preferably be repeated by other laboratories, although this requirement has been waived where the data is of very high quality. Such a demonstration must establish properties, either physical or chemical, of the new element and establish that they are those of a previously unknown element. The main techniques used to demonstrate atomic number are cross-reactions (creating claimed nuclides as parents or daughters of other nuclides produced by a different reaction) and anchoring decay chains to known daughter nuclides. For the JWP, priority in confirmation takes precedence over the date of the original claim. Both teams set out to confirm their results by these methods.

Summary of decay chains passing through isotopes of element 113, ending at mendelevium (element 101) or earlier. The two chains with bold-bordered nuclides were accepted by the JWP as evidence for the discoveries of element 113 and its parents, elements 115 and 117. Data is presented as known in 2015 (before the JWP's conclusions were published).

==== 2004–2008 ====
In June 2004 and again in December 2005, the JINR–LLNL collaboration strengthened their claim for the discovery of element 113 by conducting chemical experiments on ^{268}Db, the final decay product of ^{288}115. This was valuable as none of the nuclides in this decay chain were previously known, so that their claim was not supported by any previous experimental data, and chemical experimentation would strengthen the case for their claim, since the chemistry of dubnium is known. ^{268}Db was successfully identified by extracting the final decay products, measuring spontaneous fission (SF) activities and using chemical identification techniques to confirm that they behave like a group 5 element (dubnium is known to be in group 5). Both the half-life and decay mode were confirmed for the proposed ^{268}Db which lends support to the assignment of the parent and daughter nuclei to elements 115 and 113 respectively. Further experiments at the JINR in 2005 confirmed the observed decay data.

In November and December 2004, the Riken team studied the ^{205}Tl + ^{70}Zn reaction, aiming the zinc beam onto a thallium rather than a bismuth target, in an effort to directly produce ^{274}Rg in a cross-bombardment as it is the immediate daughter of ^{278}113. The reaction was unsuccessful, as the thallium target was physically weak compared to the more commonly used lead and bismuth targets, and it deteriorated significantly and became non-uniform in thickness. The reasons for this weakness are unknown, given that thallium has a higher melting point than bismuth. The Riken team then repeated the original ^{209}Bi + ^{70}Zn reaction and produced a second atom of ^{278}113 in April 2005, with a decay chain that again terminated with the spontaneous fission of ^{262}Db. The decay data were slightly different from those of the first chain: this could have been because an alpha particle escaped from the detector without depositing its full energy, or because some of the intermediate decay products were formed in metastable isomeric states.

In 2006, a team at the Heavy Ion Research Facility in Lanzhou, China, investigated the ^{243}Am + ^{26}Mg reaction, producing four atoms of ^{266}Bh. All four chains started with an alpha decay to ^{262}Db; three chains ended there with spontaneous fission, as in the ^{278}113 chains observed at Riken, while the remaining one continued via another alpha decay to ^{258}Lr, as in the ^{266}Bh chains observed at LBNL.

In June 2006, the JINR–LLNL collaboration claimed to have synthesised a new isotope of element 113 directly by bombarding a neptunium-237 target with accelerated calcium-48 nuclei:

^{237}_{93}Np + ^{48}_{20}Ca → ^{285}113* → ^{282}113 + 3 n

Two atoms of ^{282}113 were detected. The aim of this experiment had been to synthesise the isotopes ^{281}113 and ^{282}113 that would fill in the gap between isotopes produced via hot fusion (^{283}113 and ^{284}113) and cold fusion (^{278}113). After five alpha decays, these nuclides would reach known isotopes of lawrencium, assuming that the decay chains were not terminated prematurely by spontaneous fission. The first decay chain ended in fission after four alpha decays, presumably originating from ^{266}Db or its electron-capture daughter ^{266}Rf. Spontaneous fission was not observed in the second chain even after four alpha decays. A fifth alpha decay in each chain could have been missed, since ^{266}Db can theoretically undergo alpha decay, in which case the first decay chain would have ended at the known ^{262}Lr or ^{262}No and the second might have continued to the known long-lived ^{258}Md, which has a half-life of 51.5 days, longer than the duration of the experiment: this would explain the lack of a spontaneous fission event in this chain. In the absence of direct detection of the long-lived alpha decays, these interpretations remain unconfirmed, and there is still no known link between any superheavy nuclides produced by hot fusion and the well-known main body of the chart of nuclides.

==== 2009–2015 ====
The JWP published its report on elements 113–116 and 118 in 2011. It recognised the JINR–LLNL collaboration as having discovered elements 114 and 116, but did not accept either team's claim to element 113 and did not accept the JINR–LLNL claims to elements 115 and 118. The JINR–LLNL claim to elements 115 and 113 had been founded on chemical identification of their daughter dubnium, but the JWP objected that current theory could not distinguish between superheavy group 4 and group 5 elements by their chemical properties with enough confidence to allow this assignment. The decay properties of all the nuclei in the decay chain of element 115 had not been previously characterised before the JINR experiments, a situation which the JWP generally considers "troublesome, but not necessarily exclusive", and with the small number of atoms produced with neither known daughters nor cross-reactions the JWP considered that their criteria had not been fulfilled. The JWP did not accept the Riken team's claim either due to inconsistencies in the decay data, the small number of atoms of element 113 produced, and the lack of unambiguous anchors to known isotopes.

In early 2009, the Riken team synthesised the decay product ^{266}Bh directly in the ^{248}Cm + ^{23}Na reaction to establish its link with ^{278}113 as a cross-bombardment. They also established the branched decay of ^{262}Db, which sometimes underwent spontaneous fission and sometimes underwent the previously known alpha decay to ^{258}Lr.

In late 2009, the JINR–LLNL collaboration studied the ^{249}Bk + ^{48}Ca reaction in an effort to produce element 117, which would decay to elements 115 and 113 and bolster their claims in a cross-reaction. They were now joined by scientists from Oak Ridge National Laboratory (ORNL) and Vanderbilt University, both in Tennessee, United States, who helped procure the rare and highly radioactive berkelium target necessary to complete the JINR's calcium-48 campaign to synthesise the heaviest elements on the periodic table. Two isotopes of element 117 were synthesised, decaying to element 115 and then element 113:

^{249}_{97}Bk + ^{48}_{20}Ca → ^{297}117* → ^{294}117 + 3 n → ^{290}115 + α → ^{286}113 + α
^{249}_{97}Bk + ^{48}_{20}Ca → ^{297}117* → ^{293}117 + 4 n → ^{289}115 + α → ^{285}113 + α

The new isotopes ^{285}113 and ^{286}113 produced did not overlap with the previously claimed ^{282}113, ^{283}113, and ^{284}113, so this reaction could not be used as a cross-bombardment to confirm the 2003 or 2006 claims.

In March 2010, the Riken team again attempted to synthesise ^{274}Rg directly through the ^{205}Tl + ^{70}Zn reaction with upgraded equipment; they failed again and abandoned this cross-bombardment route.

After 450 more days of irradiation of bismuth with zinc projectiles, Riken produced and identified another ^{278}113 atom in August 2012. Although electricity prices had soared since the 2011 Tōhoku earthquake and tsunami, and Riken had ordered the shutdown of the accelerator programs to save money, Morita's team was permitted to continue with one experiment, and they chose their attempt to confirm their synthesis of element 113. In this case, a series of six alpha decays was observed, leading to an isotope of mendelevium:

^{278}113 → ^{274}_{111}Rg + α → ^{270}_{109}Mt + α → ^{266}_{107}Bh + α → ^{262}_{105}Db + α → ^{258}_{103}Lr + α → ^{254}_{101}Md + α

This decay chain differed from the previous observations at Riken mainly in the decay mode of ^{262}Db, which was previously observed to undergo spontaneous fission, but in this case instead alpha decayed; the alpha decay of ^{262}Db to ^{258}Lr is well-known. The team calculated the probability of accidental coincidence to be 10^{−28}, or totally negligible. The resulting ^{254}Md atom then underwent electron capture to ^{254}Fm, which underwent the seventh alpha decay in the chain to the long-lived ^{250}Cf, which has a half-life of around thirteen years.

The ^{249}Bk + ^{48}Ca experiment was repeated at the JINR in 2012 and 2013 with consistent results, and again at the GSI in 2014. In August 2013, a team of researchers at Lund University in Lund, Sweden, and at the GSI announced that they had repeated the 2003 ^{243}Am + ^{48}Ca experiment, confirming the findings of the JINR–LLNL collaboration. The same year, the 2003 experiment had been repeated at the JINR, now also creating the isotope ^{289}115 that could serve as a cross-bombardment for confirming their discovery of the element 117 isotope ^{293}117, as well as its daughter ^{285}113 as part of its decay chain. Confirmation of ^{288}115 and its daughters was published by the team at the LBNL in August 2015.

=== Approval of discoveries ===
In December 2015, the conclusions of a new JWP report were published by IUPAC in a press release, in which element 113 was awarded to Riken; elements 115, 117, and 118 were awarded to the collaborations involving the JINR. A joint 2016 announcement by IUPAC and IUPAP had been scheduled to coincide with the publication of the JWP reports, but IUPAC alone decided on an early release because the news of Riken being awarded credit for element 113 had been leaked to Japanese newspapers. For the first time in history, a team of Asian physicists would name a new element. The JINR considered the awarding of element 113 to Riken unexpected, citing their own 2003 production of elements 115 and 113, and pointing to the precedents of elements 103, 104, and 105 where IUPAC had awarded joint credit to the JINR and LBNL. They stated that they respected IUPAC's decision, but reserved determination of their position for the official publication of the JWP reports.

The full JWP reports were published on 21 January 2016. The JWP recognised the discovery of element 113, assigning priority to Riken. They noted that while the individual decay energies of each nuclide in the decay chain of ^{278}113 were inconsistent, their sum was now confirmed to be consistent, strongly suggesting that the initial and final states in ^{278}113 and its daughter ^{262}Db were the same for all three events. The decay of ^{262}Db to ^{258}Lr and ^{254}Md was previously known, firmly anchoring the decay chain of ^{278}113 to known regions of the chart of nuclides. The JWP considered that the JINR–LLNL collaborations of 2004 and 2007, producing element 113 as the daughter of element 115, did not meet the discovery criteria as they had not convincingly determined the atomic numbers of their nuclides through cross-bombardments, which were considered necessary since their decay chains were not anchored to previously known nuclides. They also considered that the previous JWP's concerns over their chemical identification of the dubnium daughter had not been adequately addressed. The JWP recognised the JINR–LLNL–ORNL–Vanderbilt collaboration of 2010 as having discovered elements 117 and 115, and accepted that element 113 had been produced as their daughter, but did not give this work shared credit.

After the publication of the JWP reports, Sergey Dimitriev, the lab director of the Flerov lab at the JINR where the discoveries were made, remarked that he was happy with IUPAC's decision, mentioning the time Riken spent on their experiment and their good relations with Morita, who had learnt the basics of synthesising superheavy elements at the JINR.

The sum argument advanced by the JWP in the approval of the discovery of element 113 was later criticised in a May 2016 study from Lund University and the GSI, as it is only valid if no gamma decay or internal conversion takes place along the decay chain, which is not likely for odd nuclei, and the uncertainty of the alpha decay energies measured in the ^{278}113 decay chain was not small enough to rule out this possibility. If this is the case, similarity in lifetimes of intermediate daughters becomes a meaningless argument, as different isomers of the same nuclide can have different half-lives: for example, the ground state of ^{180}Ta has a half-life of hours, but an excited state ^{180m}Ta has never been observed to decay. This study found reason to doubt and criticise the IUPAC approval of the discoveries of elements 115 and 117, but the data from Riken for element 113 was found to be congruent, and the data from the JINR team for elements 115 and 113 to probably be so, thus endorsing the IUPAC approval of the discovery of element 113. Two members of the JINR team published a journal article rebutting these criticisms against the congruence of their data on elements 113, 115, and 117 in June 2017.

=== Naming ===
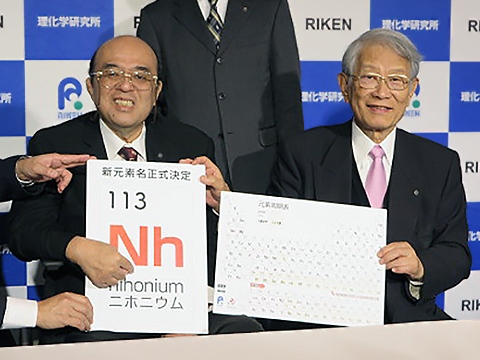
Kōsuke Morita and Hiroshi Matsumoto, celebrating the naming on 1 December 2016.

Using Mendeleev's nomenclature for unnamed and undiscovered elements, nihonium would be known as eka-thallium. In 1979, IUPAC published recommendations according to which the element was to be called ununtrium (with the corresponding symbol of Uut), a systematic element name as a placeholder, until the discovery of the element is confirmed and a name is decided on. The recommendations were widely used in the chemical community on all levels, from chemistry classrooms to advanced textbooks, but were mostly ignored among scientists in the field, who called it "element 113", with the symbol of E113, (113), or even simply 113.

Before the JWP recognition of their priority, the Japanese team had unofficially suggested various names: japonium, after their home country; nishinanium, after Japanese physicist Yoshio Nishina, the "founding father of modern physics research in Japan"; and rikenium, after the institute. After the recognition, the Riken team gathered in February 2016 to decide on a name. Morita expressed his desire for the name to honour the fact that element 113 had been discovered in Japan. Japonium was considered, making the connection to Japan easy to identify for non-Japanese, but it was rejected as Jap is considered an ethnic slur. The name nihonium was chosen after an hour of deliberation: it comes from Nihon (日本), one of the two Japanese pronunciations for the name of Japan. The discoverers also intended to reference the support of their research by the Japanese people (Riken being almost entirely government-funded), recover lost pride and trust in science among those who were affected by the Fukushima Daiichi nuclear disaster, and honour Japanese chemist Masataka Ogawa's 1908 discovery of rhenium, which he named "nipponium" with symbol Np after the other Japanese pronunciation of Japan's name. As Ogawa's claim had not been accepted, the name "nipponium" could not be reused for a new element, and its symbol Np had since been used for neptunium. (Note: Neptunium had been first reported at Riken by Nishina and Kenjiro Kimura in 1940, who did not get naming rights because they could not chemically separate and identify their discovery.) In March 2016, Morita proposed the name "nihonium" to IUPAC, with the symbol Nh. The naming realised what had been a national dream in Japanese science ever since Ogawa's claim.

The former president of IUPAP, Cecilia Jarlskog, complained at the Nobel Symposium on Superheavy Elements in Bäckaskog Castle, Sweden, in June 2016 about the lack of openness involved in the process of approving new elements, and stated that she believed that the JWP's work was flawed and should be redone by a new JWP. A survey of physicists determined that many felt that the Lund–GSI 2016 criticisms of the JWP report were well-founded, but it was also generally thought that the conclusions would hold up if the work was redone. Thus the new president, Bruce McKellar, ruled that the proposed names should be released in a joint IUPAP–IUPAC press release. IUPAC and IUPAP publicised the proposal of nihonium that June, and set a five-month term to collect comments, after which the name would be formally established at a conference. The name was officially approved on 28 November 2016. The naming ceremony for the new element was held in Tokyo, Japan, on 14 March 2017, with Naruhito, then the Crown Prince of Japan, in attendance.

== Isotopes ==
List of nihonium isotopes
Isotope	Half-life (Note: Different sources give different values for half-lives; the most recently published values are listed.)		Decay mode	Discovery year	Discovery reaction
Isotope	Value	ref	Decay mode	Discovery year	Discovery reaction
^{278}Nh	2.0 ms		α	2004	^{209}Bi(^{70}Zn,n)
^{282}Nh	61 ms		α	2007	^{237}Np(^{48}Ca,3n)
^{283}Nh	123 ms		α	2004	^{287}Mc(—,α)
^{284}Nh	0.90 s		α, EC	2004	^{288}Mc(—,α)
^{285}Nh	2.1 s		α, SF	2010	^{289}Mc(—,α)
^{286}Nh	9.5 s		α	2010	^{290}Mc(—,α)
^{287}Nh (Note: This isotope is unconfirmed)	5.5 s		α	(2017)	^{287}Fl(e^{−},ν_{e})
^{290}Nh	2 s		α	(2016)	^{290}Fl(e^{−},ν_{e})

Nihonium has no stable or naturally occurring isotopes. Several radioactive isotopes have been synthesised in the laboratory, either by fusing two atoms or by observing the decay of heavier elements. Eight different isotopes of nihonium have been reported with atomic masses 278, 282–287, and 290 (^{287}Nh and ^{290}Nh are unconfirmed); they all decay through alpha decay to isotopes of roentgenium. There have been indications that nihonium-284 can also decay by electron capture to copernicium-284, though estimates of the partial half-life for this branch vary strongly by model. A spontaneous fission branch of nihonium-285 has also been reported.

=== Stability and half-lives ===
A chart of heavy nuclides with their known and predicted half-lives (known nuclides shown with borders). Nihonium (row 113) is expected to be within the "island of stability" (white circle) and thus its nuclei are slightly more stable than would otherwise be predicted; the known nihonium isotopes are too neutron-poor to be within the island.

The stability of nuclei quickly decreases with the increase in atomic number after curium, element 96, whose half-life is over ten thousand times longer than that of any subsequent element. All isotopes with an atomic number above 101 undergo radioactive decay with half-lives of less than 30 hours: this is because of the ever-increasing Coulomb repulsion of protons, so that the strong nuclear force cannot hold the nucleus together against spontaneous fission for long. Calculations suggest that in the absence of other stabilising factors, elements with more than 103 protons should not exist. Researchers in the 1960s suggested that the closed nuclear shells around 114 protons and 184 neutrons should counteract this instability, and create an "island of stability" containing nuclides with half-lives reaching thousands or millions of years. The existence of the island is still unproven, but the existence of the superheavy elements (including nihonium) confirms that the stabilising effect is real, and in general the known superheavy nuclides become longer-lived as they approach the predicted location of the island.

All nihonium isotopes are unstable and radioactive; the heavier nihonium isotopes are more stable than the lighter ones, as they are closer to the centre of the island. The most stable known nihonium isotope, ^{286}Nh, is also the heaviest; it has a half-life of 8 seconds. The isotope ^{285}Nh, as well as the unconfirmed ^{287}Nh and ^{290}Nh, have also been reported to have half-lives of over a second. The isotopes ^{284}Nh and ^{283}Nh have half-lives of 0.90 and 0.12 seconds respectively. The remaining two isotopes have half-lives between 0.1 and 100 milliseconds: ^{282}Nh has a half-life of 61 milliseconds, and ^{278}Nh, the lightest known nihonium isotope, is also the shortest-lived, with a half-life of 2.0 milliseconds. This rapid increase in the half-lives near the closed neutron shell at N = 184 is seen in roentgenium, copernicium, and nihonium (elements 111 through 113), where each extra neutron so far multiplies the half-life by a factor of 5 to 20.

The unknown isotopes in the gap between ^{278}Nh and ^{282}Nh are too heavy to be produced by cold fusion and too light to be produced by hot fusion. The missing ^{280}Nh and ^{281}Nh may be populated as daughters of ^{284}Mc and ^{285}Mc, producible in the ^{241}Am+^{48}Ca reaction, but this has not yet been attempted. Of particular interest is ^{281}Nh, as it is the expected great-granddaughter of ^{293}119, a possible product of the ^{243}Am+^{54}Cr reaction. Production of ^{282}Mc and ^{283}Mc is possible in the ^{243}Am+^{44}Ca reaction (though it has a lower cross-section), and their daughters would be ^{278}Nh (known) and ^{279}Nh. The heavier isotopes ^{287}Nh through ^{290}Nh might be synthesised using charged-particle evaporation, using the ^{242}Pu+^{48}Ca and ^{244}Pu+^{48}Ca reactions where one proton and some neutrons are evaporated.

== Predicted properties ==
Very few properties of nihonium or its compounds have been measured; this is due to its extremely limited and expensive production and the fact it decays very quickly. Properties of nihonium mostly remain unknown and only predictions are available.

=== Physical and atomic ===
Atomic energy levels of outermost s, p, and d electrons of thallium and nihonium

Nihonium is the first member of the 7p series of elements and the heaviest group 13 element on the periodic table, below boron, aluminium, gallium, indium, and thallium. All the group 13 elements except boron are metals, and nihonium is expected to follow suit. Nihonium is predicted to show many differences from its lighter homologues. The major reason for this is the spin–orbit (SO) interaction, which is especially strong for the superheavy elements, because their electrons move much faster than in lighter atoms, at velocities close to the speed of light. In relation to nihonium atoms, it lowers the 7s and the 7p electron energy levels (stabilising those electrons), but two of the 7p electron energy levels are stabilised more than the other four. The stabilisation of the 7s electrons is called the inert pair effect, and the separation of the 7p subshell into the more and less stabilised parts is called subshell splitting. Computational chemists see the split as a change of the second, azimuthal quantum number l, from 1 to 1/2 and 3/2 for the more and less stabilised parts of the 7p subshell, respectively. The quantum number corresponds to the letter in the electron orbital name: 0 to s, 1 to p, 2 to d, etc. For theoretical purposes, the valence electron configuration may be represented to reflect the 7p subshell split as 7s^{2} 7p_{1/2}^{1}. The first ionisation energy of nihonium is expected to be 7.306 eV, the highest among the metals of group 13. Similar subshell splitting should exist for the 6d electron levels, with four being 6d_{3/2} and six being 6d_{5/2}. Both these levels are raised to be close in energy to the 7s ones, high enough to possibly be chemically active. This would allow for the possibility of exotic nihonium compounds without lighter group 13 analogues.

Periodic trends would predict nihonium to have an atomic radius larger than that of thallium due to it being one period further down the periodic table, but calculations suggest nihonium has an atomic radius of about 170 pm, the same as that of thallium, due to the relativistic stabilisation and contraction of its 7s and 7p_{1/2} orbitals. Thus, nihonium is expected to be much denser than thallium, with a predicted density of about 16 to 18 g/cm^{3} compared to thallium's 11.85 g/cm^{3}, since nihonium atoms are heavier than thallium atoms but have the same volume. Bulk nihonium is expected to have a hexagonal close-packed crystal structure, like thallium. The melting and boiling points of nihonium have been predicted to be 430 °C and 1100 °C respectively, exceeding the values for indium and thallium, following periodic trends. Nihonium should have a bulk modulus of 20.8 GPa, about half that of thallium (43 GPa).

=== Chemical ===
The chemistry of nihonium is expected to be very different from that of thallium. This difference stems from the spin–orbit splitting of the 7p shell, which results in nihonium being between two relatively inert closed-shell elements (copernicium and flerovium). Nihonium is expected to be less reactive than thallium, because of the greater stabilisation and resultant chemical inactivity of the 7s subshell in nihonium compared to the 6s subshell in thallium. The standard electrode potential for the Nh^{+}/Nh couple is predicted to be 0.6 V. Nihonium should be a rather noble metal.

The metallic group 13 elements are typically found in two oxidation states: +1 and +3. The former results from the involvement of only the single p electron in bonding, and the latter results in the involvement of all three valence electrons, two in the s-subshell and one in the p-subshell. Going down the group, bond energies decrease and the +3 state becomes less stable, as the energy released in forming two additional bonds and attaining the +3 state is not always enough to outweigh the energy needed to involve the s-electrons. Hence, for aluminium and gallium +3 is the most stable state, but +1 gains importance for indium and by thallium it becomes more stable than the +3 state. Nihonium is expected to continue this trend and have +1 as its most stable oxidation state.

The simplest possible nihonium compound is the monohydride, NhH. The bonding is provided by the 7p_{1/2} electron of nihonium and the 1s electron of hydrogen. The SO interaction causes the binding energy of nihonium monohydride to be reduced by about 1 eV and the nihonium–hydrogen bond length to decrease as the bonding 7p_{1/2} orbital is relativistically contracted. This is unique among the 7p element monohydrides; all the others have relativistic expansion of the bond length instead of contraction. Another effect of the SO interaction is that the Nh–H bond is expected to have significant pi bonding character (side-on orbital overlap), unlike the almost pure sigma bonding (head-on orbital overlap) in thallium monohydride (TlH). The analogous monofluoride (NhF) should also exist. Nihonium(I) is predicted to be more similar to silver(I) than thallium(I): the Nh^{+} ion is expected to more willingly bind anions, so that NhCl should be quite soluble in excess hydrochloric acid or ammonia; TlCl is not. In contrast to Tl^{+}, which forms the strongly basic hydroxide (TlOH) in solution, the Nh^{+} cation should instead hydrolyse all the way to the amphoteric oxide Nh_{2}O, which would be soluble in aqueous ammonia and weakly soluble in water.

The adsorption behaviour of nihonium on gold surfaces in thermochromatographical experiments is expected to be closer to that of astatine than that of thallium. The destabilisation of the 7p_{3/2} subshell effectively leads to a valence shell closing at the 7s^{2} 7p^{2} configuration rather than the expected 7s^{2} 7p^{6} configuration with its stable octet. As such, nihonium, like astatine, can be considered to be one p-electron short of a closed valence shell. Hence, even though nihonium is in group 13, it has several properties similar to the group 17 elements. (Tennessine in group 17 has some group-13-like properties, as it has three valence electrons outside the 7s^{2} 7p^{2} closed shell.) Nihonium is expected to be able to gain an electron to attain this closed-shell configuration, forming the −1 oxidation state like the halogens (fluorine, chlorine, bromine, iodine, and astatine). This state should be more stable than it is for thallium as the SO splitting of the 7p subshell is greater than that for the 6p subshell. Nihonium should be the most electronegative of the metallic group 13 elements, even more electronegative than tennessine, the period 7 congener of the halogens: in the compound NhTs, the negative charge is expected to be on the nihonium atom rather than the tennessine atom. The −1 oxidation should be more stable for nihonium than for tennessine. The electron affinity of nihonium is calculated to be around 0.68 eV, higher than thallium's at 0.4 eV; tennessine's is expected to be 1.8 eV, the lowest in its group. It is theoretically predicted that nihonium should have an enthalpy of sublimation around 150 kJ/mol and an enthalpy of adsorption on a gold surface around −159 kJ/mol.

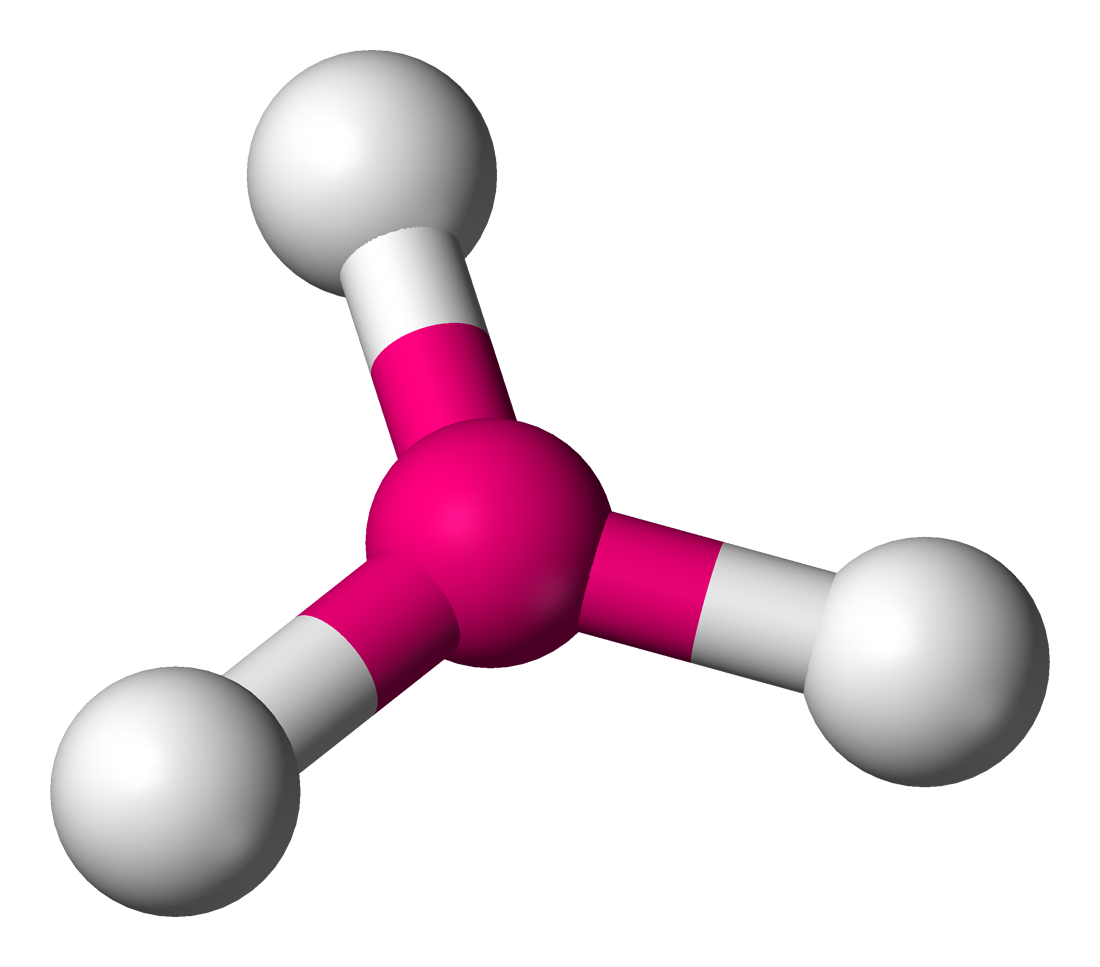
BCl_{3} has a trigonal structure.

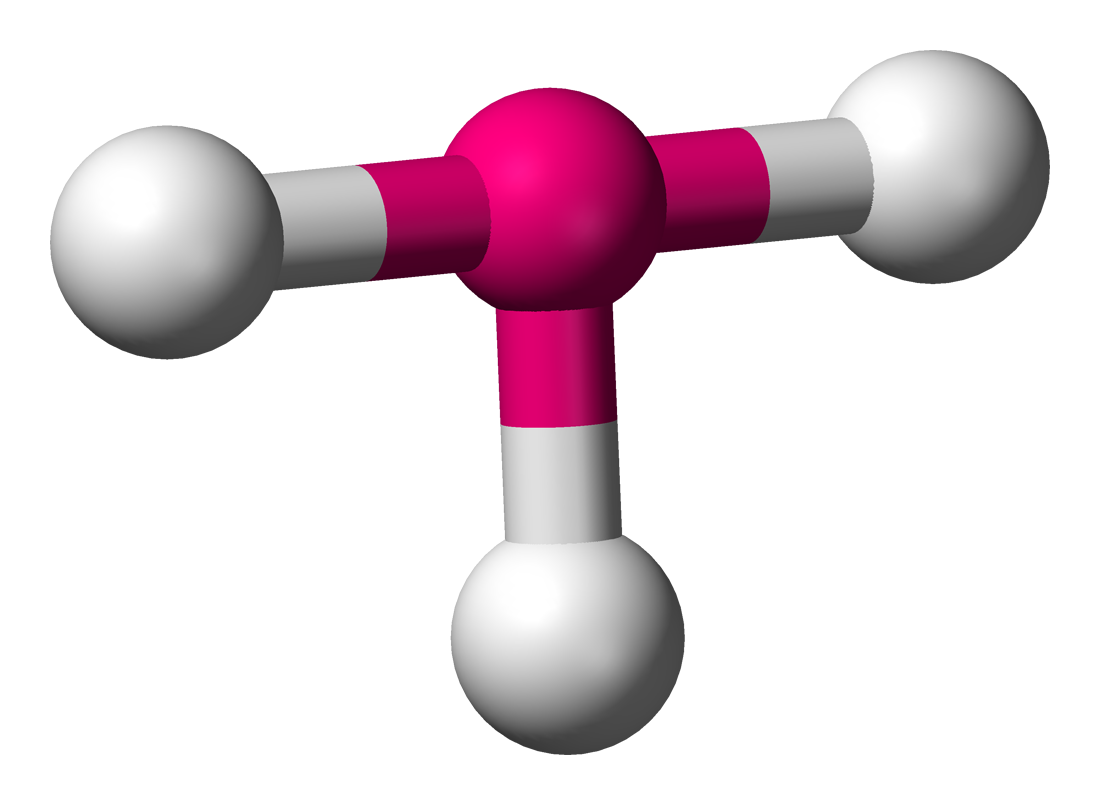
NhCl_{3} is predicted to be T-shaped.

Significant 6d involvement is expected in the Nh–Au bond, although it is expected to be more unstable than the Tl–Au bond and entirely due to magnetic interactions. This raises the possibility of some transition metal character for nihonium. On the basis of the small energy gap between the 6d and 7s electrons, the higher oxidation states +3 and +5 have been suggested for nihonium. Some simple compounds with nihonium in the +3 oxidation state would be the trihydride (NhH_{3}), trifluoride (NhF_{3}), and trichloride (NhCl_{3}). These molecules are predicted to be T-shaped and not trigonal planar as their boron analogues are: (Note: Among the stable group 13 elements, only boron forms monomeric halides at standard conditions; those of aluminium, gallium, indium, and thallium form ionic lattice structures or (in a few cases) dimerise.) this is due to the influence of the 6d_{5/2} electrons on the bonding. (Note: The opposite effect is expected for the superheavy member of group 17, tennessine, due to the relativistic stabilisation of the 7p_{1/2} orbital: thus IF_{3} is T-shaped, but TsF_{3} is expected to be trigonal planar.) The heavier nihonium tribromide (NhBr_{3}) and triiodide (NhI_{3}) are trigonal planar due to the increased steric repulsion between the peripheral atoms; accordingly, they do not show significant 6d involvement in their bonding, though the large 7s–7p energy gap means that they show reduced sp^{2} hybridisation compared to their boron analogues.

The bonding in the lighter NhX_{3} molecules can be considered as that of a linear NhX^{+}_{2} species (similar to HgF_{2} or AuF^{−}_{2}) with an additional Nh–X bond involving the 7p orbital of nihonium perpendicular to the other two ligands. These compounds are all expected to be highly unstable towards the loss of an X_{2} molecule and reduction to nihonium(I):

NhX_{3} → NhX + X_{2}

Nihonium thus continues the trend down group 13 of reduced stability of the +3 oxidation state, as all five of these compounds have lower reaction energies than the unknown thallium(III) iodide. (Note: The compound with stoichiometry TlI_{3} is a thallium(I) compound involving the triiodide anion, I^{−}_{3}.) The +3 state is stabilised for thallium in anionic complexes such as TlI^{−}_{4}, and the presence of a possible vacant coordination site on the lighter T-shaped nihonium trihalides is expected to allow a similar stabilisation of NhF^{−}_{4} and perhaps NhCl^{−}_{4}.

The +5 oxidation state is unknown for all lighter group 13 elements: calculations predict that nihonium pentahydride (NhH_{5}) and pentafluoride (NhF_{5}) should have a square pyramidal molecular geometry, but also that both would be highly thermodynamically unstable to loss of an X_{2} molecule and reduction to nihonium(III). Again, some stabilisation is expected for anionic complexes, such as NhF^{−}_{6}. The structures of the nihonium trifluoride and pentafluoride molecules are the same as those for chlorine trifluoride and pentafluoride.

== Experimental chemistry ==
The isotopes ^{284}Nh, ^{285}Nh, and ^{286}Nh have half-lives long enough for chemical investigation. From 2010 to 2012, some preliminary chemical experiments were performed at the JINR to determine the volatility of nihonium. The isotope ^{284}Nh was investigated, made as the daughter of ^{288}Mc produced in the ^{243}Am+^{48}Ca reaction. The nihonium atoms were synthesised in a recoil chamber and then carried along polytetrafluoroethylene (PTFE) capillaries at 70 °C by a carrier gas to the gold-covered detectors. About ten to twenty atoms of ^{284}Nh were produced, but none of these atoms were registered by the detectors, suggesting either that nihonium was similar in volatility to the noble gases (and thus diffused away too quickly to be detected) or, more plausibly, that pure nihonium was not very volatile and thus could not efficiently pass through the PTFE capillaries. Formation of the hydroxide NhOH should ease the transport, as nihonium hydroxide is expected to be more volatile than elemental nihonium, and this reaction could be facilitated by adding more water vapour into the carrier gas. It seems likely that this formation is not kinetically favoured, so the longer-lived isotopes ^{285}Nh and ^{286}Nh were considered more desirable for future experiments.

A 2017 experiment at the JINR, producing ^{284}Nh and ^{285}Nh via the ^{243}Am+^{48}Ca reaction as the daughters of ^{288}Mc and ^{289}Mc, avoided this problem by removing the quartz surface, using only PTFE. No nihonium atoms were observed after chemical separation, implying an unexpectedly large retention of nihonium atoms on PTFE surfaces. This experimental result for the interaction limit of nihonium atoms with a PTFE surface (−ΔH^{PTFE}_{ads}(Nh) > 45 kJ/mol) disagrees significantly with previous theory, which expected a lower value of 14.00 kJ/mol. This suggests that the nihonium species involved in the previous experiment was likely not elemental nihonium but rather nihonium hydroxide, and that high-temperature techniques such as vacuum chromatography would be necessary to further probe the behaviour of elemental nihonium. Bromine saturated with boron tribromide has been suggested as a carrier gas for experiments on nihonium chemistry; this oxidises nihonium's lighter congener thallium to thallium(III), providing an avenue to investigate the oxidation states of nihonium, similar to earlier experiments done on the bromides of group 5 elements, including the superheavy dubnium.

A 2024 experiment at the GSI, producing ^{284}Nh via the ^{243}Am+^{48}Ca reaction as daughter of ^{288}Mc, studied the adsorption of nihonium and moscovium on SiO_{2} and gold surfaces. The adsorption enthalpy of nihonium on SiO_{2} was determined experimentally as −ΔH^{SiO_{2}}_{ads}(Nh) = 58^{+8}_{−3} kJ/mol (68% confidence interval). Nihonium was determined to be less reactive with the SiO_{2} surface than its lighter congener thallium, but more reactive than its closed-shell neighbours copernicium and flerovium. This arises because of the relativistic stabilisation of the 7p_{1/2} shell.

== Bibliography ==
- Audi, G.; Kondev, F. G.; Wang, M.; et al. (2017). "The NUBASE2016 evaluation of nuclear properties". Chinese Physics C. 41 (3) 030001. Bibcode:2017ChPhC..41c0001A. doi:10.1088/1674-1137/41/3/030001.
- Beiser, A. (2003). Concepts of modern physics (6th ed.). McGraw-Hill. ISBN 978-0-07-244848-1. OCLC 48965418.
- Hoffman, D. C.; Ghiorso, A.; Seaborg, G. T. (2000). The Transuranium People: The Inside Story. World Scientific. ISBN 978-1-78-326244-1.
- Kragh, H. (2018). From Transuranic to Superheavy Elements: A Story of Dispute and Creation. Springer. ISBN 978-3-319-75813-8.
- Zagrebaev, V.; Karpov, A.; Greiner, W. (2013). "Future of superheavy element research: Which nuclei could be synthesized within the next few years?". Journal of Physics: Conference Series. 420 (1) 012001. arXiv:1207.5700. Bibcode:2013JPhCS.420a2001Z. doi:10.1088/1742-6596/420/1/012001. ISSN 1742-6588. S2CID 55434734.
