= Kōsuke Morita =

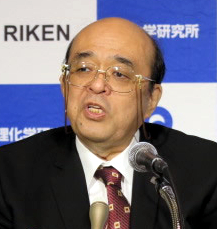
- Kōsuke Morita, professor of the faculty of science, Kyushu University, attending the press conference for the official announcement of nihonium in Fukuoka City, Fukuoka Prefecture, on December 1, 2016
- Born: January 23, 1957 (age 69); Kitakyushu, Fukuoka, Japan
- Education: Kyushu University
- Occupation: Experimental nuclear physicist
- Employer(s): Kyushu University; Riken
- Known for: Discovery of element 113

Kōsuke Morita (Japanese: 森田 浩介 Hepburn: Morita Kōsukee, born January 23, 1957) is a Japanese experimental nuclear physicist, known as the leader of the Japanese team that discovered nihonium (element 113). He currently holds a joint appointment as a professor at Kyushu University’s Graduate School of Science and as director of the Super Heavy Element Research Group at Riken's Nishina Center for Accelerator-Based Science.

== Professional life ==
Kōsuke Morita is a Japanese physicist specializing in experimental nuclear physics. He was born in 1957 in the city of Kitakyushu (北九州), located in the prefecture of Fukuoka. In 1979 he graduated from Kyushu University, where he would continue pursuing graduate studies. In 1984, he left Kyushu University after completing the doctoral program without receiving a degree. In an interview, Morita was asked why he left without finishing his PhD thesis. He responded, “The reason was simple: I did not have the talent to finish it". However, he returned to Kyushu University to complete his thesis in 1993, 9 years after beginning graduate studies.

After leaving Kyushu University in 1984 Morita joined Riken as a postdoctoral researcher, later on becoming a junior research scientist at Riken's cyclotron Laboratory. In 1991, he was promoted to research scientist and in 1993 to senior research scientist. In 2006, he was appointed chief scientist of the Superheavy Element Laboratory at Riken's Nishina Center.

Morita is currently a professor in the faculty of science at Kyushu University, where he has remained since his appointment in 2013. Additionally, he holds a position as the director of the Superheavy Element Production Team at Riken's Nishina Center for Accelerator-Based Science

== Research achievements ==
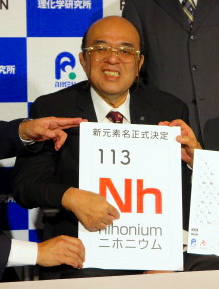
Morita at the press conference where the name Nihonium (symbol Nh) was officially announced for element 113 (December 1, 2016)

=== Synthesis of nihonium ===
Element 113 was first synthesized in 2004 by the Superheavy Element Production Team at Riken, under direction of Kōsuke Morita. The element was synthesized using a cold fusion approach, making it the heaviest element discovered using this production method. Synthesis of element 113 was accomplished by bombardment of a ^{209}Bi target with ^{70}Zn projectiles using a beam energy of 352.6 MeV. The experiment concluded with the synthesis of the ^{278}113 isotope of element 113.

Morita's team successfully synthesized element 113 in a total of three occasions: July 2004, April 2005, and August 2012. This achievement was officially recognized by the International Union of Pure and Applied Chemistry on December 31, 2015, granting Morita's team the element's naming rights. The name Nihonium was proposed, making reference to Japan's name (Japanese: 日本 Hepburn: Nihon). After a five-month public comment period, the union announced its formal approval on November 30, 2016. Nihonium is currently the only element to have been discovered by an Asian team.

The team currently aims to discover element 119, whose provisional name is ununennium.

== Work and education ==
- 1972 – Graduates from Beppu Municipal Central Junior High School (別府市中部中学校).
- 1975 – Graduates from Beppu Tsurumi Hill High School (別府鶴見丘高等学校) in Oita prefecture (大分県立).
- 1984 – Graduates from Kyushu University School of Physics.
- 1984 – Postdoctoral Researcher, Riken Cyclotron Laboratory.
- 1991 – Research Scientist, Riken Cyclotron Laboratory 1993 – Receives his PhD from Kyushu University.
- 1993 – Senior Research Scientist, Riken Cyclotron Laboratory 2004 – First synthesis of element 113 at Riken.
- 2006 – Chief Scientist and Director, Superheavy Element Laboratory, Nishina Center for Accelerator Research, Riken.
- 2013 – Professor, Kyushu University Graduate School of Science, Institute for Experimental Nuclear Physics

== Awards ==
- 2005 – The GSI Exotic Nuclei Community Membership Award.
- 2005 – Nishina Memorial Prize (仁科記念賞).
- 2005 – Inoue Science Award (井上学術賞).
- 2006 – 11th Paper Award of the Physical Society of Japan (JPS) (Joint Award).
- 2012 – Nice Step Scientist (ナイスステップな科学者).
- 2016 – Japan Academy Prize ( 日本学士院賞).
- 2017 - Asahi Prize (朝日賞).
- 2017 - Asian Scientist 100, Asian Scientist
