= Synthetic element =

Chemical elements that do not occur naturally

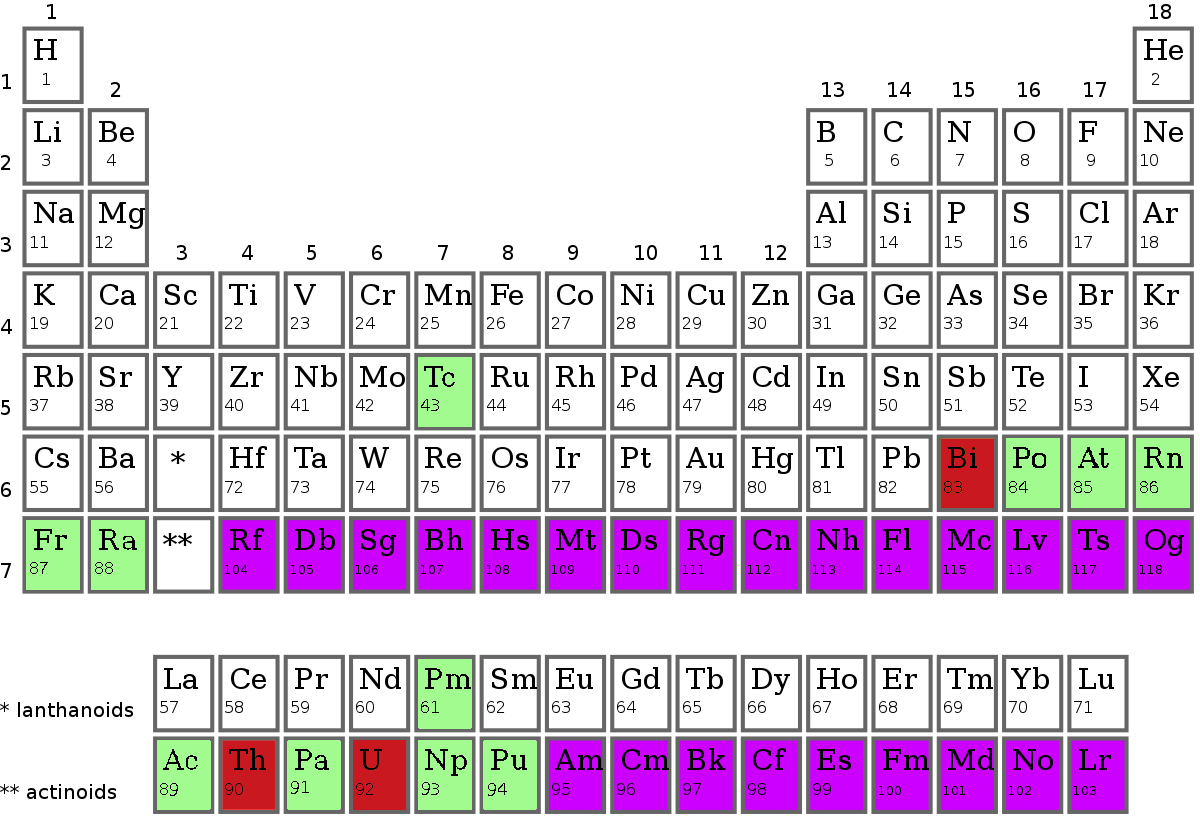
Synthetic elements Rare radioactive natural elements; often produced artificially Common radioactive natural elements

A synthetic element is a known chemical element that does not occur naturally on Earth: it has been created by human manipulation of fundamental particles in a nuclear reactor, a particle accelerator, or the explosion of an atomic bomb; thus, it is called "synthetic", "artificial", or "man-made". The synthetic elements are those with atomic numbers 95–118, as shown in purple on the accompanying periodic table: these 24 elements were first created between 1944 and 2010. The mechanism for the creation of a synthetic element is to force additional protons into the nucleus of an element with an atomic number lower than 95. All known (see: Island of stability) synthetic elements are unstable, but they decay at widely varying rates; the half-lives of their longest-lived isotopes range from microseconds to millions of years.

Six more elements that were first created artificially are strictly speaking not synthetic because they were later found in nature in trace quantities: technetium (_{43}Tc), promethium (_{61}Pm), astatine (_{85}At), neptunium (_{93}Np), plutonium (_{94}Pu), and curium (_{96}Cm); although they are sometimes classified as synthetic alongside exclusively artificial elements. The first, technetium, was created in 1937. Plutonium, first synthesized in 1940, is another such element. It is the element with the largest number of protons (atomic number) to occur in nature, but it does so in such tiny quantities that it is far more practical to synthesize it. Plutonium is known mainly for its use in atomic bombs and nuclear reactors.

No elements with atomic numbers greater than 99 have any uses outside of scientific research, since they have extremely short half-lives, and thus have never been produced in large quantities.

== Properties ==
All elements with atomic number greater than 94 decay quickly enough into lighter elements such that any atoms of these that may have existed when the Earth formed (about 4.6 billion years ago) have long since decayed. Synthetic elements now present on Earth are the product of atomic bombs or experiments that involve nuclear reactors or particle accelerators, via nuclear fusion or neutron absorption.

Atomic mass for natural elements is based on weighted average abundance of natural isotopes in Earth's crust and atmosphere. For synthetic elements, there is no "natural isotope abundance". Therefore, for synthetic elements the total nucleon count (protons plus neutrons) of the most stable isotope, i.e., the isotope with the longest half-life—is listed in brackets as the atomic mass.

=== Half-lifes ===
The list below shows half-life most time first for some of the elements' most stable isotopes:

- (Cm, Z=96): Curium-247, 1.64 × 10^{7} years / 1.56 × 10^{7} years
- (Am, Z=95): Americium-243; 7,370 years
- (Bk, Z=97): Berkelium-247; 1.4 × 10^{3} years / 1380 years
- (Cf, Z=98): Californium-251; 898 years
- (Es, Z=99): Einsteinium-252; 471.7 days
- (Fm, Z=100): Fermium-257; 100.5 days
- (Md, Z=101): Mendelevium-258; 51.5 days
- (Lr, Z=103): Lawrencium-262; 3.6 hours = 216 minutes
- (No, Z=102): Nobelium-259; 58 minutes
- (Rf, Z=104): Rutherfordium-263; approximately 10 minutes
- (Sg, Z=106): Seaborgium-269; 5 ± 2 minutes
- (Bh, Z=107): Bohrium-270; approximately 61 seconds

== History ==
=== Technetium ===
The first element to be synthesized, rather than discovered in nature, was technetium in 1937. This discovery filled a gap in the periodic table, and the fact that technetium has no stable isotopes explains its natural absence on Earth (and the gap). With the longest-lived isotope of technetium, ^{97}Tc, having a 4.21-million-year half-life, no technetium remains from the formation of the Earth. Only minute traces of technetium occur naturally in Earth's crust—as a product of spontaneous fission of ^{238}U, or from neutron capture in molybdenum—but technetium is present naturally in red giant stars.

=== Curium ===
The first entirely synthetic element to be made was curium, synthesized in 1944 by Glenn T. Seaborg, Ralph A. James, and Albert Ghiorso by bombarding plutonium with alpha particles. While all isotopes of Cm have geologically short-lives, nearby astrophysical sites of r-process nucleosynthesis have deposited Cm on Earth; first detected in 2026.

=== Eight others ===
Synthesis of americium, berkelium, and californium followed soon. Einsteinium and fermium were discovered by a team of scientists led by Albert Ghiorso in 1952 while studying the composition of radioactive debris from the detonation of the first hydrogen bomb. The isotopes synthesized were einsteinium-253, with a half-life of 20.5 days, and fermium-255, with a half-life of about 20 hours. The creation of mendelevium, nobelium, and lawrencium followed.

=== Rutherfordium and dubnium ===
During the height of the Cold War, teams from the Soviet Union and the United States independently created rutherfordium and dubnium. The naming and credit for synthesis of these elements remained unresolved for many years, but eventually, shared credit was recognized by IUPAC/IUPAP in 1992. In 1997, IUPAC decided to give dubnium its current name, honoring the city of Dubna where the Russian team worked since American-chosen names had already been used for many existing synthetic elements, while the name rutherfordium (chosen by the American team) was accepted for element 104.

=== The last thirteen ===
Meanwhile, the American team had created seaborgium, and the next six elements had been created by a German team: bohrium, hassium, meitnerium, darmstadtium, roentgenium, and copernicium. Element 113, nihonium, was created by a Japanese team; the last five known elements, flerovium, moscovium, livermorium, tennessine, and oganesson, were created by Russian–American collaborations and complete the seventh row of the periodic table.

== List of synthetic elements ==
The following elements do not occur naturally on Earth. All are transuranium elements and have atomic numbers of 95 and higher.

Element name	Chemical Symbol	Atomic Number	First definite synthesis
Americium	Am	95	1944
Curium	Cm	96	1944
Berkelium	Bk	97	1949
Californium	Cf	98	1950
Einsteinium	Es	99	1952
Fermium	Fm	100	1952
Mendelevium	Md	101	1955
Nobelium	No	102	1965
Lawrencium	Lr	103	1961
Rutherfordium	Rf	104	1969 (USSR and US) *
Dubnium	Db	105	1970 (USSR and US) *
Seaborgium	Sg	106	1974
Bohrium	Bh	107	1981
Hassium	Hs	108	1984
Meitnerium	Mt	109	1982
Darmstadtium	Ds	110	1994
Roentgenium	Rg	111	1994
Copernicium	Cn	112	1996
Nihonium	Nh	113	2003–04
Flerovium	Fl	114	1999
Moscovium	Mc	115	2003
Livermorium	Lv	116	2000
Tennessine	Ts	117	2009
Oganesson	Og	118	2002
* Shared credit for discovery.

== Other elements usually produced through synthesis ==
All elements with atomic numbers 1 through 94 occur naturally at least in trace quantities, but the following elements are often produced through synthesis.

Element name	Chemical symbol	Atomic number	First definite discovery	Discovery in nature
Technetium‡	Tc	43	1937	1962
Promethium‡	Pm	61	1945	1965
Polonium	Po	84	1898	
Astatine‡	At	85	1940	1943
Francium	Fr	87	1939	
Radium	Ra	88	1898	
Actinium	Ac	89	1902	
Protactinium	Pa	91	1913	
Neptunium‡	Np	93	1940	1952
Plutonium‡	Pu	94	1940	1941–42

‡ These five elements were discovered through synthesis before being found in nature.
