= Table of nuclides (segmented, wide) =

Graph of neutrons vs. protons in nuclides

Periodic table for looking up element numbers (atomic number)

These isotope tables show all of the known isotopes of the chemical elements, arranged with increasing atomic number from left to right and increasing neutron number from top to bottom.

Half lives are indicated by the color of each isotope's cell (see color chart in each section). Colored borders indicate half lives of the most stable nuclear isomer states.

The data for these tables came from Brookhaven National Laboratory which has an interactive Table of Nuclides with data on ~3000 nuclides. Recent discoveries are sourced from M. Thoennessen's "Discovery of Nuclides Project" website .

== Isotopes for elements 0-29 ==
← Previous | Next →Go to Unitized table (all elements)Go to Periodic table

Half-lives (example: Gd)
| ^{145}Gd | < 1 day |
| ^{149}Gd | 1–10 days |
| ^{146}Gd | 10–100 days |
| ^{153}Gd | 100 days–10 a |
| ^{148}Gd | 10–10,000 a |
| ^{150}Gd | 10 ka–700 Ma |
| ^{152}Gd | > 700 Ma |
| ^{158}Gd | Stable |

| Z → | 0 | 1 | 2 | 3 | | | | | | | | | | | | | | | | | | | | | | | | | | |
| n ↓ | n | H | He | Li | 4 | 5 | | | | | | | | | | | | | | | | | | | | | | | | |
|---|---|---|---|---|---|---|---|---|---|---|---|---|---|---|---|---|---|---|---|---|---|---|---|---|---|---|---|---|---|---|
| 0 | | ^{1}H | | | Be | B | 6 | 7 | | | | | | | | | | | | | | | | | | | | | | |
| 1 | ^{1}n | ^{2}H | ^{3}He | ^{4}Li | | | C | N | 8 | | | | | | | | | | | | | | | | | | | | | |
| 2 | | ^{3}H | ^{4}He | ^{5}Li | ^{6}Be | ^{7}B | ^{8}C | ^{9}N | O | 9 | | | | | | | | | | | | | | | | | | | | |
| 3 | | ^{4}H | ^{5}He | ^{6}Li | ^{7}Be | ^{8}B | ^{9}C | ^{10}N | ^{11}O | F | 10 | | | | | | | | | | | | | | | | | | | |
| 4 | | ^{5}H | ^{6}He | ^{7}Li | ^{8}Be | ^{9}B | ^{10}C | ^{11}N | ^{12}O | ^{13}F | Ne | 11 | 12 | | | | | | | | | | | | | | | | | |
| | 5 | ^{6}H | ^{7}He | ^{8}Li | ^{9}Be | ^{10}B | ^{11}C | ^{12}N | ^{13}O | ^{14}F | ^{15}Ne | Na | Mg | 13 | | | | | | | | | | | | | | | | |
| | 6 | ^{7}H | ^{8}He | ^{9}Li | ^{10}Be | ^{11}B | ^{12}C | ^{13}N | ^{14}O | ^{15}F | ^{16}Ne | ^{17}Na | ^{18}Mg | Al | 14 | | | | | | | | | | | | | | | |
| | | 7 | ^{9}He | ^{10}Li | ^{11}Be | ^{12}B | ^{13}C | ^{14}N | ^{15}O | ^{16}F | ^{17}Ne | ^{18}Na | ^{19}Mg | ^{20}Al | Si | 15 | | | | | | | | | | | | | | |
| | | 8 | ^{10}He | ^{11}Li | ^{12}Be | ^{13}B | ^{14}C | ^{15}N | ^{16}O | ^{17}F | ^{18}Ne | ^{19}Na | ^{20}Mg | ^{21}Al | ^{22}Si | P | 16 | | | | | | | | | | | | | |
| | | | 9 | ^{12}Li | ^{13}Be | ^{14}B | ^{15}C | ^{16}N | ^{17}O | ^{18}F | ^{19}Ne | ^{20}Na | ^{21}Mg | ^{22}Al | ^{23}Si | | S | 17 | 18 | | | | | | | | | | | |
| | | | 10 | ^{13}Li | ^{14}Be | ^{15}B | ^{16}C | ^{17}N | ^{18}O | ^{19}F | ^{20}Ne | ^{21}Na | ^{22}Mg | ^{23}Al | ^{24}Si | | | Cl | Ar | 19 | | | | | | | | | | |
| | | | | 11 | ^{15}Be | ^{16}B | ^{17}C | ^{18}N | ^{19}O | ^{20}F | ^{21}Ne | ^{22}Na | ^{23}Mg | ^{24}Al | ^{25}Si | ^{26}P | ^{27}S | ^{28}Cl | ^{29}Ar | K | 20 | | | | | | | | | |
| | | | | 12 | ^{16}Be | ^{17}B | ^{18}C | ^{19}N | ^{20}O | ^{21}F | ^{22}Ne | ^{23}Na | ^{24}Mg | ^{25}Al | ^{26}Si | ^{27}P | ^{28}S | ^{29}Cl | ^{30}Ar | ^{31}K | Ca | 21 | | | | | | | | |
| | | | | | 13 | ^{18}B | ^{19}C | ^{20}N | ^{21}O | ^{22}F | ^{23}Ne | ^{24}Na | ^{25}Mg | ^{26}Al | ^{27}Si | ^{28}P | ^{29}S | ^{30}Cl | ^{31}Ar | | | Sc | 22 | | | | | | | |
| | | | | | 14 | ^{19}B | ^{20}C | ^{21}N | ^{22}O | ^{23}F | ^{24}Ne | ^{25}Na | ^{26}Mg | ^{27}Al | ^{28}Si | ^{29}P | ^{30}S | ^{31}Cl | ^{32}Ar | ^{33}K | | | Ti | 23 | | | | | | |
| | | | | | 15 | ^{20}B | | ^{22}N | ^{23}O | ^{24}F | ^{25}Ne | ^{26}Na | ^{27}Mg | ^{28}Al | ^{29}Si | ^{30}P | ^{31}S | ^{32}Cl | ^{33}Ar | ^{34}K | ^{35}Ca | | | V | 24 | | | | | |
| | | | | | 16 | ^{21}B | ^{22}C | ^{23}N | ^{24}O | ^{25}F | ^{26}Ne | ^{27}Na | ^{28}Mg | ^{29}Al | ^{30}Si | ^{31}P | ^{32}S | ^{33}Cl | ^{34}Ar | ^{35}K | ^{36}Ca | ^{37}Sc | | | Cr | 25 | | | | |
| | | | | | | 17 | | | ^{25}O | ^{26}F | ^{27}Ne | ^{28}Na | ^{29}Mg | ^{30}Al | ^{31}Si | ^{32}P | ^{33}S | ^{34}Cl | ^{35}Ar | ^{36}K | ^{37}Ca | ^{38}Sc | ^{39}Ti | | | Mn | 26 | | | |
| | | | | | | | 18 | | ^{26}O | ^{27}F | ^{28}Ne | ^{29}Na | ^{30}Mg | ^{31}Al | ^{32}Si | ^{33}P | ^{34}S | ^{35}Cl | ^{36}Ar | ^{37}K | ^{38}Ca | ^{39}Sc | ^{40}Ti | | ^{42}Cr | | Fe | 27 | 28 | |
| | | | | | | | | 19 | ^{27}O | ^{28}F | ^{29}Ne | ^{30}Na | ^{31}Mg | ^{32}Al | ^{33}Si | ^{34}P | ^{35}S | ^{36}Cl | ^{37}Ar | ^{38}K | ^{39}Ca | ^{40}Sc | ^{41}Ti | | ^{43}Cr | | ^{45}Fe | Co | Ni | |
| | | | | | | | | 20 | ^{28}O | ^{29}F | ^{30}Ne | ^{31}Na | ^{32}Mg | ^{33}Al | ^{34}Si | ^{35}P | ^{36}S | ^{37}Cl | ^{38}Ar | ^{39}K | ^{40}Ca | ^{41}Sc | ^{42}Ti | ^{43}V | ^{44}Cr | | ^{46}Fe | | ^{48}Ni | |
| | | | | | | | | | 21 | ^{30}F | ^{31}Ne | ^{32}Na | ^{33}Mg | ^{34}Al | ^{35}Si | ^{36}P | ^{37}S | ^{38}Cl | ^{39}Ar | ^{40}K | ^{41}Ca | ^{42}Sc | ^{43}Ti | ^{44}V | ^{45}Cr | ^{46}Mn | ^{47}Fe | | ^{49}Ni | 29 |
| | | | | | | | | | 22 | ^{31}F | ^{32}Ne | ^{33}Na | ^{34}Mg | ^{35}Al | ^{36}Si | ^{37}P | ^{38}S | ^{39}Cl | ^{40}Ar | ^{41}K | ^{42}Ca | ^{43}Sc | ^{44}Ti | ^{45}V | ^{46}Cr | ^{47}Mn | ^{48}Fe | | ^{50}Ni | Cu |
| | | | | | | | | | | 23 | | ^{34}Na | ^{35}Mg | ^{36}Al | ^{37}Si | ^{38}P | ^{39}S | ^{40}Cl | ^{41}Ar | ^{42}K | ^{43}Ca | ^{44}Sc | ^{45}Ti | ^{46}V | ^{47}Cr | ^{48}Mn | ^{49}Fe | ^{50}Co | ^{51}Ni | |
| | | | | | | | | | | 24 | ^{34}Ne | ^{35}Na | ^{36}Mg | ^{37}Al | ^{38}Si | ^{39}P | ^{40}S | ^{41}Cl | ^{42}Ar | ^{43}K | ^{44}Ca | ^{45}Sc | ^{46}Ti | ^{47}V | ^{48}Cr | ^{49}Mn | ^{50}Fe | ^{51}Co | ^{52}Ni | |
| | | | | | | | | | | | 25 | | ^{37}Mg | ^{38}Al | ^{39}Si | ^{40}P | ^{41}S | ^{42}Cl | ^{43}Ar | ^{44}K | ^{45}Ca | ^{46}Sc | ^{47}Ti | ^{48}V | ^{49}Cr | ^{50}Mn | ^{51}Fe | ^{52}Co | ^{53}Ni | |
| | | | | | | | | | | | 26 | ^{37}Na | ^{38}Mg | ^{39}Al | ^{40}Si | ^{41}P | ^{42}S | ^{43}Cl | ^{44}Ar | ^{45}K | ^{46}Ca | ^{47}Sc | ^{48}Ti | ^{49}V | ^{50}Cr | ^{51}Mn | ^{52}Fe | ^{53}Co | ^{54}Ni | ^{55}Cu |
| | | | | | | | | | | | 27 | | | ^{40}Al | ^{41}Si | ^{42}P | ^{43}S | ^{44}Cl | ^{45}Ar | ^{46}K | ^{47}Ca | ^{48}Sc | ^{49}Ti | ^{50}V | ^{51}Cr | ^{52}Mn | ^{53}Fe | ^{54}Co | ^{55}Ni | ^{56}Cu |
| | | | | | | | | | | | 28 | ^{39}Na | ^{40}Mg | ^{41}Al | ^{42}Si | ^{43}P | ^{44}S | ^{45}Cl | ^{46}Ar | ^{47}K | ^{48}Ca | ^{49}Sc | ^{50}Ti | ^{51}V | ^{52}Cr | ^{53}Mn | ^{54}Fe | ^{55}Co | ^{56}Ni | ^{57}Cu |
| | | | | | | | | | | | | 29 | | ^{42}Al | ^{43}Si | ^{44}P | ^{45}S | ^{46}Cl | ^{47}Ar | ^{48}K | ^{49}Ca | ^{50}Sc | ^{51}Ti | ^{52}V | ^{53}Cr | ^{54}Mn | ^{55}Fe | ^{56}Co | ^{57}Ni | ^{58}Cu |
| | | | | | | | | | | | | | 30 | ^{43}Al | ^{44}Si | ^{45}P | ^{46}S | ^{47}Cl | ^{48}Ar | ^{49}K | ^{50}Ca | ^{51}Sc | ^{52}Ti | ^{53}V | ^{54}Cr | ^{55}Mn | ^{56}Fe | ^{57}Co | ^{58}Ni | ^{59}Cu |
| | | | | | | | | | | | | | | 31 | ^{45}Si | ^{46}P | ^{47}S | ^{48}Cl | ^{49}Ar | ^{50}K | ^{51}Ca | ^{52}Sc | ^{53}Ti | ^{54}V | ^{55}Cr | ^{56}Mn | ^{57}Fe | ^{58}Co | ^{59}Ni | ^{60}Cu |
| | | | | | | | | | | | | | | 32 | ^{46}Si | ^{47}P | ^{48}S | ^{49}Cl | ^{50}Ar | ^{51}K | ^{52}Ca | ^{53}Sc | ^{54}Ti | ^{55}V | ^{56}Cr | ^{57}Mn | ^{58}Fe | ^{59}Co | ^{60}Ni | ^{61}Cu |
| | | | | | | | | | | | | | | | | 33 | ^{49}S | ^{50}Cl | ^{51}Ar | ^{52}K | ^{53}Ca | ^{54}Sc | ^{55}Ti | ^{56}V | ^{57}Cr | ^{58}Mn | ^{59}Fe | ^{60}Co | ^{61}Ni | ^{62}Cu |
| | | | | | | | | | | | | | | | | | 34 | ^{51}Cl | ^{52}Ar | ^{53}K | ^{54}Ca | ^{55}Sc | ^{56}Ti | ^{57}V | ^{58}Cr | ^{59}Mn | ^{60}Fe | ^{61}Co | ^{62}Ni | ^{63}Cu |
| | | | | | | | | | | | | | | | | | 35 | ^{52}Cl | ^{53}Ar | ^{54}K | ^{55}Ca | ^{56}Sc | ^{57}Ti | ^{58}V | ^{59}Cr | ^{60}Mn | ^{61}Fe | ^{62}Co | ^{63}Ni | ^{64}Cu |
| | | | | | | | | | | | | | | | | | | 36 | ^{54}Ar | ^{55}K | ^{56}Ca | ^{57}Sc | ^{58}Ti | ^{59}V | ^{60}Cr | ^{61}Mn | ^{62}Fe | ^{63}Co | ^{64}Ni | ^{65}Cu |
| | | | | | | | | | | | | | | | | | | | 37 | ^{56}K | ^{57}Ca | ^{58}Sc | ^{59}Ti | ^{60}V | ^{61}Cr | ^{62}Mn | ^{63}Fe | ^{64}Co | ^{65}Ni | ^{66}Cu |
| | | | | | | | | | | | | | | | | | | | 38 | ^{57}K | ^{58}Ca | ^{59}Sc | ^{60}Ti | ^{61}V | ^{62}Cr | ^{63}Mn | ^{64}Fe | ^{65}Co | ^{66}Ni | ^{67}Cu |
| | | | | | | | | | | | | | | | | | | | 39 | | ^{59}Ca | ^{60}Sc | ^{61}Ti | ^{62}V | ^{63}Cr | ^{64}Mn | ^{65}Fe | ^{66}Co | ^{67}Ni | ^{68}Cu |
| | | | | | | | | | | | | | | | | | | | 40 | ^{59}K | ^{60}Ca | ^{61}Sc | ^{62}Ti | ^{63}V | ^{64}Cr | ^{65}Mn | ^{66}Fe | ^{67}Co | ^{68}Ni | ^{69}Cu |
| | | | | | | | | | | | | | | | | | | | | 41 | | ^{62}Sc | ^{63}Ti | ^{64}V | ^{65}Cr | ^{66}Mn | ^{67}Fe | ^{68}Co | ^{69}Ni | ^{70}Cu |
| | | | | | | | | | | | | | | | | | | | | | 42 | | ^{64}Ti | ^{65}V | ^{66}Cr | ^{67}Mn | ^{68}Fe | ^{69}Co | ^{70}Ni | ^{71}Cu |
| | | | | | | | | | | | | | | | | | | | | | | 43 | | ^{66}V | ^{67}Cr | ^{68}Mn | ^{69}Fe | ^{70}Co | ^{71}Ni | ^{72}Cu |
| | | | | | | | | | | | | | | | | | | | | | | | 44 | ^{67}V | ^{68}Cr | ^{69}Mn | ^{70}Fe | ^{71}Co | ^{72}Ni | ^{73}Cu |
| | | | | | | | | | | | | | | | | | | | | | | | | 45 | ^{69}Cr | ^{70}Mn | ^{71}Fe | ^{72}Co | ^{73}Ni | ^{74}Cu |
| | | | | | | | | | | | | | | | | | | | | | | | | 46 | ^{70}Cr | ^{71}Mn | ^{72}Fe | ^{73}Co | ^{74}Ni | ^{75}Cu |
| | | | | | | | | | | | | | | | | | | | | | | | | | 47 | ^{72}Mn | ^{73}Fe | ^{74}Co | ^{75}Ni | ^{76}Cu |
| | | | | | | | | | | | | | | | | | | | | | | | | | 48 | ^{73}Mn | ^{74}Fe | ^{75}Co | ^{76}Ni | ^{77}Cu |
| | | | | | | | | | | | | | | | | | | | | | | | | | | 49 | ^{75}Fe | ^{76}Co | ^{77}Ni | ^{78}Cu |
| | | | | | | | | | | | | | | | | | | | | | | | | | | 50 | ^{76}Fe | ^{77}Co | ^{78}Ni | ^{79}Cu |
| | | | | | | | | | | | | | | | | | | | | | | | | | | | 51 | ^{78}Co | ^{79}Ni | ^{80}Cu |
| | | | | | | | | | | | | | | | | | | | | | | | | | | | | 52 | ^{80}Ni | ^{81}Cu |
| | | | | | | | | | | | | | | | | | | | | | | | | | | | | 53 | ^{81}Ni | ^{82}Cu |
| | | | | | | | | | | | | | | | | | | | | | | | | | | | | 54 | ^{82}Ni | ^{83}Cu |

== Isotopes for elements 30-59 ==
← Previous | Next →Go to Unitized table (all elements)Go to Periodic table

Half-lives (example: Gd)
| ^{145}Gd | < 1 day |
| ^{149}Gd | 1–10 days |
| ^{146}Gd | 10–100 days |
| ^{153}Gd | 100 days–10 a |
| ^{148}Gd | 10–10,000 a |
| ^{150}Gd | 10 ka–700 Ma |
| ^{152}Gd | > 700 Ma |
| ^{158}Gd | Stable |

| Z → | 30 | | | | | | | | | | | | | | | | | | | | | | | | | | | | | |
| n ↓ | Zn | 31 | | | | | | | | | | | | | | | | | | | | | | | | | | | | |
|---|---|---|---|---|---|---|---|---|---|---|---|---|---|---|---|---|---|---|---|---|---|---|---|---|---|---|---|---|---|---|
| 25 | ^{55}Zn | | Ge | 33 | | | | | | | | | | | | | | | | | | | | | | | | | | |
| 26 | ^{56}Zn | | | As | | | | | | | | | | | | | | | | | | | | | | | | | | |
| 27 | ^{57}Zn | | ^{59}Ge | | 34 | | | | | | | | | | | | | | | | | | | | | | | | | |
| 28 | ^{58}Zn | | ^{60}Ge | | Se | 35 | | | | | | | | | | | | | | | | | | | | | | | | |
| 29 | ^{59}Zn | ^{60}Ga | ^{61}Ge | | ^{63}Se | Br | 36 | | | | | | | | | | | | | | | | | | | | | | | |
| 30 | ^{60}Zn | ^{61}Ga | ^{62}Ge | | ^{64}Se | | Kr | | | | | | | | | | | | | | | | | | | | | | | |
| 31 | ^{61}Zn | ^{62}Ga | ^{63}Ge | ^{64}As | ^{65}Se | | ^{67}Kr | | | | | | | | | | | | | | | | | | | | | | | |
| 32 | ^{62}Zn | ^{63}Ga | ^{64}Ge | ^{65}As | ^{66}Se | | ^{68}Kr | 37 | | | | | | | | | | | | | | | | | | | | | | |
| 33 | ^{63}Zn | ^{64}Ga | ^{65}Ge | ^{66}As | ^{67}Se | ^{68}Br | ^{69}Kr | Rb | 38 | | | | | | | | | | | | | | | | | | | | | |
| 34 | ^{64}Zn | ^{65}Ga | ^{66}Ge | ^{67}As | ^{68}Se | ^{69}Br | ^{70}Kr | | Sr | 39 | | | | | | | | | | | | | | | | | | | | |
| 35 | ^{65}Zn | ^{66}Ga | ^{67}Ge | ^{68}As | ^{69}Se | ^{70}Br | ^{71}Kr | ^{72}Rb | ^{73}Sr | Y | 40 | | | | | | | | | | | | | | | | | | | |
| 36 | ^{66}Zn | ^{67}Ga | ^{68}Ge | ^{69}As | ^{70}Se | ^{71}Br | ^{72}Kr | ^{73}Rb | ^{74}Sr | | Zr | 41 | | | | | | | | | | | | | | | | | | |
| 37 | ^{67}Zn | ^{68}Ga | ^{69}Ge | ^{70}As | ^{71}Se | ^{72}Br | ^{73}Kr | ^{74}Rb | ^{75}Sr | ^{76}Y | ^{77}Zr | Nb | 42 | | | | | | | | | | | | | | | | | |
| 38 | ^{68}Zn | ^{69}Ga | ^{70}Ge | ^{71}As | ^{72}Se | ^{73}Br | ^{74}Kr | ^{75}Rb | ^{76}Sr | ^{77}Y | ^{78}Zr | | Mo | 43 | | | | | | | | | | | | | | | | |
| 39 | ^{69}Zn | ^{70}Ga | ^{71}Ge | ^{72}As | ^{73}Se | ^{74}Br | ^{75}Kr | ^{76}Rb | ^{77}Sr | ^{78}Y | ^{79}Zr | | ^{81}Mo | Tc | 44 | | | | | | | | | | | | | | | |
| 40 | ^{70}Zn | ^{71}Ga | ^{72}Ge | ^{73}As | ^{74}Se | ^{75}Br | ^{76}Kr | ^{77}Rb | ^{78}Sr | ^{79}Y | ^{80}Zr | | ^{82}Mo | | Ru | | | | | | | | | | | | | | | |
| 41 | ^{71}Zn | ^{72}Ga | ^{73}Ge | ^{74}As | ^{75}Se | ^{76}Br | ^{77}Kr | ^{78}Rb | ^{79}Sr | ^{80}Y | ^{81}Zr | ^{82}Nb | ^{83}Mo | | ^{85}Ru | 45 | | | | | | | | | | | | | | |
| 42 | ^{72}Zn | ^{73}Ga | ^{74}Ge | ^{75}As | ^{76}Se | ^{77}Br | ^{78}Kr | ^{79}Rb | ^{80}Sr | ^{81}Y | ^{82}Zr | ^{83}Nb | ^{84}Mo | | ^{86}Ru | Rh | 46 | | | | | | | | | | | | | |
| 43 | ^{73}Zn | ^{74}Ga | ^{75}Ge | ^{76}As | ^{77}Se | ^{78}Br | ^{79}Kr | ^{80}Rb | ^{81}Sr | ^{82}Y | ^{83}Zr | ^{84}Nb | ^{85}Mo | ^{86}Tc | ^{87}Ru | | Pd | 47 | | | | | | | | | | | | |
| 44 | ^{74}Zn | ^{75}Ga | ^{76}Ge | ^{77}As | ^{78}Se | ^{79}Br | ^{80}Kr | ^{81}Rb | ^{82}Sr | ^{83}Y | ^{84}Zr | ^{85}Nb | ^{86}Mo | ^{87}Tc | ^{88}Ru | ^{89}Rh | ^{90}Pd | Ag | 48 | | | | | | | | | | | |
| 45 | ^{75}Zn | ^{76}Ga | ^{77}Ge | ^{78}As | ^{79}Se | ^{80}Br | ^{81}Kr | ^{82}Rb | ^{83}Sr | ^{84}Y | ^{85}Zr | ^{86}Nb | ^{87}Mo | ^{88}Tc | ^{89}Ru | ^{90}Rh | ^{91}Pd | ^{92}Ag | Cd | 49 | | | | | | | | | | |
| 46 | ^{76}Zn | ^{77}Ga | ^{78}Ge | ^{79}As | ^{80}Se | ^{81}Br | ^{82}Kr | ^{83}Rb | ^{84}Sr | ^{85}Y | ^{86}Zr | ^{87}Nb | ^{88}Mo | ^{89}Tc | ^{90}Ru | ^{91}Rh | ^{92}Pd | ^{93}Ag | ^{94}Cd | In | | | | | | | | | | |
| 47 | ^{77}Zn | ^{78}Ga | ^{79}Ge | ^{80}As | ^{81}Se | ^{82}Br | ^{83}Kr | ^{84}Rb | ^{85}Sr | ^{86}Y | ^{87}Zr | ^{88}Nb | ^{89}Mo | ^{90}Tc | ^{91}Ru | ^{92}Rh | ^{93}Pd | ^{94}Ag | ^{95}Cd | ^{96}In | 50 | | | | | | | | | |
| 48 | ^{78}Zn | ^{79}Ga | ^{80}Ge | ^{81}As | ^{82}Se | ^{83}Br | ^{84}Kr | ^{85}Rb | ^{86}Sr | ^{87}Y | ^{88}Zr | ^{89}Nb | ^{90}Mo | ^{91}Tc | ^{92}Ru | ^{93}Rh | ^{94}Pd | ^{95}Ag | ^{96}Cd | ^{97}In | Sn | | | | | | | | | |
| 49 | ^{79}Zn | ^{80}Ga | ^{81}Ge | ^{82}As | ^{83}Se | ^{84}Br | ^{85}Kr | ^{86}Rb | ^{87}Sr | ^{88}Y | ^{89}Zr | ^{90}Nb | ^{91}Mo | ^{92}Tc | ^{93}Ru | ^{94}Rh | ^{95}Pd | ^{96}Ag | ^{97}Cd | ^{98}In | ^{99}Sn | 51 | | | | | | | | |
| 50 | ^{80}Zn | ^{81}Ga | ^{82}Ge | ^{83}As | ^{84}Se | ^{85}Br | ^{86}Kr | ^{87}Rb | ^{88}Sr | ^{89}Y | ^{90}Zr | ^{91}Nb | ^{92}Mo | ^{93}Tc | ^{94}Ru | ^{95}Rh | ^{96}Pd | ^{97}Ag | ^{98}Cd | ^{99}In | ^{100}Sn | Sb | 52 | | | | | | | |
| 51 | ^{81}Zn | ^{82}Ga | ^{83}Ge | ^{84}As | ^{85}Se | ^{86}Br | ^{87}Kr | ^{88}Rb | ^{89}Sr | ^{90}Y | ^{91}Zr | ^{92}Nb | ^{93}Mo | ^{94}Tc | ^{95}Ru | ^{96}Rh | ^{97}Pd | ^{98}Ag | ^{99}Cd | ^{100}In | ^{101}Sn | | Te | 53 | | | | | | |
| 52 | ^{82}Zn | ^{83}Ga | ^{84}Ge | ^{85}As | ^{86}Se | ^{87}Br | ^{88}Kr | ^{89}Rb | ^{90}Sr | ^{91}Y | ^{92}Zr | ^{93}Nb | ^{94}Mo | ^{95}Tc | ^{96}Ru | ^{97}Rh | ^{98}Pd | ^{99}Ag | ^{100}Cd | ^{101}In | ^{102}Sn | ^{103}Sb | ^{104}Te | I | 54 | | | | | |
| 53 | ^{83}Zn | ^{84}Ga | ^{85}Ge | ^{86}As | ^{87}Se | ^{88}Br | ^{89}Kr | ^{90}Rb | ^{91}Sr | ^{92}Y | ^{93}Zr | ^{94}Nb | ^{95}Mo | ^{96}Tc | ^{97}Ru | ^{98}Rh | ^{99}Pd | ^{100}Ag | ^{101}Cd | ^{102}In | ^{103}Sn | ^{104}Sb | ^{105}Te | | Xe | | | | | |
| 54 | ^{84}Zn | ^{85}Ga | ^{86}Ge | ^{87}As | ^{88}Se | ^{89}Br | ^{90}Kr | ^{91}Rb | ^{92}Sr | ^{93}Y | ^{94}Zr | ^{95}Nb | ^{96}Mo | ^{97}Tc | ^{98}Ru | ^{99}Rh | ^{100}Pd | ^{101}Ag | ^{102}Cd | ^{103}In | ^{104}Sn | ^{105}Sb | ^{106}Te | | ^{108}Xe | 55 | | | | |
| 55 | ^{85}Zn | ^{86}Ga | ^{87}Ge | ^{88}As | ^{89}Se | ^{90}Br | ^{91}Kr | ^{92}Rb | ^{93}Sr | ^{94}Y | ^{95}Zr | ^{96}Nb | ^{97}Mo | ^{98}Tc | ^{99}Ru | ^{100}Rh | ^{101}Pd | ^{102}Ag | ^{103}Cd | ^{104}In | ^{105}Sn | ^{106}Sb | ^{107}Te | ^{108}I | ^{109}Xe | Cs | 56 | | | |
| | 56 | ^{87}Ga | ^{88}Ge | ^{89}As | ^{90}Se | ^{91}Br | ^{92}Kr | ^{93}Rb | ^{94}Sr | ^{95}Y | ^{96}Zr | ^{97}Nb | ^{98}Mo | ^{99}Tc | ^{100}Ru | ^{101}Rh | ^{102}Pd | ^{103}Ag | ^{104}Cd | ^{105}In | ^{106}Sn | ^{107}Sb | ^{108}Te | ^{109}I | ^{110}Xe | | Ba | | | |
| | 57 | | ^{89}Ge | ^{90}As | ^{91}Se | ^{92}Br | ^{93}Kr | ^{94}Rb | ^{95}Sr | ^{96}Y | ^{97}Zr | ^{98}Nb | ^{99}Mo | ^{100}Tc | ^{101}Ru | ^{102}Rh | ^{103}Pd | ^{104}Ag | ^{105}Cd | ^{106}In | ^{107}Sn | ^{108}Sb | ^{109}Te | ^{110}I | ^{111}Xe | ^{112}Cs | | 57 | | |
| | | 58 | ^{90}Ge | ^{91}As | ^{92}Se | ^{93}Br | ^{94}Kr | ^{95}Rb | ^{96}Sr | ^{97}Y | ^{98}Zr | ^{99}Nb | ^{100}Mo | ^{101}Tc | ^{102}Ru | ^{103}Rh | ^{104}Pd | ^{105}Ag | ^{106}Cd | ^{107}In | ^{108}Sn | ^{109}Sb | ^{110}Te | ^{111}I | ^{112}Xe | ^{113}Cs | ^{114}Ba | La | | |
| | | | 59 | ^{92}As | ^{93}Se | ^{94}Br | ^{95}Kr | ^{96}Rb | ^{97}Sr | ^{98}Y | ^{99}Zr | ^{100}Nb | ^{101}Mo | ^{102}Tc | ^{103}Ru | ^{104}Rh | ^{105}Pd | ^{106}Ag | ^{107}Cd | ^{108}In | ^{109}Sn | ^{110}Sb | ^{111}Te | ^{112}I | ^{113}Xe | ^{114}Cs | ^{115}Ba | | 58 | |
| | | | | 60 | ^{94}Se | ^{95}Br | ^{96}Kr | ^{97}Rb | ^{98}Sr | ^{99}Y | ^{100}Zr | ^{101}Nb | ^{102}Mo | ^{103}Tc | ^{104}Ru | ^{105}Rh | ^{106}Pd | ^{107}Ag | ^{108}Cd | ^{109}In | ^{110}Sn | ^{111}Sb | ^{112}Te | ^{113}I | ^{114}Xe | ^{115}Cs | ^{116}Ba | ^{117}La | Ce | 59 |
| | | | | 61 | ^{95}Se | ^{96}Br | ^{97}Kr | ^{98}Rb | ^{99}Sr | ^{100}Y | ^{101}Zr | ^{102}Nb | ^{103}Mo | ^{104}Tc | ^{105}Ru | ^{106}Rh | ^{107}Pd | ^{108}Ag | ^{109}Cd | ^{110}In | ^{111}Sn | ^{112}Sb | ^{113}Te | ^{114}I | ^{115}Xe | ^{116}Cs | ^{117}Ba | ^{118}La | | Pr |
| | | | | | 62 | ^{97}Br | ^{98}Kr | ^{99}Rb | ^{100}Sr | ^{101}Y | ^{102}Zr | ^{103}Nb | ^{104}Mo | ^{105}Tc | ^{106}Ru | ^{107}Rh | ^{108}Pd | ^{109}Ag | ^{110}Cd | ^{111}In | ^{112}Sn | ^{113}Sb | ^{114}Te | ^{115}I | ^{116}Xe | ^{117}Cs | ^{118}Ba | ^{119}La | | ^{121}Pr |
| | | | | | 63 | ^{98}Br | ^{99}Kr | ^{100}Rb | ^{101}Sr | ^{102}Y | ^{103}Zr | ^{104}Nb | ^{105}Mo | ^{106}Tc | ^{107}Ru | ^{108}Rh | ^{109}Pd | ^{110}Ag | ^{111}Cd | ^{112}In | ^{113}Sn | ^{114}Sb | ^{115}Te | ^{116}I | ^{117}Xe | ^{118}Cs | ^{119}Ba | ^{120}La | ^{121}Ce | ^{122}Pr |
| | | | | | 64 | | ^{100}Kr | ^{101}Rb | ^{102}Sr | ^{103}Y | ^{104}Zr | ^{105}Nb | ^{106}Mo | ^{107}Tc | ^{108}Ru | ^{109}Rh | ^{110}Pd | ^{111}Ag | ^{112}Cd | ^{113}In | ^{114}Sn | ^{115}Sb | ^{116}Te | ^{117}I | ^{118}Xe | ^{119}Cs | ^{120}Ba | ^{121}La | ^{122}Ce | ^{123}Pr |
| | | | | | 65 | | ^{101}Kr | ^{102}Rb | ^{103}Sr | ^{104}Y | ^{105}Zr | ^{106}Nb | ^{107}Mo | ^{108}Tc | ^{109}Ru | ^{110}Rh | ^{111}Pd | ^{112}Ag | ^{113}Cd | ^{114}In | ^{115}Sn | ^{116}Sb | ^{117}Te | ^{118}I | ^{119}Xe | ^{120}Cs | ^{121}Ba | ^{122}La | ^{123}Ce | ^{124}Pr |
| | | | | | 66 | ^{101}Br | ^{102}Kr | ^{103}Rb | ^{104}Sr | ^{105}Y | ^{106}Zr | ^{107}Nb | ^{108}Mo | ^{109}Tc | ^{110}Ru | ^{111}Rh | ^{112}Pd | ^{113}Ag | ^{114}Cd | ^{115}In | ^{116}Sn | ^{117}Sb | ^{118}Te | ^{119}I | ^{120}Xe | ^{121}Cs | ^{122}Ba | ^{123}La | ^{124}Ce | ^{125}Pr |
| | | | | | | | 67 | ^{104}Rb | ^{105}Sr | ^{106}Y | ^{107}Zr | ^{108}Nb | ^{109}Mo | ^{110}Tc | ^{111}Ru | ^{112}Rh | ^{113}Pd | ^{114}Ag | ^{115}Cd | ^{116}In | ^{117}Sn | ^{118}Sb | ^{119}Te | ^{120}I | ^{121}Xe | ^{122}Cs | ^{123}Ba | ^{124}La | ^{125}Ce | ^{126}Pr |
| | | | | | | | 68 | ^{105}Rb | ^{106}Sr | ^{107}Y | ^{108}Zr | ^{109}Nb | ^{110}Mo | ^{111}Tc | ^{112}Ru | ^{113}Rh | ^{114}Pd | ^{115}Ag | ^{116}Cd | ^{117}In | ^{118}Sn | ^{119}Sb | ^{120}Te | ^{121}I | ^{122}Xe | ^{123}Cs | ^{124}Ba | ^{125}La | ^{126}Ce | ^{127}Pr |
| | | | | | | | 69 | ^{106}Rb | ^{107}Sr | ^{108}Y | ^{109}Zr | ^{110}Nb | ^{111}Mo | ^{112}Tc | ^{113}Ru | ^{114}Rh | ^{115}Pd | ^{116}Ag | ^{117}Cd | ^{118}In | ^{119}Sn | ^{120}Sb | ^{121}Te | ^{122}I | ^{123}Xe | ^{124}Cs | ^{125}Ba | ^{126}La | ^{127}Ce | ^{128}Pr |
| | | | | | | | | 70 | ^{108}Sr | ^{109}Y | ^{110}Zr | ^{111}Nb | ^{112}Mo | ^{113}Tc | ^{114}Ru | ^{115}Rh | ^{116}Pd | ^{117}Ag | ^{118}Cd | ^{119}In | ^{120}Sn | ^{121}Sb | ^{122}Te | ^{123}I | ^{124}Xe | ^{125}Cs | ^{126}Ba | ^{127}La | ^{128}Ce | ^{129}Pr |
| | | | | | | | | | 71 | ^{110}Y | ^{111}Zr | ^{112}Nb | ^{113}Mo | ^{114}Tc | ^{115}Ru | ^{116}Rh | ^{117}Pd | ^{118}Ag | ^{119}Cd | ^{120}In | ^{121}Sn | ^{122}Sb | ^{123}Te | ^{124}I | ^{125}Xe | ^{126}Cs | ^{127}Ba | ^{128}La | ^{129}Ce | ^{130}Pr |
| | | | | | | | | | 72 | ^{111}Y | ^{112}Zr | ^{113}Nb | ^{114}Mo | ^{115}Tc | ^{116}Ru | ^{117}Rh | ^{118}Pd | ^{119}Ag | ^{120}Cd | ^{121}In | ^{122}Sn | ^{123}Sb | ^{124}Te | ^{125}I | ^{126}Xe | ^{127}Cs | ^{128}Ba | ^{129}La | ^{130}Ce | ^{131}Pr |
| | | | | | | | | | | 73 | ^{113}Zr | ^{114}Nb | ^{115}Mo | ^{116}Tc | ^{117}Ru | ^{118}Rh | ^{119}Pd | ^{120}Ag | ^{121}Cd | ^{122}In | ^{123}Sn | ^{124}Sb | ^{125}Te | ^{126}I | ^{127}Xe | ^{128}Cs | ^{129}Ba | ^{130}La | ^{131}Ce | ^{132}Pr |
| | | | | | | | | | | | 74 | ^{115}Nb | ^{116}Mo | ^{117}Tc | ^{118}Ru | ^{119}Rh | ^{120}Pd | ^{121}Ag | ^{122}Cd | ^{123}In | ^{124}Sn | ^{125}Sb | ^{126}Te | ^{127}I | ^{128}Xe | ^{129}Cs | ^{130}Ba | ^{131}La | ^{132}Ce | ^{133}Pr |
| | | | | | | | | | | | 75 | ^{116}Nb | ^{117}Mo | ^{118}Tc | ^{119}Ru | ^{120}Rh | ^{121}Pd | ^{122}Ag | ^{123}Cd | ^{124}In | ^{125}Sn | ^{126}Sb | ^{127}Te | ^{128}I | ^{129}Xe | ^{130}Cs | ^{131}Ba | ^{132}La | ^{133}Ce | ^{134}Pr |
| | | | | | | | | | | | 76 | ^{117}Nb | ^{118}Mo | ^{119}Tc | ^{120}Ru | ^{121}Rh | ^{122}Pd | ^{123}Ag | ^{124}Cd | ^{125}In | ^{126}Sn | ^{127}Sb | ^{128}Te | ^{129}I | ^{130}Xe | ^{131}Cs | ^{132}Ba | ^{133}La | ^{134}Ce | ^{135}Pr |
| | | | | | | | | | | | | 77 | ^{119}Mo | ^{120}Tc | ^{121}Ru | ^{122}Rh | ^{123}Pd | ^{124}Ag | ^{125}Cd | ^{126}In | ^{127}Sn | ^{128}Sb | ^{129}Te | ^{130}I | ^{131}Xe | ^{132}Cs | ^{133}Ba | ^{134}La | ^{135}Ce | ^{136}Pr |
| | | | | | | | | | | | | | 78 | ^{121}Tc | ^{122}Ru | ^{123}Rh | ^{124}Pd | ^{125}Ag | ^{126}Cd | ^{127}In | ^{128}Sn | ^{129}Sb | ^{130}Te | ^{131}I | ^{132}Xe | ^{133}Cs | ^{134}Ba | ^{135}La | ^{136}Ce | ^{137}Pr |
| | | | | | | | | | | | | | 79 | ^{122}Tc | ^{123}Ru | ^{124}Rh | ^{125}Pd | ^{126}Ag | ^{127}Cd | ^{128}In | ^{129}Sn | ^{130}Sb | ^{131}Te | ^{132}I | ^{133}Xe | ^{134}Cs | ^{135}Ba | ^{136}La | ^{137}Ce | ^{138}Pr |
| | | | | | | | | | | | | | | 80 | ^{124}Ru | ^{125}Rh | ^{126}Pd | ^{127}Ag | ^{128}Cd | ^{129}In | ^{130}Sn | ^{131}Sb | ^{132}Te | ^{133}I | ^{134}Xe | ^{135}Cs | ^{136}Ba | ^{137}La | ^{138}Ce | ^{139}Pr |
| | | | | | | | | | | | | | | 81 | ^{125}Ru | ^{126}Rh | ^{127}Pd | ^{128}Ag | ^{129}Cd | ^{130}In | ^{131}Sn | ^{132}Sb | ^{133}Te | ^{134}I | ^{135}Xe | ^{136}Cs | ^{137}Ba | ^{138}La | ^{139}Ce | ^{140}Pr |
| | | | | | | | | | | | | | | | 82 | ^{127}Rh | ^{128}Pd | ^{129}Ag | ^{130}Cd | ^{131}In | ^{132}Sn | ^{133}Sb | ^{134}Te | ^{135}I | ^{136}Xe | ^{137}Cs | ^{138}Ba | ^{139}La | ^{140}Ce | ^{141}Pr |
| | | | | | | | | | | | | | | | 83 | ^{128}Rh | ^{129}Pd | ^{130}Ag | ^{131}Cd | ^{132}In | ^{133}Sn | ^{134}Sb | ^{135}Te | ^{136}I | ^{137}Xe | ^{138}Cs | ^{139}Ba | ^{140}La | ^{141}Ce | ^{142}Pr |
| | | | | | | | | | | | | | | | | 84 | ^{130}Pd | ^{131}Ag | ^{132}Cd | ^{133}In | ^{134}Sn | ^{135}Sb | ^{136}Te | ^{137}I | ^{138}Xe | ^{139}Cs | ^{140}Ba | ^{141}La | ^{142}Ce | ^{143}Pr |
| | | | | | | | | | | | | | | | | 85 | ^{131}Pd | ^{132}Ag | ^{133}Cd | ^{134}In | ^{135}Sn | ^{136}Sb | ^{137}Te | ^{138}I | ^{139}Xe | ^{140}Cs | ^{141}Ba | ^{142}La | ^{143}Ce | ^{144}Pr |
| | | | | | | | | | | | | | | | | | 86 | | ^{134}Cd | ^{135}In | ^{136}Sn | ^{137}Sb | ^{138}Te | ^{139}I | ^{140}Xe | ^{141}Cs | ^{142}Ba | ^{143}La | ^{144}Ce | ^{145}Pr |
| | | | | | | | | | | | | | | | | | | 87 | | ^{136}In | ^{137}Sn | ^{138}Sb | ^{139}Te | ^{140}I | ^{141}Xe | ^{142}Cs | ^{143}Ba | ^{144}La | ^{145}Ce | ^{146}Pr |
| | | | | | | | | | | | | | | | | | | | 88 | ^{137}In | ^{138}Sn | ^{139}Sb | ^{140}Te | ^{141}I | ^{142}Xe | ^{143}Cs | ^{144}Ba | ^{145}La | ^{146}Ce | ^{147}Pr |
| | | | | | | | | | | | | | | | | | | | | 89 | ^{139}Sn | ^{140}Sb | ^{141}Te | ^{142}I | ^{143}Xe | ^{144}Cs | ^{145}Ba | ^{146}La | ^{147}Ce | ^{148}Pr |
| | | | | | | | | | | | | | | | | | | | | 90 | ^{140}Sn | ^{141}Sb | ^{142}Te | ^{143}I | ^{144}Xe | ^{145}Cs | ^{146}Ba | ^{147}La | ^{148}Ce | ^{149}Pr |
| | | | | | | | | | | | | | | | | | | | | | 91 | ^{142}Sb | ^{143}Te | ^{144}I | ^{145}Xe | ^{146}Cs | ^{147}Ba | ^{148}La | ^{149}Ce | ^{150}Pr |
| | | | | | | | | | | | | | | | | | | | | | | 92 | ^{144}Te | ^{145}I | ^{146}Xe | ^{147}Cs | ^{148}Ba | ^{149}La | ^{150}Ce | ^{151}Pr |
| | | | | | | | | | | | | | | | | | | | | | | 93 | ^{145}Te | ^{146}I | ^{147}Xe | ^{148}Cs | ^{149}Ba | ^{150}La | ^{151}Ce | ^{152}Pr |
| | | | | | | | | | | | | | | | | | | | | | | | 94 | ^{147}I | ^{148}Xe | ^{149}Cs | ^{150}Ba | ^{151}La | ^{152}Ce | ^{153}Pr |
| | | | | | | | | | | | | | | | | | | | | | | | | 95 | ^{149}Xe | ^{150}Cs | ^{151}Ba | ^{152}La | ^{153}Ce | ^{154}Pr |
| | | | | | | | | | | | | | | | | | | | | | | | | 96 | ^{150}Xe | ^{151}Cs | ^{152}Ba | ^{153}La | ^{154}Ce | ^{155}Pr |
| | | | | | | | | | | | | | | | | | | | | | | | | | 97 | ^{152}Cs | ^{153}Ba | ^{154}La | ^{155}Ce | ^{156}Pr |
| | | | | | | | | | | | | | | | | | | | | | | | | | | 98 | ^{154}Ba | ^{155}La | ^{156}Ce | ^{157}Pr |
| | | | | | | | | | | | | | | | | | | | | | | | | | | | 99 | ^{156}La | ^{157}Ce | ^{158}Pr |
| | | | | | | | | | | | | | | | | | | | | | | | | | | | 100 | ^{157}La | ^{158}Ce | ^{159}Pr |
| | | | | | | | | | | | | | | | | | | | | | | | | | | | | 101 | | ^{160}Pr |
| | | | | | | | | | | | | | | | | | | | | | | | | | | | | | 102 | ^{161}Pr |

== Isotopes for elements 60-89 ==
← Previous | Next →Go to Unitized table (all elements)Go to Periodic table

Half-lives (example: Gd)
| ^{145}Gd | < 1 day |
| ^{149}Gd | 1–10 days |
| ^{146}Gd | 10–100 days |
| ^{153}Gd | 100 days–10 a |
| ^{148}Gd | 10–10,000 a |
| ^{150}Gd | 10 ka–700 Ma |
| ^{152}Gd | > 700 Ma |
| ^{158}Gd | Stable |

| Z → | 60 | | | | | | | | | | | | | | | | | | | | | | | | | | | | | |
| n ↓ | Nd | 61 | | | | | | | | | | | | | | | | | | | | | | | | | | | | |
|---|---|---|---|---|---|---|---|---|---|---|---|---|---|---|---|---|---|---|---|---|---|---|---|---|---|---|---|---|---|---|
| 64 | | Pm | 62 | | | | | | | | | | | | | | | | | | | | | | | | | | | |
| 65 | ^{125}Nd | | Sm | 63 | | | | | | | | | | | | | | | | | | | | | | | | | | |
| 66 | ^{126}Nd | | | Eu | | | | | | | | | | | | | | | | | | | | | | | | | | |
| 67 | ^{127}Nd | ^{128}Pm | ^{129}Sm | ^{130}Eu | 64 | | | | | | | | | | | | | | | | | | | | | | | | | |
| 68 | ^{128}Nd | ^{129}Pm | ^{130}Sm | ^{131}Eu | Gd | 65 | | | | | | | | | | | | | | | | | | | | | | | | |
| 69 | ^{129}Nd | ^{130}Pm | ^{131}Sm | | | Tb | | | | | | | | | | | | | | | | | | | | | | | | |
| 70 | ^{130}Nd | ^{131}Pm | ^{132}Sm | | | ^{135}Tb | 66 | | | | | | | | | | | | | | | | | | | | | | | |
| 71 | ^{131}Nd | ^{132}Pm | ^{133}Sm | ^{134}Eu | ^{135}Gd | | Dy | 67 | | | | | | | | | | | | | | | | | | | | | | |
| 72 | ^{132}Nd | ^{133}Pm | ^{134}Sm | ^{135}Eu | ^{136}Gd | | | Ho | 68 | | | | | | | | | | | | | | | | | | | | | |
| 73 | ^{133}Nd | ^{134}Pm | ^{135}Sm | ^{136}Eu | ^{137}Gd | ^{138}Tb | ^{139}Dy | ^{140}Ho | Er | 69 | | | | | | | | | | | | | | | | | | | | |
| 74 | ^{134}Nd | ^{135}Pm | ^{136}Sm | ^{137}Eu | ^{138}Gd | ^{139}Tb | ^{140}Dy | ^{141}Ho | | Tm | | | | | | | | | | | | | | | | | | | | |
| 75 | ^{135}Nd | ^{136}Pm | ^{137}Sm | ^{138}Eu | ^{139}Gd | ^{140}Tb | ^{141}Dy | ^{142}Ho | ^{143}Er | ^{144}Tm | | | | | | | | | | | | | | | | | | | | |
| 76 | ^{136}Nd | ^{137}Pm | ^{138}Sm | ^{139}Eu | ^{140}Gd | ^{141}Tb | ^{142}Dy | ^{143}Ho | ^{144}Er | ^{145}Tm | 70 | | | | | | | | | | | | | | | | | | | |
| 77 | ^{137}Nd | ^{138}Pm | ^{139}Sm | ^{140}Eu | ^{141}Gd | ^{142}Tb | ^{143}Dy | ^{144}Ho | ^{145}Er | ^{146}Tm | Yb | 71 | | | | | | | | | | | | | | | | | | |
| 78 | ^{138}Nd | ^{139}Pm | ^{140}Sm | ^{141}Eu | ^{142}Gd | ^{143}Tb | ^{144}Dy | ^{145}Ho | ^{146}Er | ^{147}Tm | | Lu | | | | | | | | | | | | | | | | | | |
| 79 | ^{139}Nd | ^{140}Pm | ^{141}Sm | ^{142}Eu | ^{143}Gd | ^{144}Tb | ^{145}Dy | ^{146}Ho | ^{147}Er | ^{148}Tm | ^{149}Yb | ^{150}Lu | 72 | | | | | | | | | | | | | | | | | |
| 80 | ^{140}Nd | ^{141}Pm | ^{142}Sm | ^{143}Eu | ^{144}Gd | ^{145}Tb | ^{146}Dy | ^{147}Ho | ^{148}Er | ^{149}Tm | ^{150}Yb | ^{151}Lu | Hf | 73 | 74 | | | | | | | | | | | | | | | |
| 81 | ^{141}Nd | ^{142}Pm | ^{143}Sm | ^{144}Eu | ^{145}Gd | ^{146}Tb | ^{147}Dy | ^{148}Ho | ^{149}Er | ^{150}Tm | ^{151}Yb | ^{152}Lu | ^{153}Hf | Ta | W | | | | | | | | | | | | | | | |
| 82 | ^{142}Nd | ^{143}Pm | ^{144}Sm | ^{145}Eu | ^{146}Gd | ^{147}Tb | ^{148}Dy | ^{149}Ho | ^{150}Er | ^{151}Tm | ^{152}Yb | ^{153}Lu | ^{154}Hf | ^{155}Ta | ^{156}W | 75 | 76 | | | | | | | | | | | | | |
| 83 | ^{143}Nd | ^{144}Pm | ^{145}Sm | ^{146}Eu | ^{147}Gd | ^{148}Tb | ^{149}Dy | ^{150}Ho | ^{151}Er | ^{152}Tm | ^{153}Yb | ^{154}Lu | ^{155}Hf | ^{156}Ta | ^{157}W | Re | Os | | | | | | | | | | | | | |
| 84 | ^{144}Nd | ^{145}Pm | ^{146}Sm | ^{147}Eu | ^{148}Gd | ^{149}Tb | ^{150}Dy | ^{151}Ho | ^{152}Er | ^{153}Tm | ^{154}Yb | ^{155}Lu | ^{156}Hf | ^{157}Ta | ^{158}W | ^{159}Re | ^{160}Os | 77 | | | | | | | | | | | | |
| 85 | ^{145}Nd | ^{146}Pm | ^{147}Sm | ^{148}Eu | ^{149}Gd | ^{150}Tb | ^{151}Dy | ^{152}Ho | ^{153}Er | ^{154}Tm | ^{155}Yb | ^{156}Lu | ^{157}Hf | ^{158}Ta | ^{159}W | ^{160}Re | ^{161}Os | Ir | 78 | | | | | | | | | | | |
| 86 | ^{146}Nd | ^{147}Pm | ^{148}Sm | ^{149}Eu | ^{150}Gd | ^{151}Tb | ^{152}Dy | ^{153}Ho | ^{154}Er | ^{155}Tm | ^{156}Yb | ^{157}Lu | ^{158}Hf | ^{159}Ta | ^{160}W | ^{161}Re | ^{162}Os | | Pt | | | | | | | | | | | |
| 87 | ^{147}Nd | ^{148}Pm | ^{149}Sm | ^{150}Eu | ^{151}Gd | ^{152}Tb | ^{153}Dy | ^{154}Ho | ^{155}Er | ^{156}Tm | ^{157}Yb | ^{158}Lu | ^{159}Hf | ^{160}Ta | ^{161}W | ^{162}Re | ^{163}Os | | ^{165}Pt | 79 | | | | | | | | | | |
| 88 | ^{148}Nd | ^{149}Pm | ^{150}Sm | ^{151}Eu | ^{152}Gd | ^{153}Tb | ^{154}Dy | ^{155}Ho | ^{156}Er | ^{157}Tm | ^{158}Yb | ^{159}Lu | ^{160}Hf | ^{161}Ta | ^{162}W | ^{163}Re | ^{164}Os | ^{165}Ir | ^{166}Pt | Au | 80 | | | | | | | | | |
| 89 | ^{149}Nd | ^{150}Pm | ^{151}Sm | ^{152}Eu | ^{153}Gd | ^{154}Tb | ^{155}Dy | ^{156}Ho | ^{157}Er | ^{158}Tm | ^{159}Yb | ^{160}Lu | ^{161}Hf | ^{162}Ta | ^{163}W | ^{164}Re | ^{165}Os | ^{166}Ir | ^{167}Pt | | Hg | | | | | | | | | |
| 90 | ^{150}Nd | ^{151}Pm | ^{152}Sm | ^{153}Eu | ^{154}Gd | ^{155}Tb | ^{156}Dy | ^{157}Ho | ^{158}Er | ^{159}Tm | ^{160}Yb | ^{161}Lu | ^{162}Hf | ^{163}Ta | ^{164}W | ^{165}Re | ^{166}Os | ^{167}Ir | ^{168}Pt | | ^{170}Hg | | | | | | | | | |
| 91 | ^{151}Nd | ^{152}Pm | ^{153}Sm | ^{154}Eu | ^{155}Gd | ^{156}Tb | ^{157}Dy | ^{158}Ho | ^{159}Er | ^{160}Tm | ^{161}Yb | ^{162}Lu | ^{163}Hf | ^{164}Ta | ^{165}W | ^{166}Re | ^{167}Os | ^{168}Ir | ^{169}Pt | ^{170}Au | ^{171}Hg | | | | | | | | | |
| 92 | ^{152}Nd | ^{153}Pm | ^{154}Sm | ^{155}Eu | ^{156}Gd | ^{157}Tb | ^{158}Dy | ^{159}Ho | ^{160}Er | ^{161}Tm | ^{162}Yb | ^{163}Lu | ^{164}Hf | ^{165}Ta | ^{166}W | ^{167}Re | ^{168}Os | ^{169}Ir | ^{170}Pt | ^{171}Au | ^{172}Hg | | | | | | | | | |
| 93 | ^{153}Nd | ^{154}Pm | ^{155}Sm | ^{156}Eu | ^{157}Gd | ^{158}Tb | ^{159}Dy | ^{160}Ho | ^{161}Er | ^{162}Tm | ^{163}Yb | ^{164}Lu | ^{165}Hf | ^{166}Ta | ^{167}W | ^{168}Re | ^{169}Os | ^{170}Ir | ^{171}Pt | ^{172}Au | ^{173}Hg | 81 | | | | | | | | |
| 94 | ^{154}Nd | ^{155}Pm | ^{156}Sm | ^{157}Eu | ^{158}Gd | ^{159}Tb | ^{160}Dy | ^{161}Ho | ^{162}Er | ^{163}Tm | ^{164}Yb | ^{165}Lu | ^{166}Hf | ^{167}Ta | ^{168}W | ^{169}Re | ^{170}Os | ^{171}Ir | ^{172}Pt | ^{173}Au | ^{174}Hg | Tl | 82 | | | | | | | |
| 95 | ^{155}Nd | ^{156}Pm | ^{157}Sm | ^{158}Eu | ^{159}Gd | ^{160}Tb | ^{161}Dy | ^{162}Ho | ^{163}Er | ^{164}Tm | ^{165}Yb | ^{166}Lu | ^{167}Hf | ^{168}Ta | ^{169}W | ^{170}Re | ^{171}Os | ^{172}Ir | ^{173}Pt | ^{174}Au | ^{175}Hg | ^{176}Tl | Pb | | | | | | | |
| 96 | ^{156}Nd | ^{157}Pm | ^{158}Sm | ^{159}Eu | ^{160}Gd | ^{161}Tb | ^{162}Dy | ^{163}Ho | ^{164}Er | ^{165}Tm | ^{166}Yb | ^{167}Lu | ^{168}Hf | ^{169}Ta | ^{170}W | ^{171}Re | ^{172}Os | ^{173}Ir | ^{174}Pt | ^{175}Au | ^{176}Hg | ^{177}Tl | ^{178}Pb | | | | | | | |
| 97 | ^{157}Nd | ^{158}Pm | ^{159}Sm | ^{160}Eu | ^{161}Gd | ^{162}Tb | ^{163}Dy | ^{164}Ho | ^{165}Er | ^{166}Tm | ^{167}Yb | ^{168}Lu | ^{169}Hf | ^{170}Ta | ^{171}W | ^{172}Re | ^{173}Os | ^{174}Ir | ^{175}Pt | ^{176}Au | ^{177}Hg | ^{178}Tl | ^{179}Pb | | | | | | | |
| 98 | ^{158}Nd | ^{159}Pm | ^{160}Sm | ^{161}Eu | ^{162}Gd | ^{163}Tb | ^{164}Dy | ^{165}Ho | ^{166}Er | ^{167}Tm | ^{168}Yb | ^{169}Lu | ^{170}Hf | ^{171}Ta | ^{172}W | ^{173}Re | ^{174}Os | ^{175}Ir | ^{176}Pt | ^{177}Au | ^{178}Hg | ^{179}Tl | ^{180}Pb | | | | | | | |
| 99 | ^{159}Nd | ^{160}Pm | ^{161}Sm | ^{162}Eu | ^{163}Gd | ^{164}Tb | ^{165}Dy | ^{166}Ho | ^{167}Er | ^{168}Tm | ^{169}Yb | ^{170}Lu | ^{171}Hf | ^{172}Ta | ^{173}W | ^{174}Re | ^{175}Os | ^{176}Ir | ^{177}Pt | ^{178}Au | ^{179}Hg | ^{180}Tl | ^{181}Pb | 83 | | | | | | |
| 100 | ^{160}Nd | ^{161}Pm | ^{162}Sm | ^{163}Eu | ^{164}Gd | ^{165}Tb | ^{166}Dy | ^{167}Ho | ^{168}Er | ^{169}Tm | ^{170}Yb | ^{171}Lu | ^{172}Hf | ^{173}Ta | ^{174}W | ^{175}Re | ^{176}Os | ^{177}Ir | ^{178}Pt | ^{179}Au | ^{180}Hg | ^{181}Tl | ^{182}Pb | Bi | 84 | | | | | |
| 101 | ^{161}Nd | ^{162}Pm | ^{163}Sm | ^{164}Eu | ^{165}Gd | ^{166}Tb | ^{167}Dy | ^{168}Ho | ^{169}Er | ^{170}Tm | ^{171}Yb | ^{172}Lu | ^{173}Hf | ^{174}Ta | ^{175}W | ^{176}Re | ^{177}Os | ^{178}Ir | ^{179}Pt | ^{180}Au | ^{181}Hg | ^{182}Tl | ^{183}Pb | ^{184}Bi | Po | 85 | | | | |
| 102 | ^{162}Nd | ^{163}Pm | ^{164}Sm | ^{165}Eu | ^{166}Gd | ^{167}Tb | ^{168}Dy | ^{169}Ho | ^{170}Er | ^{171}Tm | ^{172}Yb | ^{173}Lu | ^{174}Hf | ^{175}Ta | ^{176}W | ^{177}Re | ^{178}Os | ^{179}Ir | ^{180}Pt | ^{181}Au | ^{182}Hg | ^{183}Tl | ^{184}Pb | ^{185}Bi | ^{186}Po | At | | | | |
| 103 | ^{163}Nd | ^{164}Pm | ^{165}Sm | ^{166}Eu | ^{167}Gd | ^{168}Tb | ^{169}Dy | ^{170}Ho | ^{171}Er | ^{172}Tm | ^{173}Yb | ^{174}Lu | ^{175}Hf | ^{176}Ta | ^{177}W | ^{178}Re | ^{179}Os | ^{180}Ir | ^{181}Pt | ^{182}Au | ^{183}Hg | ^{184}Tl | ^{185}Pb | ^{186}Bi | ^{187}Po | ^{188}At | | | | |
| | 104 | ^{165}Pm | ^{166}Sm | ^{167}Eu | ^{168}Gd | ^{169}Tb | ^{170}Dy | ^{171}Ho | ^{172}Er | ^{173}Tm | ^{174}Yb | ^{175}Lu | ^{176}Hf | ^{177}Ta | ^{178}W | ^{179}Re | ^{180}Os | ^{181}Ir | ^{182}Pt | ^{183}Au | ^{184}Hg | ^{185}Tl | ^{186}Pb | ^{187}Bi | ^{188}Po | | | | | |
| | 105 | ^{166}Pm | ^{167}Sm | ^{168}Eu | ^{169}Gd | ^{170}Tb | ^{171}Dy | ^{172}Ho | ^{173}Er | ^{174}Tm | ^{175}Yb | ^{176}Lu | ^{177}Hf | ^{178}Ta | ^{179}W | ^{180}Re | ^{181}Os | ^{182}Ir | ^{183}Pt | ^{184}Au | ^{185}Hg | ^{186}Tl | ^{187}Pb | ^{188}Bi | ^{189}Po | ^{190}At | 86 | | | |
| | | 106 | ^{168}Sm | ^{169}Eu | ^{170}Gd | ^{171}Tb | ^{172}Dy | ^{173}Ho | ^{174}Er | ^{175}Tm | ^{176}Yb | ^{177}Lu | ^{178}Hf | ^{179}Ta | ^{180}W | ^{181}Re | ^{182}Os | ^{183}Ir | ^{184}Pt | ^{185}Au | ^{186}Hg | ^{187}Tl | ^{188}Pb | ^{189}Bi | ^{190}Po | ^{191}At | Rn | | | |
| | | | 107 | ^{170}Eu | ^{171}Gd | ^{172}Tb | ^{173}Dy | ^{174}Ho | ^{175}Er | ^{176}Tm | ^{177}Yb | ^{178}Lu | ^{179}Hf | ^{180}Ta | ^{181}W | ^{182}Re | ^{183}Os | ^{184}Ir | ^{185}Pt | ^{186}Au | ^{187}Hg | ^{188}Tl | ^{189}Pb | ^{190}Bi | ^{191}Po | ^{192}At | ^{193}Rn | | | |
| | | | | 108 | ^{172}Gd | ^{173}Tb | ^{174}Dy | ^{175}Ho | ^{176}Er | ^{177}Tm | ^{178}Yb | ^{179}Lu | ^{180}Hf | ^{181}Ta | ^{182}W | ^{183}Re | ^{184}Os | ^{185}Ir | ^{186}Pt | ^{187}Au | ^{188}Hg | ^{189}Tl | ^{190}Pb | ^{191}Bi | ^{192}Po | ^{193}At | ^{194}Rn | 87 | | |
| | | | | | 109 | ^{174}Tb | ^{175}Dy | ^{176}Ho | ^{177}Er | ^{178}Tm | ^{179}Yb | ^{180}Lu | ^{181}Hf | ^{182}Ta | ^{183}W | ^{184}Re | ^{185}Os | ^{186}Ir | ^{187}Pt | ^{188}Au | ^{189}Hg | ^{190}Tl | ^{191}Pb | ^{192}Bi | ^{193}Po | ^{194}At | ^{195}Rn | Fr | | |
| | | | | | | 110 | ^{176}Dy | ^{177}Ho | ^{178}Er | ^{179}Tm | ^{180}Yb | ^{181}Lu | ^{182}Hf | ^{183}Ta | ^{184}W | ^{185}Re | ^{186}Os | ^{187}Ir | ^{188}Pt | ^{189}Au | ^{190}Hg | ^{191}Tl | ^{192}Pb | ^{193}Bi | ^{194}Po | ^{195}At | ^{196}Rn | ^{197}Fr | | |
| | | | | | | | 111 | ^{178}Ho | ^{179}Er | ^{180}Tm | ^{181}Yb | ^{182}Lu | ^{183}Hf | ^{184}Ta | ^{185}W | ^{186}Re | ^{187}Os | ^{188}Ir | ^{189}Pt | ^{190}Au | ^{191}Hg | ^{192}Tl | ^{193}Pb | ^{194}Bi | ^{195}Po | ^{196}At | ^{197}Rn | ^{198}Fr | 88 | |
| | | | | | | | | 112 | ^{180}Er | ^{181}Tm | ^{182}Yb | ^{183}Lu | ^{184}Hf | ^{185}Ta | ^{186}W | ^{187}Re | ^{188}Os | ^{189}Ir | ^{190}Pt | ^{191}Au | ^{192}Hg | ^{193}Tl | ^{194}Pb | ^{195}Bi | ^{196}Po | ^{197}At | ^{198}Rn | ^{199}Fr | Ra | 89 |
| | | | | | | | | | 113 | ^{182}Tm | ^{183}Yb | ^{184}Lu | ^{185}Hf | ^{186}Ta | ^{187}W | ^{188}Re | ^{189}Os | ^{190}Ir | ^{191}Pt | ^{192}Au | ^{193}Hg | ^{194}Tl | ^{195}Pb | ^{196}Bi | ^{197}Po | ^{198}At | ^{199}Rn | ^{200}Fr | ^{201}Ra | Ac |
| | | | | | | | | | 114 | ^{183}Tm | ^{184}Yb | ^{185}Lu | ^{186}Hf | ^{187}Ta | ^{188}W | ^{189}Re | ^{190}Os | ^{191}Ir | ^{192}Pt | ^{193}Au | ^{194}Hg | ^{195}Tl | ^{196}Pb | ^{197}Bi | ^{198}Po | ^{199}At | ^{200}Rn | ^{201}Fr | ^{202}Ra | ^{203}Ac |
| | | | | | | | | | | 115 | ^{185}Yb | ^{186}Lu | ^{187}Hf | ^{188}Ta | ^{189}W | ^{190}Re | ^{191}Os | ^{192}Ir | ^{193}Pt | ^{194}Au | ^{195}Hg | ^{196}Tl | ^{197}Pb | ^{198}Bi | ^{199}Po | ^{200}At | ^{201}Rn | ^{202}Fr | ^{203}Ra | ^{204}Ac |
| | | | | | | | | | | 116 | ^{186}Yb | ^{187}Lu | ^{188}Hf | ^{189}Ta | ^{190}W | ^{191}Re | ^{192}Os | ^{193}Ir | ^{194}Pt | ^{195}Au | ^{196}Hg | ^{197}Tl | ^{198}Pb | ^{199}Bi | ^{200}Po | ^{201}At | ^{202}Rn | ^{203}Fr | ^{204}Ra | ^{205}Ac |
| | | | | | | | | | | 117 | ^{187}Yb | ^{188}Lu | ^{189}Hf | ^{190}Ta | ^{191}W | ^{192}Re | ^{193}Os | ^{194}Ir | ^{195}Pt | ^{196}Au | ^{197}Hg | ^{198}Tl | ^{199}Pb | ^{200}Bi | ^{201}Po | ^{202}At | ^{203}Rn | ^{204}Fr | ^{205}Ra | ^{206}Ac |
| | | | | | | | | | | | 118 | ^{189}Lu | ^{190}Hf | ^{191}Ta | ^{192}W | ^{193}Re | ^{194}Os | ^{195}Ir | ^{196}Pt | ^{197}Au | ^{198}Hg | ^{199}Tl | ^{200}Pb | ^{201}Bi | ^{202}Po | ^{203}At | ^{204}Rn | ^{205}Fr | ^{206}Ra | ^{207}Ac |
| | | | | | | | | | | | 119 | ^{190}Lu | ^{191}Hf | ^{192}Ta | ^{193}W | ^{194}Re | ^{195}Os | ^{196}Ir | ^{197}Pt | ^{198}Au | ^{199}Hg | ^{200}Tl | ^{201}Pb | ^{202}Bi | ^{203}Po | ^{204}At | ^{205}Rn | ^{206}Fr | ^{207}Ra | ^{208}Ac |
| | | | | | | | | | | | | 120 | ^{192}Hf | ^{193}Ta | ^{194}W | ^{195}Re | ^{196}Os | ^{197}Ir | ^{198}Pt | ^{199}Au | ^{200}Hg | ^{201}Tl | ^{202}Pb | ^{203}Bi | ^{204}Po | ^{205}At | ^{206}Rn | ^{207}Fr | ^{208}Ra | ^{209}Ac |
| | | | | | | | | | | | | | 121 | ^{194}Ta | ^{195}W | ^{196}Re | ^{197}Os | ^{198}Ir | ^{199}Pt | ^{200}Au | ^{201}Hg | ^{202}Tl | ^{203}Pb | ^{204}Bi | ^{205}Po | ^{206}At | ^{207}Rn | ^{208}Fr | ^{209}Ra | ^{210}Ac |
| | | | | | | | | | | | | | | 122 | ^{196}W | ^{197}Re | ^{198}Os | ^{199}Ir | ^{200}Pt | ^{201}Au | ^{202}Hg | ^{203}Tl | ^{204}Pb | ^{205}Bi | ^{206}Po | ^{207}At | ^{208}Rn | ^{209}Fr | ^{210}Ra | ^{211}Ac |
| | | | | | | | | | | | | | | 123 | ^{197}W | ^{198}Re | ^{199}Os | ^{200}Ir | ^{201}Pt | ^{202}Au | ^{203}Hg | ^{204}Tl | ^{205}Pb | ^{206}Bi | ^{207}Po | ^{208}At | ^{209}Rn | ^{210}Fr | ^{211}Ra | ^{212}Ac |
| | | | | | | | | | | | | | | | 124 | ^{199}Re | ^{200}Os | ^{201}Ir | ^{202}Pt | ^{203}Au | ^{204}Hg | ^{205}Tl | ^{206}Pb | ^{207}Bi | ^{208}Po | ^{209}At | ^{210}Rn | ^{211}Fr | ^{212}Ra | ^{213}Ac |
| | | | | | | | | | | | | | | | | 125 | ^{201}Os | ^{202}Ir | ^{203}Pt | ^{204}Au | ^{205}Hg | ^{206}Tl | ^{207}Pb | ^{208}Bi | ^{209}Po | ^{210}At | ^{211}Rn | ^{212}Fr | ^{213}Ra | ^{214}Ac |
| | | | | | | | | | | | | | | | | 126 | ^{202}Os | ^{203}Ir | ^{204}Pt | ^{205}Au | ^{206}Hg | ^{207}Tl | ^{208}Pb | ^{209}Bi | ^{210}Po | ^{211}At | ^{212}Rn | ^{213}Fr | ^{214}Ra | ^{215}Ac |
| | | | | | | | | | | | | | | | | 127 | ^{203}Os | ^{204}Ir | ^{205}Pt | ^{206}Au | ^{207}Hg | ^{208}Tl | ^{209}Pb | ^{210}Bi | ^{211}Po | ^{212}At | ^{213}Rn | ^{214}Fr | ^{215}Ra | ^{216}Ac |
| | | | | | | | | | | | | | | | | | 128 | ^{205}Ir | ^{206}Pt | ^{207}Au | ^{208}Hg | ^{209}Tl | ^{210}Pb | ^{211}Bi | ^{212}Po | ^{213}At | ^{214}Rn | ^{215}Fr | ^{216}Ra | ^{217}Ac |
| | | | | | | | | | | | | | | | | | | 129 | ^{207}Pt | ^{208}Au | ^{209}Hg | ^{210}Tl | ^{211}Pb | ^{212}Bi | ^{213}Po | ^{214}At | ^{215}Rn | ^{216}Fr | ^{217}Ra | ^{218}Ac |
| | | | | | | | | | | | | | | | | | | 130 | ^{208}Pt | ^{209}Au | ^{210}Hg | ^{211}Tl | ^{212}Pb | ^{213}Bi | ^{214}Po | ^{215}At | ^{216}Rn | ^{217}Fr | ^{218}Ra | ^{219}Ac |
| | | | | | | | | | | | | | | | | | | | 131 | ^{210}Au | ^{211}Hg | ^{212}Tl | ^{213}Pb | ^{214}Bi | ^{215}Po | ^{216}At | ^{217}Rn | ^{218}Fr | ^{219}Ra | ^{220}Ac |
| | | | | | | | | | | | | | | | | | | | | 132 | ^{212}Hg | ^{213}Tl | ^{214}Pb | ^{215}Bi | ^{216}Po | ^{217}At | ^{218}Rn | ^{219}Fr | ^{220}Ra | ^{221}Ac |
| | | | | | | | | | | | | | | | | | | | | 133 | ^{213}Hg | ^{214}Tl | ^{215}Pb | ^{216}Bi | ^{217}Po | ^{218}At | ^{219}Rn | ^{220}Fr | ^{221}Ra | ^{222}Ac |
| | | | | | | | | | | | | | | | | | | | | 134 | ^{214}Hg | ^{215}Tl | ^{216}Pb | ^{217}Bi | ^{218}Po | ^{219}At | ^{220}Rn | ^{221}Fr | ^{222}Ra | ^{223}Ac |
| | | | | | | | | | | | | | | | | | | | | 135 | ^{215}Hg | ^{216}Tl | ^{217}Pb | ^{218}Bi | ^{219}Po | ^{220}At | ^{221}Rn | ^{222}Fr | ^{223}Ra | ^{224}Ac |
| | | | | | | | | | | | | | | | | | | | | 136 | ^{216}Hg | ^{217}Tl | ^{218}Pb | ^{219}Bi | ^{220}Po | ^{221}At | ^{222}Rn | ^{223}Fr | ^{224}Ra | ^{225}Ac |
| | | | | | | | | | | | | | | | | | | | | | 137 | | ^{219}Pb | ^{220}Bi | ^{221}Po | ^{222}At | ^{223}Rn | ^{224}Fr | ^{225}Ra | ^{226}Ac |
| | | | | | | | | | | | | | | | | | | | | | | 138 | ^{220}Pb | ^{221}Bi | ^{222}Po | ^{223}At | ^{224}Rn | ^{225}Fr | ^{226}Ra | ^{227}Ac |
| | | | | | | | | | | | | | | | | | | | | | | | 139 | ^{222}Bi | ^{223}Po | ^{224}At | ^{225}Rn | ^{226}Fr | ^{227}Ra | ^{228}Ac |
| | | | | | | | | | | | | | | | | | | | | | | | 140 | ^{223}Bi | ^{224}Po | ^{225}At | ^{226}Rn | ^{227}Fr | ^{228}Ra | ^{229}Ac |
| | | | | | | | | | | | | | | | | | | | | | | | 141 | ^{224}Bi | ^{225}Po | ^{226}At | ^{227}Rn | ^{228}Fr | ^{229}Ra | ^{230}Ac |
| | | | | | | | | | | | | | | | | | | | | | | | | 142 | ^{226}Po | ^{227}At | ^{228}Rn | ^{229}Fr | ^{230}Ra | ^{231}Ac |
| | | | | | | | | | | | | | | | | | | | | | | | | 143 | ^{227}Po | ^{228}At | ^{229}Rn | ^{230}Fr | ^{231}Ra | ^{232}Ac |
| | | | | | | | | | | | | | | | | | | | | | | | | | 144 | ^{229}At | ^{230}Rn | ^{231}Fr | ^{232}Ra | ^{233}Ac |
| | | | | | | | | | | | | | | | | | | | | | | | | | 145 | ^{230}At | ^{231}Rn | ^{232}Fr | ^{233}Ra | ^{234}Ac |
| | | | | | | | | | | | | | | | | | | | | | | | | | | 146 | ^{232}Rn | ^{233}Fr | ^{234}Ra | ^{235}Ac |
| | | | | | | | | | | | | | | | | | | | | | | | | | | | | 147 | | ^{236}Ac |
| | | | | | | | | | | | | | | | | | | | | | | | | | | | | | 148 | |

== Isotopes for elements 90-118 ==
← Previous | Next →Go to Unitized table (all elements)Go to Periodic table

Half-lives (example: Gd)
| ^{145}Gd | < 1 day |
| ^{149}Gd | 1–10 days |
| ^{146}Gd | 10–100 days |
| ^{153}Gd | 100 days–10 a |
| ^{148}Gd | 10–10,000 a |
| ^{150}Gd | 10 ka–700 Ma |
| ^{152}Gd | > 700 Ma |
| ^{158}Gd | Stable |

| Z → | 90 | | | | | | | | | | | | | | | | | | | | | | | | | | | | |
| n ↓ | Th | | | | | | | | | | | | | | | | | | | | | | | | | | | | |
|---|---|---|---|---|---|---|---|---|---|---|---|---|---|---|---|---|---|---|---|---|---|---|---|---|---|---|---|---|---|
| 117 | ^{207}Th | 91 | | | | | | | | | | | | | | | | | | | | | | | | | | | |
| 118 | ^{208}Th | Pa | | | | | | | | | | | | | | | | | | | | | | | | | | | |
| 119 | ^{209}Th | ^{210}Pa | | | | | | | | | | | | | | | | | | | | | | | | | | | |
| 120 | ^{210}Th | ^{211}Pa | 92 | | | | | | | | | | | | | | | | | | | | | | | | | | |
| 121 | ^{211}Th | ^{212}Pa | U | | | | | | | | | | | | | | | | | | | | | | | | | | |
| 122 | ^{212}Th | ^{213}Pa | ^{214}U | | | | | | | | | | | | | | | | | | | | | | | | | | |
| 123 | ^{213}Th | ^{214}Pa | ^{215}U | | | | | | | | | | | | | | | | | | | | | | | | | | |
| 124 | ^{214}Th | ^{215}Pa | ^{216}U | 93 | | | | | | | | | | | | | | | | | | | | | | | | | |
| 125 | ^{215}Th | ^{216}Pa | ^{217}U | Np | 94 | | | | | | | | | | | | | | | | | | | | | | | | |
| 126 | ^{216}Th | ^{217}Pa | ^{218}U | ^{219}Np | Pu | 95 | | | | | | | | | | | | | | | | | | | | | | | |
| 127 | ^{217}Th | ^{218}Pa | ^{219}U | ^{220}Np | | Am | | | | | | | | | | | | | | | | | | | | | | | |
| 128 | ^{218}Th | ^{219}Pa | | | | | | | | | | | | | | | | | | | | | | | | | | | |
| 129 | ^{219}Th | ^{220}Pa | ^{221}U | ^{222}Np | | | | | | | | | | | | | | | | | | | | | | | | | |
| 130 | ^{220}Th | ^{221}Pa | ^{222}U | ^{223}Np | | | | | | | | | | | | | | | | | | | | | | | | | |
| 131 | ^{221}Th | ^{222}Pa | ^{223}U | ^{224}Np | | | 96 | 97 | | | | | | | | | | | | | | | | | | | | | |
| 132 | ^{222}Th | ^{223}Pa | ^{224}U | ^{225}Np | ^{226}Pu | | Cm | Bk | | | | | | | | | | | | | | | | | | | | | |
| 133 | ^{223}Th | ^{224}Pa | ^{225}U | ^{226}Np | ^{227}Pu | | | | | | | | | | | | | | | | | | | | | | | | |
| 134 | ^{224}Th | ^{225}Pa | ^{226}U | ^{227}Np | ^{228}Pu | ^{229}Am | | | | | | | | | | | | | | | | | | | | | | | |
| 135 | ^{225}Th | ^{226}Pa | ^{227}U | ^{228}Np | ^{229}Pu | ^{230}Am | | | | | | | | | | | | | | | | | | | | | | | |
| 136 | ^{226}Th | ^{227}Pa | ^{228}U | ^{229}Np | ^{230}Pu | | | ^{233}Bk | | | | | | | | | | | | | | | | | | | | | |
| 137 | ^{227}Th | ^{228}Pa | ^{229}U | ^{230}Np | ^{231}Pu | ^{232}Am | ^{233}Cm | ^{234}Bk | 98 | | | | | | | | | | | | | | | | | | | | |
| 138 | ^{228}Th | ^{229}Pa | ^{230}U | ^{231}Np | ^{232}Pu | ^{233}Am | ^{234}Cm | | Cf | 99 | | | | | | | | | | | | | | | | | | | |
| 139 | ^{229}Th | ^{230}Pa | ^{231}U | ^{232}Np | ^{233}Pu | ^{234}Am | ^{235}Cm | ^{236}Bk | ^{237}Cf | Es | 100 | | | | | | | | | | | | | | | | | | |
| 140 | ^{230}Th | ^{231}Pa | ^{232}U | ^{233}Np | ^{234}Pu | ^{235}Am | ^{236}Cm | | ^{238}Cf | | Fm | | | | | | | | | | | | | | | | | | |
| 141 | ^{231}Th | ^{232}Pa | ^{233}U | ^{234}Np | ^{235}Pu | ^{236}Am | ^{237}Cm | ^{238}Bk | ^{239}Cf | ^{240}Es | ^{241}Fm | 101 | | | | | | | | | | | | | | | | | |
| 142 | ^{232}Th | ^{233}Pa | ^{234}U | ^{235}Np | ^{236}Pu | ^{237}Am | ^{238}Cm | | ^{240}Cf | ^{241}Es | ^{242}Fm | Md | | | | | | | | | | | | | | | | | |
| 143 | ^{233}Th | ^{234}Pa | ^{235}U | ^{236}Np | ^{237}Pu | ^{238}Am | ^{239}Cm | ^{240}Bk | ^{241}Cf | ^{242}Es | ^{243}Fm | ^{244}Md | | | | | | | | | | | | | | | | | |
| 144 | ^{234}Th | ^{235}Pa | ^{236}U | ^{237}Np | ^{238}Pu | ^{239}Am | ^{240}Cm | ^{241}Bk | ^{242}Cf | ^{243}Es | ^{244}Fm | ^{245}Md | 102 | | | | | | | | | | | | | | | | |
| 145 | ^{235}Th | ^{236}Pa | ^{237}U | ^{238}Np | ^{239}Pu | ^{240}Am | ^{241}Cm | ^{242}Bk | ^{243}Cf | ^{244}Es | ^{245}Fm | ^{246}Md | No | | | | | | | | | | | | | | | | |
| 146 | ^{236}Th | ^{237}Pa | ^{238}U | ^{239}Np | ^{240}Pu | ^{241}Am | ^{242}Cm | ^{243}Bk | ^{244}Cf | ^{245}Es | ^{246}Fm | ^{247}Md | | 103 | 104 | | | | | | | | | | | | | | |
| 147 | ^{237}Th | ^{238}Pa | ^{239}U | ^{240}Np | ^{241}Pu | ^{242}Am | ^{243}Cm | ^{244}Bk | ^{245}Cf | ^{246}Es | ^{247}Fm | ^{248}Md | ^{249}No | Lr | Rf | | | | | | | | | | | | | | |
| 148 | ^{238}Th | ^{239}Pa | ^{240}U | ^{241}Np | ^{242}Pu | ^{243}Am | ^{244}Cm | ^{245}Bk | ^{246}Cf | ^{247}Es | ^{248}Fm | ^{249}Md | ^{250}No | ^{251}Lr | ^{252}Rf | 105 | | | | | | | | | | | | | |
| 149 | | | ^{241}U | ^{242}Np | ^{243}Pu | ^{244}Am | ^{245}Cm | ^{246}Bk | ^{247}Cf | ^{248}Es | ^{249}Fm | ^{250}Md | ^{251}No | ^{252}Lr | ^{253}Rf | Db | | | | | | | | | | | | | |
| | 150 | | ^{242}U | ^{243}Np | ^{244}Pu | ^{245}Am | ^{246}Cm | ^{247}Bk | ^{248}Cf | ^{249}Es | ^{250}Fm | ^{251}Md | ^{252}No | ^{253}Lr | ^{254}Rf | ^{255}Db | 106 | | | | | | | | | | | | |
| | | 151 | | ^{244}Np | ^{245}Pu | ^{246}Am | ^{247}Cm | ^{248}Bk | ^{249}Cf | ^{250}Es | ^{251}Fm | ^{252}Md | ^{253}No | ^{254}Lr | ^{255}Rf | ^{256}Db | Sg | 107 | | | | | | | | | | | |
| | | | 152 | | ^{246}Pu | ^{247}Am | ^{248}Cm | ^{249}Bk | ^{250}Cf | ^{251}Es | ^{252}Fm | ^{253}Md | ^{254}No | ^{255}Lr | ^{256}Rf | ^{257}Db | ^{258}Sg | Bh | | | | | | | | | | | |
| | | | | 153 | ^{247}Pu | | ^{249}Cm | ^{250}Bk | ^{251}Cf | ^{252}Es | ^{253}Fm | ^{254}Md | ^{255}No | ^{256}Lr | ^{257}Rf | ^{258}Db | ^{259}Sg | ^{260}Bh | 108 | | | | | | | | | | |
| | | | | | 154 | | ^{250}Cm | ^{251}Bk | ^{252}Cf | ^{253}Es | ^{254}Fm | ^{255}Md | ^{256}No | ^{257}Lr | ^{258}Rf | ^{259}Db | ^{260}Sg | ^{261}Bh | Hs | 109 | | | | | | | | | |
| | | | | | | 155 | ^{251}Cm | ^{252}Bk | ^{253}Cf | ^{254}Es | ^{255}Fm | ^{256}Md | ^{257}No | ^{258}Lr | ^{259}Rf | ^{260}Db | ^{261}Sg | ^{262}Bh | ^{263}Hs | Mt | 110 | | | | | | | | |
| | | | | | | 156 | | ^{253}Bk | ^{254}Cf | ^{255}Es | ^{256}Fm | ^{257}Md | ^{258}No | ^{259}Lr | ^{260}Rf | ^{261}Db | ^{262}Sg | | ^{264}Hs | | Ds | | | | | | | | |
| | | | | | | | 157 | | ^{255}Cf | ^{256}Es | ^{257}Fm | ^{258}Md | ^{259}No | ^{260}Lr | ^{261}Rf | ^{262}Db | ^{263}Sg | ^{264}Bh | ^{265}Hs | ^{266}Mt | ^{267}Ds | | | | | | | | |
| | | | | | | | | 158 | ^{256}Cf | ^{257}Es | ^{258}Fm | ^{259}Md | ^{260}No | ^{261}Lr | ^{262}Rf | ^{263}Db | ^{264}Sg | ^{265}Bh | ^{266}Hs | | | | | | | | | | |
| | | | | | | | | | 159 | | ^{259}Fm | ^{260}Md | | ^{262}Lr | ^{263}Rf | | ^{265}Sg | ^{266}Bh | ^{267}Hs | ^{268}Mt | ^{269}Ds | 111 | | | | | | | |
| | | | | | | | | | | 160 | ^{260}Fm | | ^{262}No | | | | ^{266}Sg | ^{267}Bh | ^{268}Hs | | ^{270}Ds | Rg | | | | | | | |
| | | | | | | | | | | | 161 | | | ^{264}Lr | ^{265}Rf | ^{266}Db | ^{267}Sg | | ^{269}Hs | ^{270}Mt | ^{271}Ds | ^{272}Rg | | | | | | | |
| | | | | | | | | | | | | 162 | | | | ^{267}Db | ^{268}Sg | | ^{270}Hs | | | | 112 | | | | | | |
| | | | | | | | | | | | | | 163 | ^{266}Lr | ^{267}Rf | ^{268}Db | ^{269}Sg | ^{270}Bh | ^{271}Hs | | ^{273}Ds | ^{274}Rg | Cn | 113 | | | | | |
| | | | | | | | | | | | | | | 164 | | | | ^{271}Bh | ^{272}Hs | | | | | Nh | | | | | |
| | | | | | | | | | | | | | | | 165 | ^{270}Db | ^{271}Sg | ^{272}Bh | ^{273}Hs | ^{274}Mt | ^{275}Ds | | ^{277}Cn | ^{278}Nh | | | | | |
| | | | | | | | | | | | | | | | | 166 | | | | ^{275}Mt | ^{276}Ds | | | | | | | | |
| | | | | | | | | | | | | | | | | 167 | | ^{274}Bh | ^{275}Hs | ^{276}Mt | ^{277}Ds | ^{278}Rg | | | | | | | |
| | | | | | | | | | | | | | | | | | 168 | | | ^{277}Mt | | ^{279}Rg | ^{280}Cn | | 114 | | | | |
| | | | | | | | | | | | | | | | | | 169 | | ^{277}Hs | ^{278}Mt | ^{279}Ds | ^{280}Rg | ^{281}Cn | ^{282}Nh | Fl | 115 | | | |
| | | | | | | | | | | | | | | | | | 170 | | | | ^{280}Ds | ^{281}Rg | ^{282}Cn | ^{283}Nh | ^{284}Fl | Mc | 116 | | |
| | | | | | | | | | | | | | | | | | 171 | | | | ^{281}Ds | ^{282}Rg | ^{283}Cn | ^{284}Nh | ^{285}Fl | ^{286}Mc | Lv | | |
| | | | | | | | | | | | | | | | | | | 172 | | | | | ^{284}Cn | ^{285}Nh | ^{286}Fl | ^{287}Mc | ^{288}Lv | 117 | |
| | | | | | | | | | | | | | | | | | | | 173 | | | | ^{285}Cn | ^{286}Nh | ^{287}Fl | ^{288}Mc | ^{289}Lv | Ts | 118 |
| | | | | | | | | | | | | | | | | | | | | 174 | | | | | ^{288}Fl | ^{289}Mc | ^{290}Lv | | Og |
| | | | | | | | | | | | | | | | | | | | | | 175 | | | | ^{289}Fl | ^{290}Mc | ^{291}Lv | | |
| | | | | | | | | | | | | | | | | | | | | | | 176 | | | | | ^{292}Lv | ^{293}Ts | ^{294}Og |
| | | | | | | | | | | | | | | | | | | | | | | | 177 | | | | ^{293}Lv | ^{294}Ts | |
