= Isotopes of nihonium =

Nuclides with atomic number of 113 but with different mass numbers

Isotopes of nihonium (_{113}Nh)
Main isotopes			Decay	
Isotope	abundance	half-life (t_{1/2})	mode	product
^{278}Nh	synth	2.0 ms	α	^{274}Rg
^{282}Nh	synth	61 ms	α	^{278}Rg
^{283}Nh	synth	123 ms	α	^{279}Rg
^{284}Nh	synth	0.90 s	α	^{280}Rg
^{284}Nh	synth	0.90 s	ε	^{284}Cn
^{285}Nh	synth	2.1 s	α	^{281}Rg
^{285}Nh	synth	2.1 s	SF	–
^{286}Nh	synth	9.5 s	α	^{282}Rg
^{287}Nh	synth	5.5 s?	α	^{283}Rg
^{290}Nh	synth	2 s?	α	^{286}Rg

Nihonium (_{113}Nh) is a synthetic element. Being synthetic, a standard atomic weight cannot be given and like all artificial elements, it has no stable isotopes. The first isotope to be synthesized was ^{284}Nh as a decay product of ^{288}Mc in 2003. The first isotope to be directly synthesized was ^{278}Nh in 2004. There are 6 known radioisotopes from ^{278}Nh to ^{286}Nh, along with the unconfirmed ^{287}Nh and ^{290}Nh. The longest-lived isotope is ^{286}Nh with a half-life of 9.5 seconds.

== List of isotopes ==
Nuclide	Z	N	Isotopic mass (Da) (Note: ( ) – Uncertainty (1σ) is given in concise form in parentheses after the corresponding last digits.) (Note: # – Atomic mass marked #: value and uncertainty derived not from purely experimental data, but at least partly from trends from the Mass Surface (TMS).)	Discovery year	Half-life	Decay mode (Note: Modes of decay: EC: / Electron capture)	Daughter isotope	Spin and parity
^{278}Nh	113	165	278.17073(24)#	2004	2.0+2.7 −0.7 ms [2.3(13) ms]	α	^{274}Rg	
^{282}Nh	113	169	282.17577(43)#	2007	61+73 −22 ms	α	^{278}Rg	
^{283}Nh (Note: Not directly synthesized, occurs as decay product of ^{287}Mc)	113	170	283.17667(47)#	2004	123+80 −35 ms	α	^{279}Rg	
^{284}Nh (Note: Not directly synthesized, occurs as decay product of ^{288}Mc)	113	171	284.17884(57)#	2004	0.90+0.07 −0.06 s	α (≥99%)	^{280}Rg	
^{284}Nh	113	171	284.17884(57)#	2004	0.90+0.07 −0.06 s	EC (≤1%)	^{284}Cn	
^{285}Nh (Note: Not directly synthesized, occurs in decay chain of ^{293}Ts)	113	172	285.18011(83)#	2010	2.1+0.6 −0.3 s	α (82%)	^{281}Rg	
^{285}Nh	113	172	285.18011(83)#	2010	2.1+0.6 −0.3 s	SF (18%)	(various)	
^{286}Nh (Note: Not directly synthesized, occurs in decay chain of ^{294}Ts)	113	173	286.18246(63)#	2010	9.5+6.3 −2.7 s [12(5) s]	α	^{282}Rg	
^{287}Nh (Note: Not directly synthesized, occurs in decay chain of ^{287}Fl; unconfirmed)	113	174	287.18406(76)#	(2017)	5.5 s	α	^{283}Rg	
^{290}Nh (Note: Not directly synthesized, occurs in decay chain of ^{290}Fl and ^{294}Lv; unconfirmed)	113	177	290.19143(50)#	(2016)	2.0+9.6 −0.9 s [8(6) s]	α	^{286}Rg	
^{290}Nh	113	177	290.19143(50)#	(2016)	2.0+9.6 −0.9 s [8(6) s]	SF (<50%)	(various)	
This table header & footer:

== Isotopes and nuclear properties ==
=== Nucleosynthesis ===
Super-heavy elements such as nihonium are produced by bombarding lighter elements in particle accelerators that induce fusion reactions. Whereas most of the isotopes of nihonium can be synthesized directly this way, some heavier ones have only been observed as decay products of elements with higher atomic numbers.

Depending on the energies involved, the former are separated into "hot" and "cold". In hot fusion reactions, very light, high-energy projectiles are accelerated toward very heavy targets (actinides), giving rise to compound nuclei at high excitation energy (~40–50 MeV) that may either fission or evaporate several (3 to 5) neutrons. In cold fusion reactions, the produced fused nuclei have a relatively low excitation energy (~10–20 MeV), which decreases the probability that these products will undergo fission reactions. As the fused nuclei cool to the ground state, they require emission of only one or two neutrons, and thus, allows for the generation of more neutron-rich products. The latter is a distinct concept from that of where nuclear fusion claimed to be achieved at room temperature conditions (see cold fusion).

==== Cold fusion ====
Before the synthesis of nihonium by the RIKEN team, scientists at the Institute for Heavy Ion Research (Gesellschaft für Schwerionenforschung) in Darmstadt, Germany also tried to synthesize nihonium by bombarding bismuth-209 with zinc-70 in 1998. No nihonium atoms were identified in two separate runs of the reaction. They repeated the experiment in 2003 again without success. In late 2003, the emerging team at RIKEN using their efficient apparatus GARIS attempted the reaction and reached a limit of 140 fb. In December 2003 – August 2004, they resorted to "brute force" and carried out the reaction for a period of eight months. They were able to detect a single atom of ^{278}Nh. They repeated the reaction in several runs in 2005 and were able to synthesize a second atom, followed by a third in 2012.

The table below contains various combinations of targets and projectiles which could be used to form compound nuclei with Z=113.

Target	Projectile	CN	Attempt result
^{208}Pb	^{71}Ga	^{279}Nh	Reaction yet to be attempted
^{209}Bi	^{70}Zn	^{279}Nh	Successful reaction
^{238}U	^{45}Sc	^{283}Nh	Reaction yet to be attempted
^{237}Np	^{48}Ca	^{285}Nh	Successful reaction
^{244}Pu	^{41}K	^{285}Nh	Reaction yet to be attempted
^{250}Cm	^{37}Cl	^{287}Nh	Reaction yet to be attempted
^{248}Cm	^{37}Cl	^{285}Nh	Reaction yet to be attempted

==== Hot fusion ====
In June 2006, the Dubna-Livermore team synthesised nihonium directly by bombarding a neptunium-237 target with accelerated calcium-48 nuclei, in a search for the lighter isotopes ^{281}Nh and ^{282}Nh and their decay products, to provide insight into the stabilizing effects of the closed neutron shells at N = 162 and N = 184:

^{237}_{93}Np + ^{48}_{20}Ca → ^{282}_{113}Nh + 3 ^{1}_{0}n

Two atoms of ^{282}Nh were detected.

==== As decay product ====
List of nihonium isotopes observed by decay
Evaporation residue	Observed nihonium isotope
^{294}Lv, ^{290}Fl ?	^{290}Nh ?
^{287}Fl ?	^{287}Nh ?
^{294}Ts, ^{290}Mc	^{286}Nh
^{293}Ts, ^{289}Mc	^{285}Nh
^{288}Mc	^{284}Nh
^{287}Mc	^{283}Nh
^{286}Mc	^{282}Nh

Nihonium has been observed as a decay product of moscovium (via alpha decay). Moscovium currently has five known isotopes; all of them undergo alpha decays to become nihonium nuclei, with mass numbers between 282 and 286. Parent moscovium nuclei can be themselves decay products of tennessine. It may also occur as a decay product of flerovium (via electron capture), and parent flerovium nuclei can be themselves decay products of livermorium. For example, in January 2010, the Dubna team (JINR) identified nihonium-286 as a product in the decay of tennessine via an alpha decay sequence:

^{294}_{117}Ts → ^{290}_{115}Mc + ^{4}_{2}He
^{290}_{115}Mc → ^{286}_{113}Nh + ^{4}_{2}He

=== Theoretical calculations ===
==== Evaporation residue cross sections ====
The below table contains various targets-projectile combinations for which calculations have provided estimates for cross section yields from various neutron evaporation channels. The channel with the highest expected yield is given.

DNS = Di-nuclear system; σ = cross section

Target	Projectile	CN	Channel (product)	σ_{max}	Model	Ref
^{209}Bi	^{70}Zn	^{279}Nh	1n (^{278}Nh)	30 fb	DNS	
^{238}U	^{45}Sc	^{283}Nh	3n (^{280}Nh)	20 fb	DNS	
^{237}Np	^{48}Ca	^{285}Nh	3n (^{282}Nh)	0.4 pb	DNS	
^{244}Pu	^{41}K	^{285}Nh	3n (^{282}Nh)	42.2 fb	DNS	
^{250}Cm	^{37}Cl	^{287}Nh	4n (^{283}Nh)	0.594 pb	DNS	
^{248}Cm	^{37}Cl	^{285}Nh	3n (^{282}Nh)	0.26 pb	DNS	
