= Isotopes of tennessine =

Isotopes of tennessine (_{117}Ts)
Main isotopes			Decay	
Isotope	abundance	half-life (t_{1/2})	mode	product
^{293}Ts	synth	22 ms	α	^{289}Mc
^{294}Ts	synth	51 ms	α	^{290}Mc

Tennessine (_{117}Ts) is the most-recently synthesized synthetic element, and much of the data is hypothetical. As for any synthetic element, a standard atomic weight cannot be given. Like all synthetic elements, it has no stable isotopes. The first (and so far only) isotopes to be synthesized were ^{293}Ts and ^{294}Ts in 2009. The longer-lived isotope is ^{294}Ts with a half-life of 51 ms.

== List of isotopes ==
Nuclide	Z	N	Isotopic mass (Da) (Note: ( ) – Uncertainty (1σ) is given in concise form in parentheses after the corresponding last digits.) (Note: # – Atomic mass marked #: value and uncertainty derived not from purely experimental data, but at least partly from trends from the Mass Surface (TMS).)	Discovery year	Half-life	Decay mode	Daughter isotope	Spin and parity
^{293}Ts	117	176	293.20873(84)#	2010	22+8 −4 ms [25(6) ms]	α	^{289}Mc	
^{294}Ts	117	177	294.21084(64)#	2010	51+38 −16 ms [70(30) ms]	α	^{290}Mc	
This table header & footer:

== Isotopes and nuclear properties ==
=== Nucleosynthesis ===
==== Target-projectile combinations leading to Z=117 compound nuclei ====
The below table contains various combinations of targets and projectiles that could be used to form compound nuclei with atomic number 117.

Target	Projectile	CN	Attempt result
^{208}Pb	^{81}Br	^{289}Ts	Reaction yet to be attempted
^{209}Bi	^{82}Se	^{291}Ts	Reaction yet to be attempted
^{238}U	^{55}Mn	^{293}Ts	Reaction yet to be attempted
^{243}Am	^{50}Ti	^{293}Ts	Reaction yet to be attempted
^{249}Bk	^{48}Ca	^{297}Ts	Successful reaction

==== Hot fusion ====
===== ^{249}Bk(^{48}Ca,xn)^{297−x}Ts (x=3,4) =====
Between July 2009 and February 2010, the team at the JINR (Flerov Laboratory of Nuclear Reactions) ran a 7-month-long experiment to synthesize tennessine using the reaction above. The expected cross-section was of the order of 2 pb. The expected evaporation residues, ^{293}Ts and ^{294}Ts, were predicted to decay via relatively long decay chains as far as isotopes of dubnium or lawrencium.

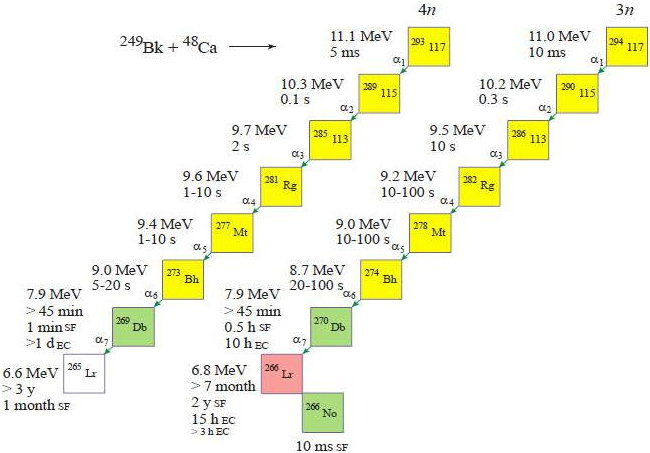
Calculated decay chains from the parent nuclei ^{293}Ts and ^{294}Ts

The team published a paper in April 2010 (first results were presented in January 2010) that six atoms of the isotopes ^{294}Ts (one atom) and ^{293}Ts (five atoms) were detected. ^{294}Ts decayed by six alpha decays down as far as the new isotope ^{270}Db, which underwent apparent spontaneous fission. The lighter odd-even isotope underwent just three alpha decays, as far as ^{281}Rg, which underwent spontaneous fission. The reaction was run at two different excitation energies, 35 MeV (dose 2×10^{19}) and 39 MeV (dose 2.4×10^{19}). Initial decay data was published as a preliminary presentation on the JINR website.

A further experiment in May 2010, aimed at studying the chemistry of the granddaughter of tennessine, nihonium, identified a further two atoms of ^{286}Nh from decay of ^{294}Ts. The original experiment was repeated successfully by the same collaboration in 2012 and by a joint German–American team in May 2014, confirming the discovery.

==== Chronology of isotope discovery ====
Isotope	Year discovered	Reaction
^{294}Ts	2009	^{249}Bk(^{48}Ca,3n)
^{293}Ts	2009	^{249}Bk(^{48}Ca,4n)

=== Theoretical calculations ===
==== Evaporation residue cross sections ====
The below table contains various targets-projectile combinations for which calculations have provided estimates for cross section yields from various neutron evaporation channels. The channel with the highest expected yield is given.

DNS = Di-nuclear system; σ = cross section

Target	Projectile	CN	Channel (product)	σ_{max}	Model	Ref
^{209}Bi	^{82}Se	^{291}Ts	1n (^{290}Ts)	15 fb	DNS	
^{209}Bi	^{79}Se	^{288}Ts	1n (^{287}Ts)	0.2 pb	DNS	
^{232}Th	^{59}Co	^{291}Ts	2n (^{289}Ts)	0.1 pb	DNS	
^{238}U	^{55}Mn	^{293}Ts	2-3n (^{291,290}Ts)	70 fb	DNS	
^{244}Pu	^{51}V	^{295}Ts	3n (^{292}Ts)	0.6 pb	DNS	
^{248}Cm	^{45}Sc	^{293}Ts	4n (^{289}Ts)	2.9 pb	DNS	
^{246}Cm	^{45}Sc	^{291}Ts	4n (^{287}Ts)	1 pb	DNS	
^{249}Bk	^{48}Ca	^{297}Ts	3n (^{294}Ts)	2.1 pb ; 3 pb	DNS	
^{247}Bk	^{48}Ca	^{295}Ts	3n (^{292}Ts)	0.8, 0.9 pb	DNS	

==== Decay characteristics ====
Theoretical calculations in a quantum tunneling model with mass estimates from a macroscopic-microscopic model predict the alpha-decay half-lives of isotopes of tennessine (namely, ^{289–303}Ts) to be around 0.1–40 ms.
