= Moscovium =

Moscovium, _{115}Mc
Moscovium
- Pronunciation: /mɒˈskoʊviəm/ (mo-SKOH-vee-əm)
- Mass number: [290]

Moscovium in the periodic table
Hydrogen																															Helium
Lithium	Beryllium																									Boron	Carbon	Nitrogen	Oxygen	Fluorine	Neon
Sodium	Magnesium																									Aluminium	Silicon	Phosphorus	Sulfur	Chlorine	Argon
Potassium	Calcium															Scandium	Titanium	Vanadium	Chromium	Manganese	Iron	Cobalt	Nickel	Copper	Zinc	Gallium	Germanium	Arsenic	Selenium	Bromine	Krypton
Rubidium	Strontium															Yttrium	Zirconium	Niobium	Molybdenum	Technetium	Ruthenium	Rhodium	Palladium	Silver	Cadmium	Indium	Tin	Antimony	Tellurium	Iodine	Xenon
Caesium	Barium	Lanthanum	Cerium	Praseodymium	Neodymium	Promethium	Samarium	Europium	Gadolinium	Terbium	Dysprosium	Holmium	Erbium	Thulium	Ytterbium	Lutetium	Hafnium	Tantalum	Tungsten	Rhenium	Osmium	Iridium	Platinum	Gold	Mercury (element)	Thallium	Lead	Bismuth	Polonium	Astatine	Radon
Francium	Radium	Actinium	Thorium	Protactinium	Uranium	Neptunium	Plutonium	Americium	Curium	Berkelium	Californium	Einsteinium	Fermium	Mendelevium	Nobelium	Lawrencium	Rutherfordium	Dubnium	Seaborgium	Bohrium	Hassium	Meitnerium	Darmstadtium	Roentgenium	Copernicium	Nihonium	Flerovium	Moscovium	Livermorium	Tennessine	Oganesson
Bi
↑
Mc
↓
—
flerovium ← moscovium → livermorium
- Atomic number (Z): 115
- Group: group 15 (pnictogens)
- Period: period 7
- Block: p-block
- Electron configuration: [Rn] 5f^{14} 6d^{10} 7s^{2} 7p^{3} (predicted)
- Electrons per shell: 2, 8, 18, 32, 32, 18, 5 (predicted)

Physical properties
- Phase at STP: solid (predicted)
- Melting point: 670 K (400 °C, 750 °F) (predicted)
- Boiling point: ~1400 K (~1100 °C, ~2000 °F) (predicted)
- Density (near r.t.): 13.5 g/cm^{3} (predicted)
- Heat of fusion: 5.90–5.98 kJ/mol (extrapolated)
- Heat of vaporization: 138 kJ/mol (predicted)

Atomic properties
- Oxidation states: common: (none) (+1), (+3)
- Ionization energies: 1st: 538.3 kJ/mol (predicted); 2nd: 1760 kJ/mol (predicted); 3rd: 2650 kJ/mol (predicted); (more)
- Atomic radius: empirical: 187 pm (predicted)
- Covalent radius: 156–158 pm (extrapolated)

Other properties
- Natural occurrence: synthetic
- CAS Number: 54085-64-2

History
- Naming: After Moscow region
- Discovery: Joint Institute for Nuclear Research and Lawrence Livermore National Laboratory (2003)

Isotopes of moscovium
Main isotopes			Decay	
Isotope	abundance	half-life (t_{1/2})	mode	product
^{286}Mc	synth	20 ms	α	^{282}Nh
^{287}Mc	synth	38 ms	α	^{283}Nh
^{288}Mc	synth	193 ms	α	^{284}Nh
^{289}Mc	synth	250 ms	α	^{285}Nh
^{290}Mc	synth	650 ms	α	^{286}Nh

Moscovium is a synthetic chemical element; it has symbol Mc and atomic number 115. It was first synthesized in 2003 by a joint team of Russian and American scientists at the Joint Institute for Nuclear Research (JINR) in Dubna, Russia. In December 2015, it was recognized as one of four new elements by the Joint Working Party of international scientific bodies IUPAC and IUPAP. On 28 November 2016, it was officially named after the Moscow Oblast, in which the JINR is situated.

Moscovium is an extremely radioactive element: its most stable known isotope, moscovium-290, has a half-life of only 0.65 seconds. In the periodic table, it is a p-block transactinide element. It is a member of the 7th period and is placed in group 15 as the heaviest pnictogen. Moscovium is calculated to have some properties similar to its lighter homologues, nitrogen, phosphorus, arsenic, antimony, and bismuth, and to be a post-transition metal, although it should also show several major differences from them. In particular, moscovium should also have significant similarities to thallium, as both have one rather loosely bound electron outside a quasi-closed shell. Chemical experimentation on single atoms has confirmed theoretical expectations that moscovium is less reactive than its lighter homologue bismuth. Over a hundred atoms of moscovium have been observed to date, all of which have been shown to have mass numbers from 286 to 290.

== Introduction ==
=== Synthesis of superheavy nuclei ===
A graphic depiction of a nuclear fusion reaction. Two nuclei fuse into one, emitting a neutron. Reactions that created new elements to this moment were similar, though varying numbers of neutrons – or alternatively charged particles – may be emitted instead.

A superheavy (Note: In nuclear physics, an element is called heavy if its atomic number is high; lead (element 82) is one example of such a heavy element. The term "superheavy elements" typically refers to elements with atomic number greater than 103 (although there are other definitions, such as atomic number greater than 100 or 112; sometimes, the term is presented an equivalent to the term "transactinide", which puts an upper limit before the beginning of the hypothetical superactinide series). Terms "heavy isotopes" (of a given element) and "heavy nuclei" mean what could be understood in the common language—isotopes of high mass (for the given element) and nuclei of high mass, respectively.) atomic nucleus is created in a nuclear reaction that combines two other nuclei of unequal size (Note: In 2009, a team at the JINR led by Oganessian published results of their attempt to create hassium in a symmetric ^{136}Xe + ^{136}Xe reaction. They failed to observe a single atom in such a reaction, putting the upper limit on the cross section, the measure of probability of a nuclear reaction, as 2.5 pb. In comparison, the reaction that resulted in hassium discovery, ^{208}Pb + ^{58}Fe, had a cross section of ~20 pb (more specifically, 19^{+19}_{-11} pb), as estimated by the discoverers.) into one; roughly, the more unequal the two nuclei in terms of mass, the greater the possibility that the two react. The material made of the heavier nuclei is made into a target, which is then bombarded by the beam of lighter nuclei. Two nuclei can only fuse into one if they are close enough to each other; normally, nuclei (all positively charged) repel each other due to electrostatic repulsion. The strong interaction can overcome this repulsion but only within a very short distance from a nucleus; beam nuclei are thus greatly accelerated in order to make such repulsion insignificant compared to the velocity of the beam nucleus. The energy applied to the beam nuclei to accelerate them can cause them to reach speeds as high as one-tenth of the speed of light. However, if too much energy is applied, the beam nucleus can fall apart.

Coming close enough alone is not enough for two nuclei to fuse: when two nuclei approach each other, they usually remain together for about 10^{−20} seconds and then part ways (not necessarily in the same composition as before the reaction) rather than form a single nucleus. This happens because during the attempted formation of a single nucleus, electrostatic repulsion tears apart the nucleus that is being formed. Each pair of a target and a beam is characterized by its cross section—the probability that fusion will occur if two nuclei approach one another expressed in terms of the transverse area that the incident particle must hit in order for the fusion to occur. (Note: The amount of energy applied to the beam particle to accelerate it can also influence the value of cross section. For example, in the ^{28}_{14}Si + ^{1}_{0}n → ^{28}_{13}Al + ^{1}_{1}p reaction, cross section changes smoothly from 370 mb at 12.3 MeV to 160 mb at 18.3 MeV, with a broad peak at 13.5 MeV with the maximum value of 380 mb.) This fusion may occur as a result of the quantum effect in which nuclei can tunnel through electrostatic repulsion. If the two nuclei can stay close past that phase, multiple nuclear interactions result in redistribution of energy and an energy equilibrium.

External videos
- Visualization of unsuccessful nuclear fusion, based on calculations from the Australian National University

The resulting merger is an excited state—termed a compound nucleus—and thus it is very unstable. To reach a more stable state, the temporary merger may fission without formation of a more stable nucleus. Alternatively, the compound nucleus may eject a few neutrons, which would carry away the excitation energy; if the latter is not sufficient for a neutron expulsion, the merger would produce a gamma ray. This happens in about 10^{−16} seconds after the initial nuclear collision and results in creation of a more stable nucleus. The definition by the IUPAC/IUPAP Joint Working Party (JWP) states that a chemical element can only be recognized as discovered if a nucleus of it exists for at least 10^{−14} seconds. This value was chosen as an estimate of how long it takes a nucleus to acquire electrons and thus display its chemical properties. (Note: This figure also marks the generally accepted upper limit for lifetime of a compound nucleus.)

=== Decay and detection ===
The beam passes through the target and reaches the next chamber, the separator; if a new nucleus is produced, it is carried with this beam. In the separator, the newly produced nucleus is separated from other nuclides (that of the original beam and any other reaction products) (Note: This separation is based on that the resulting nuclei move past the target more slowly then the unreacted beam nuclei. The separator contains electric and magnetic fields whose effects on a moving particle cancel out for a specific velocity of a particle. Such separation can also be aided by a time-of-flight measurement and a recoil energy measurement; a combination of the two may allow to estimate the mass of a nucleus.) and transferred to a surface-barrier detector, which stops the nucleus. The exact location of the upcoming impact on the detector is marked; also marked are its energy and the time of the arrival. The transfer takes about 10^{−6} seconds; in order to be detected, the nucleus must survive this long. The nucleus is recorded again once its decay is registered, and the location, the energy, and the time of the decay are measured.

Stability of a nucleus is provided by the strong interaction. However, its range is very short; as nuclei become larger, its influence on the outermost nucleons (protons and neutrons) weakens. At the same time, the nucleus is torn apart by electrostatic repulsion between protons, and its range is not limited. Total binding energy provided by the strong interaction increases linearly with the number of nucleons, whereas electrostatic repulsion increases with the square of the atomic number, i.e. the latter grows faster and becomes increasingly important for heavy and superheavy nuclei. Superheavy nuclei are thus theoretically predicted and have so far been observed to predominantly decay via decay modes that are caused by such repulsion: alpha decay and spontaneous fission. (Note: Not all decay modes are caused by electrostatic repulsion. For example, beta decay is caused by the weak interaction.) Almost all alpha emitters have over 210 nucleons, and the lightest nuclide primarily undergoing spontaneous fission has 238. In both decay modes, nuclei are inhibited from decaying by corresponding energy barriers for each mode, but they can be tunneled through.

Scheme of an apparatus for creation of superheavy elements, based on the Dubna Gas-Filled Recoil Separator set up in the Flerov Laboratory of Nuclear Reactions in JINR. The trajectory within the detector and the beam focusing apparatus changes because of a dipole magnet in the former and quadrupole magnets in the latter.

Alpha particles are commonly produced in radioactive decays because the mass of an alpha particle per nucleon is small enough to leave some energy for the alpha particle to be used as kinetic energy to leave the nucleus. Spontaneous fission is caused by electrostatic repulsion tearing the nucleus apart and produces various nuclei in different instances of identical nuclei fissioning. As the atomic number increases, spontaneous fission rapidly becomes more important: spontaneous fission partial half-lives decrease by 23 orders of magnitude from uranium (element 92) to nobelium (element 102), and by 30 orders of magnitude from thorium (element 90) to fermium (element 100). The earlier liquid drop model thus suggested that spontaneous fission would occur nearly instantly due to disappearance of the fission barrier for nuclei with about 280 nucleons. The later nuclear shell model suggested that nuclei with about 300 nucleons would form an island of stability in which nuclei will be more resistant to spontaneous fission and will primarily undergo alpha decay with longer half-lives. Subsequent discoveries suggested that the predicted island might be further than originally anticipated; they also showed that nuclei intermediate between the long-lived actinides and the predicted island are deformed, and gain additional stability from shell effects. Experiments on lighter superheavy nuclei, as well as those closer to the expected island, have shown greater than previously anticipated stability against spontaneous fission, showing the importance of shell effects on nuclei. (Note: It was already known by the 1960s that ground states of nuclei differed in energy and shape as well as that certain magic numbers of nucleons corresponded to greater stability of a nucleus. However, it was assumed that there was no nuclear structure in superheavy nuclei as they were too deformed to form one.)

Alpha decays are registered by the emitted alpha particles, and the decay products are easy to determine before the actual decay; if such a decay or a series of consecutive decays produces a known nucleus, the original product of a reaction can be easily determined. (Note: Since mass of a nucleus is not measured directly but is rather calculated from that of another nucleus, such measurement is called indirect. Direct measurements are also possible, but for the most part they have remained unavailable for superheavy nuclei. The first direct measurement of mass of a superheavy nucleus was reported in 2018 at LBNL. Mass was determined from the location of a nucleus after the transfer (the location helps determine its trajectory, which is linked to the mass-to-charge ratio of the nucleus, since the transfer was done in presence of a magnet).) (That all decays within a decay chain were indeed related to each other is established by the location of these decays, which must be in the same place.) The known nucleus can be recognized by the specific characteristics of decay it undergoes such as decay energy (or more specifically, the kinetic energy of the emitted particle). (Note: If the decay occurred in a vacuum, then since total momentum of an isolated system before and after the decay must be preserved, the daughter nucleus would also receive a small velocity. The ratio of the two velocities, and accordingly the ratio of the kinetic energies, would thus be inverse to the ratio of the two masses. The decay energy equals the sum of the known kinetic energy of the alpha particle and that of the daughter nucleus (an exact fraction of the former). The calculations hold for an experiment as well, but the difference is that the nucleus does not move after the decay because it is tied to the detector.) Spontaneous fission, however, produces various nuclei as products, so the original nuclide cannot be determined from its daughters. (Note: Spontaneous fission was discovered by Soviet physicist Georgy Flerov, a leading scientist at JINR, and thus it was a "hobbyhorse" for the facility. In contrast, the LBL scientists believed fission information was not sufficient for a claim of synthesis of an element. They believed spontaneous fission had not been studied enough to use it for identification of a new element, since there was a difficulty of establishing that a compound nucleus had only ejected neutrons and not charged particles like protons or alpha particles. They thus preferred to link new isotopes to the already known ones by successive alpha decays.)

The information available to physicists aiming to synthesize a superheavy element is thus the information collected at the detectors: location, energy, and time of arrival of a particle to the detector, and those of its decay. The physicists analyze this data and seek to conclude that it was indeed caused by a new element and could not have been caused by a different nuclide than the one claimed. Often, provided data is insufficient for a conclusion that a new element was definitely created and there is no other explanation for the observed effects; errors in interpreting data have been made. (Note: For instance, element 102 was mistakenly identified in 1957 at the Nobel Institute of Physics in Stockholm, Stockholm County, Sweden. There were no earlier definitive claims of creation of this element, and the element was assigned a name by its Swedish, American, and British discoverers, nobelium. It was later shown that the identification was incorrect. The following year, RL was unable to reproduce the Swedish results and announced instead their synthesis of the element; that claim was also disproved later. JINR insisted that they were the first to create the element and suggested a name of their own for the new element, joliotium; the Soviet name was also not accepted (JINR later referred to the naming of the element 102 as "hasty"). This name was proposed to IUPAC in a written response to their ruling on priority of discovery claims of elements, signed 29 September 1992. The name "nobelium" remained unchanged on account of its widespread usage.)

== History ==
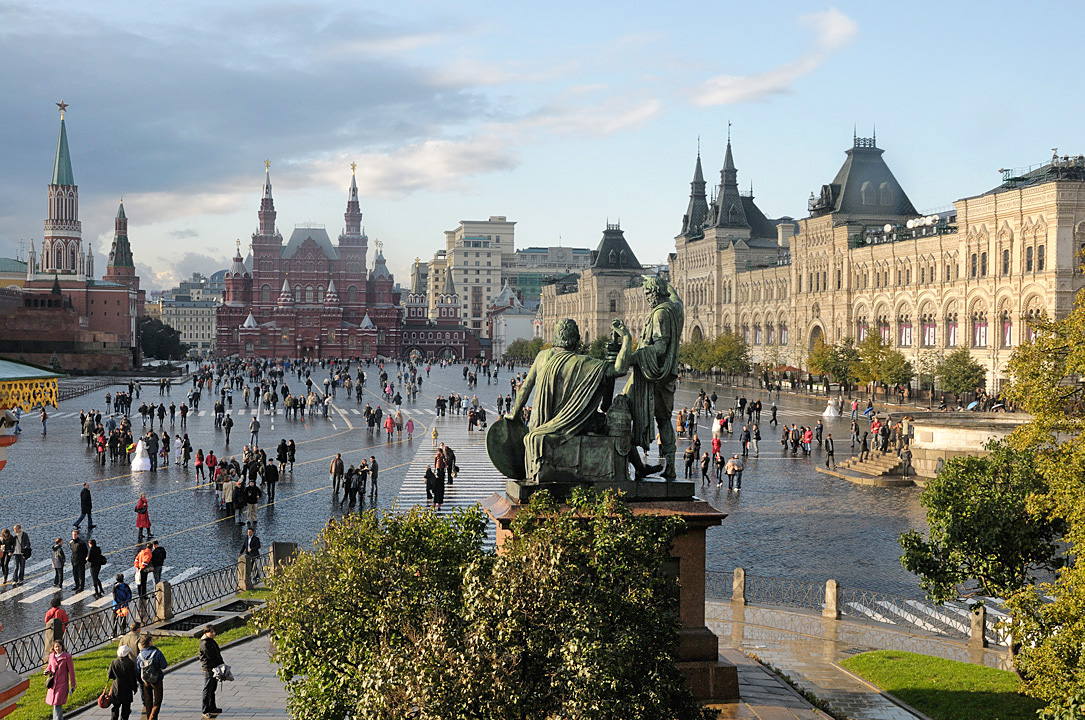
A view of the famous Red Square in Moscow. The region around the city was honored by the discoverers as "the ancient Russian land that is the home of the Joint Institute for Nuclear Research" and became the namesake of moscovium.

=== Discovery ===
The first successful synthesis of moscovium was by a joint team of Russian and American scientists in August 2003 at the Joint Institute for Nuclear Research (JINR) in Dubna, Russia. Headed by Russian nuclear physicist Yuri Oganessian, the team included American scientists of the Lawrence Livermore National Laboratory. The researchers on February 2, 2004, stated in Physical Review C that they bombarded americium-243 with calcium-48 ions to produce four atoms of moscovium. These atoms decayed by emission of alpha-particles to nihonium in about 100 milliseconds.

^{243}_{95}Am + ^{48}_{20}Ca → ^{288}_{115}Mc + 3 ^{1}_{0}n → ^{284}_{113}Nh + α
^{243}_{95}Am + ^{48}_{20}Ca → ^{287}_{115}Mc + 4 ^{1}_{0}n → ^{283}_{113}Nh + α

The Dubna–Livermore collaboration strengthened their claim to the discoveries of moscovium and nihonium by conducting chemical experiments on the final decay product ^{268}Db. None of the nuclides in this decay chain were previously known, so existing experimental data was not available to support their claim. In June 2004 and December 2005, the presence of a dubnium isotope was confirmed by extracting the final decay products, measuring spontaneous fission (SF) activities and using chemical identification techniques to confirm that they behave like a group 5 element (as dubnium is known to be in group 5 of the periodic table). Both the half-life and the decay mode were confirmed for the proposed ^{268}Db, lending support to the assignment of the parent nucleus to moscovium. However, in 2011, the IUPAC/IUPAP Joint Working Party (JWP) did not recognize the two elements as having been discovered, because current theory could not distinguish the chemical properties of group 4 and group 5 elements with sufficient confidence. Furthermore, the decay properties of all the nuclei in the decay chain of moscovium had not been previously characterized before the Dubna experiments, a situation which the JWP generally considers "troublesome, but not necessarily exclusive".

=== Road to confirmation ===
Two heavier isotopes of moscovium, ^{289}Mc and ^{290}Mc, were discovered in 2009–2010 as daughters of the tennessine isotopes ^{293}Ts and ^{294}Ts; the isotope ^{289}Mc was later also synthesized directly and confirmed to have the same properties as found in the tennessine experiments.

In 2011, the Joint Working Party of international scientific bodies International Union of Pure and Applied Chemistry (IUPAC) and International Union of Pure and Applied Physics (IUPAP) evaluated the 2004 and 2007 Dubna experiments, and concluded that they did not meet the criteria for discovery. Another evaluation of more recent experiments took place within the next few years, and a claim to the discovery of moscovium was again put forward by Dubna. In August 2013, a team of researchers at Lund University and at the Gesellschaft für Schwerionenforschung (GSI) in Darmstadt, Germany announced they had repeated the 2004 experiment, confirming Dubna's findings. Simultaneously, the 2004 experiment had been repeated at Dubna, now additionally also creating the isotope ^{289}Mc that could serve as a cross-bombardment for confirming the discovery of the tennessine isotope ^{293}Ts in 2010. Further confirmation was published by the team at the Lawrence Berkeley National Laboratory in 2015.

In December 2015, the IUPAC/IUPAP Joint Working Party recognized the element's discovery and assigned the priority to the Dubna-Livermore collaboration of 2009–2010, giving them the right to suggest a permanent name for it. While they did not recognise the experiments synthesising ^{287}Mc and ^{288}Mc as persuasive due to the lack of a convincing identification of atomic number via cross-reactions, they recognised the ^{293}Ts experiments as persuasive because its daughter ^{289}Mc had been produced independently and found to exhibit the same properties.

In May 2016, Lund University (Lund, Scania, Sweden) and GSI cast some doubt on the syntheses of moscovium and tennessine. The decay chains assigned to ^{289}Mc, the isotope instrumental in the confirmation of the syntheses of moscovium and tennessine, were found based on a new statistical method to be too different to belong to the same nuclide with a reasonably high probability. The reported ^{293}Ts decay chains approved as such by the JWP were found to require splitting into individual data sets assigned to different tennessine isotopes. It was also found that the claimed link between the decay chains reported as from ^{293}Ts and ^{289}Mc probably did not exist. (On the other hand, the chains from the non-approved isotope ^{294}Ts were found to be congruent.) The multiplicity of states found when nuclides that are not even–even undergo alpha decay is not unexpected and contributes to the lack of clarity in the cross-reactions. This study criticized the JWP report for overlooking subtleties associated with this issue, and considered it "problematic" that the only argument for the acceptance of the discoveries of moscovium and tennessine was a link they considered to be doubtful.

On June 8, 2017, two members of the Dubna team published a journal article answering these criticisms, analysing their data on the nuclides ^{293}Ts and ^{289}Mc with widely accepted statistical methods, noted that the 2016 studies indicating non-congruence produced problematic results when applied to radioactive decay: they excluded from the 90% confidence interval both average and extreme decay times, and the decay chains that would be excluded from the 90% confidence interval they chose were more probable to be observed than those that would be included. The 2017 reanalysis concluded that the observed decay chains of ^{293}Ts and ^{289}Mc were consistent with the assumption that only one nuclide was present at each step of the chain, although it would be desirable to be able to directly measure the mass number of the originating nucleus of each chain as well as the excitation function of the ^{243}Am+^{48}Ca reaction.

=== Naming ===
Using Mendeleev's nomenclature for unnamed and undiscovered elements, moscovium is sometimes known as eka-bismuth. In 1979, IUPAC recommended that the placeholder systematic element name ununpentium (with the corresponding symbol of Uup) be used until the discovery of the element is confirmed and a permanent name is decided. Although widely used in the chemical community on all levels, from chemistry classrooms to advanced textbooks, the recommendations were mostly ignored among scientists in the field (for whom it was not created anyway), who called it "element 115", with the symbol of E115, (115) or even simply 115.

On 30 December 2015, discovery of the element was recognized by the International Union of Pure and Applied Chemistry (IUPAC). According to IUPAC recommendations, the discoverer(s) of a new element has the right to suggest a name. A suggested name was langevinium, after Paul Langevin. Later, the Dubna team mentioned the name moscovium several times as one among many possibilities, referring to the Moscow Oblast where Dubna is located. This name had previously been considered by the JINR for element 116, but it was then decided to name that element livermorium.

In June 2016, IUPAC endorsed the latter proposal to be formally accepted by the end of the year, which it was on 28 November 2016. The naming ceremony for moscovium, tennessine, and oganesson was held on 2 March 2017 at the Russian Academy of Sciences in Moscow.

=== Other routes of synthesis ===
In 2024, the team at JINR reported the observation of one decay chain of ^{289}Mc while studying the reaction between ^{242}Pu and ^{50}Ti, aimed at producing more neutron-deficient livermorium isotopes in preparation for synthesis attempts of elements 119 and 120. This was the first successful report of a charged-particle exit channel – the evaporation of a proton and two neutrons, rather than only neutrons, as the compound nucleus de-excites to the ground state – in a hot fusion reaction between an actinide target and a projectile with atomic number greater than or equal to 20. Such reactions have been proposed as a novel synthesis route for yet-undiscovered isotopes of superheavy elements with several neutrons more than the known ones, which may be closer to the theorized island of stability and have longer half-lives. In particular, the isotopes ^{291}Mc–^{293}Mc may be reachable in these types of reactions within current detection limits.

== Predicted properties ==
Very few properties of moscovium or its compounds have been measured; due to its extremely limited and expensive production and the fact that it decays very quickly. A few singular properties have been measured, but for the most part, properties of moscovium remain unknown and only predictions are available.

=== Nuclear stability and isotopes ===
The expected location of the island of stability. The dotted line is the line of beta stability.

Moscovium is expected to be within an island of stability centered on copernicium (element 112) and flerovium (element 114). Due to the expected high fission barriers, any nucleus within this island of stability exclusively decays by alpha decay and perhaps some electron capture and beta decay. Although the known isotopes of moscovium do not actually have enough neutrons to be on the island of stability, they can be seen to approach the island as in general, the heavier isotopes are the longer-lived ones.

The hypothetical isotope ^{291}Mc is an especially interesting case as it has only one neutron more than the heaviest known moscovium isotope, ^{290}Mc. It could plausibly be synthesized as the daughter of ^{295}Ts, which in turn could be made from the reaction ^{249}Bk(^{48}Ca,2n)^{295}Ts. Calculations show that it may have a significant electron capture or positron emission decay mode in addition to alpha decay and also have a relatively long half-life of several seconds. This would produce ^{291}Fl, ^{291}Nh, and finally ^{291}Cn which is expected to be in the middle of the island of stability and have a half-life of about 1200 years, affording the most likely hope of reaching the middle of the island using current technology. Possible drawbacks are that the cross section of the production reaction of ^{295}Ts is expected to be low and the decay properties of superheavy nuclei this close to the line of beta stability are largely unexplored. The heavy isotopes from ^{291}Mc to ^{294}Mc might also be produced using charged-particle evaporation, in the ^{245}Cm(^{48}Ca,pxn) and ^{248}Cm(^{48}Ca,pxn) reactions.

The isotope ^{286}Mc was found in 2021 at Dubna, in the ^{243}Am(^{48}Ca,5n)^{286}Mc reaction: it decays into the already-known ^{282}Nh and its daughters. The undiscovered light isotopes ^{284}Mc and ^{285}Mc could be synthesized in the ^{241}Am+^{48}Ca reaction. They are predicted to undergo a chain of alpha decays, ending at transactinide isotopes too light to be produced by hot fusion and too heavy to be produced by cold fusion. The yet-lighter ^{282}Mc and ^{283}Mc could be synthesized in the ^{243}Am+^{44}Ca, but the cross section would likely be lower.

Other possibilities to synthesize nuclei on the island of stability include quasifission (partial fusion followed by fission) of a massive nucleus. Such nuclei tend to fission, expelling doubly magic or nearly doubly magic fragments such as calcium-40, tin-132, lead-208, or bismuth-209. It has been shown that the multi-nucleon transfer reactions in collisions of actinide nuclei (such as uranium and curium) might be used to synthesize the neutron-rich superheavy nuclei located at the island of stability, although formation of the lighter elements nobelium or seaborgium is more favored. One last possibility to synthesize isotopes near the island is to use controlled nuclear explosions to create a neutron flux high enough to bypass the gaps of instability at ^{258–260}Fm and at mass number 275 (atomic numbers 104 to 108), mimicking the r-process in which the actinides were first produced in nature and the gap of instability around radon bypassed. Some such isotopes (especially ^{291}Cn and ^{293}Cn) may even have been synthesized in nature, but would have decayed away far too quickly (with half-lives of only thousands of years) and be produced in far too small quantities (about 10^{−12} the abundance of lead) to be detectable as primordial nuclides today outside cosmic rays.

=== Physical and atomic ===
In the periodic table, moscovium is a member of group 15, the pnictogens. It appears below nitrogen, phosphorus, arsenic, antimony, and bismuth. Every previous pnictogen has five electrons in its valence shell, forming a valence electron configuration of ns^{2}np^{3}. In moscovium's case, the trend should be continued and the valence electron configuration is predicted to be 7s^{2}7p^{3}; therefore, moscovium will behave similarly to its lighter congeners in many respects. However, notable differences are likely to arise; a largely contributing effect is the spin–orbit (SO) interaction—the mutual interaction between the electrons' motion and spin. It is especially strong for the superheavy elements, because their electrons move much faster than in lighter atoms, at velocities comparable to the speed of light. In relation to moscovium atoms, it lowers the 7s and the 7p electron energy levels (stabilizing the corresponding electrons), but two of the 7p electron energy levels are stabilized more than the other four. The stabilization of the 7s electrons is called the inert-pair effect, and the effect "tearing" the 7p subshell into the more stabilized and the less stabilized parts is called subshell splitting. Computation chemists see the split as a change of the second (azimuthal) quantum number l from 1 to 1/2 and 3/2 for the more stabilized and less stabilized parts of the 7p subshell, respectively. (Note: The quantum number corresponds to the letter in the electron orbital name: 0 to s, 1 to p, 2 to d, etc. See azimuthal quantum number for more information.) For many theoretical purposes, the valence electron configuration may be represented to reflect the 7p subshell split as 7s^{2}7p^{2}_{1/2}7p^{1}_{3/2}. These effects cause moscovium's chemistry to be somewhat different from that of its lighter congeners.

The valence electrons of moscovium fall into three subshells: 7s (two electrons), 7p_{1/2} (two electrons), and 7p_{3/2} (one electron). The first two of these are relativistically stabilized and hence behave as inert pairs, while the last is relativistically destabilized and can easily participate in chemistry. (The 6d electrons are not destabilized enough to participate chemically.) Thus, the +1 oxidation state should be favored, like Tl^{+}, and consistent with this the first ionization potential of moscovium should be around 5.58 eV, continuing the trend towards lower ionization potentials down the pnictogens. Moscovium and nihonium both have one electron outside a quasi-closed shell configuration that can be delocalized in the metallic state: thus they should have similar melting and boiling points (both melting around 400 °C and boiling around 1100 °C) due to the strength of their metallic bonds being similar. Additionally, the predicted ionization potential, ionic radius (1.5 Å for Mc^{+}; 1.0 Å for Mc^{3+}), and polarizability of Mc^{+} are expected to be more similar to Tl^{+} than its true congener Bi^{3+}. Moscovium should be a dense metal due to its high atomic weight, with a density around 13.5 g/cm^{3}. The electron of the hydrogen-like moscovium atom (oxidized so that it only has one electron, Mc^{114+}) is expected to move so fast that it has a mass 1.82 times that of a stationary electron, due to relativistic effects. For comparison, the figures for hydrogen-like bismuth and antimony are expected to be 1.25 and 1.077 respectively.

=== Chemical ===
Moscovium is predicted to be the third member of the 7p series of chemical elements and the heaviest member of group 15 in the periodic table, below bismuth. Unlike the two previous 7p elements, moscovium is expected to be a good homologue of its lighter congener, in this case bismuth. In this group, each member is known to portray the group oxidation state of +5 but with differing stability. For nitrogen, the +5 state is mostly a formal explanation of molecules like N_{2}O_{5}: it is very difficult to have five covalent bonds to nitrogen due to the inability of the small nitrogen atom to accommodate five ligands. The +5 state is well represented for the essentially non-relativistic typical pnictogens phosphorus, arsenic, and antimony. However, for bismuth it becomes rare due to the relativistic stabilization of the 6s orbitals known as the inert-pair effect, so that the 6s electrons are reluctant to bond chemically. It is expected that moscovium will have an inert-pair effect for both the 7s and the 7p_{1/2} electrons, as the binding energy of the lone 7p_{3/2} electron is noticeably lower than that of the 7p_{1/2} electrons. Nitrogen(I) and bismuth(I) are known but rare and moscovium(I) is likely to show some unique properties, probably behaving more like thallium(I) than bismuth(I). Because of spin-orbit coupling, flerovium may display closed-shell or noble gas-like properties; if this is the case, moscovium will likely be typically monovalent as a result, since the cation Mc^{+} will have the same electron configuration as flerovium, perhaps giving moscovium some alkali metal character. Calculations predict that moscovium(I) fluoride and chloride would be ionic compounds, with an ionic radius of about 109–114 pm for Mc^{+}, although the 7p_{1/2} lone pair on the Mc^{+} ion should be highly polarisable. The Mc^{3+} cation should behave like its true lighter homolog Bi^{3+}. The 7s electrons are too stabilized to be able to contribute chemically and hence the +5 state should be impossible and moscovium may be considered to have only three valence electrons. Moscovium would be quite a reactive metal, with a standard reduction potential of −1.5 V for the Mc^{+}/Mc couple.

The chemistry of moscovium in aqueous solution should essentially be that of the Mc^{+} and Mc^{3+} ions. The former should be easily hydrolyzed and not be easily complexed with halides, cyanide, and ammonia. Moscovium(I) hydroxide (McOH), carbonate (Mc_{2}CO_{3}), oxalate (Mc_{2}C_{2}O_{4}), and fluoride (McF) should be soluble in water; the sulfide (Mc_{2}S) should be insoluble; and the chloride (McCl), bromide (McBr), iodide (McI), and thiocyanate (McSCN) should be only slightly soluble, so that adding excess hydrochloric acid would not noticeably affect the solubility of moscovium(I) chloride. Mc^{3+} should be about as stable as Tl^{3+} and hence should also be an important part of moscovium chemistry, although its closest homolog among the elements should be its lighter congener Bi^{3+}. Moscovium(III) fluoride (McF_{3}) and sulfide (Mc_{2}S_{3}) should be insoluble in water, similar to the corresponding bismuth compounds, while moscovium(III) chloride (McCl_{3}), bromide (McBr_{3}), and iodide (McI_{3}) should be readily soluble and easily hydrolyzed to form oxyhalides such as McOCl and McOBr, again analogous to bismuth. Both moscovium(I) and moscovium(III) should be common oxidation states and their relative stability should depend greatly on what they are complexed with and the likelihood of hydrolysis.

Like its lighter homologues ammonia, phosphine, arsine, stibine, and bismuthine, moscovine (McH_{3}) is expected to have a trigonal pyramidal molecular geometry, with an Mc–H bond length of 195.4 pm and a H–Mc–H bond angle of 91.8° (bismuthine has bond length 181.7 pm and bond angle 91.9°; stibine has bond length 172.3 pm and bond angle 92.0°). In the predicted aromatic pentagonal planar Mc_{5}^{−} cluster, analogous to pentazolate (N_{5}^{−}), the Mc–Mc bond length is expected to be expanded from the extrapolated value of 312–316 pm to 329 pm due to spin–orbit coupling effects.

== Experimental chemistry ==
The isotopes ^{288}Mc, ^{289}Mc, and ^{290}Mc have half-lives long enough for chemical investigation. A 2024 experiment at the GSI, producing ^{288}Mc via the ^{243}Am+^{48}Ca reaction, studied the adsorption of nihonium and moscovium on SiO_{2} and gold surfaces. The adsorption enthalpy of moscovium on SiO_{2} was determined experimentally as −ΔH^{SiO_{2}}_{ads}(Mc) = 54^{+11}_{−5} kJ/mol (68% confidence interval). Moscovium was determined to be less reactive with the SiO_{2} surface than its lighter congener bismuth, but more reactive than closed-shell copernicium and flerovium. This arises because of the relativistic stabilisation of the 7p_{1/2} shell.

== See also ==
- Materials science in science fiction § Moscovium

== Bibliography ==
- Audi, G.; Kondev, F. G.; Wang, M.; et al. (2017). "The NUBASE2016 evaluation of nuclear properties". Chinese Physics C. 41 (3) 030001. Bibcode:2017ChPhC..41c0001A. doi:10.1088/1674-1137/41/3/030001.
- Beiser, A. (2003). Concepts of modern physics (6th ed.). McGraw-Hill. ISBN 978-0-07-244848-1. OCLC 48965418.
- Hoffman, D. C.; Ghiorso, A.; Seaborg, G. T. (2000). The Transuranium People: The Inside Story. World Scientific. ISBN 978-1-78-326244-1.
- Kragh, H. (2018). From Transuranic to Superheavy Elements: A Story of Dispute and Creation. Springer. ISBN 978-3-319-75813-8.
