= Isotopes of moscovium =

Isotopes of moscovium (_{115}Mc)
Main isotopes			Decay	
Isotope	abundance	half-life (t_{1/2})	mode	product
^{286}Mc	synth	20 ms	α	^{282}Nh
^{287}Mc	synth	38 ms	α	^{283}Nh
^{288}Mc	synth	193 ms	α	^{284}Nh
^{289}Mc	synth	250 ms	α	^{285}Nh
^{290}Mc	synth	650 ms	α	^{286}Nh

Moscovium (_{115}Mc) is a synthetic element, and thus a standard atomic weight cannot be given. Like all synthetic elements, it has no known stable isotopes. The first isotope to be synthesized was ^{288}Mc in 2004. There are five known radioisotopes from ^{286}Mc to ^{290}Mc. The longest-lived isotope is ^{290}Mc with a half-life of 0.65 seconds.

The isotopes undergo alpha decay into the corresponding isotope of nihonium, with half-lives increasing as neutron numbers increase.

== List of isotopes ==
Nuclide	Z	N	Isotopic mass (Da) (Note: ( ) – Uncertainty (1σ) is given in concise form in parentheses after the corresponding last digits.) (Note: # – Atomic mass marked #: value and uncertainty derived not from purely experimental data, but at least partly from trends from the Mass Surface (TMS).)	Discovery year	Half-life	Decay mode	Daughter isotope	Spin and parity
^{286}Mc	115	171		2022	20+98 −9 ms	α	^{282}Nh	
^{287}Mc	115	172	287.19082(48)#	2004	38+22 −10 ms	α	^{283}Nh	
^{288}Mc	115	173	288.19288(58)#	2004	193+15 −13 ms	α	^{284}Nh	
^{289}Mc	115	174	289.19397(83)#	2010	250+51 −35 ms	α	^{285}Nh	
^{290}Mc (Note: Not directly synthesized, created as decay product of ^{294}Ts)	115	175	290.19624(64)#	2010	650+490 −200 ms [0.84(36) s]	α	^{286}Nh	
This table header & footer:

== Nucleosynthesis ==
=== Target-projectile combinations ===
The table below contains various combinations of targets and projectiles which could be used to form compound nuclei with Z = 115. Each entry is a combination for which calculations have provided estimates for cross section yields from various neutron evaporation channels. The channel with the highest expected yield is given.

Target	Projectile	CN	Attempt result
^{208}Pb	^{75}As	^{283}Mc	Reaction yet to be attempted
^{209}Bi	^{76}Ge	^{285}Mc	Reaction yet to be attempted
^{238}U	^{51}V	^{289}Mc	Failure to date
^{243}Am	^{48}Ca	^{291}Mc	Successful reaction
^{241}Am	^{48}Ca	^{289}Mc	Planned reaction
^{243}Am	^{44}Ca	^{287}Mc	Reaction yet to be attempted

=== Hot fusion ===
Hot fusion reactions are processes that create compound nuclei at high excitation energy (~40–50 MeV, hence "hot"), leading to a reduced probability of survival from fission. The excited nucleus then decays to the ground state via the emission of 3–5 neutrons. Fusion reactions utilizing ^{48}Ca nuclei usually produce compound nuclei with intermediate excitation energies (~30–35 MeV) and are sometimes referred to as "warm" fusion reactions. This leads, in part, to relatively high yields from these reactions.

==== ^{238}U(^{51}V,xn)^{289−x}Mc ====
There are strong indications that this reaction was performed in late 2004 as part of a uranium(IV) fluoride target test at the GSI. No reports have been published, suggesting that no product atoms were detected, as anticipated by the team.

==== ^{243}Am(^{48}Ca,xn)^{291−x}Mc (x=2,3,4,5) ====
This reaction was first performed by the team in Dubna in July–August 2003. In two separate runs they were able to detect 3 atoms of ^{288}Mc and a single atom of ^{287}Mc. The reaction was studied further in June 2004 in an attempt to isolate the descendant ^{268}Db from the ^{288}Mc decay chain. After chemical separation of a +4/+5 fraction, 15 SF decays were measured with a lifetime consistent with ^{268}Db. In order to prove that the decays were from dubnium-268, the team repeated the reaction in August 2005 and separated the +4 and +5 fractions and further separated the +5 fractions into tantalum-like and niobium-like ones. Five SF activities were observed, all occurring in the niobium-like fractions and none in the tantalum-like fractions, proving that the product was indeed isotopes of dubnium.

In a series of experiments between October 2010 – February 2011, scientists at the FLNR studied this reaction at a range of excitation energies. They were able to detect 21 atoms of ^{288}Mc and one atom of ^{289}Mc, from the 2n exit channel. This latter result was used to support the synthesis of tennessine. The 3n excitation function was completed with a maximum at ~8 pb. The data was consistent with that found in the first experiments in 2003.

This reaction was run again at five different energies in 2021 to test the new gas-filled separator at Dubna's SHE-factory. They detected 6 chains of ^{289}Mc, 58 chains of ^{288}Mc, and 2 chains of ^{287}Mc. For the first time the 5n channel was observed with 2 atoms of ^{286}Mc.

==== ^{242}Pu(^{50}Ti,pxn)^{291−x}Mc (x=2) ====
This reaction was studied by the team in Dubna in 2024. For the first time, a pxn reaction was successful with actinide targets and ^{48}Ca/^{50}Ti/^{54}Cr projectiles, producing one atom of the known ^{289}Mc in the p2n channel (evaporating one proton and two neutrons).

==== Reaction yields ====
The table below provides cross-sections and excitation energies for hot fusion reactions producing moscovium isotopes directly. Data in bold represent maxima derived from excitation function measurements. + represents an observed exit channel.

Projectile	Target	CN	2n	3n	4n	5n
^{48}Ca	^{243}Am	^{291}Mc		3.7 pb, 39.0 MeV	0.9 pb, 44.4 MeV	

=== Theoretical calculations ===
==== Decay characteristics ====
Theoretical calculations using a quantum-tunneling model support the experimental alpha-decay half-lives.

==== Evaporation residue cross sections ====
The table below contains various target-projectile combinations for which calculations have provided estimates for cross section yields from various neutron evaporation channels. The channel with the highest expected yield is given.

MD = multi-dimensional; DNS = Di-nuclear system; σ = cross section

Target	Projectile	CN	Channel (product)	σ_{max}	Model	Ref
^{243}Am	^{48}Ca	^{291}Mc	3n (^{288}Mc)	3 pb	MD	
^{243}Am	^{48}Ca	^{291}Mc	4n (^{287}Mc)	2 pb	MD	
^{243}Am	^{48}Ca	^{291}Mc	3n (^{288}Mc)	1 pb	DNS	
^{242}Am	^{48}Ca	^{290}Mc	3n (^{287}Mc)	2.5 pb	DNS	
^{241}Am	^{48}Ca	^{289}Mc	4n (^{285}Mc)	1.04 pb	DNS	
