= List of radioactive nuclides by half-life =

This is a list of radioactive nuclides (sometimes also called isotopes), ordered by half-life from shortest to longest, in seconds, minutes, hours, days and years. Current methods make it difficult to measure half-lives between approximately 10^{−19} and 10^{−10} seconds.

== 10^{−24} seconds (yoctoseconds) ==
isotope	half-life 10^{−24} seconds
hydrogen-5	86
lithium-4	91
hydrogen-4	139
nitrogen-10	143
oxygen-11	198
helium-10	260
hydrogen-6	294
lithium-5	370
fluorine-14	500
boron-7	570
nitrogen-11	585
helium-5	602
beryllium-16	650
oxygen-28	≥650
hydrogen-7	652
nitrogen-11m	690
boron-21	>760
neon-15	770
beryllium-15	790
boron-20	>912.4
fluorine-30	960

Twenty-three yoctoseconds is the time needed to traverse a 7-femtometre distance at the speed of light—around the diameter of a large atomic nucleus.

== 10^{−21} seconds (zeptoseconds) ==
isotope	half-life 10^{−21} seconds
beryllium-13	1.0
aluminium-20	>1.1
aluminium-21	>1.1
fluorine-15	1.1
sodium-18	1.34
lithium-10	2.0
oxygen-27	≥2.5
helium-9	2.5
helium-7	2.51
lithium-13	3.3
carbon-8	3.5
magnesium-18	4.0
boron-16	>4.6
beryllium-6	5.0
oxygen-25	5.18
chlorine-29	5.4
neon-16	>5.7
oxygen-12	8.9
fluorine-16	21
fluorine-28	46
boron-9	800

== 10^{−18} seconds (attoseconds) ==
isotope	half-life 10^{−18} seconds
nitrogen-9	<1
sodium-19	>1
beryllium-8	81.9

== 10^{−12} seconds (picoseconds) ==
isotope	half-life 10^{−12} seconds
oxygen-26	4.2
magnesium-19	5
argon-30	<10
potassium-31	<10
sodium-22m2	19.6

== 10^{−9} seconds (nanoseconds) ==
isotope	half-life 10^{−9} seconds
helium-2	<1
tellurium-104	7.2 (Note: This appears reliable but the NUBASE2020 value is <4 ns and the discrepancy is yet to be explained.)
lithium-12	<10
boron-18	<26
chlorine-30	<50
protactinium-219	53
sodium-37	60
protactinium-220m2	69
actinium-217	69
francium-215	86
lead-196m1	<100
uranium-236m1	100
bismuth-199m2	100
curium-247m2	100.6
actinium-218m	103
francium-214m2	103
bismuth-201m3	105
lead-202m3	107
francium-214m3	108
thorium-218	109
lead-202m2	110
neptunium-238m	112
phosphorus-26m	115
polonium-205m4	115
bismuth-201m2	118
uranium-236m2	120
lead-203m3	122
bismuth-201m4	124
astatine-213	125
lead-193m2	135
lead-198m2	137
lead-196m3	140
lead-190m1	150
thallium-198m2	150
fluorine-18m	162
americium-239m	163
lead-192m1	164
bismuth-199m3	168
magnesium-40	>170
aluminium-42	>170
aluminium-43	>170
sodium-36	180
curium-242m	180
radium-216	182
plutonium-239m1	193
bismuth-203m2	194
aluminium-32m	200
polonium-198m1	200
phosphorus-46	>200
sulfur-47	>200
sulfur-48	>200
chlorine-48	>200
chlorine-49	>200
chlorine-51	>200
argon-51	>200
polonium-202m	>200
neodymium-126	>200
polonium-203m2	>200
lead-210m	201
lead-206m2	202
bismuth-197m2	204
polonium-207m1	205
bismuth-197m5	209
silicon-34m	<210
lead-198m3	212
lead-205m3	217
polonium-206m1	222
beryllium-12m	233
thallium-205m2	235
polonium-211m2	243
sodium-22m1	243
radon-214m	245
uranium-239m1	>250
bismuth-197m4	253
fluorine-31	>260
polonium-210m	263
bismuth-197m3	263
lead-204m1	265
astatine-214m1	265
radium-208m	270
lead-196m4	270
radon-214	270
uranium-238m	280
curium-245m	290
thallium-192m2	296
polonium-212	299
protactinium-220m1	308
bismuth-202m2	310
polonium-205m1	310
plutonium-243m	330
thallium-200m2	330
silicon-44	>360
neptunium-222	380
lead-216m	400
sodium-39	>400
phosphorus-47	>400
sulfur-49	>400
chlorine-52	>400
argon-54	>400
astatine-206m	410
sulfur-43m	415
protactinium-229m	420
lead-204m3	450
lead-208m	500
bismuth-190m2	>500
curium-244m2	>500
lead-201m2	508
radium-215m3	555
astatine-214	558
berkelium-242m	600
thorium-216m2	615
chlorine-50	>620
argon-52	>620
argon-53	>620
radon-210m1	644
uranium-221	660
francium-216	700
actinium-217m	740
bismuth-195m2	750
polonium-198m2	750
lead-192m3	756
astatine-214m2	760
protactinium-220	780
uranium-239m2	780
lead-188m2	797
lead-188m1	830
radium-212m2	850
polonium-196m	850
bismuth-189m2	880
plutonium-241m1	880

== 10^{−6} seconds (microseconds) ==
isotope	half-life 10^{−6} seconds
lead-196m2	<1
polonium-192m	~1
radon-210m3	1.04
thorium-219	1.05
polonium-206m2	1.05
radon-210m2	1.06
curium-243m	1.08
actinium-218	1.08
lead-192m2	1.1
plutonium-237m2	1.1
lead-197m2	1.15
americium-241m	1.2
radium-215m2	1.39
bismuth-211m	1.4
uranium-222	1.4
neon-34	>1.5
radium-217	1.63
neptunium-223	2.15
radium-210m	2.24
radon-215	2.30
sulfur-44m	2.619
bismuth-217m	2.70
polonium-211m3	2.8
radon-209m2	3.0
bismuth-202m1	3.04
polonium-213	3.65
lead-198m1	4.19
sodium-26m	4.35
protactinium-221	4.9
nitrogen-16m	5.25
astatine-210m2	5.66
nobelium-250	5.7
lead-212m	6.0
lead-214m	6.2
bismuth-187m2	7
thorium-229m	7
radium-215m1	7.1
lead-190m3	7.2
plutonium-239m2	7.5
bismuth-206m1	7.7
astatine-205m	7.76
thorium-220	9.7
lead-195m2	10.0
lead-199m2	10.1
radium-212m1	10.9
astatine-196m2	11
actinium-219	11.8
radon-209m1	13.4
polonium-194m	15
caesium-113	16.7
francium-217	16.8
uranium-223	21
plutonium-241m2	21
fermium-251m	21.1
curium-249m	23
rutherfordium-254	23
sodium-32m	24
lead-205m1	24.2
neptunium-220	25
lead-190m2	25
radium-218	25.2
lead-189m2	26
curium-247m1	26.3
berkelium-250m1	29
nobelium-253m	31
polonium-186	34
americium-238m	35
nobelium-250m	36
neptunium-224	38
californium-249m	45
radon-216	45
rutherfordium-253	48
bismuth-185m	49
polonium-207m2	49
radium-231m	~53
uranium-219	55
berkelium-251m	58
americium-246m2	73
seaborgium-261m	92
astatine-215	100
astatine-216m	100
protactinium-218	113
lead-206m1	125
thorium-216m1	137
curium-248m	146
neptunium-219	150
astatine-212m2	152
polonium-214	164.3
radon-207m	181
bismuth-207m	182
darmstadtium-270	205
berkelium-250m2	213
darmstadtium-269	230
lead-178	230
copernicium-277	240
thorium-217	240
darmstadtium-273	240
berkelium-249m	300
astatine-216	300
bismuth-187m1	320
nihonium-278	340
hassium-265m	360
fermium-258	370
polonium-188	430
actinium-216	440
actinium-216m	443
astatine-210m1	482
caesium-112	500
polonium-187m	500
hassium-264	540
radon-217	540
polonium-205m2	645
copernicium-277	690
oganesson-294	690
fermium-241	730
hassium-263	760
fermium-242	800
bismuth-206m2	890
mendelevium-245	900
copernicium-282	910
uranium-224	940

== 10^{−3} seconds (milliseconds) ==
isotope	half-life 10^{−3} seconds
francium-218	1.0
bismuth-204m2	1.07
protactinium-217m	1.08
meitnerium-266	1.2
nobelium-258	1.2
uranium-216m	1.31
polonium-187	1.40
nihonium-278	1.4
sodium-35	1.5
radium-215	1.55
darmstadtium-271m	1.7
astatine-191	1.7
thorium-208	1.7
thorium-221	1.73
polonium-215	1.781
hassium-265	1.96
bismuth-185	2
roentgenium-272	2
astatine-191m	2.1
radium-213m	2.1
fluorine-26m	2.2
thorium-222	2.237
uranium-215	2.24
polonium-190	2.46
fluorine-29	2.5
flerovium-284	2.5
bismuth-208m	2.58
radium-202	2.6
boron-19	2.92
seaborgium-258	3
hassium-266	3.02
magnesium-38	3.1
fermium-244	3.12
protactinium-222	3.2
francium-214m1	3.35
neon-31	3.4
protactinium-217	3.48
neon-32	3.5
aluminium-41	3.5
darmstadtium-277	3.5
protactinium-211	3.8
magnesium-36	3.9
lead-179	3.9
silicon-45	~4
roentgenium-278	4
radium-203	4
seaborgium-260	4
uranium-216	4.3
lead-180	4.5
beryllium-14	4.53
radon-196	4.7
fluorine-27	5
bismuth-189m1	5.0
francium-214	5.0
meitnerium-277	5
nobelium-262	5
polonium-189	5
boron-17	5.08
protactinium-223	5.1
americium-223	5.2
sodium-34	5.5
lead-205m2	5.55
aluminium-40	5.7
neptunium-225	6
uranium-218	6
radon-195	6
radon-195m	6
carbon-22	6.2
meitnerium-270	6.3
rutherfordium-256	6.4
bismuth-184	6.6
thorium-209	7
protactinium-213	7
seaborgium-262	7
neon-30	7.22
aluminium-39	7.6
protactinium-212	8
sodium-33	8
magnesium-37	8
fluorine-26	8.2
livermorium-290	8.3
oxygen-13	8.58
lithium-11	8.75
aluminium-38	9
bohrium-262m	9.6
thorium-207	9.7
bismuth-186m	9.8
darmstadtium-270m	10
radium-219	10
boron-15	10.18
hassium-277	11
nitrogen-12	11
magnesium-35	11.3
aluminium-37	11.4
astatine-192	11.5
bohrium-261	11.8
roentgenium-274	12
boron-14	12.36
silicon-43	13
bismuth-204m1	13
livermorium-292	13
bismuth-184m	13
sodium-32	13.2
nitrogen-23	13.9
americium-242m2	14.0
protactinium-215	14
neon-29	14.7
rutherfordium-258	14.7
bismuth-186	14.8
argon-31	15
actinium-206m1	15
silicon-42	15.5
carbon-20	16
francium-199	16
sulfur-27	16.3
protactinium-214	17
sodium-31	17
thorium-210	17
boron-13	17.16
radium-220	17.9
phosphorus-44	18.5
neon-28	18.8
livermorium-291	19
radon-213	19.5
silicon-41	20
actinium-205	20
astatine-196m1	20
rutherfordium-270	20
francium-219	20
meitnerium-275	20
sodium-24m	20.18
boron-12	20.2
radon-197m	21
rutherfordium-260	21
astatine-193m1	21
californium-238	21.1
beryllium-12	21.46
francium-218m1	22.0
tennessine-293	22
polonium-191	22
aluminium-34m	22.1
nitrogen-22	23
phosphorus-45	24
francium-200	24
actinium-206	25
uranium-217	26
actinium-220	26.36
thorium-216	26.8
meitnerium-268	27
astatine-193m2	27
lawrencium-251	27
actinium-208m	28
astatine-193	28
manganese-68	28
silicon-22	28.7
sodium-28	30.5
neon-27	30.9
actinium-207	31
silicon-40	31.2
bismuth-187	32
polonium-192	32.2
astatine-217	32.3
aluminium-32	32.6
uranium-234m	33.5
curium-244m1	34
bohrium-260	35
radon-218	35
neptunium-226	35
phosphorus-42	35.8
thorium-212	36
moscovium-287	37
seaborgium-264	37
dubnium-255	37
aluminium-35	38.16
actinium-206m2	41
radium-203m	41
silicon-39	41.2
aluminium-33	41.46
silicon-23	42.3
phosphorus-26	43.6
bismuth-188	44
sodium-29	44.9
magnesium-34	44.9
lead-181	45
carbon-19	46.2
thorium-211	48
sodium-30	48.4
phosphorus-42	48.5
fluorine-25	50
sulfur-46	50
tennessine-294	51
actinium-221	52
aluminium-34	53.73
hassium-267	55
radium-207m	57
livermorium-293	57
polonium-205m3	57.4
radium-204	60
lead-182	60
uranium-225	61
silicon-38	63
radon-198	65
radon-197	66
francium-201	67
sulfur-45	68
nihonium-282	73
nihonium-283	75
oxygen-24	77.4
magnesium-32	80.4
bohrium-262	84
nitrogen-21	85
astatine-192m	88
aluminium-36	90
darmstadtium-271	90
roentgenium-279	90
magnesium-20	90.4
aluminium-22	91.1
carbon-18	92
magnesium-33	92
actinium-209	92
polonium-191m	93
oxygen-23	97
actinium-208	97
argon-32	98
copernicium-284	98
sulfur-44	100
thorium-214	100
flerovium-285	100
phosphorus-41	101
chlorine-47	101
protactinium-216	105
argon-50	106
nobelium-260	106
astatine-204m	108
neon-17	109.2
astatine-212m1	119
helium-8	119.5
magnesium-21	120
flerovium-286	120
seaborgium-263m	120
bismuth-191m	124
sulfur-28	125
carbon-9	126.5
aluminium-24m	130
nitrogen-20	136
thorium-213	140
silicon-37	141
silicon-24	143.2
polonium-216	145
astatine-195m	147
phosphorus-40	150
moscovium-288	164
actinium-215	170
argon-33	173
lithium-9	178.2
copernicium-281	180
radium-205m	180
plutonium-237m1	180
sulfur-29	188
chlorine-31	190
carbon-17	193
neon-26	197
mendelevium-247m	200
seaborgium-261	200
darmstadtium-279	210
actinium-211	213
bismuth-188m	220
radium-205	220
silicon-25	220.6
fermium-243	231
chlorine-46	232
argon-49	236
polonium-193m	240
radium-206	240
astatine-196	253
phosphorus-27	260
sulfur-43	265
uranium-226	269
magnesium-31	270
phosphorus-28	270.3
hassium-266m	280
nobelium-254m	280
phosphorus-39	282
astatine-194	286
hassium-275	290
francium-202	290
chlorine-32	298
sodium-27	301
bismuth-203m1	303
astatine-212	314
magnesium-30	317
radon-199m	320
astatine-194m	323
astatine-195	328
moscovium-289	330
nitrogen-19	336
francium-202m	340
actinium-210	350
seaborgium-266	360
fluorine-24	384
astatine-197	388
lawrencium-252	390
polonium-194	392
bismuth-200m2	400
mendelevium-245m	400
mendelevium-244	400
argon-48	415
lead-183m	415
polonium-193	420
meitnerium-274	440
aluminium-23	446
sodium-20	447.9
meitnerium-276	450
astatine-202m2	460
flerovium-287	480
lead-203m2	480
lead-184	490
silicon-36	503
hassium-273	510
neptunium-227	510
dubnium-259	510
chlorine-45	513
polonium-211	516
lead-183	535
francium-203	550
chlorine-44	560
lawrencium-253	580
thorium-223	600
bismuth-196m1	600
seaborgium-259	600
neon-25	602
nitrogen-18	619.2
radon-199	620
phosphorus-38	640
aluminium-31	644
lawrencium-257	646
moscovium-290	650
francium-200m	650
flerovium-288	660
dubnium-257m	670
bismuth-189	674
francium-206m2	700
chlorine-38m	715
actinium-213	731
carbon-16	750
boron-8	771.9
silicon-35	780
nobelium-251	780
lead-207m	806
helium-6	806.92
lithium-8	838.7
protactinium-224	844
argon-34	846.46
bohrium-265	900
bohrium-266	900
lutetium-153	900
nihonium-284	910
actinium-212	920
seaborgium-263	940
radon-200	960
bohrium-264	970

== 10^{0} seconds ==
isotope	half-life seconds	
astatine-198m	1.0	
mendelevium-246	1.0	
thorium-224	1.05	
sodium-26	1.077	
plutonium-228	1.1	
mendelevium-247	1.12	
curium-246m	1.12	
sulfur-30	1.1798	
bohrium-271	1.2	
thorium-215	1.2	
argon-47	1.23	
magnesium-29	1.3	
radium-208	1.3	
radium-207	1.3	
rutherfordium-268	1.4	
hassium-268	1.42	
polonium-217	1.47	
astatine-218	1.5	
lawrencium-253m	1.5	
fermium-259	1.5	
dubnium-260	1.52	
chlorine-34	1.5267	
dubnium-257	1.53	
fermium-246	1.54	
neon-18	1.6642	
francium-204	1.7	
francium-204m2	1.7	
nobelium-251m	1.7	
protactinium-225	1.7	
argon-35	1.7756	
americium-229	1.8	
flerovium-289	1.9	
dubnium-256	1.9	
mendelevium-249m	1.9	
dubnium-258m	1.9	
polonium-195m	1.92	
fermium-250m	1.92	
astatine-197m	2.0	
aluminium-24	2.053	
californium-237	2.1	
fluorine-23	2.23	
silicon-26	2.2453	
oxygen-22	2.25	
nobelium-252	2.27	
rutherfordium-255	2.3	
rutherfordium-262	2.3	
phosphorus-37	2.31	
carbon-15	2.449	
radium-214	2.46	
rutherfordium-259m	2.5	
chlorine-33	2.5038	
sulfur-31	2.5534	
francium-204m1	2.6	
radium-213	2.74	
silicon-34	2.77	
polonium-207m3	2.79	
nobelium-256	2.91	
chlorine-43	3.13	
bismuth-193m	3.2	
rutherfordium-259	3.2	
oxygen-21	3.42	
astatine-200m2	3.5	
aluminium-30	3.62	
radium-210	3.7	
francium-205	3.80	
radon-201m	3.8	
magnesium-22	3.8745	
radon-219	3.96	
rutherfordium-261m	4	
lead-185m	4.07	
rutherfordium-257m	4.1	
lawrencium-258	4.1	
phosphorus-29	4.102	
silicon-26	4.117	
fluorine-21	4.158	
nitrogen-17	4.173	
copernicium-283	4.2	
astatine-198	4.2	
nihonium-285	4.2	
fermium-245	4.2	
fluorine-22	4.23	
meitnerium-278	4.5	
dubnium-258	4.5	
dubnium-261	4.5	
roentgenium-280	4.6	
radium-209	4.6	
polonium-195	4.64	
rutherfordium-257	4.7	
lead-186	4.82	
actinium-222	5.0	
francium-232	5	
polonium-196	5.56	
phosphorus-36	5.6	
einsteinium-240	6	
silicon-33	6.18	
lawrencium-259	6.2	
bismuth-190m1	6.2	
lead-203m1	6.21	
bismuth-190	6.3	
lead-185	6.3	
aluminium-26m	6.346	
chlorine-42	6.8	
astatine-199	6.92	
radon-201	7.0	
mendelevium-248	7	
nitrogen-16	7.13	
aluminium-25	7.1666	
bismuth-198m2	7.7	
meitnerium-278	8	
seaborgium-265	8	
actinium-214	8.2	
argon-46	8.4	
bismuth-219	8.7	
sulfur-40	8.8	
hassium-270	9	
bismuth-220	9.5	
nihonium-286	9.5	
radon-202	9.94	
bohrium-272	10	
hassium-271	10	
einsteinium-241	10	
fluorine-20	11.0062	
magnesium-23	11.3039	
sulfur-39	11.5	
radon-229	12	
bismuth-191	12.3	
phosphorus-24	12.43	
darmstadtium-281	12.7	
radium-212	13.0	
radium-211	13	
lawrencium-254	13	
einsteinium-242	13.5	
oxygen-20	13.51	
beryllium-11	13.76	
darmstadtium-281	14	
francium-207	14.8	
lead-218	15	
lead-187	15.2	
francium-206m1	15.9	
francium-206	16	
hassium-269	16	
seaborgium-265m	16.2	
bohrium-267	17	
roentgenium-281	17	
neon-19	17.2569	
francium-231	17.6	
lead-187m	18.3	
berkelium-234	19	
francium-230	19.1	
carbon-10	19.3011	
lead-217	20	
radon-227	20.8	
einsteinium-243	21	
berkelium-233	21	
argon-45	21.48	
berkelium-236	22	
lawrencium-255	22	
sodium-21	22.49	
rutherfordium-266	23	
mendelevium-249	24	
nobelium-257	25	
polonium-211m1	25.2	
lead-188	25.5	
polonium-197m	25.8	
oxygen-19	26.47	
radon-203m	26.7	
curium-233	27	
lawrencium-256	27	
francium-220	27.4	
copernicium-285	28	
radium-221	28	
dubnium-263	29	
copernicium-285	30	
radium-234	30	
radium-233	30	
radium-221	30	
fermium-247	31	
americium-230	32	
bismuth-218	33	
bismuth-192	34.6	
francium-213	34.6	
dubnium-262	35	
fermium-248	35.1	
bismuth-215m	36.9	
einsteinium-244	37	
neon-23	37.15	
radium-222	38.0	
francium-228	38	
chlorine-41	38.4	
bismuth-192m	39.6	
polonium-220	40	
bohrium-274	40	
astatine-200	43.2	
actinium-234	44	
radon-203	44.2	
polonium-203m1	45	
polonium-212m	45.1	
hassium-271	46	
astatine-200m1	47	
phosphorus-35	47.3	
francium-226	49	
francium-209	50.0	
astatine-223	50	
francium-229	50.2	
lead-189m1	50.5	
nobelium-254	51	
lead-189	51	
curium-234	52	
mendelevium-250	52	
polonium-197	53.6	
astatine-222	54	
radon-220	55.6	
astatine-219	56	
francium-208	59.1	
sodium-25	59.1	
	minutes	seconds
californium-239	1.0	60
actinium-235	1.0	60
lead-201m1	1.02	61
bohrium-270	1.02	61
neptunium-228	1.023	61.4
actinium-222m	1.05	63
californium-240	1.06	64
fluorine-17	1.07283	64.370
radon-228	1.08	65
uranium-227	1.1	66
einsteinium-245	1.1	66
bismuth-193	1.12	67
radon-204	1.17	70
protactinium-234m	1.17	70
oxygen-14	1.17702	70.621
lead-190	1.18	71
actinium-236	1.20	72
rutherfordium-261	1.30	78
americium-232	1.32	79
lead-191	1.33	80
chlorine-40	1.35	81
seaborgium-267	1.4	84
astatine-201	1.42	85
bismuth-195m1	1.45	87
bismuth-194	1.58	95
fermium-249	1.6	96
nobelium-253	1.62	97
bismuth-217	1.642	98.5
lead-216	1.65	99
roentgenium-282	1.70	102
plutonium-230	1.70	102
radium-231	1.72	103
polonium-198	1.77	106
protactinium-226	1.8	110
berkelium-252	1.8	110
neptunium-243	1.85	111
bismuth-194m2	1.92	115
actinium-232	1.98	119
protactinium-240	2	120
plutonium-229	2.0	120
actinium-230	2.03	122
oxygen-15	2.03777	122.266
bismuth-194m1	2.08	125
actinium-223	2.10	126
bismuth-211	2.14	128
bismuth-216	2.17	130
lead-191m	2.18	131
polonium-221	2.20	132
neptunium-242	2.20	132
aluminium-28	2.245	134.7
protactinium-238	2.27	136
neptunium-244	2.29	137
mendelevium-252	2.30	138
astatine-221	2.30	138
americium-234	2.32	139
lead-215	2.34	140
berkelium-238	2.40	144
bohrium-270	2.40	144
seaborgium-271	2.40	144
actinium-233	2.42	145
francium-227	2.47	148
phosphorus-29	2.5	150
astatine-224	2.5	150
lawrencium-260	2.7	160
radon-205	2.8	170
astatine-202m1	3.03	182
bismuth-195	3.05	183
astatine-202	3.07	184
polonium-218	3.10	186
francium-211	3.10	186
nobelium-255	3.1	190
francium-210	3.18	191
americium-233	3.2	190
francium-224	3.33	200
neon-24	3.38	203
californium-242	3.49	209
lead-192	3.5	210
americium-236	3.6	220
astatine-220	3.71	223
californium-241	3.78	227
radium-229	4.0	240
mendelevium-251	4.0	240
francium-225	4.0	240
neptunium-229	4.0	240
bismuth-196m2	4.00	240
radium-232	4.2	250
polonium-199m	4.17	250
einsteinium-247	4.55	273
berkelium-241	4.6	280
neptunium-230	4.6	280
radon-225	4.66	280
berkelium-240	4.8	290
thorium-237	4.8	290
francium-221	4.9	290
curium-235	5	300
lead-193	5	300
bismuth-197m1	5.04	302
sulfur-30	5.05	303
bismuth-196	5.1	310
argon-43	5.37	322
polonium-199	5.48	329
neptunium-242m	5.5	330
radon-206	5.67	340
titanium-51	5.76	346
lead-193m1	5.8	350
aluminium-29	6.56	394
bismuth-216m	6.6	400
curium-236	6.8	410
berkelium-242	7.0	420
bismuth-212m2	7.0	420
thorium-235	7.2	430
neptunium-240m	7.22	433
astatine-203	7.37	442
radon-226	7.4	440
actinium-231	7.5	450
bismuth-215	7.6	460
einsteinium-246	7.7	460
lead-197	8.1	490
plutonium-231	8.6	520
protactinium-237	8.7	520
thorium-225	8.72	523
polonium-201m	8.9	530
protactinium-236	9.1	550
polonium-222	9.1	550
uranium-228	9.1	550
astatine-204	9.2	550
radon-207	9.25	555
bismuth-197	9.33	560
thorium-238	9.4	560
magnesium-27	9.435	566.1
copper-62	9.673	580.4
seaborgium-267	9.8	590
americium-235	9.9	590
nitrogen-13	9.965	597.9
berkelium-253	10	600
mercury-210	10	600
mendelevium-254	10	600
[free] neutron, ^{1}_{0}n	10.160	609.6
lead-213	10.2	610
bismuth-198	10.3	620
polonium-219	10.3	620
californium-243	10.7	640
polonium-200	11.5	690
bismuth-198m1	11.6	700
argon-44	11.87	712
lead-194	12.0	720
mendelevium-253	12	720
lead-199m1	12.2	730
californium-256	12.3	740
neptunium-241	13.9	830
seaborgium-269	14	840
francium-222	14.2	850
neptunium-232	14.7	880
lead-195m1	15.0	900
rutherfordium-263	15	900
lead-195	~15	~900
polonium-201	15.3	920

== 10^{3} seconds (kiloseconds) ==
isotope	half-life	
isotope	minutes	10^{3} seconds
curium-251	16.8	1.01
uranium-242	16.8	1.01
californium-244	19.4	1.16
bismuth-214	19.9	1.19
francium-212	20.0	1.20
curium-237	20	1.2
carbon-11	20.3402	1.22041
plutonium-233	20.9	1.25
thorium-233	21.83	1.310
francium-223	22.00	1.320
americium-247	23.0	1.38
uranium-239	23.45	1.407
radon-212	23.9	1.43
radon-223	24.3	1.46
radon-208	24.35	1.461
protactinium-235	24.44	1.466
bismuth-199m1	24.70	1.482
bismuth-212m1	25.0	1.50
americium-246m1	25.0	1.50
plutonium-235	25.3	1.52
einsteinium-256	25.4	1.52
radon-221	25.7	1.54
americium-244m	26	1.6
uranium-235m	26	1.6
astatine-205	26.2	1.57
lead-214	26.8	1.61
mendelevium-255	27	1.6
bismuth-199	27	1.6
einsteinium-248	27	1.6
mendelevium-254m	28	1.7
radon-209	28.5	1.71
fermium-250	30.4	1.82
thorium-226	30.57	1.834
astatine-206	30.6	1.84
bismuth-200m1	31	1.9
chlorine-34m	31.99	1.919
plutonium-232	33.7	2.02
lead-211	36.1	2.17
neptunium-233	36.2	2.17
bismuth-200	36.4	2.18
polonium-203	36.7	2.20
lead-196	37	2.2
chlorine-38	37.23	2.234
thorium-236	37.5	2.25
protactinium-227	38.3	2.30
americium-246	39	2.3
uranium-241	40	2.4
radium-227	42.2	2.53
lead-197m1	42.9	2.57
lawrencium-261	44	2.6
polonium-202	44.7	2.68
californium-245	45.0	2.70
bismuth-213	45.59	2.735
neptunium-231	48.8	2.93
mercury-191	49	2.9
berkelium-251	55.6	3.34
chlorine-39	56.2	3.37
mendelevium-258m	57.0	3.42
uranium-229	58	3.5
nobelium-259	58	3.5
bismuth-201m1	59.1	3.55
	hours	10^{3} seconds
dubnium-270	1.0	3.6
bismuth-212	1.0092	3.633
neptunium-240	1.032	3.72
actinium-229	1.045	3.76
curium-249	1.0692	3.849
lead-204m2	1.12	4.0
gallium-68	1.1285	4.063
americium-237	1.22	4.4
mendelevium-256	1.283	4.62
rutherfordium-267	1.3	4.7
dubnium-266	1.33	4.8
californium-255	1.417	5.10
lead-199	1.50	5.4
radium-230	1.55	5.6
mendelevium-259	1.60	5.8
americium-238	1.63	5.9
astatine-208	1.63	5.9
polonium-205|	1.66	6.0
einsteinium-249	1.703	6.13
bismuth-202	1.72	6.2
astatine-207	1.80	6.5
bismuth-201	1.80	6.5
protactinium-239	1.8	6.5
argon-41	1.82683	109.610
fluorine-18	1.8289	6.584
americium-245	2.05	7.4
einsteinium-250m	2.22	8.0
radon-210	2.4	8.6
lead-198	2.4	8.6
curium-238	2.4	8.6
curium-239	2.5	9.0
silicon-31	2.6193	9.429
fermium-256	2.627	9.46
yttrium-85	2.68	9.6
actinium-224	2.78	10.0
sulfur-30	2.8383	10.218
californium-247	3.11	11.2
berkelium-250	3.212	11.56
fermium-254	3.240	11.66
lead-209	3.253	11.71
lead-202m1	3.53	12.7
polonium-204	3.53	12.7
lawrencium-262	3.6	13
berkelium-244	4.35	15.7
berkelium-243	4.5	16
dubnium-267	4.6	17
plutonium-243	4.956	17.84
fermium-251	5.30	19.1
polonium-207	5.80	20.9
astatine-209	5.41	19.5
mendelevium-257	5.52	19.9
actinium-228	6.13	22.1
dysprosium-153	6.4	23
protactinium-234	6.70	24.1
astatine-211	7.214	25.97
einsteinium-256m	7.6	27
astatine-210	8.1	29
einsteinium-250	8.6	31
plutonium-234	8.8	32
lead-201	9.33	33.6
americium-244	10.1	36
erbium-165	10.36	37.3
plutonium-245	10.5	38
lead-212	10.64	38.3
lawrencium-266	11	40
bismuth-204	11.22	40.4
bismuth-203	11.76	42.3
americium-239	11.9	43
uranium-240	14.1	51
radon-211	14.6	53
sodium-24	14.96	53.9
americium-242	16.02	57.7
fermium-255	20.07	72.3
magnesium-18	20.915	75.29
lead-200	21.5	77
protactinium-228	22	79
neptunium-236m	22.5	81
berkelium-248m	23.7	85
	days	10^{3} seconds
fermium-252	1.058	91.4
thorium-231	1.0634	91.88
dubnium-268	1.283	110.9
erbium-160	1.191	102.9
actinium-226	1.2238	105.74
protactinium-232	1.31	113
einsteinium-251	1.375	118.8
californium-246	1.4875	128.52
protactinium-229	1.50	130
berkelium-246	1.80	156
neptunium-238	2.117	182.9
americium-240	2.117	182.9
lead-203	2.16138	186.743
plutonium-247	2.27	196
terbium-153	2.34	202
neptunium-239	2.356	203.6
gold-198	2.695	232.8
fermium-253	3.00	259
gold-199	3.169	273.8
radium-224	3.6319	313.80
radon-222	3.8235	330.35
uranium-231	4.16	359
iodine-124	4.17	360
neptunium-234	4.4	380
calcium-47	4.536	391.9
berkelium-245	4.94	427
bismuth-210	5.012	433.0
manganese-52	5.591	483.1
gold-196	6.183	534.2
bismuth-206	6.243	539.4
uranium-237	6.75	583
einsteinium-257	7.7	670
iodine-131	8.02	693
polonium-206	8.8	760
thulium-167	9.25	799
gadolinium-149	9.28	802
actinium-225	10.0	860
plutonium-246	10.84	937
radium-223	11.43	988

== 10^{6} seconds (megaseconds) ==
isotope	half-life	
isotope	days	10^{6} seconds
phosphorus-32	14.269	1.2328
radium-225	14.9	1.29
bismuth-205	15.31	1.323
vanadium-48	15.9735	1.38011
protactinium-230	17.4	1.50
californium-253	17.81	1.539
thorium-227	18.68	1.614
einsteinium-253	20.47	1.769
uranium-230	20.8	1.80
thorium-234	24.10	2.082
phosphorus-33	25.35	2.190
protactinium-233	26.975	2.3306
curium-240	27	2.3
chromium-51	27.7025	2.39350
mendelevium-260	27.8	2.40
curium-241	32.8	2.83
einsteinium-255	39.8	3.44
plutonium-237	45.2	3.91
mendelevium-258	51.5	4.45
beryllium-7	53.22	4.598
californium-254	60.5	5.23
cobalt-56	77.27	6.676
scandium-46	83.79	7.239
sulfur-35	87.37	7.549
thulium-168	93.1	8.04
fermium-257	100.5	8.68
thulium-170	128.6	11.11
polonium-210	138.376	11.9557
calcium-45	162.7	14.06
curium-242	162.8	14.07
gold-195	186.1	16.08
gadolinium-153	240.4	20.77
zinc-65	243.7	21.06
cobalt-57	271.79	23.483
einsteinium-254	275.7	23.82
vanadium-49	330	29
berkelium-249	330	29
californium-248	333.5	28.81
samarium-145	340	29
	years	10^{6} seconds
ruthenium-106	1.023	32.3
neptunium-235	1.0845	34.22
cadmium-109	1.267	40.0
einsteinium-252	1.2915	40.76
thorium-228	1.9116	60.33
thulium-171	1.92	61
caesium-134	2.0652	65.17
sodium-22	2.602	82.1
californium-252	2.645	83.5
iron-55	2.756	87.0
plutonium-236	2.858	90.2
polonium-208	2.898	91.5
rhodium-101	3.3	100
cobalt-60	5.2714	166.35
radium-228	5.75	181
barium-133	10.74	339
krypton-85	10.756	339.4
hydrogen-3 (also known as tritium)	12.32	389
californium-250	13.08	413
plutonium-241	14.290	451.0
niobium-93m	16.13	509
promethium-145	17.711	558.9
curium-244	18.10	571
actinium-227	21.772	687.1
lead-210	22.3	700
strontium-90	28.79	909
curium-243	29.1	920
caesium-137	30.17	952

== 10^{9} seconds (gigaseconds) ==
isotope	half-life	
isotope	years	10^{9} seconds
argon-42	32.11	1.013
bismuth-207	32.9	1.04
titanium-44	63	2.0
uranium-232	68.9	2.17
gadolinium-148	86.9	2.74
plutonium-238	87.7	2.77
samarium-151	96.6	3.05
nickel-63	100.1	3.16
polonium-209	125.2	3.95
americium-242m1	141	4.4
silicon-32	157	5.0
berkelium-248	>300	>9.5
argon-39	302	9.5
californium-249	351	11.1
silver-108m	418	13.2
americium-241	432.2	13.64
mercury-194	444	14.0
niobium-91	680	21
californium-251	900	28
holmium-166m1	1,200	38
berkelium-247	1,380	44
radium-226	1,600	50
molybdenum-93	4,000	130
holmium-163	4,570	144
curium-246	4,760	150
carbon-14 (Note: Used in radiocarbon dating.)	5,700	180
plutonium-240	6,561	207.0
thorium-229	7,340	232
americium-243	7,370	233
curium-250	8,300	260
curium-245	8,500	270
niobium-94	20,300	640
plutonium-239	24,110	761

== 10^{12} seconds (teraseconds) ==
isotope	half-life	
isotope	millennia	10^{12} seconds
protactinium-231	32.76	1.034
lead-202	52.5	1.66
lanthanum-137	60	1.9
thorium-230	75.38	2.379
nickel-59	76	2.4
calcium-41	103	3.3
neptunium-236	154	4.9
uranium-233	159.2	5.02
rhenium-186m	200	6.3
technetium-99	211.1	6.66
krypton-81	229	7.2
tin-126	230	7.3
uranium-234	245.5	7.75
chlorine-36	301.3	9.51
selenium-79	327	10.3
curium-248	348	11.0
bismuth-208	368	11.6
plutonium-242	375	11.8
aluminium-26	717	22.6
	10^{6} years	10^{12} seconds
beryllium-10	1.387	43.8
zirconium-93	1.53	48
gadolinium-150	1.79	56
neptunium-237	2.144	67.7
caesium-135	2.3	73
iron-60	2.6	82
technetium-97	2.6	82
dysprosium-154	3.0	95
bismuth-210m	3.04	96
manganese-53	3.7	120
technetium-98	4.2	130
palladium-107	6.5	210
hafnium-182	8.9	280
lead-205	17.3	550
curium-247	15.6	490
iodine-129	15.7	500
uranium-236	23.42	739

== 10^{15} seconds (petaseconds) ==
isotope	half-life	
isotope	10^{6} years	10^{15} seconds
niobium-92	34.724	1.0958
plutonium-244	81.33	2.567
samarium-146	92.026	2.9041
uranium-235	703.8	22.21
	10^{9} years	10^{15} seconds
potassium-40	1.251	39.5
uranium-238	4.468	141.0
thorium-232	14.05	443

== 10^{18} seconds (exaseconds) ==
isotope	half-life	
isotope	10^{9} years	10^{18} seconds
lutetium-176	37.64	1.188
rhenium-187	41.22	1.301
rubidium-87	49.72	1.569
lanthanum-138	102.1	3.22
samarium-147	106.1	3.35
platinum-190	483	15.2

== 10^{21} seconds (zettaseconds) ==
isotope	half-life	
isotope	10^{12} years	10^{21} seconds
osmium-184	11.2	0.35
gadolinium-152	108	3.4
indium-115	441	13.9
	10^{15} years	10^{21} seconds
osmium-186	2.002	63.2
neodymium-144	2.292	72.3
samarium-148	7.005	221.1
cadmium-113	7.7	240

== 10^{24} seconds (yottaseconds) ==
isotope	half-life	
isotope	10^{15} years	10^{24} seconds
hafnium-174	70	2.2
vanadium-50	140	4.4
	10^{18} years	10^{24} seconds
tungsten-180	1.801	56.8
europium-151	5.004	157.9
molybdenum-100	7.804	246.3
neodymium-150	7.905	249.5
tellurium-130	8.806	277.9
zirconium-96	20	630
bismuth-209	20.1	630
calcium-48	23.01	726
cadmium-116	31.02	979

== 10^{27} seconds (ronnaseconds) ==
isotope	half-life	
isotope	10^{21} years	10^{27} seconds
selenium-82	0.0975	3.08
barium-130	1.2	38
germanium-76	1.8	57
xenon-136	2.165	68.3
krypton-78	9.2	290
xenon-124	18	570

== 10^{30} seconds (quettaseconds) ==
isotope	half-life	
isotope	10^{24} years	10^{30} seconds
tellurium-128	2.25	71

The half-life of tellurium-128 is over 160 trillion times greater than the age of the universe, which is 4.35×10^{17} seconds.

== See also ==
- List of elements by stability of isotopes
- List of nuclides
- Orders of magnitude (time)
- Lists of isotopes, by element
