= Isotopes of dubnium =

Isotopes of dubnium (_{105}Db)
Main isotopes			Decay	
Isotope	abundance	half-life (t_{1/2})	mode	product
^{262}Db	synth	34 s	α67%	^{258}Lr
^{262}Db	synth	34 s	SF33%	–
^{263}Db	synth	27 s	SF56%	–
^{263}Db	synth	27 s	α41%	^{259}Lr
^{263}Db	synth	27 s	ε3%	^{263m}Rf
^{266}Db	synth	11 min	SF	–
^{266}Db	synth	11 min	ε	^{266}Rf
^{267}Db	synth	1.4 h	SF	–
^{268}Db	synth	16 h	α51%	^{264}Lr
^{268}Db	synth	16 h	SF49%	–
^{270}Db	synth	1 h	α87%	^{266}Lr
^{270}Db	synth	1 h	SF13%	–

Dubnium (_{105}Db) is a synthetic element, thus a standard atomic weight cannot be given. Like all synthetic elements, it has no stable isotopes. The first isotope to be synthesized was ^{261}Db in 1968. Thirteen radioisotopes are known, ranging from ^{255}Db to ^{270}Db (except ^{264}Db, ^{265}Db, and ^{269}Db), along with one isomer (^{257m}Db); two more isomers have been reported but are unconfirmed. The longest-lived known isotope is ^{268}Db with a half-life of 16 hours.

== List of isotopes ==
Nuclide (Note: ^{m}Db – Excited nuclear isomer.)	Z	N	Isotopic mass (Da) (Note: ( ) – Uncertainty (1σ) is given in concise form in parentheses after the corresponding last digits.) (Note: # – Atomic mass marked #: value and uncertainty derived not from purely experimental data, but at least partly from trends from the Mass Surface (TMS).)	Discovery year	Half-life	Decay mode (Note: Modes of decay: IT: / Isomeric transition; SF: / Spontaneous fission)	Daughter isotope	Spin and parity (Note: ( ) spin value – Indicates spin with weak assignment arguments.)
Nuclide	Excitation energy (Note: # – Values marked # are not purely derived from experimental data, but at least partly from trends of neighboring nuclides (TNN).)			Discovery year	Half-life	Decay mode	Daughter isotope	Spin and parity
^{255}Db	105	150	255.10692(30)#	2024	54 ms	SF (67%)	(various)	9/2+#
^{255}Db	105	150	255.10692(30)#	2024	54 ms	α (?%)	^{251}Lr	9/2+#
^{255m}Db (Note: Order of ground state and isomer is uncertain.)	100(100)# keV			(1976) (Note: No evidence for two different states in ^{255}Db)	2.6+0.4 −0.3 ms	SF (92%)	(various)	1/2−#
^{255m}Db	100(100)# keV			(1976)	2.6+0.4 −0.3 ms	α (8%)	^{251}Lr	1/2−#
^{256}Db	105	151	256.10767(20)#	2001	1.6+0.5 −0.3 s [1.7(4) s]	α (70%)	^{252}Lr	9−#
^{256}Db	105	151	256.10767(20)#	2001	1.6+0.5 −0.3 s [1.7(4) s]	β^{+} (30%)	^{256}Rf	9−#
^{257}Db	105	152	257.10752(18)#	1985	2.3(2) s	α (>94%)	^{253}Lr	9/2+#
^{257}Db	105	152	257.10752(18)#	1985	2.3(2) s	SF (<6%)	(various)	9/2+#
^{257m1}Db	140(110)# keV			1985	0.67(6) s	α (>87%)	^{253}Lr	(1/2−)
^{257m1}Db	140(110)# keV			1985	0.67(6) s	SF (<13%)	(various)	(1/2−)
^{257m2}Db	>1100 keV			2025	0.71+29 −18 ms	IT	^{257}Db	
^{258}Db	105	153	258.10897(10)	1981	2.17(36) s	α (64%)	^{254}Lr	(0−)
^{258}Db	105	153	258.10897(10)	1981	2.17(36) s	β^{+} (36%)	^{258}Rf	(0−)
^{258m}Db	53(14) keV			2009	4.41(21) s	α (77%)	^{254}Lr	5+#
^{258m}Db	53(14) keV			2009	4.41(21) s	β^{+} (23%)	^{258}Rf	5+#
^{259}Db	105	154	259.10949(6)	2001	0.51(16) s	α	^{255}Lr	9/2+#
^{260}Db	105	155	260.11130(10)#	1970	1.52(13) s	α (90.4%)	^{256}Lr	
^{260}Db	105	155	260.11130(10)#	1970	1.52(13) s	SF (9.6%)	(various)	
^{260}Db	105	155	260.11130(10)#	1970	1.52(13) s	β^{+}?	^{260}Rf	
^{260m}Db (Note: Existence of this isomer is unconfirmed)				(2004) (Note: Existence not included in the National Nuclear Data Center evaluations)	19+25 −7 s	α	^{256}Lr	
^{261}Db	105	156	261.11198(12)#	1970	4.7(1.0) s	SF (73%)	(various)	9/2+#
^{261}Db	105	156	261.11198(12)#	1970	4.7(1.0) s	α (27%)	^{257}Lr	9/2+#
^{262}Db	105	157	262.11407(15)#	1971	33.8+4.4 −3.5 s [34(4) s]	SF (52%)	(various)	
^{262}Db	105	157	262.11407(15)#	1971	33.8+4.4 −3.5 s [34(4) s]	α (48%)	^{258}Lr	
^{263}Db	105	158	263.11499(18)#	1992	27+10 −7 s [29(9) s]	SF (56%)	(various)	9/2+#
^{263}Db	105	158	263.11499(18)#	1992	27+10 −7 s [29(9) s]	α (37%)	^{259}Lr	9/2+#
^{263}Db	105	158	263.11499(18)#	1992	27+10 −7 s [29(9) s]	β^{+} (6.9%) (Note: Heaviest nuclide for which beta decay has been observed.)	^{263}Rf	9/2+#
^{266}Db (Note: Not directly synthesized, occurs in the decay chain of ^{282}Nh)	105	161	266.12103(30)#	2007	11+21 −4 min	SF	(various)	
^{266}Db	105	161	266.12103(30)#	2007	11+21 −4 min	EC?	^{266}Rf	
^{267}Db (Note: Not directly synthesized, occurs in the decay chain of ^{287}Mc)	105	162	267.12240(40)#	2004	1.4+1.0 −0.4 h	SF	(various)	9/2+#
^{267}Db	105	162	267.12240(40)#	2004	1.4+1.0 −0.4 h	EC?	^{267}Rf	9/2+#
^{268}Db (Note: Not directly synthesized, occurs in the decay chain of ^{288}Mc)	105	163	268.12567(57)#	2004	16+6 −4 h	α (51%)	^{264}Lr	
^{268}Db	105	163	268.12567(57)#	2004	16+6 −4 h	SF (49%)	(various)	
^{268}Db	105	163	268.12567(57)#	2004	16+6 −4 h	EC?	^{268}Rf	
^{270}Db (Note: Not directly synthesized, occurs in the decay chain of ^{294}Ts)	105	165	270.1340(62)#	2010	1.0+1.5 −0.4 h [1.7(1.0) h]	SF (~87%)	(various)	
^{270}Db	105	165	270.1340(62)#	2010	1.0+1.5 −0.4 h [1.7(1.0) h]	α (~13%)	^{266}Lr	
^{270}Db	105	165	270.1340(62)#	2010	1.0+1.5 −0.4 h [1.7(1.0) h]	EC?	^{270}Rf	
This table header & footer:

== Nucleosynthesis history ==
Target	Projectile	CN	Attempt result
^{205}Tl	^{54}Cr	^{259}Db	Successful reaction
^{208}Pb	^{51}V	^{259}Db	Successful reaction
^{207}Pb	^{51}V	^{258}Db	Successful reaction
^{206}Pb	^{51}V	^{257}Db	Successful reaction
^{209}Bi	^{50}Ti	^{259}Db	Successful reaction
^{209}Bi	^{49}Ti	^{258}Db	Successful reaction
^{209}Bi	^{48}Ti	^{257}Db	Successful reaction
^{232}Th	^{31}P	^{263}Db	Successful reaction
^{238}U	^{27}Al	^{265}Db	Successful reaction
^{236}U	^{27}Al	^{263}Db	Successful reaction
^{244}Pu	^{23}Na	^{267}Db	Reaction yet to be attempted
^{243}Am	^{22}Ne	^{265}Db	Successful reaction
^{241}Am	^{22}Ne	^{263}Db	Successful reaction
^{248}Cm	^{19}F	^{267}Db	Successful reaction
^{249}Bk	^{18}O	^{267}Db	Successful reaction
^{249}Bk	^{16}O	^{265}Db	Successful reaction
^{250}Cf	^{15}N	^{265}Db	Successful reaction
^{249}Cf	^{15}N	^{264}Db	Successful reaction
^{254}Es	^{13}C	^{267}Db	Failure to date

=== Cold fusion ===
This section deals with the synthesis of nuclei of dubnium by so-called "cold" fusion reactions. These are processes which create compound nuclei at low excitation energy (~10–20 MeV, hence "cold"), leading to a higher probability of survival from fission. The excited nucleus then decays to the ground state via the emission of one or two neutrons only.

^{209}Bi(^{50}Ti,xn)^{259−x}Db (x=1,2,3)

The first attempts to synthesise dubnium using cold fusion reactions were performed in 1976 by the team at FLNR, Dubna using the above reaction. They were able to detect a 5 s spontaneous fission (SF) activity which they assigned to ^{257}Db. This assignment was later corrected to ^{258}Db. In 1981, the team at GSI studied this reaction using the improved technique of correlation of genetic parent-daughter decays. They were able to positively identify^{258}Db, the product from the 1n neutron evaporation channel. In 1983, the team at Dubna revisited the reaction using the method of identification of a descendant using chemical separation. They succeeded in measuring alpha decays from known descendants of the decay chain beginning with ^{258}Db. This was taken as providing some evidence for the formation of dubnium nuclei. The team at GSI revisited the reaction in 1985 and were able to detect 10 atoms of ^{257}Db. After a significant upgrade of their facilities in 1993, in 2000 the team measured 120 decays of ^{257}Db, 16 decays of ^{256}Db and decay of^{258}Db in the measurement of the 1n, 2n and 3n excitation functions. The data gathered for ^{257}Db allowed a first spectroscopic study of this isotope and identified an isomer, ^{257m}Db, and a first determination of a decay level structure for ^{257}Db. The reaction was used in spectroscopic studies of isotopes of mendelevium and einsteinium in 2003–2004.

^{209}Bi(^{49}Ti,xn)^{258−x}Db (x=2?)

This reaction was studied by Yuri Oganessian and the team at Dubna in 1983. They observed a 2.6 s SF activity tentatively assigned to ^{256}Db. Later results suggest a possible reassignment to ^{256}Rf, resulting from the ~30% EC branch in ^{256}Db.

^{209}Bi(^{48}Ti,xn)^{257−x}Db (x=1?,2)

This reaction was studied by Yuri Oganessian and the team at Dubna in 1983. They observed a 1.6 s activity with a ~80% alpha branch with a ~20% SF branch. The activity was tentatively assigned to ^{255}Db. Later results suggest a reassignment to ^{256}Db. In 2005, the team at the University of Jyväskylä studied this reaction. They observed three atoms of ^{255}Db with a cross section of 40 pb.

^{208}Pb(^{51}V,xn)^{259−x}Db (x=1,2)

The team at Dubna also studied this reaction in 1976 and were again able to detect the 5 s SF activity, first tentatively assigned to ^{257}Db and later to^{258}Db. In 2006, the team at LBNL reinvestigated this reaction as part of their odd-Z projectile program. They were able to detect ^{258}Db and ^{257}Db in their measurement of the 1n and 2n neutron evaporation channels.

^{207}Pb(^{51}V,xn)^{258−x}Db

The team at Dubna also studied this reaction in 1976 but this time they were unable to detect the 5 s SF activity, first tentatively assigned to ^{257}Db and later to ^{258}Db. Instead, they were able to measure a 1.5 s SF activity, tentatively assigned to ^{255}Db.

^{206}Pb(^{51}V,xn)^{257−x}Db (x=2)

This reaction was studied in 2024; ^{255}Db was observed.

^{205}Tl(^{54}Cr,xn)^{259−x}Db (x=1?)

The team at Dubna also studied this reaction in 1976 and were again able to detect the 5 s SF activity, first tentatively assigned to ^{257}Db and later to ^{258}Db.

=== Hot fusion ===
This section deals with the synthesis of nuclei of dubnium by so-called "hot" fusion reactions. These are processes which create compound nuclei at high excitation energy (~40–50 MeV, hence "hot"), leading to a reduced probability of survival from fission and quasi-fission. The excited nucleus then decays to the ground state via the emission of 3–5 neutrons.

^{232}Th(^{31}P,xn)^{263−x}Db (x=5)

There are very limited reports that this reaction using a phosphorus-31 beam was studied in 1989 by Andreyev et al. at the FLNR. One source suggests that no atoms were detected whilst a better source from the Russians themselves indicates that ^{258}Db was synthesised in the 5n channel with a yield of 120 pb.

^{238}U(^{27}Al,xn)^{265−x}Db (x=4,5)

In 2006, as part of their study of the use of uranium targets in superheavy element synthesis, the LBNL team led by Ken Gregorich studied the excitation functions for the 4n and 5n channels in this new reaction.

^{236}U(^{27}Al,xn)^{263−x}Db (x=5,6)

This reaction was first studied by Andreyev et al. at the FLNR, Dubna in 1992. They were able to observe ^{258}Db and ^{257}Db in the 5n and 6n exit channels with yields of 450 pb and 75 pb, respectively.

^{243}Am(^{22}Ne,xn)^{265−x}Db (x=5)

The first attempts to synthesis dubnium were performed in 1968 by the team at the Flerov Laboratory of Nuclear Reactions (FLNR) in Dubna, Russia. They observed two alpha lines which they tentatively assigned to ^{261}Db and ^{260}Db. They repeated their experiment in 1970 looking for spontaneous fission. They found a 2.2 s SF activity which they assigned to ^{261}Db. In 1970, the Dubna team began work on using gradient thermochromatography in order to detect dubnium in chemical experiments as a volatile chloride. In their first run they detected a volatile SF activity with similar adsorption properties to NbCl_{5} and unlike HfCl_{4}. This was taken to indicate the formation of nuclei of dvi-niobium as DbCl_{5}. In 1971, they repeated the chemistry experiment using higher sensitivity and observed alpha decays from an dvi-niobium component, taken to confirm the formation of ^{260}105. The method was repeated in 1976 using the formation of bromides and obtained almost identical results, indicating the formation of a volatile, dvi-niobium-like DbBr_{5}.

^{241}Am(^{22}Ne,xn)^{263−x}Db (x=4,5)

In 2000, Chinese scientists at the Institute of Modern Physics (IMP), Lanzhou, announced the discovery of the previously unknown isotope ^{259}Db formed in the 4n neutron evaporation channel. They were also able to confirm the decay properties for ^{258}Db.

^{248}Cm(^{19}F,xn)^{267−x}Db (x=4,5)

This reaction was first studied in 1999 at the Paul Scherrer Institute (PSI) in order to produce ^{262}Db for chemical studies. Just 4 atoms were detected with a cross section of 260 pb. Japanese scientists at JAERI studied the reaction further in 2002 and determined yields for the isotope ^{262}Db during their efforts to study the aqueous chemistry of dubnium.

^{249}Bk(^{18}O,xn)^{267−x}Db (x=4,5)

Following from the discovery of ^{260}Db by Albert Ghiorso in 1970 at the University of California (UC), the same team continued in 1971 with the discovery of the new isotope ^{262}Db. They also observed an unassigned 25 s SF activity, probably associated with the now-known SF branch of ^{263}Db. In 1990, a team led by Kratz at LBNL definitively discovered the new isotope ^{263}Db in the 4n neutron evaporation channel. This reaction has been used by the same team on several occasions in order to attempt to confirm an electron capture (EC) branch in ^{263}Db leading to long-lived ^{263}Rf (see rutherfordium).

^{249}Bk(^{16}O,xn)^{265−x}Db (x=4)

Following from the discovery of ^{260}Db by Albert Ghiorso in 1970 at the University of California (UC), the same team continued in 1971 with the discovery of the new isotope ^{261}Db.

^{250}Cf(^{15}N,xn)^{265−x}Db (x=4)

Following from the discovery of ^{260}Db by Ghiorso in 1970 at LBNL, the same team continued in 1971 with the discovery of the new isotope ^{261}Db.

^{249}Cf(^{15}N,xn)^{264−x}Db (x=4)

In 1970, the team at the Lawrence Berkeley National Laboratory (LBNL) studied this reaction and identified the isotope ^{260}Db in their discovery experiment. They used the modern technique of correlation of genetic parent-daughter decays to confirm their assignment. In 1977, the team at Oak Ridge repeated the experiment and were able to confirm the discovery by the identification of K X-rays from the daughter lawrencium.

^{254}Es(^{13}C,xn)^{267−x}Db

In 1988, scientists as the Lawrence Livermore National Laboratory (LLNL) used the asymmetric hot fusion reaction with an einsteinium-254 target to search for the new nuclides ^{264}Db and ^{263}Db. Due to the low sensitivity of the experiment caused by the small ^{254}Es target, they were unable to detect any evaporation residues (ER).

=== Decay of heavier nuclides ===
Isotopes of dubnium have also been identified in the decay of heavier elements. Observations to date are summarised in the table below:

Evaporation residue	Observed dubnium isotope
^{294}Ts	^{270}Db
^{288}Mc	^{268}Db
^{287}Mc	^{267}Db
^{286}Mc, ^{282}Nh	^{266}Db
^{267}Bh	^{263}Db
^{278}Nh, ^{266}Bh	^{262}Db
^{265}Bh	^{261}Db
^{272}Rg	^{260}Db
^{266}Mt, ^{262}Bh	^{258}Db
^{261}Bh	^{257}Db
^{260}Bh	^{256}Db

== Isomerism ==
=== ^{260}Db ===
Recent data on the decay of ^{272}Rg has revealed that some decay chains continue through ^{260}Db with extraordinary longer life-times than expected. These decays have been linked to an isomeric level decaying by alpha decay with a half-life of ~19 s. Further research is required to allow a definite assignment.

=== ^{258}Db ===
Evidence for an isomeric state in ^{258}Db has been gathered from the study of the decay of ^{266}Mt and ^{262}Bh. It has been noted that those decays assigned to an electron capture (EC) branch has a significantly different half-life to those decaying by alpha emission. This has been taken to suggest the existence of an isomeric state decaying by EC with a half-life of ~20 s. Further experiments are required to confirm this assignment.

=== ^{257}Db ===
A study of the formation and decay of ^{257}Db has proved the existence of an isomeric state. Initially, ^{257}Db was taken to decay by alpha emission with energies 9.16, 9.07 and 8.97 MeV. A measurement of the correlations of these decays with those of ^{253}Lr have shown that the 9.16 MeV decay belongs to a separate isomer. Analysis of the data in conjunction with theory have assigned this activity to a meta stable state, ^{257m}Db. The ground state decays by alpha emission with energies 9.07 and 8.97 MeV. Spontaneous fission of ^{257m,g}Db was not confirmed in recent experiments.

== Spectroscopic decay level schemes ==
=== ^{257}Db ===
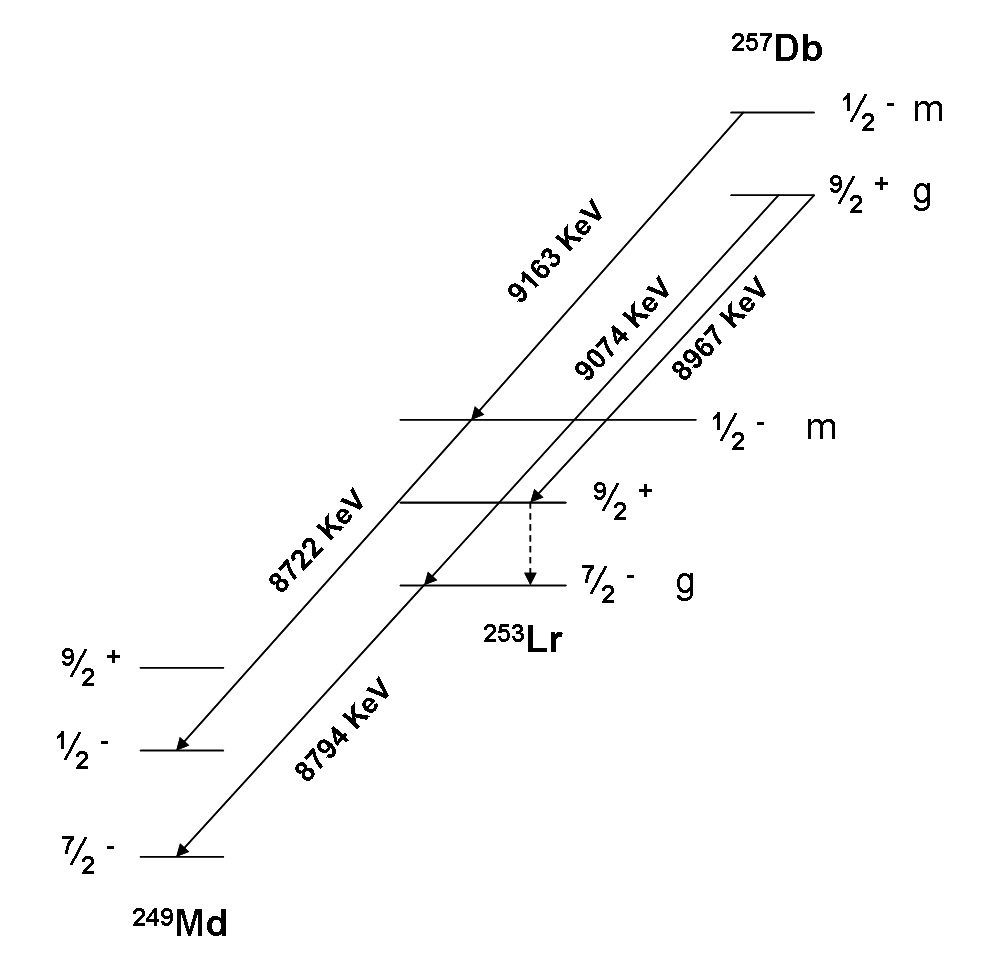
This is the currently suggested decay level scheme for ^{257}Db^{g,m} from the study performed in 2001 by Hessberger et al. at GSI

== Chemical yields of isotopes ==
=== Cold fusion ===
The table below provides cross-sections and excitation energies for cold fusion reactions producing dubnium isotopes directly. Data in bold represents maxima derived from excitation function measurements. + represents an observed exit channel.

Projectile	Target	CN	1n	2n	3n
^{51}V	^{208}Pb	^{259}Db	**1.54 nb, 15.6 MeV**	**1.8 nb, 23.7 MeV**	
^{50}Ti	^{209}Bi	^{259}Db	**4.64 nb, 16.4 MeV**	**2.4 nb, 22.3 MeV**	200 pb, 31.0 MeV

=== Hot fusion ===
The table below provides cross-sections and excitation energies for hot fusion reactions producing dubnium isotopes directly. Data in bold represents maxima derived from excitation function measurements. + represents an observed exit channel.

Projectile	Target	CN	3n	4n	5n
^{27}Al	^{238}U	^{265}Db		+	+
^{22}Ne	^{241}Am	^{263}Db		1.6 nb	3.6 nb
^{22}Ne	^{243}Am	^{265}Db		+	+
^{19}F	^{248}Cm	^{267}Db			1.0 nb
^{18}O	^{249}Bk	^{267}Db		10.0 nb	6.0 nb
