= Isotopes of nobelium =

Isotopes of nobelium (_{102}No)
Main isotopes			Decay	
Isotope	abundance	half-life (t_{1/2})	mode	product
^{253}No	synth	1.6 min	α55%	^{249}Fm
^{253}No	synth	1.6 min	β^{+}45%	^{253}Md
^{254}No	synth	51 s	α90%	^{250}Fm
^{254}No	synth	51 s	β^{+}10%	^{254}Md
^{255}No	synth	3.5 min	α61%	^{251}Fm
^{255}No	synth	3.5 min	β^{+}39%	^{255}Md
^{257}No	synth	25 s	α99%	^{253}Fm
^{257}No	synth	25 s	β^{+}1%	^{257}Md
^{259}No	synth	58 min	α75%	^{255}Fm
^{259}No	synth	58 min	ε25%	^{259}Md
^{259}No	synth	58 min	SF<10%	–

Nobelium (_{102}No) is a synthetic element, and thus a standard atomic weight cannot be given. Like all synthetic elements, it has no stable isotopes. The first isotope to be synthesized (and correctly identified) was ^{254}No in 1966. There are fourteen known radioisotopes, which are ^{248}No to ^{260}No and ^{262}No, and many isomers. The longest-lived isotope is ^{259}No with a half-life of 58 minutes. The longest-lived isomer is ^{251m1}No with a half-life of 1.02 seconds.

== List of isotopes ==
Nuclide (Note: ^{m}No – Excited nuclear isomer.)	Z	N	Isotopic mass (Da) (Note: ( ) – Uncertainty (1σ) is given in concise form in parentheses after the corresponding last digits.) (Note: # – Atomic mass marked #: value and uncertainty derived not from purely experimental data, but at least partly from trends from the Mass Surface (TMS).)	Discovery year	Half-life	Decay mode (Note: Modes of decay: EC: / Electron capture; IT: / Isomeric transition; SF: / Spontaneous fission)	Daughter isotope	Spin and parity (Note: ( ) spin value – Indicates spin with weak assignment arguments.) (Note: # – Values marked # are not purely derived from experimental data, but at least partly from trends of neighboring nuclides (TNN).)
Nuclide	Excitation energy			Discovery year	Half-life	Decay mode	Daughter isotope	Spin and parity
^{248}No	102	146	248.08662(24)#	(2003) (Note: Only upper limit of half-life reported, not included in discovery database)	<2 μs	SF ?	(various)	0+
^{249}No	102	147	249.0878(3)#	2021	38.3(28) ms	α	^{245}Fm	5/2+#
^{250}No	102	148	250.08757(22)#	2001	4.0(4) μs	SF	(various)	0+
^{250m1}No	~1250 keV			2003	23(4) μs	IT	^{250}No	(6+)
^{250m2}No				2022	0.7+1.4 −0.3 μs	IT	^{250m1}No	
^{251}No	102	149	251.088945(4)	1967	0.80(1) s	α (91%)	^{247}Fm	(7/2+)
^{251}No	102	149	251.088945(4)	1967	0.80(1) s	β^{+} (9%)	^{251}Md	(7/2+)
^{251}No	102	149	251.088945(4)	1967	0.80(1) s	SF (0.14%)	(various)	(7/2+)
^{251m1}No	105(3) keV			2004	1.02(3) s	α	^{247m}Fm	(1/2+)
^{251m2}No	1128.0(10) keV			2006	>1.7 μs	IT	^{251}No	17/2−#
^{252}No	102	150	252.088966(10)	1967	2.467(16) s	α (70%)	^{248}Fm	0+
^{252}No	102	150	252.088966(10)	1967	2.467(16) s	SF (29%)	(various)	0+
^{252}No	102	150	252.088966(10)	1967	2.467(16) s	β^{+} (0.8%)	^{252}Md	0+
^{252m1}No	<300 keV			2026	9+13 −4 μs	α	^{248}Fm	
^{252m2}No	1254 keV			2007	100(3) ms	IT	^{252}No	(8−)
^{252m3}No				(2007) (Note: Only published in a thesis and not a refereed journal)	921(118) μs	IT	^{252}No	
^{253}No	102	151	253.090563(7)	1967	1.57(2) min	α (55%)	^{249}Fm	9/2−
^{253}No	102	151	253.090563(7)	1967	1.57(2) min	β^{+} (45%)	^{253}Md	9/2−
^{253m1}No	167.5(5) keV			1973	30.3(16) μs	α	^{249}Fm	5/2+
^{253m2}No	1196(107) keV			2011	706(24) μs	IT	^{253}No	19/2+#
^{253m3}No	1256(113) keV			2011	552(15) μs	IT	^{253}No	25/2+#
^{254}No	102	152	254.090954(10)	1966	51.2(4) s	α (90%)	^{250}Fm	0+
^{254}No	102	152	254.090954(10)	1966	51.2(4) s	β^{+} (10%)	^{254}Md	0+
^{254}No	102	152	254.090954(10)	1966	51.2(4) s	SF (0.17%)	(various)	0+
^{254m1}No	1296.4(11) keV			1971	264.9(14) ms	IT (98%)	^{254}No	(8−)
^{254m1}No	1296.4(11) keV			1971	264.9(14) ms	SF (0.02%)	(various)	(8−)
^{254m2}No	3217(300)# keV			2006	184(3) μs	IT	^{254m1}No	16+#
^{255}No	102	153	255.093196(15)	1967	3.52(18) min	β^{+} (70%)	^{255}Md	(1/2+)
^{255}No	102	153	255.093196(15)	1967	3.52(18) min	α (30%)	^{251}Fm	(1/2+)
^{255m1}No	240–300 keV			2010	109(9) μs	IT	^{255}No	(11/2−)
^{255m2}No	1400–1600 keV			2022	77(6) μs	IT	^{255m1}No	(19/2,21/2,23/2)
^{255m3}No	≥1500 keV			2022	1.2+0.6 −0.4 μs	IT	^{255m1}No	(≥19/2)
^{255m4}No	≥2500 keV			2024	5±1 μs	IT	^{255m3}No	
^{256}No	102	154	256.094282(8)	1963	2.91(5) s	α (99.45%)	^{252}Fm	0+
^{256}No	102	154	256.094282(8)	1963	2.91(5) s	SF (0.55%)	(various)	0+
^{256m}No				2021	7.8+8.3 −2.6 μs	IT	^{256}No	(5−,7−)
^{257}No	102	155	257.096884(7)	1967	24.5(5) s	α (85%)	^{253}Fm	(3/2+)
^{257}No	102	155	257.096884(7)	1967	24.5(5) s	β^{+} (15%)	^{257}Md	(3/2+)
^{258}No	102	156	258.09821(11)#	1989	1.23(12) ms	SF	(various)	0+
^{259}No	102	157	259.100998(7)	1973	58(5) min	α (75%)	^{255}Fm	9/2+
^{259}No	102	157	259.100998(7)	1973	58(5) min	EC (25%)	^{259}Md	9/2+
^{259}No	102	157	259.100998(7)	1973	58(5) min	SF (<10%)	(various)	9/2+
^{260}No	102	158	260.10264(22)#	1985	106(8) ms	SF	(various)	0+
^{262}No (Note: Not directly synthesized, occurs as decay product of ^{262}Lr)	102	160	262.10746(39)#	(1988)	~5 ms	SF	(various)	0+
This table header & footer:

== Nucleosynthesis ==
=== Cold fusion ===
^{208}Pb(^{48}Ca,xn)^{256−x}No (x=1,2,3,4)

This cold fusion reaction was first studied in 1979 at Flerov Laboratory of Nuclear Reactions (FLNR). Further work in 1988 at GSI measured EC and SF branchings in ^{254}No. In 1989, the FLNR used the reaction to measure SF decay characteristics for the two isomers of ^{254}No. The measurement of the 2n excitation function was reported in 2001 by Yuri Oganessian at the FLNR.

Patin et al. at the LBNL reported in 2002 the synthesis of ^{255–251}No in the 1-4n exit channels and measured further decay data for these isotopes.

The reaction has recently been used at Jyväskylän Yliopisto Fysiikan Laitos (JYFL) using the RITU set-up to study K-isomerism in ^{254}No. The scientists were able to measure two K-isomers with half-lives of 275 ms and 198 s, respectively. They were assigned to 8^{−} and 16^{+} K-isomeric levels.

The reaction was used in 2004–5 at the FLNR to study the spectroscopy of ^{255–253}No. The team were able to confirm an isomeric level in ^{253}No with a half-life of 43.5 s.

^{208}Pb(^{44}Ca,xn)^{252−x}No (x=2)

This reaction was studied in 2003 at the FLNR in a study of the spectroscopy of ^{250}No.

^{207}Pb(^{48}Ca,xn)^{255−x}No (x=2)

The measurement of the 2n excitation function for this reaction was reported in 2001 by Yuri Oganessian and co-workers at the FLNR. The reaction was used in 2004–5 to study the spectroscopy of ^{253}No.

^{206}Pb(^{48}Ca,xn)^{254−x}No (x=1,2,3,4)

The measurement of the 1-4n excitation functions for this reaction were reported in 2001 by Yuri Oganessian and co-workers at the FLNR. The 2n channel was further studied by the GSI to provide a spectroscopic determination of K-isomerism in ^{252}No. A K-isomer with spin and parity 8^{−} was detected with a half-life of 110 ms.

^{204}Pb(^{48}Ca,xn)^{252−x}No (x=2,3)

The measurement of the 2n excitation function for this reaction was reported in 2001 by Yuri Oganessian at the FLNR. They reported a new isotope ^{250}No with a half-life of 36 μs. The reaction was used in 2003 to study the spectroscopy of ^{250}No.They were able to observe two spontaneous fission activities with half-lives of 5.6 μs and 54 μs and assigned to ^{250}No and ^{249}No, respectively. The latter activity was later assigned to a K-isomer in ^{250}No. The reaction was reported in 2006 by Peterson et al. at the Argonne National Laboratory (ANL) in a study of SF in ^{250}No. They detected two activities with half-lives of 3.7 μs and 43 μs and both assigned to ^{250}No, the latter associated with a K-isomer. In 2020, a team at FLNR repeated this reaction and found a new 9.1-MeV alpha particle activity correlated to ^{245}Fm and ^{241}Cf, which they assigned to the new isotope ^{249}No.

=== Hot fusion ===
^{232}Th(^{26}Mg,xn)^{258−x}No (x=4,5,6)

The cross sections for the 4-6n exit channels have been measured for this reaction at the FLNR.

^{238}U(^{22}Ne,xn)^{260−x}No (x=4,5,6)

This reaction was first studied in 1964 at FLNR. The team were able to detect decays from ^{252}Fm and ^{250}Fm. The ^{252}Fm activity was associated with an ~8 s half-life and assigned to ^{256}102 from the 4n channel, with a yield of 45 nb. They were also able to detect a 10 s spontaneous fission activity also tentatively assigned to ^{256}102. Further work in 1966 on the reaction examined the detection of ^{250}Fm decay using chemical separation and a parent activity with a half-life of ~50 s was reported and correctly assigned to ^{254}102. They also detected a 10 s spontaneous fission activity tentatively assigned to ^{256}102. The reaction was used in 1969 to study some initial chemistry of nobelium at the FLNR. They determined eka-ytterbium properties, consistent with nobelium as the heavier homologue. In 1970, they were able to study the SF properties of ^{256}No. In 2002, Patin et al. reported the synthesis of ^{256}No from the 4n channel but were unable to detect ^{257}No.

The cross section values for the 4-6n channels have also been studied at the FLNR.

^{238}U(^{20}Ne,xn)^{258−x}No

This reaction was studied in 1964 at FLNR. No spontaneous fission activities were observed.

^{236}U(^{22}Ne,xn)^{258−x}No (x=4,5,6)

The cross sections for the 4-6n exit channels have been measured for this reaction at the FLNR.

^{235}U(^{22}Ne,xn)^{257−x}No (x=5)

This reaction was studied in 1970 at the FLNR. It was used to study the SF decay properties of ^{252}No.

^{233}U(^{22}Ne,xn)^{255−x}No

The synthesis of neutron deficient nobelium isotopes was studied in 1975 at the FLNR. In their experiments they observed a 250 s SF activity, which they tentatively assigned to ^{250}No in the 5n exit channel. Later results have not been able to confirm this activity and it is currently unidentified.

^{242}Pu(^{18}O,xn)^{260−x}No (x=4?)

This reaction was studied in 1966 at the FLNR. The team identified an 8.2 s SF activity tentatively assigned to ^{256}102.

^{241}Pu(^{16}O,xn)^{257−x}No

This reaction was first studied in 1958 at the FLNR. The team measured ~8.8 MeV alpha particles with a half-life of 30 s and assigned to ^{253,252,251}102. A repeat in 1960 produced 8.9 MeV alpha particles with a half-life of 2–40 s and assigned to ^{253}102 from the 4n channel. Confidence in these results was later diminished.

^{239}Pu(^{18}O,xn)^{257−x}No (x=5)

This reaction was studied in 1970 at the FLNR in an effort to study the SF decay properties of ^{252}No.

^{239}Pu(^{16}O,xn)^{255−x}No

This reaction was first studied in 1958 at the FLNR. The team were able to measure ~8.8 MeV alpha particles with a half-life of 30 s and assigned to^{253,252,251}102. A repeat in 1960 was unsuccessful and it was concluded the first results were probably associated with background effects.

^{243}Am(^{15}N,xn)^{258−x}No (x=4)

This reaction was studied in 1966 at the FLNR. The team were able to detect ^{250}Fm using chemical techniques and determined an associated half-life significantly higher than the reported 3 s by Berkeley for the supposed parent ^{254}No. Further work later the same year measured 8.1 MeV alpha particles with a half-life of 30–40 s.

^{243}Am(^{14}N,xn)^{257−x}No

This reaction was studied in 1966 at the FLNR. They were unable to detect the 8.1 MeV alpha particles detected when using a N-15 beam.

^{241}Am(^{15}N,xn)^{256−x}No (x=4)

The decay properties of ^{252}No were examined in 1977 at Oak Ridge. The team calculated a half-life of 2.3 s and measured a 27% SF branching.

^{248}Cm(^{18}O,αxn)^{262−x}No (x=3)

The synthesis of the new isotope ^{259}No was reported in 1973 from the LBNL using this reaction.

^{248}Cm(^{13}C,xn)^{261−x}No (x=3?,4,5)

This reaction was first studied in 1967 at the LBNL. The new isotopes ^{258}No,^{257}No and ^{256}No were detected in the 3-5n channels. The reaction was repeated in 1970 to provide further decay data for ^{257}No.

^{248}Cm(^{12}C,xn)^{260−x}No (4,5?)

This reaction was studied in 1967 at the LBNL in their seminal study of nobelium isotopes. The reaction was used in 1990 at the LBNL to study the SF of^{256}No.

^{246}Cm(^{13}C,xn)^{259−x}No (4?,5?)

This reaction was studied in 1967 at the LBNL in their seminal study of nobelium isotopes.

^{246}Cm(^{12}C,xn)^{258−x}No (4,5)

This reaction was studied in 1958 by scientists at the LBNL using a 5% ^{246}Cm curium target. They were able to measure 7.43 MeV decays from^{250}Fm, associated with a 3 s ^{254}No parent activity, resulting from the 4n channel. The 3 s activity was later reassigned to ^{252}No, resulting from reaction with the predominant ^{244}Cm component in the target. It could however not be proved that it was not due to the contaminant^{250m}Fm, unknown at the time. Later work in 1959 produced 8.3 MeV alpha particles with a half-life of 3 s and a 30% SF branch. This was initially assigned to ^{254}No and later reassigned to ^{252}No, resulting from reaction with the ^{244}Cm component in the target. The reaction was restudied in 1967 and activities assigned to ^{254}No and ^{253}No were detected.

^{244}Cm(^{13}C,xn)^{257−x}No (x=4)

This reaction was first studied in 1957 at the Nobel Institute in Stockholm. The scientists detected 8.5 MeV alpha particles with a half-life of 10 minutes. The activity was assigned to ^{251}No or ^{253}No. The results were later dismissed as background. The reaction was repeated by scientists at the LBNL in 1958 but they were unable to confirm the 8.5 MeV alpha particles. The reaction was further studied in 1967 at the LBNL and an activity assigned to ^{253}No was measured.

^{244}Cm(^{12}C,xn)^{256−x}No (x=4,5)

This reaction was studied in 1958 by scientists at the LBNL using a 95% ^{244}Cm curium target. They were able to measure 7.43 MeV decays from^{250}Fm, associated with a 3 s ^{254}No parent activity, resulting from the reaction (^{246}Cm,4n). The 3 s activity was later reassigned to^{252}No, resulting from reaction (^{244}Cm,4n). It could however not be proved that it was not due to the contaminant ^{250m}Fm, unknown at the time. Later work in 1959 produced 8.3 MeV alpha particles with a half-life of 3 s and a 30% SF branch. This was initially assigned to ^{254}No and later reassigned to ^{252}No, resulting from reaction with the ^{244}Cm component in the target. The reaction was restudied in 1967 at the LBNL and a new activity assigned to ^{251}No was measured.

^{252}Cf(^{12}C,αxn)^{260−x}No (x=3?)

This reaction was studied at the LBNL in 1961 as part of their search for element 104. They detected 8.2 MeV alpha particles with a half-life of 15 s. This activity was assigned to a Z=102 isotope. Later work suggests an assignment to ^{257}No, resulting most likely from the α3n channel with the ^{252}Cf component of the californium target.

^{252}Cf(^{11}B,pxn)^{262−x}No (x=5?)

This reaction was studied at the LBNL in 1961 as part of their search for element 103. They detected 8.2 MeV alpha particles with a half-life of 15 s. This activity was assigned to a Z=102 isotope. Later work suggests an assignment to ^{257}No, resulting most likely from the p5n channel with the ^{252}Cf component of the californium target.

^{249}Cf(^{12}C,αxn)^{257−x}No (x=2)

This reaction was first studied in 1970 at the LBNL in a study of ^{255}No. It was studied in 1971 at the Oak Ridge Laboratory. They were able to measure coincident Z=100 K X-rays from ^{255}No, confirming the discovery of the element.

=== As decay products ===
Isotopes of nobelium have also been identified in the decay of heavier elements. Observations to date are summarised in the table below:

Evaporation Residue	Observed No isotope
^{262}Lr	^{262}No
^{269}Hs, ^{265}Sg, ^{261}Rf	^{257}No
^{267}Hs, ^{263}Sg, ^{259}Rf	^{255}No
^{254}Lr	^{254}No
^{261}Sg, ^{257}Rf	^{253}No
^{264}Hs, ^{260}Sg, ^{256}Rf	^{252}No
^{255}Rf	^{251}No

== Isotopes ==
Twelve radioisotopes of nobelium have been characterized, with the most stable being ^{259}No with a half-life of 58 minutes. Longer half-lives are expected for the as-yet-unknown ^{261}No and ^{263}No. An isomeric level has been found in ^{253}No and K-isomers have been found in ^{250}No, ^{252}No and ^{254}No to date.

=== Nuclear isomerism ===
^{254}No

The study of K-isomerism was recently studied by physicists at the University of Jyväskylä physics laboratory (JYFL). They were able to confirm a previously reported K-isomer and detected a second K-isomer. They assigned spins and parities of 8^{−} and 16^{+} to the two K-isomers.

^{253}No

In 1971, Bemis et al. was able to determine an isomeric level decaying with a half-life of 31 s from the decay of ^{257}Rf. This was confirmed in 2003 at the GSI by also studying the decay of ^{257}Rf. Further support in the same year from the FLNR appeared with a slightly higher half-life of 43.5 s, decaying by M2 gamma emission to the ground state.

^{252}No

In a recent study by the GSI into K-isomerism in even-even isotopes, a K-isomer with a half-life of 110 ms was detected for ^{252}No. A spin and parity of 8^{−} was assigned to the isomer.

^{250}No

In 2003, scientists at the FLNR reported that they had been able to synthesise ^{249}No, which decayed by SF with a half-life of 54 μs. Further work in 2006 by scientists at the ANL showed that the activity was actually due to a K-isomer in ^{250}No. The ground state isomer was also detected with a very short half-life of 3.7 μs.

=== Chemical yields of isotopes ===
==== Cold fusion ====
The table below provides cross-sections and excitation energies for cold fusion reactions producing nobelium isotopes directly. Data in bold represents maxima derived from excitation function measurements. + represents an observed exit channel.

Projectile	Target	CN	1n	2n	3n	4n
^{48}Ca	^{208}Pb	^{256}No		^{254}No: **2050 nb ; 22.3 MeV**		
^{48}Ca	^{207}Pb	^{255}No		^{253}No: **1310 nb ; 22.4 MeV**		
^{48}Ca	^{206}Pb	^{254}No	^{253}No: 58 nb ; 23.6 MeV	^{252}No: **515 nb ; 23.3 MeV**	^{251}No: **30 nb ; 30.7 MeV**	^{250}No: 260 pb ; 43.9 MeV
^{48}Ca	^{204}Pb	^{252}No		^{250}No:**13.2 nb ; 23.2 MeV**		

==== Hot fusion ====
The table below provides cross-sections and excitation energies for hot fusion reactions producing nobelium isotopes directly. Data in bold represents maxima derived from excitation function measurements. + represents an observed exit channel.

Projectile	Target	CN	3n	4n	5n	6n
^{26}Mg	^{232}Th	^{258}No		^{254}No:1.6 nb	^{253}No:9 nb	^{252}No:8 nb
^{22}Ne	^{238}U	^{260}No		^{256}No:40 nb	^{255}No:200 nb	^{254}No:15 nb
^{22}Ne	^{236}U	^{258}No		^{254}No:7 nb	^{253}No:25 nb	^{252}No:15 nb

=== Retracted isotopes ===
In 2003, scientists at the FLNR claimed to have discovered ^{249}No, which would have been the lightest known isotope of nobelium. However, subsequent work showed that the 54 μs fission activity instead originated from an excited state of ^{250}No. The discovery of this isotope was later reported in 2020; its decay properties differed from the 2003 claims.
