= Isotopes of lawrencium =

Isotopes of lawrencium (_{103}Lr)
Main isotopes			Decay	
Isotope	abundance	half-life (t_{1/2})	mode	product
^{255}Lr	synth	31 s	α	^{251}Md
^{255}Lr	synth	31 s	β^{+}	^{255}No
^{256}Lr	synth	28 s	α	^{252}Md
^{256}Lr	synth	28 s	β^{+}	^{256}No
^{260}Lr	synth	3.0 min	α	^{256}Md
^{260}Lr	synth	3.0 min	β^{+}	^{260}No
^{261}Lr	synth	39 min	SF	–
^{262}Lr	synth	4 h	β^{+}	^{262}No
^{262}Lr	synth	4 h	SF	–
^{264}Lr	synth	4.8 h	SF	–
^{266}Lr	synth	11 h	SF	–

Lawrencium (_{103}Lr) is a synthetic element, and thus a standard atomic weight cannot be given. Like all synthetic elements, it has no stable isotopes. The first isotope to be synthesized was ^{258}Lr in 1961. There are fourteen known isotopes from ^{251}Lr to ^{266}Lr, except ^{263}Lr and ^{265}Lr, and seven isomers. The longest-lived known isotope is ^{266}Lr with a half-life of 11 hours.

== List of isotopes ==
Nuclide (Note: ^{m}Lr – Excited nuclear isomer.)	Z	N	Isotopic mass (Da) (Note: ( ) – Uncertainty (1σ) is given in concise form in parentheses after the corresponding last digits.) (Note: # – Atomic mass marked #: value and uncertainty derived not from purely experimental data, but at least partly from trends from the Mass Surface (TMS).)	Discovery year	Half-life	Decay mode (Note: Modes of decay: SF: / Spontaneous fission)	Daughter isotope	Spin and parity (Note: ( ) spin value – Indicates spin with weak assignment arguments.) (Note: # – Values marked # are not purely derived from experimental data, but at least partly from trends of neighboring nuclides (TNN).)
Nuclide	Excitation energy			Discovery year	Half-life	Decay mode	Daughter isotope	Spin and parity
^{251}Lr	103	148	251.09429(22)#	2022	24.4+7.0 −4.5 ms	α	^{247}Md	7/2−
^{251}Lr	103	148	251.09429(22)#	2022	24.4+7.0 −4.5 ms	SF (Note: The experiment in which alpha decay of two ^{251}Lr states was reported did not take into account spontaneous fission branches.)	(various)	7/2−
^{251m}Lr	117(27) keV			2022	42+42 −14 ms	α	^{247}Md	1/2−
^{252}Lr (Note: Not directly synthesized, occurs as a decay product of ^{256}Db)	103	149	252.09505(20)#	2001	369(75) ms	α (~98%)	^{248}Md	7−#
^{252}Lr	103	149	252.09505(20)#	2001	369(75) ms	SF (~2%)	(various)	7−#
^{253}Lr	103	150	253.09503(18)	1985	632(46) ms	α (99%)	^{249}Md	(7/2−)
^{253}Lr	103	150	253.09503(18)	1985	632(46) ms	SF (1.0%)	(various)	(7/2−)
^{253m}Lr (Note: Order of ground state and isomer is uncertain.)	30(100)# keV			2001	1.32(14) s	α (88%)	^{249}Md	(1/2−)
^{253m}Lr	30(100)# keV			2001	1.32(14) s	SF (12%)	(various)	(1/2−)
^{254}Lr	103	151	254.09624(10)	1981	12.0(9) s	α (71.7%)	^{250}Md	4+#
^{254}Lr	103	151	254.09624(10)	1981	12.0(9) s	β^{+} (28.3%)	^{254}No	4+#
^{254}Lr	103	151	254.09624(10)	1981	12.0(9) s	SF (<0.1%)	(various)	4+#
^{254m}Lr	110(6) keV			2019	20.3(4.1) s	α	^{250}Md	1+#
^{255}Lr	103	152	255.096562(19)	1970	31.1(11) s	α (85%)	^{251}Md	1/2−
^{255}Lr	103	152	255.096562(19)	1970	31.1(11) s	β^{+} (15%)	^{255}No	1/2−
^{255m1}Lr	32(2) keV			2006	2.54(5) s	IT (~60%)	^{255}Lr	(7/2−)
^{255m1}Lr	32(2) keV			2006	2.54(5) s	α (~40%)	^{251}Md	(7/2−)
^{255m2}Lr	796(12) keV			(2009) (Note: Only an upper limit of the half-life was reported, not included in discovery database)	<1 μs	IT	^{255m1}Lr	(15/2+)
^{255m3}Lr	1465(12) keV			2008	1.78(5) ms	IT	^{255m2}Lr	(25/2+)
^{256}Lr	103	153	256.09849(9)	1965	27.9(10) s	α (85%)	^{252}Md	(0−,3−)#
^{256}Lr	103	153	256.09849(9)	1965	27.9(10) s	β^{+} (15%)	^{256}No	(0−,3−)#
^{256}Lr	103	153	256.09849(9)	1965	27.9(10) s	SF (<0.03%)	(various)	(0−,3−)#
^{257}Lr	103	154	257.09948(5)#	1971	6.0(4) s	α	^{253}Md	7/2−#
^{257m}Lr	100(50)# keV			2016	203+164 −63 ms [0.27(12) s]	α?	^{253}Md	(1/2−)
^{257m}Lr	100(50)# keV			2016	203+164 −63 ms [0.27(12) s]	IT?	^{257}Lr	(1/2−)
^{258}Lr	103	155	258.10175(11)#	1971	3.92(33) s	α (97.4%)	^{254}Md	
^{258}Lr	103	155	258.10175(11)#	1971	3.92(33) s	β^{+} (2.6%)	^{258}No	
^{259}Lr	103	156	259.10290(8)#	1971	6.2(3) s	α (78%)	^{255}Md	1/2−#
^{259}Lr	103	156	259.10290(8)#	1971	6.2(3) s	SF (22%)	(various)	1/2−#
^{260}Lr	103	157	260.10550(13)#	1971	3.0(5) min	α (80%)	^{256}Md	
^{260}Lr	103	157	260.10550(13)#	1971	3.0(5) min	β^{+} (20%)	^{260}No	
^{261}Lr	103	158	261.10688(22)#	(1987)	39(12) min	SF	(various)	1/2−#
^{262}Lr	103	159	262.10962(22)#	(1987)	~4 h	β^{+}	^{262}No	
^{262}Lr	103	159	262.10962(22)#	(1987)	~4 h	SF	(various)	
^{264}Lr (Note: Not directly synthesized, occurs as a decay product of ^{288}Mc)	103	161	264.11420(47)#	2022	4.8+2.2 −1.3 h	SF	(various)	
^{266}Lr (Note: Not directly synthesized, occurs as a decay product of ^{294}Ts)	103	163	266.11987(58)#	2014	11+21 −5 h [22(14) h]	SF	(various)	
This table header & footer:

== Nucleosynthesis ==
=== Cold fusion ===
^{205}Tl(^{50}Ti,xn)^{255−x}Lr (x=2)

This reaction was studied in a series of experiments in 1976 by Yuri Oganessian and his team at the FLNR. Evidence was provided for the formation of ^{253}Lr in the 2n exit channel. In 2022, two states (^{253}Lr and ^{253m}Lr) were found.

^{203}Tl(^{50}Ti,xn)^{253−x}Lr (x=2)

This reaction was studied in a series of experiments in 1976 by Yuri Oganessian and his team at the FLNR. In 2022, two states (^{251}Lr and ^{251m}Lr) were found.

^{208}Pb(^{48}Ti,pxn)^{255−x}Lr (x=1?)

This reaction was reported in 1984 by Yuri Oganessian at the FLNR. The team was able to detect decays of ^{246}Cf, a descendant of ^{254}Lr.

^{208}Pb(^{45}Sc,xn)^{253−x}Lr

This reaction was studied in a series of experiments in 1976 by Yuri Oganessian and his team at the FLNR. Results are not readily available.

^{209}Bi(^{48}Ca,xn)^{257−x}Lr (x=2)

This reaction has been used to study the spectroscopic properties of ^{255}Lr. The team at GANIL used the reaction in 2003 and the team at the FLNR used it between 2004–2006 to provide further information for the decay scheme of ^{255}Lr. The work provided evidence for an isomeric level in ^{255}Lr.

=== Hot fusion ===
^{243}Am(^{18}O,xn)^{261−x}Lr (x=5)

This reaction was first studied in 1965 by the team at the FLNR. They were able to detect activity with a characteristic decay of 45 seconds, which was assigned to^{256}Lr or ^{257}Lr. Later work suggests an assignment to ^{256}Lr. Further studies in 1968 produced an 8.35–8.60 MeV alpha activity with a half-life of 35 seconds. This activity was also initially assigned to ^{256}Lr or ^{257}Lr and later to solely ^{256}Lr.

^{243}Am(^{16}O,xn)^{259−x}Lr (x=4)

This reaction was studied in 1970 by the team at the FLNR. They were able to detect an 8.38 MeV alpha activity with a half-life of 20 s. This was assigned to ^{255}Lr.

^{248}Cm(^{15}N,xn)^{263−x}Lr (x=3,4,5)

This reaction was studied in 1971 by the team at the LBNL in their large study of lawrencium isotopes. They were able to assign alpha activities to ^{260}Lr, ^{259}Lr and ^{258}Lr from the 3-5n exit channels.

^{248}Cm(^{18}O,pxn)^{265−x}Lr (x=3,4)

This reaction was studied in 1988 at the LBNL in order to examine the possibility of producing ^{262}Lr and ^{261}Lr without using the exotic ^{254}Es target, and successfully accomplished this. After chemical purification of the Lr from the reaction, they were able to measure fission from ^{261}Lr with an improved half-life of 44 minutes. The production cross-section was 700 pb; from this a 14% electron capture branch of ^{261m}Rf was calculated if this isotope had been produced via the 5n channel rather than the p4n channel. This is an upper limit, as it was determined that the p4n channel does occur. A lower bombarding energy (93 MeV instead of 97 MeV) was then used to measure the production of ^{262}Lr in the p3n channel; as it was calculated that any electron capture of ^{262}Rf should be negligible, the 4n channel was discounted. The isotope was successfully detected and a 240 pb cross-section measured. This detection of the p3n channel supported the p4n assignment for the lighter isotope. For neither was there any attempt to differentiate the SF and EC+SF decay modes.

^{246}Cm(^{14}N,xn)^{260−x}Lr (x=3?)

This reaction was studied briefly in 1958 at the LBNL using an enriched ^{244}Cm target (5% ^{246}Cm). They observed a ~9 MeV alpha activity with a half-life of ~0.25 seconds. Later results suggest a tentative assignment to ^{257}Lr from the 3n channel.

^{244}Cm(^{14}N,xn)^{258−x}Lr

This reaction was studied briefly in 1958 at the LBNL using an enriched ^{244}Cm target (5% ^{246}Cm). They observed a ~9 MeV alpha activity with a half-life of ~0.25s. Later results suggest a tentative assignment to ^{257}Lr from the 3n channel with the ^{246}Cm component. No activities assigned to reaction with the ^{244}Cm component have been reported.

^{249}Bk(^{18}O,αxn)^{263−x}Lr (x=3)

This reaction was studied in 1971 by the team at the LBNL in their large study of lawrencium isotopes. They were able to detect an activity assigned to ^{260}Lr. The reaction was further studied in 1988 to study the aqueous chemistry of lawrencium. A total of 23 alpha decays were measured for ^{260}Lr, with a mean energy of 8.03 MeV and an improved half-life of 2.7 minutes. The calculated cross-section was 8.7 nb.

^{252}Cf(^{11}B,xn)^{263−x}Lr (x=5,7??)

This reaction was first studied in 1961 at the University of California by Albert Ghiorso by using a californium target (52% ^{252}Cf). They observed three alpha activities of 8.6, 8.4 and 8.2 MeV, with half-lives of about 8 and 15 seconds, respectively. The 8.6 MeV activity was tentatively assigned to ^{257}Lr. Later results suggest a reassignment to ^{258}Lr, resulting from the 5n exit channel. The 8.4 MeV activity was also assigned to ^{257}Lr. Later results suggest a reassignment to ^{256}Lr. This is most likely from the 33% ^{250}Cf component in the target rather than from the 7n channel. The 8.2 MeV was subsequently associated with nobelium.

^{252}Cf(^{10}B,xn)^{262−x}Lr (x=4,6)

This reaction was first studied in 1961 at the University of California by Albert Ghiorso by using a californium target (52% ^{252}Cf). They observed three alpha activities of 8.6, 8.4 and 8.2 MeV, with half-lives of about 8 and 15 seconds, respectively. The 8.6 MeV activity was tentatively assigned to ^{257}Lr. Later results suggest a reassignment to ^{258}Lr. The 8.4 MeV activity was also assigned to ^{257}Lr. Later results suggest a reassignment to ^{256}Lr. The 8.2 MeV was subsequently associated with nobelium.

^{250}Cf(^{14}N,αxn)^{260−x}Lr (x=3)

This reaction was studied in 1971 at the LBNL. They were able to identify a 0.7s alpha activity with two alpha lines at 8.87 and 8.82 MeV. This was assigned to ^{257}Lr.

^{249}Cf(^{11}B,xn)^{260−x}Lr (x=4)

This reaction was first studied in 1970 at the LBNL in an attempt to study the aqueous chemistry of lawrencium. They were able to measure a Lr^{3+} activity. The reaction was repeated in 1976 at Oak Ridge and 26s ^{256}Lr was confirmed by measurement of coincident X-rays.

^{249}Cf(^{12}C,pxn)^{260−x}Lr (x=2)

This reaction was studied in 1971 by the team at the LBNL. They were able to detect an activity assigned to ^{258}Lr from the p2n channel.

^{249}Cf(^{15}N,αxn)^{260−x}Lr (x=2,3)

This reaction was studied in 1971 by the team at the LBNL. They were able to detect an activities assigned to ^{258}Lr and ^{257}Lr from the α2n and α3n and channels. The reaction was repeated in 1976 at Oak Ridge and the synthesis of ^{258}Lr was confirmed.

^{254}Es + ^{22}Ne – transfer

This reaction was studied in 1987 at the LLNL. They were able to detect new spontaneous fission (SF) activities assigned to ^{261}Lr and ^{262}Lr, resulting from transfer from the ^{22}Ne nuclei to the ^{254}Es target. In addition, a 5 ms SF activity was detected in delayed coincidence with nobelium K-shell X-rays and was assigned to ^{262}No, resulting from the electron capture of ^{262}Lr.

=== Decay products ===
Isotopes of lawrencium have also been identified in the decay of heavier elements. Observations to date are summarised in the table below:

List of lawrencium isotopes produced as other nuclei decay products
Parent nuclide	Observed lawrencium isotope
^{294}Ts, ^{290}Mc, ^{286}Nh, ^{282}Rg, ^{278}Mt, ^{274}Bh, ^{270}Db	^{266}Lr
^{288}Mc, ^{284}Nh, ^{280}Rg, ^{276}Mt, ^{272}Bh, ^{268}Db	^{264}Lr
^{267}Bh, ^{263}Db	^{259}Lr
^{278}Nh, ^{274}Rg, ^{270}Mt, ^{266}Bh, ^{262}Db	^{258}Lr
^{261}Db	^{257}Lr
^{272}Rg, ^{268}Mt, ^{264}Bh, ^{260}Db	^{256}Lr
^{259}Db	^{255}Lr
^{266}Mt, ^{262}Bh, ^{258}Db	^{254}Lr
^{261}Bh, ^{257}Db^{g,m}	^{253}Lr^{g,m}
^{260}Bh, ^{256}Db	^{252}Lr
^{255}Db	^{251}Lr

== Isotopes ==
Fourteen isotopes of lawrencium plus seven isomers have been synthesized with ^{266}Lr being the longest-lived and the heaviest, with a half-life of 11 hours. ^{251}Lr is the lightest isotope of lawrencium to be produced to date.

=== Lawrencium-253 isomers ===
A study of the decay properties of ^{257}Db (see dubnium) in 2001 by Hessberger et al. at the GSI provided some data for the decay of ^{253}Lr. Analysis of the data indicated the population of an isomeric level in ^{253}Lr from the decay of the corresponding isomer in ^{257}Db. The ground state was assigned spin and parity of 7/2−, decaying by emission of an 8794 keV alpha particle with a half-life of 0.57 s. The isomeric level was assigned spin and parity of 1/2−, decaying by emission of an 8722 keV alpha particle with a half-life of 1.49 s.

=== Lawrencium-255 isomers ===
Recent work on the spectroscopy of ^{255}Lr formed in the reaction ^{209}Bi(^{48}Ca,2n)^{255}Lr has provided evidence for an isomeric level.
