= Isotopes of mendelevium =

Isotopes of mendelevium (_{101}Md)
Main isotopes			Decay	
Isotope	abundance	half-life (t_{1/2})	mode	product
^{256}Md	synth	77.7 min	ε	^{256}Fm
^{256}Md	synth	77.7 min	α	^{252}Es
^{257}Md	synth	5.52 h	ε	^{257}Fm
^{257}Md	synth	5.52 h	α	^{253}Es
^{258}Md	synth	51.6 d	α	^{254}Es
^{259}Md	synth	1.60 h	SF	–
^{260}Md	synth	27.8 d	SF	–

Mendelevium (_{101}Md) is a synthetic element, and thus a standard atomic weight cannot be given. Like all artificial elements, it has no stable isotopes. The first isotope to be synthesized was ^{256}Md (which was also the first isotope of any element produced one atom at a time) in 1955. There are 17 known radioisotopes, ranging in atomic mass from ^{244}Md to ^{260}Md, and 10 isomers. The longest-lived isotope is ^{258}Md with a half-life of 51.6 days, and the longest-lived isomer is ^{258m}Md with a half-life of 57 minutes.

== List of isotopes ==
Nuclide (Note: ^{m}Md – Excited nuclear isomer.)	Z	N	Isotopic mass (Da) (Note: ( ) – Uncertainty (1σ) is given in concise form in parentheses after the corresponding last digits.) (Note: # – Atomic mass marked #: value and uncertainty derived not from purely experimental data, but at least partly from trends from the Mass Surface (TMS).)	Discovery year	Half-life	Decay mode (Note: Modes of decay: EC: / Electron capture; SF: / Spontaneous fission)	Daughter isotope	Spin and parity (Note: ( ) spin value – Indicates spin with weak assignment arguments.) (Note: # – Values marked # are not purely derived from experimental data, but at least partly from trends of neighboring nuclides (TNN).)
Nuclide	Excitation energy			Discovery year	Half-life	Decay mode	Daughter isotope	Spin and parity
^{244}Md (Note: Discovery of this isotope is disputed due to conflicting data.)	101	143	244.08116(40)#	2020	0.30+0.19 −0.09 s [0.36(14) s]	α	^{240}Es	3+#
^{244}Md	101	143	244.08116(40)#	2020	0.30+0.19 −0.09 s [0.36(14) s]	β^{+}, SF (<14%)	(various)	3+#
^{244m}Md	200(150)# keV			(2020) (Note: Half-life only estimated, not included in discovery database)	~9 μs	IT	^{244}Md	7+#
^{245}Md	101	144	245.08086(28)#	1996	0.38(10) s	α	^{241}Es	(7/2−)
^{245m}Md (Note: Order of ground state and isomer is uncertain.)	100(100)# keV			1996	0.90(25) ms	SF	(various)	1/2−#
^{246}Md	101	145	246.08171(28)#	1996	0.92(18) s	α	^{242}Es	1−#
^{246m}Md	60(60) keV			2010	4.4(8) s	β^{+} (~67%)	^{246}Fm	4−#
^{246m}Md	60(60) keV			2010	4.4(8) s	α (<23%)	^{242}Es	4−#
^{246m}Md	60(60) keV			2010	4.4(8) s	β^{+}, SF (>10%)	(various)	4−#
^{247}Md	101	146	247.08152(22)#	1981	1.20(12) s	α (99.14%)	^{243}Es	(7/2−)
^{247}Md	101	146	247.08152(22)#	1981	1.20(12) s	SF (0.86%)	(various)	(7/2−)
^{247m}Md	153 keV			2010	0.23(3) s	α (80%)	^{243}Es	(1/2−)
^{247m}Md	153 keV			2010	0.23(3) s	SF (20%)	(various)	(1/2−)
^{248}Md	101	147	248.08261(20)#	1973	7(3) s	β^{+} (80%)	^{248}Fm	
^{248}Md	101	147	248.08261(20)#	1973	7(3) s	α (20%)	^{244}Es	
^{248}Md	101	147	248.08261(20)#	1973	7(3) s	β^{+}, SF (<0.05%)	(various)	
^{249}Md	101	148	249.08286(18)	1973	25.6(9) s	α (75%)	^{245}Es	(7/2−)
^{249}Md	101	148	249.08286(18)	1973	25.6(9) s	β^{+} (25%)	^{249}Fm	(7/2−)
^{249m1}Md	100(100)# keV			2001	1.5+1.2 −0.5 s [1.9(9) s]	α	^{245}Es	(1/2−)
^{249m2}Md	≥910# keV			2021	2.8(5) ms			(19/2−)
^{250}Md	101	149	250.084165(98)	1973	54(4) s	β^{+} (93.0%)	^{250}Fm	2−#
^{250}Md	101	149	250.084165(98)	1973	54(4) s	α (7.0%)	^{246}Es	2−#
^{250}Md	101	149	250.084165(98)	1973	54(4) s	β^{+}, SF (0.026%)	(various)	2−#
^{250m}Md	120(40) keV			2019	42.4(45) s	α	^{246}Es	7+#
^{251}Md	101	150	251.084774(20)	1973	4.21(23) min	β^{+} (90%)	^{251}Fm	(7/2−)
^{251}Md	101	150	251.084774(20)	1973	4.21(23) min	α (10%)	^{247}Es	(7/2−)
^{251m}Md	53(8) keV			2021	20# s			(1/2−)
^{252}Md	101	151	252.086385(98)	1973	2.3(8) min	β^{+}	^{252}Fm	1+#
^{253}Md	101	152	253.087143(34)#	1992	6.4+11.6 −3.6 min [12(8) min]	β^{+} (~99.3%)	^{253}Fm	(7/2−)
^{253}Md	101	152	253.087143(34)#	1992	6.4+11.6 −3.6 min [12(8) min]	α (~0.7%)	^{249}Es	(7/2−)
^{253m}Md	60(30) keV			(1971) (Note: Half-life not measured, not included in discovery database)	1# min			1/2−#
^{254}Md	101	153	254.08959(11)#	1970	10(3) min	β^{+}	^{254}Fm	0−#
^{254m}Md	50(100)# keV			1970	28(8) min	β^{+}	^{254}Fm	3−#
^{255}Md	101	154	255.0910817(60)	1958	27(2) min	β^{+} (93%)	^{255}Fm	7/2−
^{255}Md	101	154	255.0910817(60)	1958	27(2) min	α (7%)	^{251}Es	7/2−
^{256}Md	101	155	256.09389(13)#	1955	77.7(18) min	β^{+} (90.8%)	^{256}Fm	(1−)
^{256}Md	101	155	256.09389(13)#	1955	77.7(18) min	α (9.2%)	^{252}Es	(1−)
^{256}Md	101	155	256.09389(13)#	1955	77.7(18) min	SF (<3%)	(various)	(1−)
^{257}Md	101	156	257.0955373(17)	1965	5.52(5) h	EC (85%)	^{257}Fm	(7/2−)
^{257}Md	101	156	257.0955373(17)	1965	5.52(5) h	α (15%)	^{253}Es	(7/2−)
^{258}Md	101	157	258.0984336(37)	1970	51.59(29) d	α	^{254}Es	8−#
^{258}Md	101	157	258.0984336(37)	1970	51.59(29) d	β^{−} (<0.0015%)	^{258}No	8−#
^{258}Md	101	157	258.0984336(37)	1970	51.59(29) d	β^{+} (<0.0015%)	^{258}Fm	8−#
^{258m}Md	0(200)# keV			1980	57.0(9) min	EC (85%)	^{258}Fm	1−#
^{258m}Md	0(200)# keV			1980	57.0(9) min	SF (<15%)	(various)	1−#
^{258m}Md	0(200)# keV			1980	57.0(9) min	α (<1.2%)	^{254}Es	1−#
^{259}Md (Note: Not directly synthesized, occurs as decay product of ^{259}No)	101	158	259.10045(11)#	1982	1.60(6) h	SF	(various)	7/2−#
^{260}Md	101	159	260.10365(34)#	1989	27.8(8) d	SF	(various)	
^{260}Md	101	159	260.10365(34)#	1989	27.8(8) d	α (<5%)	^{256}Es	
^{260}Md	101	159	260.10365(34)#	1989	27.8(8) d	EC (<5%)	^{260}Fm	
^{260}Md	101	159	260.10365(34)#	1989	27.8(8) d	β^{−} (<3.5%)	^{260}No	
This table header & footer:
