= Isotopes of seaborgium =

Isotopes of seaborgium (_{106}Sg)
Main isotopes			Decay	
Isotope	abundance	half-life (t_{1/2})	mode	product
^{265}Sg	synth	8.5 s	α	^{261}Rf
^{265m}Sg	synth	14.4 s	α	^{261m}Rf
^{267}Sg	synth	9.8 min	α	^{263m}Rf
^{267m}Sg	synth	100 s	SF	
^{268}Sg	synth	13 s	SF	
^{269}Sg	synth	13 min	α 87%	^{265}Rf
^{269}Sg	synth	13 min	SF 13%	
^{271}Sg	synth	31 s	α73%	^{267}Rf
^{271}Sg	synth	31 s	SF27%	

Seaborgium (_{106}Sg) is a synthetic element and so has no stable isotopes. A standard atomic weight cannot be given. The first isotope to be synthesized was ^{263}Sg in 1974. There are fourteen known radioisotopes from ^{257}Sg to ^{271}Sg (except ^{270}Sg) and five known isomers (^{259m}Sg, ^{261m}Sg, ^{263m}Sg, ^{265m}Sg, and ^{267m}Sg). The longest-lived isotopes are ^{269}Sg with a half-life of 13 minutes and ^{267}Sg with a half-life of 9.8 minutes. Due to a low number of measurements, and the consequent overlapping measurement uncertainties at the confidence level corresponding to one standard deviation, a definite assignment of the most stable isotope cannot be made.

== List of isotopes ==
Nuclide (Note: ^{m}Sg – Excited nuclear isomer.)	Z	N	Isotopic mass (Da) (Note: ( ) – Uncertainty (1σ) is given in concise form in parentheses after the corresponding last digits.) (Note: # – Atomic mass marked #: value and uncertainty derived not from purely experimental data, but at least partly from trends from the Mass Surface (TMS).)	Discovery year	Half-life	Decay mode (Note: Modes of decay: SF: / Spontaneous fission)	Daughter isotope	Spin and parity (Note: # – Values marked # are not purely derived from experimental data, but at least partly from trends of neighboring nuclides (TNN).)
Nuclide	Excitation energy			Discovery year	Half-life	Decay mode	Daughter isotope	Spin and parity
^{257}Sg	106	151		2025	12.6+3.7 −2.3 ms	SF (~90%)	(various)	(9/2−)
^{257}Sg	106	151		2025	12.6+3.7 −2.3 ms	α (~10%)	^{253m1}Rf	(9/2−)
^{258}Sg	106	152	258.11304(44)#	1997	2.6+0.6 −0.4 ms [2.7(5) ms]	SF	(various)	0+
^{259}Sg	106	153	259.11435(19)#	1985	402(56) ms	α	^{255}Rf	(11/2−)
^{259}Sg	106	153	259.11435(19)#	1985	402(56) ms	β^{+}?	^{259}Db	(11/2−)
^{259}Sg	106	153	259.11435(19)#	1985	402(56) ms	SF?	(various)	(11/2−)
^{259m}Sg	87 keV			2015	226(27) ms	α (97%)	^{255}Rf	(1/2+)
^{259m}Sg	87 keV			2015	226(27) ms	SF (3%)	(various)	(1/2+)
^{259m}Sg	87 keV			2015	226(27) ms	β^{+}?	^{259}Db	(1/2+)
^{260}Sg	106	154	260.114383(22)	1984	4.95(33) ms	SF (71%)	(various)	0+
^{260}Sg	106	154	260.114383(22)	1984	4.95(33) ms	α (29%)	^{256}Rf	0+
^{261}Sg	106	155	261.115948(20)	1984	183(5) ms	α (98.1%)	^{257}Rf	(3/2+)
^{261}Sg	106	155	261.115948(20)	1984	183(5) ms	β^{+} (1.3%)	^{261}Db	(3/2+)
^{261}Sg	106	155	261.115948(20)	1984	183(5) ms	SF (0.6%)	(various)	(3/2+)
^{261m}Sg	100(50)# keV			2010	9.0+2.0 −1.5 μs [9.3(1.8) μs]	IT	^{261}Sg	7/2+#
^{262}Sg	106	156	262.116339(24)	2001	10.3(1.7) ms	SF (94%)	(various)	0+
^{262}Sg	106	156	262.116339(24)	2001	10.3(1.7) ms	α (6%)	^{258}Rf	0+
^{263}Sg	106	157	263.11830(10)#	1974	940(140) ms	α (87%)	^{259}Rf	3/2+#
^{263}Sg	106	157	263.11830(10)#	1974	940(140) ms	SF (13%)	(various)	3/2+#
^{263m}Sg	51(19)# keV			1998	420(100) ms	α	^{259}Rf	7/2+#
^{264}Sg	106	158	264.11893(30)#	2006	68+32 −16 ms [78(25) ms]	SF	(various)	0+
^{265}Sg	106	159	265.12109(15)#	1994	9.2(1.6) s	α	^{261}Rf	11/2−#
^{265m}Sg (Note: Order of ground state and isomer is uncertain.)	−10(160) keV#			2008	16.4(2.4) s	α	^{261m}Rf	
^{266}Sg (Note: Not directly synthesized, occurs as decay product of ^{270}Hs)	106	160	266.12197(26)#	2006	390(110) ms	SF	(various)	0+
^{267}Sg (Note: Not directly synthesized, occurs as decay product of ^{271}Hs)	106	161	267.12432(28)#	2008	9.8+11.3 −4.5 min	α	^{263m}Rf	9/2#
^{267m}Sg (Note: Not directly synthesized, occurs as decay product of ^{275}Ds)	110 keV#			2024	100+92 −39 s	SF	(various)	1/2#
^{268}Sg (Note: Not directly synthesized, occurs as decay product of ^{276}Ds)	106	162	268.12539(50)#	2023	13+17 −4 s	SF	(various)	0+
^{269}Sg (Note: Not directly synthesized, occurs in the decay chain of ^{285}Fl)	106	163	269.12850(40)#	2010	13+6 −4 min	α (87%)	^{265}Rf	
^{269}Sg	106	163	269.12850(40)#	2010	13+6 −4 min	SF (13%)	(various)	
^{271}Sg (Note: Not directly synthesized, occurs in the decay chain of ^{287}Fl)	106	165	271.13378(63)#	2004	31+13 −7 s	α (73%)	^{267}Rf	3/2+#
^{271}Sg	106	165	271.13378(63)#	2004	31+13 −7 s	SF (27%)	(various)	3/2+#
This table header & footer:

== Nucleosynthesis ==
Target	Projectile	CN	Attempt result
^{208}Pb	^{54}Cr	^{262}Sg	Successful reaction
^{207}Pb	^{54}Cr	^{261}Sg	Successful reaction
^{206}Pb	^{54}Cr	^{260}Sg	Failure to date
^{208}Pb	^{52}Cr	^{260}Sg	Successful reaction
^{209}Bi	^{51}V	^{260}Sg	Successful reaction
^{238}U	^{30}Si	^{268}Sg	Successful reaction
^{244}Pu	^{26}Mg	^{270}Sg	Reaction yet to be attempted
^{248}Cm	^{22}Ne	^{270}Sg	Successful reaction
^{249}Cf	^{18}O	^{267}Sg	Successful reaction

=== Cold fusion ===
This section deals with the synthesis of nuclei of seaborgium by so-called "cold" fusion reactions. These are processes that create compound nuclei at low excitation energy (~10–20 MeV, hence "cold"), leading to a higher probability of survival from fission. The excited nucleus then decays to the ground state via the emission of one or two neutrons only.

==== ^{208}Pb(^{54}Cr,xn)^{262−x}Sg (x=1,2,3) ====
The first attempt to synthesise seaborgium in cold fusion reactions was performed in September 1974 by a Soviet team led by G. N. Flerov at the Joint Institute for Nuclear Research at Dubna. They reported producing a 0.48 s spontaneous fission (SF) activity, which they assigned to the isotope ^{259}Sg. Based on later evidence it was suggested that the team most likely measured the decay of ^{260}Sg and its daughter ^{256}Rf. The TWG concluded that, at the time, the results were insufficiently convincing.

The Dubna team revisited this problem in 1983–1984 and were able to detect a 5 ms SF activity assigned directly to ^{260}Sg.

The team at GSI studied this reaction for the first time in 1985 using the improved method of correlation of genetic parent-daughter decays. They were able to detect ^{261}Sg (x=1) and ^{260}Sg and measured a partial 1n neutron evaporation excitation function.

In December 2000, the reaction was studied by a team at GANIL, France; they were able to detect 10 atoms of ^{261}Sg and 2 atoms of ^{260}Sg to add to previous data on the reaction.

After a facility upgrade, the GSI team measured the 1n excitation function in 2003 using a metallic lead target. Of significance, in May 2003, the team successfully replaced the lead-208 target with more resistant lead(II) sulfide targets (PbS), which will allow more intense beams to be used in the future. They were able to measure the 1n,2n and 3n excitation functions and performed the first detailed alpha-gamma spectroscopy on the isotope ^{261}Sg. They detected ~1600 atoms of the isotope and identified new alpha lines as well as measuring a more accurate half-life and new EC and SF branchings. Furthermore, they were able to detect the K X-rays from the daughter rutherfordium isotope for the first time. They were also able to provide improved data for ^{260}Sg, including the tentative observation of an isomeric level. The study was continued in September 2005 and March 2006. The accumulated work on ^{261}Sg was published in 2007. Work in September 2005 also aimed to begin spectroscopic studies on ^{260}Sg.

The team at the LBNL recently restudied this reaction in an effort to look at the spectroscopy of the isotope ^{261}Sg. They were able to detect a new isomer, ^{261m}Sg, decaying by internal conversion into the ground state. In the same experiment, they were also able to confirm a K-isomer in the daughter ^{257}Rf, namely ^{257m2}Rf.

==== ^{207}Pb(^{54}Cr,xn)^{261−x}Sg (x=1,2) ====
The team at Dubna also studied this reaction in 1974 with identical results as for their first experiments with a lead-208 target. The SF activities were first assigned to ^{259}Sg and later to ^{260}Sg and/or ^{256}Rf. Further work in 1983–1984 also detected a 5 ms SF activity assigned to the parent ^{260}Sg.

The GSI team studied this reaction for the first time in 1985 using the method of correlation of genetic parent-daughter decays. They were able to positively identify ^{259}Sg as a product from the 2n neutron evaporation channel.

The reaction was further used in March 2005 using PbS targets to begin a spectroscopic study of the even-even isotope ^{260}Sg.

==== ^{206}Pb(^{54}Cr,xn)^{260−x}Sg ====
This reaction was studied in 1974 by the team at Dubna. It was used to assist them in their assignment of the observed SF activities in reactions using Pb-207 and Pb-208 targets. They were unable to detect any SF, indicating the formation of isotopes decaying primarily by alpha decay.

==== ^{208}Pb(^{52}Cr,xn)^{260−x}Sg (x=1,2) ====
The team at Dubna also studied this reaction in their series of cold fusion reactions performed in 1974. Once again they were unable to detect any SF activities. The reaction was revisited in 2006 by the team at LBNL as part of their studies on the effect of the isospin of the projectile and hence the mass number of the compound nucleus on the yield of evaporation residues. They were able to identify ^{259}Sg and ^{258}Sg in their measurement of the 1n excitation function.

==== ^{209}Bi(^{51}V,xn)^{260−x}Sg (x=2) ====
The team at Dubna also studied this reaction in their series of cold fusion reactions performed in 1974. Once again they were unable to detect any SF activities. In 1994, the synthesis of seaborgium was revisited using this reaction by the GSI team, in order to study the new even-even isotope ^{258}Sg. Ten atoms of ^{258}Sg were detected and decayed by spontaneous fission.

=== Hot fusion ===
This section deals with the synthesis of nuclei of seaborgium by so-called "hot" fusion reactions. These are processes that create compound nuclei at high excitation energy (~40–50 MeV, hence "hot"), leading to a reduced probability of survival from fission and quasi-fission. The excited nucleus then decays to the ground state via the emission of 3–5 neutrons.

==== ^{238}U(^{30}Si,xn)^{268−x}Sg (x=3,4,5,6) ====
This reaction was first studied by Japanese scientists at the Japan Atomic Energy Research Institute (JAERI) in 1998. They detected a spontaneous fission activity, which they tentatively assigned to the new isotope ^{264}Sg or ^{263}Db, formed by EC of ^{263}Sg. In 2006, the teams at GSI and LBNL both studied this reaction using the method of correlation of genetic parent-daughter decays. The LBNL team measured an excitation function for the 4n,5n and 6n channels, whilst the GSI team were able to observe an additional 3n activity. Both teams were able to identify the new isotope ^{264}Sg, which decayed with a short lifetime by spontaneous fission.

==== ^{248}Cm(^{22}Ne,xn)^{270−x}Sg (x=4?,5) ====
In 1993, at Dubna, Yuri Lazarev and his team announced the discovery of long-lived ^{266}Sg and ^{265}Sg produced in the 4n and 5n channels of this nuclear reaction following the search for seaborgium isotopes suitable for a first chemical study. It was announced that ^{266}Sg decayed by 8.57 MeV alpha-particle emission with a projected half-life of ~20 s, lending strong support to the stabilising effect of the Z = 108, N = 162 closed shells. This reaction was studied further in 1997 by a team at GSI and the yield, decay mode and half-lives for ^{266}Sg and ^{265}Sg have been confirmed, although there are still some discrepancies. In the synthesis of ^{270}Hs (see hassium), ^{266}Sg was found to undergo exclusively SF with a short half-life (T_{SF} = 360 ms). It is possible that this is the ground state, (^{266g}Sg) and that the other activity, produced directly, belongs to a high spin K-isomer, ^{266m}Sg, but further results are required to confirm this.

A recent re-evaluation of the decay characteristics of ^{265}Sg and ^{266}Sg has suggested that all decays to date in this reaction were in fact from ^{265}Sg, which exists in two isomeric forms. The first, ^{265a}Sg has a principal alpha-line at 8.85 MeV and a calculated half-life of 8.9 s, while ^{265b}Sg has a decay energy of 8.70 MeV and a half-life of 16.2 s. Both isomeric levels are populated when produced directly. Data from the decay of ^{269}Hs indicates that ^{265b}Sg is produced during the decay of ^{269}Hs and that ^{265b}Sg decays into the shorter-lived ^{261g}Rf isotope. This contradicts the assignment of the long-lived alpha activity to ^{266}Sg, instead suggesting that ^{266}Sg undergoes fission in a short time.

Regardless of these assignments, the reaction has been successfully used to study the chemistry of seaborgium.

==== ^{249}Cf(^{18}O,xn)^{267−x}Sg (x=4) ====
The synthesis of seaborgium was first realized in 1974 by the LBNL/LLNL team. In their discovery experiment, they were able to apply the new method of correlation of genetic parent-daughter decays to identify the new isotope ^{263}Sg. In 1975, the team at Oak Ridge were able to confirm the decay data but were unable to identify coincident X-rays in order to prove that seaborgium was produced. In 1979, the team at Dubna studied the reaction by detection of SF activities. In comparison with data from Berkeley, they calculated a 70% SF branching for ^{263}Sg. The original synthesis and discovery reaction was confirmed in 1994 by a different team at LBNL.

=== Decay products ===
Isotopes of seaborgium have also been observed in the decay of heavier elements. Observations to date are summarised in the table below:

Evaporation Residue	Observed Sg isotope
^{291}Lv, ^{287}Fl, ^{283}Cn	^{271}Sg
^{285}Fl	^{269}Sg
^{276}Ds, ^{272}Hs	^{268}Sg
^{275}Ds, ^{271}Hs	^{267}Sg
^{270}Hs	^{266}Sg
^{277}Cn, ^{273}Ds, ^{269}Hs	^{265}Sg
^{271}Ds, ^{267}Hs	^{263}Sg
^{270}Ds	^{262}Sg
^{269}Ds, ^{265}Hs	^{261}Sg
^{264}Hs	^{260}Sg

== Isomerism ==
=== ^{266}Sg ===
Initial work identified an 8.63 MeV alpha-decaying activity with a half-life of ~21 s and assigned to the ground state of ^{266}Sg. Later work identified a nuclide decaying by 8.52 and 8.77 MeV alpha emission with a half-life of ~21 s, which is unusual for an even-even nuclide. Recent work on the synthesis of ^{270}Hs identified ^{266}Sg decaying by SF with a short 360 ms half-life. The recent work on ^{277}Cn and ^{269}Hs has provided new information on the decay of ^{265}Sg and ^{261}Rf. This work suggested that the initial 8.77 MeV activity should be reassigned to ^{265}Sg. Therefore, the current information suggests that the SF activity is the ground state and the 8.52 MeV activity is a high spin K-isomer. Further work is required to confirm these assignments. A recent re-evaluation of the data has suggested that the 8.52 MeV activity should be associated with ^{265}Sg and that ^{266}Sg only undergoes fission.

=== ^{265}Sg ===
The recent direct synthesis of ^{265}Sg resulted in four alpha-lines at 8.94, 8.84, 8.76 and 8.69 MeV with a half-life of 7.4 seconds. The observation of the decay of ^{265}Sg from the decay of ^{277}Cn and ^{269}Hs indicated that the 8.69 MeV line may be associated with an isomeric level with an associated half-life of ~ 20 s. It is plausible that this level is causing confusion between assignments of ^{266}Sg and ^{265}Sg since both can decay to fissioning rutherfordium isotopes.

A recent re-evaluation of the data has indicated that there are indeed two isomers, one with a principal decay energy of 8.85 MeV with a half-life of 8.9 s, and a second isomer that decays with energy 8.70 MeV with a half-life of 16.2 s.

=== ^{263}Sg ===
The discovery synthesis of ^{263}Sg resulted in an alpha-line at 9.06 MeV. Observation of this nuclide by decay of ^{271g}Ds,^{271m}Ds and ^{267}Hs has confirmed an isomer decaying by 9.25 MeV alpha emission. The 9.06 MeV decay was also confirmed. The 9.06 MeV activity has been assigned to the ground state isomer with an associated half-life of 0.3 s. The 9.25 MeV activity has been assigned to an isomeric level decaying with a half-life of 0.9 s.

Recent work on the synthesis of ^{271g,m}Ds was resulted in some confusing data regarding the decay of ^{267}Hs. In one such decay, ^{267}Hs decayed to ^{263}Sg, which decayed by alpha emission with a half-life of ~ 6 s. This activity has not yet been positively assigned to an isomer and further research is required.

== Spectroscopic decay schemes ==
=== ^{261}Sg ===
This is the currently accepted decay scheme for ^{261}Sg from the study by Streicher et al. at GSI in 2003–2006

== Retracted isotopes ==
=== ^{269}Sg ===
In the claimed synthesis of ^{293}Og in 1999 the isotope ^{269}Sg was identified as a daughter product. It decayed by 8.74 MeV alpha emission with a half-life of 22 s. The claim was retracted in 2001. This isotope was finally created in 2010.

== Chemical yields of isotopes ==
=== Cold fusion ===
The table below provides cross-sections and excitation energies for cold fusion reactions producing seaborgium isotopes directly. Data in bold represents maxima derived from excitation function measurements. + represents an observed exit channel.

Projectile	Target	CN	1n	2n	3n
^{54}Cr	^{207}Pb	^{261}Sg			
^{54}Cr	^{208}Pb	^{262}Sg	**4.23 nb, 13.0 MeV**	**500 pb**	10 pb
^{51}V	^{209}Bi	^{260}Sg		**38 pb, 21.5 MeV**	
^{52}Cr	^{208}Pb	^{260}Sg	**281 pb, 11.0 MeV**		

=== Hot fusion ===
The table below provides cross-sections and excitation energies for hot fusion reactions producing seaborgium isotopes directly. Data in bold represents maxima derived from excitation function measurements. + represents an observed exit channel.

Projectile	Target	CN	3n	4n	5n	6n
^{30}Si	^{238}U	^{268}Sg	+	9 pb, 40.0	**~ 80 pb, 51.0 MeV**	**~30 pb, 58.0 MeV**
^{22}Ne	^{248}Cm	^{270}Sg		~25 pb	~250 pb	
^{18}O	^{249}Cf	^{267}Sg		+		
