= Isotopes of einsteinium =

Isotopes of einsteinium (_{99}Es)
Main isotopes			Decay	
Isotope	abundance	half-life (t_{1/2})	mode	product
^{252}Es	synth	471.7 d	α	^{248}Bk
^{252}Es	synth	471.7 d	ε	^{252}Cf
^{253}Es	synth	20.47 d	α	^{249}Bk
^{253}Es	synth	20.47 d	SF	–
^{254}Es	synth	275.7 d	α	^{250}Bk
^{254}Es	synth	275.7 d	β^{−}	^{254}Fm
^{255}Es	synth	39.8 d	β^{−}	^{255}Fm
^{255}Es	synth	39.8 d	α	^{251}Bk
^{255}Es	synth	39.8 d	SF	–

Einsteinium (_{99}Es) is a synthetic element, and thus a standard atomic weight cannot be given. Like all synthetic elements, it has no stable isotopes. The first isotope to be discovered (in nuclear fallout from the Ivy Mike H-bomb test) was ^{253}Es in 1952. There are 18 known radioisotopes, from ^{240}Es to ^{257}Es, and 8 nuclear isomers. The longest-lived isotope is ^{252}Es with a half-life of 471.7 days or 1.291 years; the second longest, ^{254}Es with half-life of 275.7 days is more available.

== List of isotopes ==
Nuclide (Note: ^{m}Es – Excited nuclear isomer.)	Z	N	Isotopic mass (Da) (Note: ( ) – Uncertainty (1σ) is given in concise form in parentheses after the corresponding last digits.) (Note: # – Atomic mass marked #: value and uncertainty derived not from purely experimental data, but at least partly from trends from the Mass Surface (TMS).)	Discovery year	Half-life	Decay mode (Note: Modes of decay: EC: / Electron capture; IT: / Isomeric transition; SF: / Spontaneous fission)	Daughter isotope	Spin and parity (Note: ( ) spin value – Indicates spin with weak assignment arguments.) (Note: # – Values marked # are not purely derived from experimental data, but at least partly from trends of neighboring nuclides (TNN).)
Nuclide	Excitation energy			Discovery year	Half-life	Decay mode	Daughter isotope	Spin and parity
^{240}Es	99	141	240.06895(39)#	2017	6.0(17) s	α (70%)	^{236}Bk	4−#
^{240}Es	99	141	240.06895(39)#	2017	6.0(17) s	β^{+} (30%)	^{240}Cf	4−#
^{240}Es	99	141	240.06895(39)#	2017	6.0(17) s	β^{+}, SF (0.16%)	(various)	4−#
^{241}Es	99	142	241.06859(25)#	1996	4.3+2.4 −1.2 s	α	^{237}Bk (Note: Although ^{237}Bk has been populated, no properties of this isotope are known.)	3/2−#
^{242}Es	99	143	242.06957(28)#	1994	16.9(8) s	β^{+}	^{242}Cf	2+#
^{242}Es	99	143	242.06957(28)#	1994	16.9(8) s	α (41%)	^{238}Bk	2+#
^{242}Es	99	143	242.06957(28)#	1994	16.9(8) s	β^{+}, SF (1.5%)	(various)	2+#
^{243}Es	99	144	243.06951(22)#	1973	22.1(14) s	α (61%)	^{239}Bk	(7/2+)
^{243}Es	99	144	243.06951(22)#	1973	22.1(14) s	β^{+}? (39%)	^{243}Cf	(7/2+)
^{243m}Es (Note: Order of ground state and isomer is uncertain.)	50(50)# keV			2025	>50# μs	IT?	^{243}Es	3/2−#
^{243m}Es	50(50)# keV			2025	>50# μs	α?	^{239}Bk	3/2−#
^{243m}Es	50(50)# keV			2025	>50# μs	β^{+}?	^{243}Cf	3/2−#
^{244}Es	99	145	244.07088(20)#	1973	37(4) s	β^{+} (95%)	^{244}Cf	6+#
^{244}Es	99	145	244.07088(20)#	1973	37(4) s	α (5%)	^{240}Bk	6+#
^{244}Es	99	145	244.07088(20)#	1973	37(4) s	β^{+}, SF (0.011%)	(various)	6+#
^{245}Es	99	146	245.07119(18)#	1967	1.11(6) min	β^{+} (51%)	^{245}Cf	(3/2−)
^{245}Es	99	146	245.07119(18)#	1967	1.11(6) min	α (49%)	^{241}Bk	(3/2−)
^{245m}Es	30(15)# keV			(1967) (Note: Half-life not measured, not included in discovery database)	>50# μs	IT?	^{245}Es	7/2+#
^{245m}Es	30(15)# keV			(1967)	>50# μs	α?	^{241}Bk	7/2+#
^{245m}Es	30(15)# keV			(1967)	>50# μs	β^{+}?	^{245}Cf	7/2+#
^{246}Es	99	147	246.07281(10)	1954	7.5(5) min	β^{+} (90.1%)	^{246}Cf	4−#
^{246}Es	99	147	246.07281(10)	1954	7.5(5) min	α (9.9%)	^{242}Bk	4−#
^{246}Es	99	147	246.07281(10)	1954	7.5(5) min	β^{+}, SF (0.003%)	(various)	4−#
^{247}Es	99	148	247.073622(21)	1967	4.55(26) min	β^{+} (93%)	^{247}Cf	(7/2+)
^{247}Es	99	148	247.073622(21)	1967	4.55(26) min	α (7%)	^{243}Bk	(7/2+)
^{247m}Es	50(50)# keV			(2001)	>20# μs	IT?	^{247}Es	(3/2−)
^{247m}Es	50(50)# keV			(2001)	>20# μs	α?	^{243}Bk	(3/2−)
^{247m}Es	50(50)# keV			(2001)	>20# μs	β^{+}	^{247}Cf	(3/2−)
^{248}Es	99	149	248.07547(6)#	1956	24(3) min	β^{+} (99.75%)	^{248}Cf	2−#
^{248}Es	99	149	248.07547(6)#	1956	24(3) min	α (0.25%)	^{244}Bk	2−#
^{248}Es	99	149	248.07547(6)#	1956	24(3) min	β^{+}, SF (3.5×10^{−4}%)	(various)	2−#
^{249}Es	99	150	249.07641(3)#	1956	102.2(6) min	β^{+} (99.43%)	^{249}Cf	7/2+
^{249}Es	99	150	249.07641(3)#	1956	102.2(6) min	α (0.57%)	^{245}Bk	7/2+
^{250}Es	99	151	250.07861(11)#	1956	8.6(1) h	β^{+}	^{250}Cf	6(+)
^{250m}Es	200(150)# keV			1970	2.22(5) h	β^{+}	^{250}Cf	1(−)
^{251}Es	99	152	251.079991(6)	1956	33(1) h	EC (99.5%)	^{251}Cf	3/2−
^{251}Es	99	152	251.079991(6)	1956	33(1) h	α (0.5%)	^{247}Bk	3/2−
^{251m}Es	8.4(10) keV			----	>200# μs	IT?	^{251}Es	(7/2+)
^{251m}Es	8.4(10) keV			----	>200# μs	EC?	^{251}Cf	(7/2+)
^{252}Es	99	153	252.08298(5)	1956	471.7(19) d	α (78%)	^{248}Bk	(4+)
^{252}Es	99	153	252.08298(5)	1956	471.7(19) d	EC (22%)	^{252}Cf	(4+)
^{253}Es	99	154	253.0848212(13)	1954	20.47(3) d	α	^{249}Bk	7/2+
^{253}Es	99	154	253.0848212(13)	1954	20.47(3) d	SF (8.7×10^{−6}%)	(various)	7/2+
^{253m}Es	106(4) keV			(1993)	>10# μs	IT?	^{253}Es	3/2−#
^{254}Es	99	155	254.088024(3)	1954	275.7(5) d	α (Note: Theoretically capable of electron capture to ^{254}Cf)	^{250}Bk	7+
^{254}Es	99	155	254.088024(3)	1954	275.7(5) d	β^{−} (1.74×10^{−4}%)	^{254}Fm	7+
^{254}Es	99	155	254.088024(3)	1954	275.7(5) d	SF (<3×10^{−6}%)	(various)	7+
^{254m}Es	80.4(11) keV			1956	39.3(2) h	β^{−} (98%)	^{254}Fm	2+
^{254m}Es	80.4(11) keV			1956	39.3(2) h	IT (<3%)	^{254}Es	2+
^{254m}Es	80.4(11) keV			1956	39.3(2) h	α (0.32%)	^{250}Bk	2+
^{254m}Es	80.4(11) keV			1956	39.3(2) h	EC (0.076%)	^{254}Cf	2+
^{254m}Es	80.4(11) keV			1956	39.3(2) h	SF (<0.045%)	(various)	2+
^{255}Es	99	156	255.090274(12)	1954	39.8(12) d	β^{−} (92.0%)	^{255}Fm	(7/2+)
^{255}Es	99	156	255.090274(12)	1954	39.8(12) d	α (8.0%)	^{251}Bk	(7/2+)
^{255}Es	99	156	255.090274(12)	1954	39.8(12) d	SF (0.0041%)	(various)	(7/2+)
^{256}Es	99	157	256.09360(11)#	1981	7.6 h	β^{−}	^{256}Fm	7+#
^{256}Es	99	157	256.09360(11)#	1981	7.6 h	β^{−}, SF (0.002%)	(various)	7+#
^{256m}Es	0(100)# keV			1989	25.4(12) min	β^{−}	^{256}Fm	0+#
^{257}Es	99	158	257.09598(44)#	1987	7.7(2) d	β^{−}	^{257}Fm	7/2+#
This table header & footer:
