= Isotopes of fermium =

Isotopes of fermium (_{100}Fm)
Main isotopes			Decay	
Isotope	abundance	half-life (t_{1/2})	mode	product
^{252}Fm	synth	25.39 h	α	^{248}Cf
^{252}Fm	synth	25.39 h	SF	–
^{253}Fm	synth	3 d	ε	^{253}Es
^{253}Fm	synth	3 d	α	^{249}Cf
^{255}Fm	synth	20.07 h	α	^{251}Cf
^{255}Fm	synth	20.07 h	SF	–
^{257}Fm	synth	100.5 d	α	^{253}Cf
^{257}Fm	synth	100.5 d	SF	–

Fermium (_{100}Fm) is a synthetic element, and thus a standard atomic weight cannot be given. Like all artificial elements, it has no stable isotopes. The first isotope to be discovered (in nuclear fallout from the Ivy Mike H-bomb test) was ^{255}Fm in 1952. ^{250}Fm was independently synthesized (to establish priority if the former result had to remain classified) shortly after the discovery of ^{255}Fm.

There are 20 known radioisotopes ranging in atomic mass from ^{241}Fm to ^{260}Fm (^{260}Fm is unconfirmed), and 5 nuclear isomers. The longest-lived isotope is ^{257}Fm with a half-life of 100.5 days, and the longest-lived isomer is ^{247m}Fm with a half-life of 5.1 seconds.

== List of isotopes ==
Nuclide (Note: ^{m}Fm – Excited nuclear isomer.)	Z	N	Isotopic mass (Da) (Note: ( ) – Uncertainty (1σ) is given in concise form in parentheses after the corresponding last digits.) (Note: # – Atomic mass marked #: value and uncertainty derived not from purely experimental data, but at least partly from trends from the Mass Surface (TMS).)	Discovery year	Half-life	Decay mode (Note: Modes of decay: EC: / Electron capture; IT: / Isomeric transition; SF: / Spontaneous fission)	Daughter isotope	Spin and parity (Note: ( ) spin value – Indicates spin with weak assignment arguments.) (Note: # – Values marked # are not purely derived from experimental data, but at least partly from trends of neighboring nuclides (TNN).)
Nuclide	Excitation energy			Discovery year	Half-life	Decay mode	Daughter isotope	Spin and parity
^{241}Fm	100	141	241.07431(32)#	2008	730(60) μs	SF	(various)	5/2+#
^{241}Fm	100	141	241.07431(32)#	2008	730(60) μs	α (<14%)	^{237}Cf	5/2+#
^{241}Fm	100	141	241.07431(32)#	2008	730(60) μs	β^{+} (<12%)	^{241}Es	5/2+#
^{242}Fm	100	142	242.07343(43)#	1975	0.8(2) ms	SF	(various)	0+
^{243}Fm	100	143	243.07441(14)#	1981	231(9) ms	α (91%)	^{239}Cf	7/2−#
^{243}Fm	100	143	243.07441(14)#	1981	231(9) ms	SF (9%)	(various)	7/2−#
^{244}Fm	100	144	244.07404(22)#	1967	3.12(8) ms	SF (>97%)	(various)	0+
^{244}Fm	100	144	244.07404(22)#	1967	3.12(8) ms	β^{+} (<2%)	^{244}Es	0+
^{244}Fm	100	144	244.07404(22)#	1967	3.12(8) ms	α (<1%)	^{240}Cf	0+
^{245}Fm	100	145	245.07535(21)#	1967	4.2(13) s	α (88.5%)	^{241}Cf	1/2+#
^{245}Fm	100	145	245.07535(21)#	1967	4.2(13) s	β^{+} (11.5%)	^{245}Es	1/2+#
^{245}Fm	100	145	245.07535(21)#	1967	4.2(13) s	SF (<0.3%)	(various)	1/2+#
^{246}Fm	100	146	246.075353(15)	1966	1.54(4) s	α (93.2%)	^{242}Cf	0+
^{246}Fm	100	146	246.075353(15)	1966	1.54(4) s	SF (6.8%)	(various)	0+
^{246}Fm	100	146	246.075353(15)	1966	1.54(4) s	EC (<1.3%)	^{246}Es	0+
^{247}Fm	100	147	247.07694(19)#	1967	31(1) s	α (~64%)	^{243}Cf	(7/2+)
^{247}Fm	100	147	247.07694(19)#	1967	31(1) s	β^{+}? (~36%)	^{247}Es	(7/2+)
^{247m}Fm	49(8) keV			1967	5.1(2) s	α (88%)	^{243}Cf	(1/2+)
^{247m}Fm	49(8) keV			1967	5.1(2) s	IT? (12%)	^{247}Fm	(1/2+)
^{248}Fm	100	148	248.077185(9)	1958	34.5(12) s	α (99.9%)	^{244}Cf	0+
^{248}Fm	100	148	248.077185(9)	1958	34.5(12) s	SF (0.1%)	(various)	0+
^{248m}Fm	1200(100)# keV			(2010) (Note: Only published in a conference proceeding and not a refereed journal)	10.1(6) ms	IT?	^{248}Fm	6+#
^{248m}Fm	1200(100)# keV			(2010)	10.1(6) ms	α?	^{244}Cf	6+#
^{248m}Fm	1200(100)# keV			(2010)	10.1(6) ms	β^{+}?	^{248}Es	6+#
^{249}Fm	100	149	249.078926(7)	1959	1.6(1) min	β^{+}? (67%)	^{249}Es	7/2+
^{249}Fm	100	149	249.078926(7)	1959	1.6(1) min	α (33%)	^{245}Cf	7/2+
^{250}Fm	100	150	250.079520(8)	1954	31.0(11) min	α (99.99%)	^{246}Cf	0+
^{250}Fm	100	150	250.079520(8)	1954	31.0(11) min	SF (6.9×10^{−3}%)	(various)	0+
^{250m}Fm	1199.2(10) keV			1971	1.92(5) s	IT	^{250}Fm	(8−)
^{251}Fm	100	151	251.081545(15)	1957	5.30(8) h	β^{+} (98.20%)	^{251}Es	9/2−
^{251}Fm	100	151	251.081545(15)	1957	5.30(8) h	α (1.80%)	^{247}Cf	9/2−
^{251m}Fm	200.0(1) keV			2006	21.8(8) μs	IT	^{251}Fm	5/2+
^{252}Fm	100	152	252.082466(6)	1956	25.39(4) h	α (99.99%) (Note: Theoretically capable of β^{+}β^{+} decay to ^{252}Cf)	^{248}Cf	0+
^{252}Fm	100	152	252.082466(6)	1956	25.39(4) h	SF (0.0023%)	(various)	0+
^{253}Fm	100	153	253.0851809(17)	1957	3.00(12) d	EC (88%)	^{253}Es	1/2+
^{253}Fm	100	153	253.0851809(17)	1957	3.00(12) d	α (12%)	^{249}Cf	1/2+
^{253m}Fm	351(6) keV			2011	0.56(6) μs	IT	^{253}Fm	11/2−#
^{254}Fm	100	154	254.0868524(20)	1954	3.240(2) h	α (99.94%)	^{250}Cf	0+
^{254}Fm	100	154	254.0868524(20)	1954	3.240(2) h	SF (0.0592%)	(various)	0+
^{255}Fm	100	155	255.089963(4)	1954	20.07(7) h	α	^{251}Cf	7/2+
^{255}Fm	100	155	255.089963(4)	1954	20.07(7) h	SF (2.4×10^{−5}%)	(various)	7/2+
^{256}Fm	100	156	256.091772(3)	1955	157.1(13) min	SF (91.9%)	(various)	0+
^{256}Fm	100	156	256.091772(3)	1955	157.1(13) min	α (8.1%)	^{252}Cf	0+
^{257}Fm (Note: Heaviest nuclide produced via neutron capture)	100	157	257.095105(5)	1964	100.5(2) d	α (99.79%)	^{253}Cf	9/2+
^{257}Fm	100	157	257.095105(5)	1964	100.5(2) d	SF (0.210%)	(various)	9/2+
^{258}Fm	100	158	258.09708(22)#	1971	370(14) μs	SF	(various)	0+
^{259}Fm	100	159	259.10060(30)#	1980	1.5(2) s	SF	(various)	
^{260}Fm (Note: Discovery of this isotope is unconfirmed) (Note: Not directly synthesized, occurs as decay product of ^{260}Md)	100	160	260.10281(47)#	(1992)	1# min	SF	(various)	0+
This table header & footer:
