= UNH =

UNH may refer to:

- UnitedHealth Group, a U.S. healthcare company listed on the NYSE
- University of New Hampshire, the U.S. state of New Hampshire's public flagship research university
- University of New Haven, a private university in the U.S. state of Connecticut
- Unnilhexium (Unh), temporary name of chemical element 106, now Seaborgium (Sg)
