= Rutherfordium =

Rutherfordium, _{104}Rf
Rutherfordium
- Pronunciation: /ˌrʌðərˈfɔːrdiəm/ (RUDH-ər-FOR-dee-əm)
- Mass number: [267]

Rutherfordium in the periodic table
Hydrogen																															Helium
Lithium	Beryllium																									Boron	Carbon	Nitrogen	Oxygen	Fluorine	Neon
Sodium	Magnesium																									Aluminium	Silicon	Phosphorus	Sulfur	Chlorine	Argon
Potassium	Calcium															Scandium	Titanium	Vanadium	Chromium	Manganese	Iron	Cobalt	Nickel	Copper	Zinc	Gallium	Germanium	Arsenic	Selenium	Bromine	Krypton
Rubidium	Strontium															Yttrium	Zirconium	Niobium	Molybdenum	Technetium	Ruthenium	Rhodium	Palladium	Silver	Cadmium	Indium	Tin	Antimony	Tellurium	Iodine	Xenon
Caesium	Barium	Lanthanum	Cerium	Praseodymium	Neodymium	Promethium	Samarium	Europium	Gadolinium	Terbium	Dysprosium	Holmium	Erbium	Thulium	Ytterbium	Lutetium	Hafnium	Tantalum	Tungsten	Rhenium	Osmium	Iridium	Platinum	Gold	Mercury (element)	Thallium	Lead	Bismuth	Polonium	Astatine	Radon
Francium	Radium	Actinium	Thorium	Protactinium	Uranium	Neptunium	Plutonium	Americium	Curium	Berkelium	Californium	Einsteinium	Fermium	Mendelevium	Nobelium	Lawrencium	Rutherfordium	Dubnium	Seaborgium	Bohrium	Hassium	Meitnerium	Darmstadtium	Roentgenium	Copernicium	Nihonium	Flerovium	Moscovium	Livermorium	Tennessine	Oganesson
Hf
↑
Rf
↓
—
lawrencium ← rutherfordium → dubnium
- Atomic number (Z): 104
- Group: group 4
- Period: period 7
- Block: d-block
- Electron configuration: [Rn] 5f^{14} 6d^{2} 7s^{2}
- Electrons per shell: 2, 8, 18, 32, 32, 10, 2

Physical properties
- Phase at STP: solid (predicted)
- Melting point: 2400 K (2100 °C, 3800 °F) (predicted)
- Boiling point: 5800 K (5500 °C, 9900 °F) (predicted)
- Density (near r.t.): 17 g/cm^{3} (predicted)

Atomic properties
- Oxidation states: common: +4 (+3), (+4)
- Ionization energies: 1st: 580 kJ/mol; 2nd: 1390 kJ/mol; 3rd: 2300 kJ/mol; (more) (all but first estimated)
- Atomic radius: empirical: 150 pm (estimated)
- Covalent radius: 157 pm (estimated)

Other properties
- Natural occurrence: synthetic
- Crystal structure: hexagonal close-packed (hcp) (predicted)
- CAS Number: 53850-36-5

History
- Naming: after Ernest Rutherford
- Discovery: Joint Institute for Nuclear Research and Lawrence Berkeley National Laboratory (1969)

Isotopes of rutherfordium
Main isotopes			Decay	
Isotope	abundance	half-life (t_{1/2})	mode	product
^{261m}Rf	synth	1.2 min	α	^{257}No
^{263}Rf	synth	15 min	SF	–
^{265}Rf	synth	1.3 min	SF	–
^{267}Rf	synth	48 min	SF	–

Rutherfordium is a synthetic chemical element; it has symbol Rf and atomic number 104. It is named after physicist Ernest Rutherford. As a synthetic element, it is not found in nature and can only be made in a particle accelerator. It is radioactive; the most stable known isotope, ^{267}Rf, has a half-life of about 48 minutes.

In the periodic table, it is a d-block element and the second of the fourth-row transition elements. It is in period 7 and is a group 4 element. Chemistry experiments have confirmed that rutherfordium behaves as the heavier homolog to hafnium in group 4. The chemical properties of rutherfordium are known only partly. They compare well with the other group 4 elements, though some calculations had indicated that the element might show significantly different properties due to relativistic effects.

In the 1960s, small amounts of rutherfordium were produced at Joint Institute for Nuclear Research (JINR) in the Soviet Union and at Lawrence Berkeley National Laboratory in California. Priority of discovery and hence the name of the element was disputed between Soviet and American scientists, and it was not until 1997 that the International Union of Pure and Applied Chemistry (IUPAC) established rutherfordium as the official name of the element.

== Introduction ==
=== Synthesis of superheavy nuclei ===
A graphic depiction of a nuclear fusion reaction. Two nuclei fuse into one, emitting a neutron. Reactions that created new elements to this moment were similar, though varying numbers of neutrons – or alternatively charged particles – may be emitted instead.

A superheavy (Note: In nuclear physics, an element is called heavy if its atomic number is high; lead (element 82) is one example of such a heavy element. The term "superheavy elements" typically refers to elements with atomic number greater than 103 (although there are other definitions, such as atomic number greater than 100 or 112; sometimes, the term is presented an equivalent to the term "transactinide", which puts an upper limit before the beginning of the hypothetical superactinide series). Terms "heavy isotopes" (of a given element) and "heavy nuclei" mean what could be understood in the common language—isotopes of high mass (for the given element) and nuclei of high mass, respectively.) atomic nucleus is created in a nuclear reaction that combines two other nuclei of unequal size (Note: In 2009, a team at the JINR led by Oganessian published results of their attempt to create hassium in a symmetric ^{136}Xe + ^{136}Xe reaction. They failed to observe a single atom in such a reaction, putting the upper limit on the cross section, the measure of probability of a nuclear reaction, as 2.5 pb. In comparison, the reaction that resulted in hassium discovery, ^{208}Pb + ^{58}Fe, had a cross section of ~20 pb (more specifically, 19^{+19}_{-11} pb), as estimated by the discoverers.) into one; roughly, the more unequal the two nuclei in terms of mass, the greater the possibility that the two react. The material made of the heavier nuclei is made into a target, which is then bombarded by the beam of lighter nuclei. Two nuclei can only fuse into one if they are close enough to each other; normally, nuclei (all positively charged) repel each other due to electrostatic repulsion. The strong interaction can overcome this repulsion but only within a very short distance from a nucleus; beam nuclei are thus greatly accelerated in order to make such repulsion insignificant compared to the velocity of the beam nucleus. The energy applied to the beam nuclei to accelerate them can cause them to reach speeds as high as one-tenth of the speed of light. However, if too much energy is applied, the beam nucleus can fall apart.

Coming close enough alone is not enough for two nuclei to fuse: when two nuclei approach each other, they usually remain together for about 10^{−20} seconds and then part ways (not necessarily in the same composition as before the reaction) rather than form a single nucleus. This happens because during the attempted formation of a single nucleus, electrostatic repulsion tears apart the nucleus that is being formed. Each pair of a target and a beam is characterized by its cross section—the probability that fusion will occur if two nuclei approach one another expressed in terms of the transverse area that the incident particle must hit in order for the fusion to occur. (Note: The amount of energy applied to the beam particle to accelerate it can also influence the value of cross section. For example, in the ^{28}_{14}Si + ^{1}_{0}n → ^{28}_{13}Al + ^{1}_{1}p reaction, cross section changes smoothly from 370 mb at 12.3 MeV to 160 mb at 18.3 MeV, with a broad peak at 13.5 MeV with the maximum value of 380 mb.) This fusion may occur as a result of the quantum effect in which nuclei can tunnel through electrostatic repulsion. If the two nuclei can stay close past that phase, multiple nuclear interactions result in redistribution of energy and an energy equilibrium.

External videos
- Visualization of unsuccessful nuclear fusion, based on calculations from the Australian National University

The resulting merger is an excited state—termed a compound nucleus—and thus it is very unstable. To reach a more stable state, the temporary merger may fission without formation of a more stable nucleus. Alternatively, the compound nucleus may eject a few neutrons, which would carry away the excitation energy; if the latter is not sufficient for a neutron expulsion, the merger would produce a gamma ray. This happens in about 10^{−16} seconds after the initial nuclear collision and results in creation of a more stable nucleus. The definition by the IUPAC/IUPAP Joint Working Party (JWP) states that a chemical element can only be recognized as discovered if a nucleus of it exists for at least 10^{−14} seconds. This value was chosen as an estimate of how long it takes a nucleus to acquire electrons and thus display its chemical properties. (Note: This figure also marks the generally accepted upper limit for lifetime of a compound nucleus.)

=== Decay and detection ===
The beam passes through the target and reaches the next chamber, the separator; if a new nucleus is produced, it is carried with this beam. In the separator, the newly produced nucleus is separated from other nuclides (that of the original beam and any other reaction products) (Note: This separation is based on that the resulting nuclei move past the target more slowly then the unreacted beam nuclei. The separator contains electric and magnetic fields whose effects on a moving particle cancel out for a specific velocity of a particle. Such separation can also be aided by a time-of-flight measurement and a recoil energy measurement; a combination of the two may allow to estimate the mass of a nucleus.) and transferred to a surface-barrier detector, which stops the nucleus. The exact location of the upcoming impact on the detector is marked; also marked are its energy and the time of the arrival. The transfer takes about 10^{−6} seconds; in order to be detected, the nucleus must survive this long. The nucleus is recorded again once its decay is registered, and the location, the energy, and the time of the decay are measured.

Stability of a nucleus is provided by the strong interaction. However, its range is very short; as nuclei become larger, its influence on the outermost nucleons (protons and neutrons) weakens. At the same time, the nucleus is torn apart by electrostatic repulsion between protons, and its range is not limited. Total binding energy provided by the strong interaction increases linearly with the number of nucleons, whereas electrostatic repulsion increases with the square of the atomic number, i.e. the latter grows faster and becomes increasingly important for heavy and superheavy nuclei. Superheavy nuclei are thus theoretically predicted and have so far been observed to predominantly decay via decay modes that are caused by such repulsion: alpha decay and spontaneous fission. (Note: Not all decay modes are caused by electrostatic repulsion. For example, beta decay is caused by the weak interaction.) Almost all alpha emitters have over 210 nucleons, and the lightest nuclide primarily undergoing spontaneous fission has 238. In both decay modes, nuclei are inhibited from decaying by corresponding energy barriers for each mode, but they can be tunneled through.

Scheme of an apparatus for creation of superheavy elements, based on the Dubna Gas-Filled Recoil Separator set up in the Flerov Laboratory of Nuclear Reactions in JINR. The trajectory within the detector and the beam focusing apparatus changes because of a dipole magnet in the former and quadrupole magnets in the latter.

Alpha particles are commonly produced in radioactive decays because the mass of an alpha particle per nucleon is small enough to leave some energy for the alpha particle to be used as kinetic energy to leave the nucleus. Spontaneous fission is caused by electrostatic repulsion tearing the nucleus apart and produces various nuclei in different instances of identical nuclei fissioning. As the atomic number increases, spontaneous fission rapidly becomes more important: spontaneous fission partial half-lives decrease by 23 orders of magnitude from uranium (element 92) to nobelium (element 102), and by 30 orders of magnitude from thorium (element 90) to fermium (element 100). The earlier liquid drop model thus suggested that spontaneous fission would occur nearly instantly due to disappearance of the fission barrier for nuclei with about 280 nucleons. The later nuclear shell model suggested that nuclei with about 300 nucleons would form an island of stability in which nuclei will be more resistant to spontaneous fission and will primarily undergo alpha decay with longer half-lives. Subsequent discoveries suggested that the predicted island might be further than originally anticipated; they also showed that nuclei intermediate between the long-lived actinides and the predicted island are deformed, and gain additional stability from shell effects. Experiments on lighter superheavy nuclei, as well as those closer to the expected island, have shown greater than previously anticipated stability against spontaneous fission, showing the importance of shell effects on nuclei. (Note: It was already known by the 1960s that ground states of nuclei differed in energy and shape as well as that certain magic numbers of nucleons corresponded to greater stability of a nucleus. However, it was assumed that there was no nuclear structure in superheavy nuclei as they were too deformed to form one.)

Alpha decays are registered by the emitted alpha particles, and the decay products are easy to determine before the actual decay; if such a decay or a series of consecutive decays produces a known nucleus, the original product of a reaction can be easily determined. (Note: Since mass of a nucleus is not measured directly but is rather calculated from that of another nucleus, such measurement is called indirect. Direct measurements are also possible, but for the most part they have remained unavailable for superheavy nuclei. The first direct measurement of mass of a superheavy nucleus was reported in 2018 at LBNL. Mass was determined from the location of a nucleus after the transfer (the location helps determine its trajectory, which is linked to the mass-to-charge ratio of the nucleus, since the transfer was done in presence of a magnet).) (That all decays within a decay chain were indeed related to each other is established by the location of these decays, which must be in the same place.) The known nucleus can be recognized by the specific characteristics of decay it undergoes such as decay energy (or more specifically, the kinetic energy of the emitted particle). (Note: If the decay occurred in a vacuum, then since total momentum of an isolated system before and after the decay must be preserved, the daughter nucleus would also receive a small velocity. The ratio of the two velocities, and accordingly the ratio of the kinetic energies, would thus be inverse to the ratio of the two masses. The decay energy equals the sum of the known kinetic energy of the alpha particle and that of the daughter nucleus (an exact fraction of the former). The calculations hold for an experiment as well, but the difference is that the nucleus does not move after the decay because it is tied to the detector.) Spontaneous fission, however, produces various nuclei as products, so the original nuclide cannot be determined from its daughters. (Note: Spontaneous fission was discovered by Soviet physicist Georgy Flerov, a leading scientist at JINR, and thus it was a "hobbyhorse" for the facility. In contrast, the LBL scientists believed fission information was not sufficient for a claim of synthesis of an element. They believed spontaneous fission had not been studied enough to use it for identification of a new element, since there was a difficulty of establishing that a compound nucleus had only ejected neutrons and not charged particles like protons or alpha particles. They thus preferred to link new isotopes to the already known ones by successive alpha decays.)

The information available to physicists aiming to synthesize a superheavy element is thus the information collected at the detectors: location, energy, and time of arrival of a particle to the detector, and those of its decay. The physicists analyze this data and seek to conclude that it was indeed caused by a new element and could not have been caused by a different nuclide than the one claimed. Often, provided data is insufficient for a conclusion that a new element was definitely created and there is no other explanation for the observed effects; errors in interpreting data have been made. (Note: For instance, element 102 was mistakenly identified in 1957 at the Nobel Institute of Physics in Stockholm, Stockholm County, Sweden. There were no earlier definitive claims of creation of this element, and the element was assigned a name by its Swedish, American, and British discoverers, nobelium. It was later shown that the identification was incorrect. The following year, RL was unable to reproduce the Swedish results and announced instead their synthesis of the element; that claim was also disproved later. JINR insisted that they were the first to create the element and suggested a name of their own for the new element, joliotium; the Soviet name was also not accepted (JINR later referred to the naming of the element 102 as "hasty"). This name was proposed to IUPAC in a written response to their ruling on priority of discovery claims of elements, signed 29 September 1992. The name "nobelium" remained unchanged on account of its widespread usage.)

== History ==
=== Discovery ===
Rutherfordium was reportedly first detected in 1964 at JINR at Dubna (Soviet Union at the time). Researchers there bombarded a ^{242}Pu target with ^{22}Ne ions; a spontaneous fission activity with half-life 0.3 ± 0.1 second was detected and assigned to ^{260}Rf. Later work found no isotope of element 104 with this half-life, so that this assignment must be considered incorrect.

In 1966–1969, the experiment was repeated. This time, the reaction products by gradient thermochromatography after conversion to chlorides by interaction with ZrCl_{4}. The team identified spontaneous fission activity contained within a volatile chloride portraying eka-hafnium properties.

^{242}_{94}Pu + ^{22}_{10}Ne → ^{264−x}_{104}Rf → ^{264−x}_{104}RfCl_{4}

The researchers considered the results to support the 0.3 second half-life. Although it is now known that there is no isotope of element 104 with such a half-life, the chemistry does fit that of element 104, as chloride volatility is much greater in group 4 than in group 3 (or the actinides).

In 1969, researchers at University of California, Berkeley conclusively synthesized the element by bombarding a ^{249}Cf target with ^{12}C ions and measured the alpha decay of ^{257}Rf, correlated with the daughter decay of ^{253}No:

^{249}_{98}Cf + ^{12}_{6}C → ^{261}_{104}Rf* → ^{257}_{104}Rf + 4 ^{1}_{0}n

They were unable to confirm the 0.3-second half-life for ^{260}Rf, and instead found a 10–30 millisecond half-life for this isotope, agreeing with the modern value of 21 ms. In 1970, the American team chemically identified element 104 using the ion-exchange separation method, proving it to be a group 4 element and the heavier homologue of hafnium.

The American synthesis was independently confirmed in 1973 and secured the identification of rutherfordium as the parent by the observation of K-alpha X-rays in the elemental signature of the ^{257}Rf decay product, ^{253}No.

=== Naming controversy ===
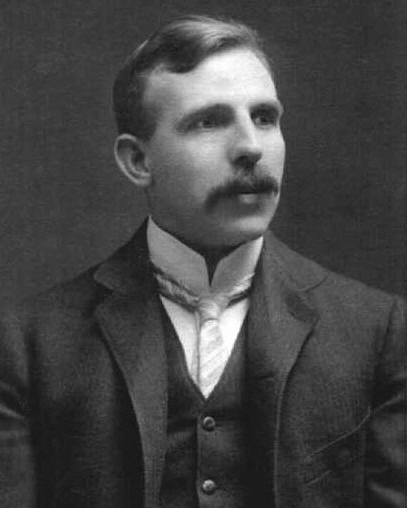
Element 104 was eventually named after Ernest Rutherford

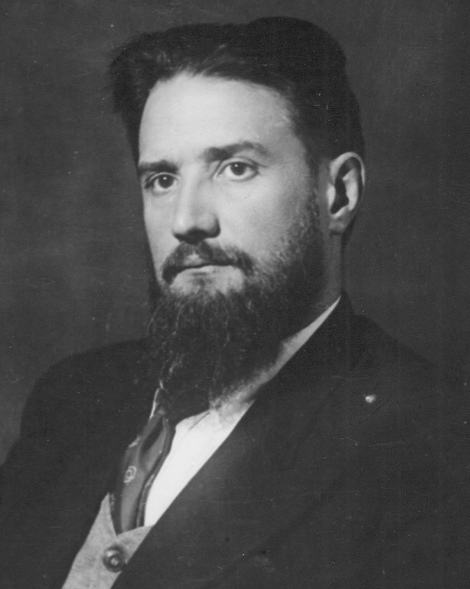
Igor Kurchatov

As a consequence of the initial competing claims of discovery, an element naming controversy arose. Since the Soviets claimed to have first detected the new element they suggested the name kurchatovium (Ku) in honor of Igor Kurchatov (1903–1960), former head of Soviet nuclear research. This name had been used in books of the Soviet Bloc as the official name of the element. The Americans, however, proposed rutherfordium (Rf) for the new element to honor New Zealand physicist Ernest Rutherford, who is known as the "father" of nuclear physics. In 1992, the IUPAC/IUPAP Transfermium Working Group (TWG) assessed the claims of discovery and concluded that both teams provided contemporaneous evidence to the synthesis of element 104 in 1969, and that credit should be shared between the two groups. In particular, this involved the TWG performing a new retrospective reanalysis of the Russian work in the face of the later-discovered fact that there is no 0.3-second isotope of element 104: they reinterpreted the Dubna results as having been caused by a spontaneous fission branch of ^{259}Rf.

The American group wrote a scathing response to the findings of the TWG, stating that they had given too much emphasis on the results from the Dubna group. In particular they pointed out that the Russian group had altered the details of their claims several times over a period of 20 years, a fact that the Russian team does not deny. They also stressed that the TWG had given too much credence to the chemistry experiments performed by the Russians, considered the TWG's retrospective treatment of the Russian work based on unpublished documents to have been "highly irregular", noted that there was no proof that ^{259}Rf had a spontaneous fission branch at all (as of 2021 there still is not), and accused the TWG of not having appropriately qualified personnel on the committee. The TWG responded by saying that this was not the case and having assessed each point raised by the American group said that they found no reason to alter their conclusion regarding priority of discovery.

The International Union of Pure and Applied Chemistry (IUPAC) adopted unnilquadium (Unq) as a temporary, systematic element name, derived from the Latin names for digits 1, 0, and 4. In 1994, IUPAC suggested a set of names for elements 104 through 109, in which dubnium (Db) became element 104 and rutherfordium became element 106. This recommendation was criticized by the American scientists for several reasons. Firstly, their suggestions were scrambled: the names rutherfordium and hahnium, originally suggested by Berkeley for elements 104 and 105, were respectively reassigned to elements 106 and 108. Secondly, elements 104 and 105 were given names favored by JINR, despite earlier recognition of LBL as an equal co-discoverer for both of them. Thirdly and most importantly, IUPAC rejected the name seaborgium for element 106, having just approved a rule that an element could not be named after a living person, even though the IUPAC had given the LBNL team the sole credit for its discovery. In 1997, IUPAC renamed elements 104 to 109, and gave elements 104 and 106 the Berkeley proposals rutherfordium and seaborgium. The name dubnium was given to element 105 at the same time. The 1997 names were accepted by researchers and became the standard.

== Isotopes ==
Rutherfordium has no stable or naturally occurring isotopes. Several radioisotopes have been synthesized in the laboratory, either by fusing two atoms or from the decay of heavier elements. Seventeen different isotopes have been reported with mass numbers 252–270 (except 264 and 269). These decay predominantly through spontaneous fission, especially isotopes with even neutron numbers, while some of the lighter isotopes with odd neutron numbers also have significant alpha decay branches.

=== Stability and half-lives ===
Of isotopes whose half-lives are known, the lighter isotopes usually have shorter half-lives. The three lightest known isotopes have half-lives of <50 μs; the lightest reported isotope ^{252}Rf has a half-life of <1 μs. ^{256}Rf, ^{258}Rf, ^{260}Rf are more stable at ~10 ms; ^{255}Rf, ^{257}Rf, ^{259}Rf, and ^{262}Rf live between 1 and 5 seconds; ^{261}Rf, ^{265}Rf, and ^{263}Rf are more stable, at ~1.1, 1.5, and 10 minutes respectively. The most stable known isotope, ^{267}Rf, is one of the heaviest, and has a half-life of about 48 minutes. Rutherfordium isotopes with an odd neutron number tend to have longer half-lives than their even–even neighbors because the odd neutron hinders spontaneous fission.

The lightest isotopes were synthesized by direct fusion between two lighter nuclei and as decay products. The heaviest isotope produced by direct fusion is ^{262}Rf; heavier isotopes have only been observed as decay products of elements with larger atomic numbers. The heavy isotopes ^{266}Rf and ^{268}Rf have also been reported as electron capture daughters of the dubnium (^{266}Db and ^{268}Db), but have short half-lives to spontaneous fission. It seems likely that the same is true for ^{270}Rf, a possible daughter of ^{270}Db. These three isotopes remain unconfirmed.

In 1999, American scientists at University of California, Berkeley, announced that they had succeeded in synthesizing three atoms of ^{293}Og. These parent nuclei were reported to have successively emitted seven alpha particles to form ^{265}Rf, but their claim was retracted in 2001. This isotope was later discovered in 2010 as the final product in the decay chain of ^{285}Fl.

== Predicted properties ==
Very few properties of rutherfordium or its compounds have been measured; this is due to its extremely limited and expensive production and the fact that rutherfordium (and its parents) decays very quickly. A few singular chemistry-related properties have been measured, but properties of rutherfordium metal remain unknown and only predictions are available.

=== Chemical ===
Rutherfordium is the first transactinide element and the second member of the 6d series of transition metals. Calculations on its ionization potentials, atomic radius, as well as radii, orbital energies, and ground levels of its ionized states are similar to that of hafnium and very different from that of lead. Therefore, it was concluded that rutherfordium's basic properties will resemble those of other group 4 elements: titanium, zirconium, and hafnium. Some of its properties were determined by gas-phase experiments and aqueous chemistry. The oxidation state +4 is the only stable state for the latter two elements, so rutherfordium should also exhibit a stable +4 state. Rutherfordium is also expected to be able to form a less stable +3 state. The standard reduction potential of the Rf^{4+}/Rf couple is predicted to be higher than −1.7 V.

Initial predictions of the chemical properties of rutherfordium were based on calculations which indicated that the relativistic effects on the electron shell might be strong enough that the 7p orbitals would have a lower energy level than the 6d orbitals, giving it a valence electron configuration of 6d^{1} 7s^{2} 7p^{1} or even 7s^{2} 7p^{2}, making the element behave more like lead than hafnium. With better calculation methods and experimental studies of the chemical properties of rutherfordium compounds, it could be shown that this does not happen and that rutherfordium instead behaves like the other group 4 elements. Later it was shown in ab initio calculations with the high level of accuracy that the Rf atom has the ground state with the 6d^{2} 7s^{2} valence configuration and the low-lying excited 6d^{1} 7s^{2} 7p^{1} state with the excitation energy of only 0.3–0.5 eV.

In an analogous manner to zirconium and hafnium, rutherfordium is projected to form a very stable, refractory oxide, RfO_{2}. It reacts with halogens to form tetrahalides, RfX_{4}, which hydrolyze on contact with water to form oxyhalides RfOX_{2}. The tetrahalides are volatile solids existing as monomeric tetrahedral molecules in the vapor phase.

In the aqueous phase, the Rf^{4+} ion hydrolyzes less than titanium(IV) and to a similar extent as zirconium and hafnium, resulting in the RfO^{2+} ion. Treatment of the halides with halide ions promotes the formation of complex ions. The use of chloride and bromide ions produces the hexahalide complexes RfCl^{2−}_{6} and RfBr^{2−}_{6}. For the fluoride complexes, zirconium and hafnium tend to form hepta- and octa- complexes. Thus, for the larger rutherfordium ion, the complexes RfF^{2−}_{6}, RfF^{3−}_{7} and RfF^{4−}_{8} are possible.

=== Physical and atomic ===
Rutherfordium is expected to be a solid under normal conditions and have a hexagonal close-packed crystal structure (^{c}/_{a} = 1.61), similar to its lighter congener hafnium. It should be a metal with density ~17 g/cm^{3}. The atomic radius of rutherfordium is expected to be ~150 pm. Due to relativistic stabilization of the 7s orbital and destabilization of the 6d orbital, Rf^{+} and Rf^{2+} ions are predicted to give up 6d electrons instead of 7s electrons, which is the opposite of the behavior of its lighter homologs. When under high pressure (variously calculated as 72 or ~50 GPa), rutherfordium is expected to transition to body-centered cubic crystal structure; hafnium transforms to this structure at 71±1 GPa, but has an intermediate ω structure that it transforms to at 38±8 GPa that should be lacking for rutherfordium.

== Experimental chemistry ==
=== Gas phase ===
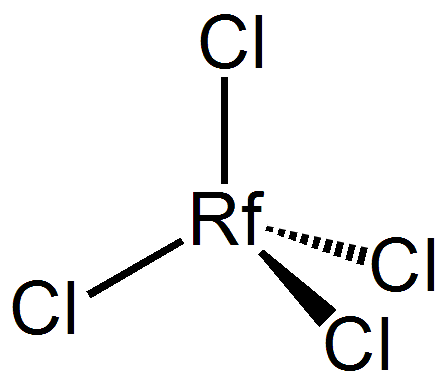
The tetrahedral structure of the RfCl_{4} molecule

Early work on the study of the chemistry of rutherfordium focused on gas thermochromatography and measurement of relative deposition temperature adsorption curves. The initial work was carried out at Dubna in an attempt to reaffirm their discovery of the element. Recent work is more reliable regarding the identification of the parent rutherfordium radioisotopes. The isotope ^{261m}Rf has been used for these studies, though the long-lived ^{267}Rf (produced in the decay chain of ^{291}Lv, ^{287}Fl, and ^{283}Cn) may be advantageous for future experiments. The experiments relied on the expectation that rutherfordium would be a 6d element in group 4 and should therefore form a volatile molecular tetrachloride, that would be tetrahedral in shape. Rutherfordium(IV) chloride is more volatile than its lighter homologue hafnium(IV) chloride (HfCl_{4}) because its bonds are more covalent.

A series of experiments confirmed that rutherfordium behaves as a typical member of group 4, forming a tetravalent chloride (RfCl_{4}) and bromide (RfBr_{4}) as well as an oxychloride (RfOCl_{2}). A decreased volatility was observed for RfCl_{4} when potassium chloride is provided as the solid phase instead of gas, highly indicative of the formation of nonvolatile K_{2}RfCl_{6} mixed salt.

=== Aqueous phase ===
Rutherfordium is expected to have the electron configuration [Rn]5f^{14} 6d^{2} 7s^{2} and therefore behave as the heavier homolog of hafnium in group 4 of the periodic table. It should therefore readily form a hydrated Rf^{4+} ion in strong acid solution and should readily form complexes in hydrochloric acid, hydrobromic or hydrofluoric acid solutions.

The most conclusive aqueous chemistry studies of rutherfordium have been performed by the Japanese team at Japan Atomic Energy Research Institute using the isotope ^{261m}Rf. Extraction experiments from hydrochloric acid solutions using isotopes of rutherfordium, hafnium, zirconium, as well as the pseudo-group 4 element thorium have proved a non-actinide behavior for rutherfordium. A comparison with its lighter homologs placed rutherfordium firmly in group 4 and indicated the formation of a hexachlororutherfordate complex in chloride solutions, in a manner similar to hafnium and zirconium.

^{261m}Rf^{4+} + 6 Cl^{−} → [^{261m}RfCl_{6}]^{2−}

Very similar results were observed in hydrofluoric acid solutions. Differences in the extraction curves were interpreted as a weaker affinity for fluoride ion and the formation of the hexafluororutherfordate ion, whereas hafnium and zirconium ions complex seven or eight fluoride ions at the concentrations used:

^{261m}Rf^{4+} + 6 F^{−} → [^{261m}RfF_{6}]^{2−}

Experiments performed in mixed sulfuric and nitric acid solutions shows that rutherfordium has a much weaker affinity toward forming sulfate complexes than hafnium. This result is in agreement with predictions, which expect rutherfordium complexes to be less stable than those of zirconium and hafnium because of a smaller ionic contribution to the bonding. This arises because rutherfordium has a larger ionic radius (76 pm) than zirconium (71 pm) and hafnium (72 pm), and also because of relativistic stabilisation of the 7s orbital and destabilisation and spin–orbit splitting of the 6d orbitals.

Coprecipitation experiments performed in 2021 studied rutherfordium's behaviour in basic solution containing ammonia or sodium hydroxide, using zirconium, hafnium, and thorium as comparisons. It was found that rutherfordium does not strongly coordinate with ammonia and instead coprecipitates out as a hydroxide, which is probably Rf(OH)_{4}.

== Bibliography ==
- Audi, G.; Kondev, F. G.; Wang, M.; et al. (2017). "The NUBASE2016 evaluation of nuclear properties". Chinese Physics C. 41 (3) 030001. Bibcode:2017ChPhC..41c0001A. doi:10.1088/1674-1137/41/3/030001.
- Beiser, A. (2003). Concepts of modern physics (6th ed.). McGraw-Hill. ISBN 978-0-07-244848-1. OCLC 48965418.
- Hoffman, D. C.; Ghiorso, A.; Seaborg, G. T. (2000). The Transuranium People: The Inside Story. World Scientific. ISBN 978-1-78-326244-1.
- Kragh, H. (2018). From Transuranic to Superheavy Elements: A Story of Dispute and Creation. Springer. ISBN 978-3-319-75813-8.
- Zagrebaev, V.; Karpov, A.; Greiner, W. (2013). "Future of superheavy element research: Which nuclei could be synthesized within the next few years?". Journal of Physics: Conference Series. 420 (1) 012001. arXiv:1207.5700. Bibcode:2013JPhCS.420a2001Z. doi:10.1088/1742-6596/420/1/012001. ISSN 1742-6588. S2CID 55434734.
