= Seaborgium =

Seaborgium, _{106}Sg
Seaborgium
- Pronunciation: /siːˈbɔːrɡiəm/ (see-BOR-ghee-əm)
- Mass number: [267] (data not decisive) (Note: The most stable isotope of seaborgium cannot be determined based on existing data due to uncertainty that arises from the low number of measurements. The half-life of ^{267}Sg corresponding to one standard deviation is, based on existing data, 9.8+11.3 −4.5 minutes, whereas that of ^{269}Sg is 5±2 minutes; these measurements have overlapping confidence intervals.)

Seaborgium in the periodic table
Hydrogen																															Helium
Lithium	Beryllium																									Boron	Carbon	Nitrogen	Oxygen	Fluorine	Neon
Sodium	Magnesium																									Aluminium	Silicon	Phosphorus	Sulfur	Chlorine	Argon
Potassium	Calcium															Scandium	Titanium	Vanadium	Chromium	Manganese	Iron	Cobalt	Nickel	Copper	Zinc	Gallium	Germanium	Arsenic	Selenium	Bromine	Krypton
Rubidium	Strontium															Yttrium	Zirconium	Niobium	Molybdenum	Technetium	Ruthenium	Rhodium	Palladium	Silver	Cadmium	Indium	Tin	Antimony	Tellurium	Iodine	Xenon
Caesium	Barium	Lanthanum	Cerium	Praseodymium	Neodymium	Promethium	Samarium	Europium	Gadolinium	Terbium	Dysprosium	Holmium	Erbium	Thulium	Ytterbium	Lutetium	Hafnium	Tantalum	Tungsten	Rhenium	Osmium	Iridium	Platinum	Gold	Mercury (element)	Thallium	Lead	Bismuth	Polonium	Astatine	Radon
Francium	Radium	Actinium	Thorium	Protactinium	Uranium	Neptunium	Plutonium	Americium	Curium	Berkelium	Californium	Einsteinium	Fermium	Mendelevium	Nobelium	Lawrencium	Rutherfordium	Dubnium	Seaborgium	Bohrium	Hassium	Meitnerium	Darmstadtium	Roentgenium	Copernicium	Nihonium	Flerovium	Moscovium	Livermorium	Tennessine	Oganesson
W
↑
Sg
↓
—
dubnium ← seaborgium → bohrium
- Atomic number (Z): 106
- Group: group 6
- Period: period 7
- Block: d-block
- Electron configuration: [Rn] 5f^{14} 6d^{4} 7s^{2}
- Electrons per shell: 2, 8, 18, 32, 32, 12, 2

Physical properties
- Phase at STP: solid (predicted)
- Density (near r.t.): 23–24 g/cm^{3} (predicted)

Atomic properties
- Oxidation states: common: (none); 0, +6 (+3), (+4), (+5), (+6)
- Ionization energies: 1st: 757 kJ/mol; 2nd: 1733 kJ/mol; 3rd: 2484 kJ/mol; (more) (all but first estimated)
- Atomic radius: empirical: 132 pm (predicted)
- Covalent radius: 143 pm (estimated)

Other properties
- Natural occurrence: synthetic
- Crystal structure: body-centered cubic (bcc) (predicted)
- CAS Number: 54038-81-2

History
- Naming: after Glenn T. Seaborg
- Discovery: Lawrence Berkeley National Laboratory (1974)

Isotopes of seaborgium
Main isotopes			Decay	
Isotope	abundance	half-life (t_{1/2})	mode	product
^{265}Sg	synth	8.5 s	α	^{261}Rf
^{265m}Sg	synth	14.4 s	α	^{261m}Rf
^{267}Sg	synth	9.8 min	α	^{263m}Rf
^{267m}Sg	synth	100 s	SF	
^{268}Sg	synth	13 s	SF	
^{269}Sg	synth	13 min	α 87%	^{265}Rf
^{269}Sg	synth	13 min	SF 13%	
^{271}Sg	synth	31 s	α73%	^{267}Rf
^{271}Sg	synth	31 s	SF27%	

Seaborgium is a synthetic chemical element; it has symbol Sg and atomic number 106. It is named after the American nuclear chemist Glenn T. Seaborg. As a synthetic element, it can be created in a laboratory but is not found in nature. It is also radioactive; the most stable known isotopes have half-lives on the order of several minutes.

In the periodic table of the elements, it is a d-block transactinide element. It is a member of the 7th period and belongs to the group 6 elements as the fourth member of the 6d series of transition metals. Very few chemical reactions of seaborgium have been studied: only a few atoms at a time can be produced and these decay quickly. A few inorganic compounds and a carbonyl believed to be Sg(CO)_{6} have been synthesized. These experiments have confirmed that seaborgium behaves as the heavier homologue to tungsten in group 6.

In 1974, a few atoms of seaborgium were produced in laboratories in the Soviet Union and in the United States. The priority of the discovery and therefore the naming of the element was disputed between Soviet and American scientists, and it was not until 1997 that the International Union of Pure and Applied Chemistry (IUPAC) established seaborgium as the official name for the element. It is one of only two elements named after a living person at the time of naming, the other being oganesson, element 118. (Note: The names einsteinium and fermium for elements 99 and 100 were proposed when their namesakes (Albert Einstein and Enrico Fermi respectively) were still alive, but were not made official until Einstein and Fermi had died.)

== Introduction ==
=== Synthesis of superheavy nuclei ===
A graphic depiction of a nuclear fusion reaction. Two nuclei fuse into one, emitting a neutron. Reactions that created new elements to this moment were similar, though varying numbers of neutrons – or alternatively charged particles – may be emitted instead.

A superheavy (Note: In nuclear physics, an element is called heavy if its atomic number is high; lead (element 82) is one example of such a heavy element. The term "superheavy elements" typically refers to elements with atomic number greater than 103 (although there are other definitions, such as atomic number greater than 100 or 112; sometimes, the term is presented an equivalent to the term "transactinide", which puts an upper limit before the beginning of the hypothetical superactinide series). Terms "heavy isotopes" (of a given element) and "heavy nuclei" mean what could be understood in the common language—isotopes of high mass (for the given element) and nuclei of high mass, respectively.) atomic nucleus is created in a nuclear reaction that combines two other nuclei of unequal size (Note: In 2009, a team at the JINR led by Oganessian published results of their attempt to create hassium in a symmetric ^{136}Xe + ^{136}Xe reaction. They failed to observe a single atom in such a reaction, putting the upper limit on the cross section, the measure of probability of a nuclear reaction, as 2.5 pb. In comparison, the reaction that resulted in hassium discovery, ^{208}Pb + ^{58}Fe, had a cross section of ~20 pb (more specifically, 19^{+19}_{-11} pb), as estimated by the discoverers.) into one; roughly, the more unequal the two nuclei in terms of mass, the greater the possibility that the two react. The material made of the heavier nuclei is made into a target, which is then bombarded by the beam of lighter nuclei. Two nuclei can only fuse into one if they are close enough to each other; normally, nuclei (all positively charged) repel each other due to electrostatic repulsion. The strong interaction can overcome this repulsion but only within a very short distance from a nucleus; beam nuclei are thus greatly accelerated in order to make such repulsion insignificant compared to the velocity of the beam nucleus. The energy applied to the beam nuclei to accelerate them can cause them to reach speeds as high as one-tenth of the speed of light. However, if too much energy is applied, the beam nucleus can fall apart.

Coming close enough alone is not enough for two nuclei to fuse: when two nuclei approach each other, they usually remain together for about 10^{−20} seconds and then part ways (not necessarily in the same composition as before the reaction) rather than form a single nucleus. This happens because during the attempted formation of a single nucleus, electrostatic repulsion tears apart the nucleus that is being formed. Each pair of a target and a beam is characterized by its cross section—the probability that fusion will occur if two nuclei approach one another expressed in terms of the transverse area that the incident particle must hit in order for the fusion to occur. (Note: The amount of energy applied to the beam particle to accelerate it can also influence the value of cross section. For example, in the ^{28}_{14}Si + ^{1}_{0}n → ^{28}_{13}Al + ^{1}_{1}p reaction, cross section changes smoothly from 370 mb at 12.3 MeV to 160 mb at 18.3 MeV, with a broad peak at 13.5 MeV with the maximum value of 380 mb.) This fusion may occur as a result of the quantum effect in which nuclei can tunnel through electrostatic repulsion. If the two nuclei can stay close past that phase, multiple nuclear interactions result in redistribution of energy and an energy equilibrium.

External videos
- Visualization of unsuccessful nuclear fusion, based on calculations from the Australian National University

The resulting merger is an excited state—termed a compound nucleus—and thus it is very unstable. To reach a more stable state, the temporary merger may fission without formation of a more stable nucleus. Alternatively, the compound nucleus may eject a few neutrons, which would carry away the excitation energy; if the latter is not sufficient for a neutron expulsion, the merger would produce a gamma ray. This happens in about 10^{−16} seconds after the initial nuclear collision and results in creation of a more stable nucleus. The definition by the IUPAC/IUPAP Joint Working Party (JWP) states that a chemical element can only be recognized as discovered if a nucleus of it exists for at least 10^{−14} seconds. This value was chosen as an estimate of how long it takes a nucleus to acquire electrons and thus display its chemical properties. (Note: This figure also marks the generally accepted upper limit for lifetime of a compound nucleus.)

=== Decay and detection ===
The beam passes through the target and reaches the next chamber, the separator; if a new nucleus is produced, it is carried with this beam. In the separator, the newly produced nucleus is separated from other nuclides (that of the original beam and any other reaction products) (Note: This separation is based on that the resulting nuclei move past the target more slowly then the unreacted beam nuclei. The separator contains electric and magnetic fields whose effects on a moving particle cancel out for a specific velocity of a particle. Such separation can also be aided by a time-of-flight measurement and a recoil energy measurement; a combination of the two may allow to estimate the mass of a nucleus.) and transferred to a surface-barrier detector, which stops the nucleus. The exact location of the upcoming impact on the detector is marked; also marked are its energy and the time of the arrival. The transfer takes about 10^{−6} seconds; in order to be detected, the nucleus must survive this long. The nucleus is recorded again once its decay is registered, and the location, the energy, and the time of the decay are measured.

Stability of a nucleus is provided by the strong interaction. However, its range is very short; as nuclei become larger, its influence on the outermost nucleons (protons and neutrons) weakens. At the same time, the nucleus is torn apart by electrostatic repulsion between protons, and its range is not limited. Total binding energy provided by the strong interaction increases linearly with the number of nucleons, whereas electrostatic repulsion increases with the square of the atomic number, i.e. the latter grows faster and becomes increasingly important for heavy and superheavy nuclei. Superheavy nuclei are thus theoretically predicted and have so far been observed to predominantly decay via decay modes that are caused by such repulsion: alpha decay and spontaneous fission. (Note: Not all decay modes are caused by electrostatic repulsion. For example, beta decay is caused by the weak interaction.) Almost all alpha emitters have over 210 nucleons, and the lightest nuclide primarily undergoing spontaneous fission has 238. In both decay modes, nuclei are inhibited from decaying by corresponding energy barriers for each mode, but they can be tunneled through.

Scheme of an apparatus for creation of superheavy elements, based on the Dubna Gas-Filled Recoil Separator set up in the Flerov Laboratory of Nuclear Reactions in JINR. The trajectory within the detector and the beam focusing apparatus changes because of a dipole magnet in the former and quadrupole magnets in the latter.

Alpha particles are commonly produced in radioactive decays because the mass of an alpha particle per nucleon is small enough to leave some energy for the alpha particle to be used as kinetic energy to leave the nucleus. Spontaneous fission is caused by electrostatic repulsion tearing the nucleus apart and produces various nuclei in different instances of identical nuclei fissioning. As the atomic number increases, spontaneous fission rapidly becomes more important: spontaneous fission partial half-lives decrease by 23 orders of magnitude from uranium (element 92) to nobelium (element 102), and by 30 orders of magnitude from thorium (element 90) to fermium (element 100). The earlier liquid drop model thus suggested that spontaneous fission would occur nearly instantly due to disappearance of the fission barrier for nuclei with about 280 nucleons. The later nuclear shell model suggested that nuclei with about 300 nucleons would form an island of stability in which nuclei will be more resistant to spontaneous fission and will primarily undergo alpha decay with longer half-lives. Subsequent discoveries suggested that the predicted island might be further than originally anticipated; they also showed that nuclei intermediate between the long-lived actinides and the predicted island are deformed, and gain additional stability from shell effects. Experiments on lighter superheavy nuclei, as well as those closer to the expected island, have shown greater than previously anticipated stability against spontaneous fission, showing the importance of shell effects on nuclei. (Note: It was already known by the 1960s that ground states of nuclei differed in energy and shape as well as that certain magic numbers of nucleons corresponded to greater stability of a nucleus. However, it was assumed that there was no nuclear structure in superheavy nuclei as they were too deformed to form one.)

Alpha decays are registered by the emitted alpha particles, and the decay products are easy to determine before the actual decay; if such a decay or a series of consecutive decays produces a known nucleus, the original product of a reaction can be easily determined. (Note: Since mass of a nucleus is not measured directly but is rather calculated from that of another nucleus, such measurement is called indirect. Direct measurements are also possible, but for the most part they have remained unavailable for superheavy nuclei. The first direct measurement of mass of a superheavy nucleus was reported in 2018 at LBNL. Mass was determined from the location of a nucleus after the transfer (the location helps determine its trajectory, which is linked to the mass-to-charge ratio of the nucleus, since the transfer was done in presence of a magnet).) (That all decays within a decay chain were indeed related to each other is established by the location of these decays, which must be in the same place.) The known nucleus can be recognized by the specific characteristics of decay it undergoes such as decay energy (or more specifically, the kinetic energy of the emitted particle). (Note: If the decay occurred in a vacuum, then since total momentum of an isolated system before and after the decay must be preserved, the daughter nucleus would also receive a small velocity. The ratio of the two velocities, and accordingly the ratio of the kinetic energies, would thus be inverse to the ratio of the two masses. The decay energy equals the sum of the known kinetic energy of the alpha particle and that of the daughter nucleus (an exact fraction of the former). The calculations hold for an experiment as well, but the difference is that the nucleus does not move after the decay because it is tied to the detector.) Spontaneous fission, however, produces various nuclei as products, so the original nuclide cannot be determined from its daughters. (Note: Spontaneous fission was discovered by Soviet physicist Georgy Flerov, a leading scientist at JINR, and thus it was a "hobbyhorse" for the facility. In contrast, the LBL scientists believed fission information was not sufficient for a claim of synthesis of an element. They believed spontaneous fission had not been studied enough to use it for identification of a new element, since there was a difficulty of establishing that a compound nucleus had only ejected neutrons and not charged particles like protons or alpha particles. They thus preferred to link new isotopes to the already known ones by successive alpha decays.)

The information available to physicists aiming to synthesize a superheavy element is thus the information collected at the detectors: location, energy, and time of arrival of a particle to the detector, and those of its decay. The physicists analyze this data and seek to conclude that it was indeed caused by a new element and could not have been caused by a different nuclide than the one claimed. Often, provided data is insufficient for a conclusion that a new element was definitely created and there is no other explanation for the observed effects; errors in interpreting data have been made. (Note: For instance, element 102 was mistakenly identified in 1957 at the Nobel Institute of Physics in Stockholm, Stockholm County, Sweden. There were no earlier definitive claims of creation of this element, and the element was assigned a name by its Swedish, American, and British discoverers, nobelium. It was later shown that the identification was incorrect. The following year, RL was unable to reproduce the Swedish results and announced instead their synthesis of the element; that claim was also disproved later. JINR insisted that they were the first to create the element and suggested a name of their own for the new element, joliotium; the Soviet name was also not accepted (JINR later referred to the naming of the element 102 as "hasty"). This name was proposed to IUPAC in a written response to their ruling on priority of discovery claims of elements, signed 29 September 1992. The name "nobelium" remained unchanged on account of its widespread usage.)

== History ==
Following claims of the observation of elements 104 and 105 in 1970 by Albert Ghiorso et al. at the Lawrence Livermore National Laboratory, a search for element 106 using oxygen-18 projectiles and the previously used californium-249 target was conducted. Several 9.1 MeV alpha decays were reported and are now thought to originate from element 106, though this was not confirmed at the time. In 1972, the HILAC accelerator received equipment upgrades, preventing the team from repeating the experiment, and data analysis was not done during the shutdown. This reaction was tried again several years later, in 1974, and the Berkeley team realized that their new data agreed with their 1971 data, to the astonishment of Ghiorso. Hence, element 106 could have actually been discovered in 1971 if the original data was analyzed more carefully.

Two groups claimed discovery of the element. Evidence of element 106 was first reported in 1974 by a Russian research team in Dubna led by Yuri Oganessian, in which targets of lead-208 and lead-207 were bombarded with accelerated ions of chromium-54. In total, fifty-one spontaneous fission events were observed with a half-life between four and ten milliseconds. After having ruled out nucleon transfer reactions as a cause for these activities, the team concluded that the most likely cause of the activities was the spontaneous fission of isotopes of element 106. The isotope in question was first suggested to be seaborgium-259, but was later corrected to seaborgium-260.

^{208}_{82}Pb + ^{54}_{24}Cr → ^{260}_{106}Sg + 2 n
^{207}_{82}Pb + ^{54}_{24}Cr → ^{260}_{106}Sg + n

A few months later in 1974, researchers including Glenn T. Seaborg, Carol Alonso and Albert Ghiorso at the University of California, Berkeley, and E. Kenneth Hulet from the Lawrence Livermore National Laboratory, also synthesized the element by bombarding a californium-249 target with oxygen-18 ions, using equipment similar to that which had been used for the synthesis of element 104 five years earlier, observing at least seventy alpha decays, seemingly from the isotope seaborgium-263m with a half-life of 0.9±0.2 seconds. The alpha daughter rutherfordium-259 and granddaughter nobelium-255 had previously been synthesised and the properties observed here matched with those previously known, as did the intensity of their production. The cross-section of the reaction observed, 0.3 nanobarns, also agreed well with theoretical predictions. These bolstered the assignment of the alpha decay events to seaborgium-263m.

^{249}_{98}Cf + ^{18}_{8}O → ^{263m}_{106}Sg + 4 ^{1}_{0}n → ^{259}_{104}Rf + α → ^{255}_{102}No + α

A dispute thus arose from the initial competing claims of discovery, though unlike the case of the synthetic elements up to element 105, neither team of discoverers chose to announce proposed names for the new elements, thus averting an element naming controversy temporarily. The dispute on discovery, however, dragged on until 1992, when the IUPAC/IUPAP Transfermium Working Group (TWG), formed to put an end to the controversy by making conclusions regarding discovery claims for elements 101 to 112, concluded that the Soviet synthesis of seaborgium-260 was not convincing enough, "lacking as it is in yield curves and angular selection results", whereas the American synthesis of seaborgium-263 was convincing due to its being firmly anchored to known daughter nuclei. As such, the TWG recognised the Berkeley team as official discoverers in their 1993 report.

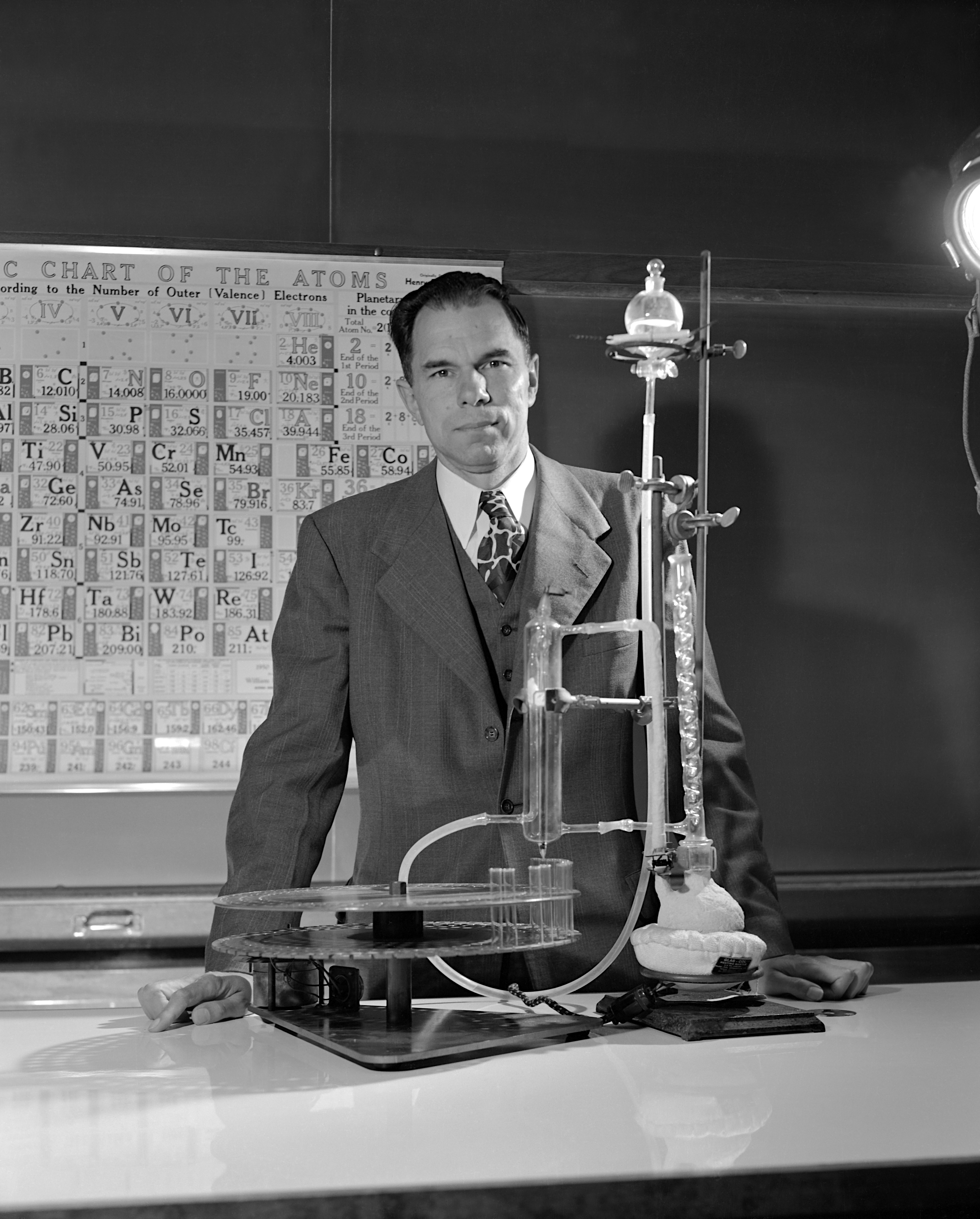
Element 106 was named after Glenn T. Seaborg, a pioneer in the discovery of synthetic elements, with the name seaborgium (Sg).

Seaborg had previously suggested to the TWG that if Berkeley was recognised as the official discoverer of elements 104 and 105, they might propose the name kurchatovium (symbol Kt) for element 106 to honour the Dubna team, which had proposed this name for element 104 after Igor Kurchatov, the former head of the Soviet nuclear research programme. However, due to the worsening relations between the competing teams after the publication of the TWG report (because the Berkeley team vehemently disagreed with the TWG's conclusions, especially regarding element 104), this proposal was dropped from consideration by the Berkeley team. After being recognized as official discoverers, the Berkeley team started deciding on a name in earnest:

...we were given credit for the discovery and the accompanying right to name the new element. The eight members of the Ghiorso group suggested a wide range of names honoring Isaac Newton, Thomas Edison, Leonardo da Vinci, Ferdinand Magellan, the mythical Ulysses, George Washington, and Finland, the native land of a member of the team. There was no focus and no front-runner for a long period.
Then one day Al [Ghiorso] walked into my office and asked what I thought of naming element 106 "seaborgium." I was floored.

— Glenn Seaborg

Seaborg's son Eric remembered the naming process as follows:

With eight scientists involved in the discovery suggesting so many good possibilities, Ghiorso despaired of reaching consensus, until he awoke one night with an idea. He approached the team members one by one, until seven of them had agreed. He then told his friend and colleague of 50 years: "We have seven votes in favor of naming element 106 seaborgium. Will you give your consent?" My father was flabbergasted, and, after consulting my mother, agreed.

— Eric Seaborg

The name seaborgium and symbol Sg were announced at the 207th national meeting of the American Chemical Society in March 1994 by Kenneth Hulet, one of the co-discovers. However, IUPAC resolved in August 1994 that an element could not be named after a living person, and Seaborg was still alive at the time. Thus, in September 1994, IUPAC recommended a set of names in which the names proposed by the three laboratories (the third being the GSI Helmholtz Centre for Heavy Ion Research in Darmstadt, Germany) with competing claims to the discovery for elements 104 to 109 were shifted to various other elements, in which rutherfordium (Rf), the Berkeley proposal for element 104, was shifted to element 106, with seaborgium being dropped entirely as a name.

Summary of element naming proposals and final decisions for elements 101–112 (those covered in the TWG report)
Atomic number	Systematic	American	Russian	German	Compromise 92	IUPAC 94	ACS 94	IUPAC 95	IUPAC 97	Present
101	unnilunium	mendelevium	—	—	mendelevium	mendelevium	mendelevium	mendelevium	mendelevium	mendelevium
102	unnilbium	nobelium	joliotium	—	joliotium	nobelium	nobelium	flerovium	nobelium	nobelium
103	unniltrium	lawrencium	rutherfordium	—	lawrencium	lawrencium	lawrencium	lawrencium	lawrencium	lawrencium
104	unnilquadium	rutherfordium	kurchatovium	—	meitnerium	dubnium	rutherfordium	dubnium	rutherfordium	rutherfordium
105	unnilpentium	hahnium	nielsbohrium	—	kurchatovium	joliotium	hahnium	joliotium	dubnium	dubnium
106	unnilhexium	seaborgium	—	—	rutherfordium	rutherfordium	seaborgium	seaborgium	seaborgium	seaborgium
107	unnilseptium	—	—	nielsbohrium	nielsbohrium	bohrium	nielsbohrium	nielsbohrium	bohrium	bohrium
108	unniloctium	—	—	hassium	hassium	hahnium	hassium	hahnium	hassium	hassium
109	unnilennium	—	—	meitnerium	hahnium	meitnerium	meitnerium	meitnerium	meitnerium	meitnerium
110	ununnilium	hahnium	becquerelium	darmstadtium	—	—	—	—	—	darmstadtium
111	unununium	—	—	roentgenium	—	—	—	—	—	roentgenium
112	ununbium	—	—	copernicium	—	—	—	—	—	copernicium

This decision ignited a firestorm of worldwide protest for disregarding the historic discoverer's right to name new elements, and against the new retroactive rule against naming elements after living persons; the American Chemical Society stood firmly behind the name seaborgium for element 106, together with all the other American and German naming proposals for elements 104 to 109, approving these names for its journals in defiance of IUPAC. At first, IUPAC defended itself, with an American member of its committee writing: "Discoverers don't have a right to name an element. They have a right to suggest a name. And, of course, we didn't infringe on that at all." However, Seaborg responded:

This would be the first time in history that the acknowledged and uncontested discoverers of an element are denied the privilege of naming it.

— Glenn Seaborg

Bowing to public pressure, IUPAC proposed a different compromise in August 1995, in which the name seaborgium was reinstated for element 106 in exchange for the removal of all but one of the other American proposals, which met an even worse response. Finally, IUPAC rescinded these previous compromises and made a final, new recommendation in August 1997, in which the American and German proposals for elements 104 to 109 were all adopted, including seaborgium for element 106, with the single exception of element 105, named dubnium to recognise the contributions of the Dubna team to the experimental procedures of transactinide synthesis. This list was finally accepted by the American Chemical Society, which wrote:

In the interest of international harmony, the Committee reluctantly accepted the name 'dubnium' for element 105 in place of 'hahnium' [the American proposal], which has had long-standing use in literature. We are pleased to note that 'seaborgium' is now the internationally approved name for element 106.

— American Chemical Society

Seaborg commented regarding the naming:

I am, needless to say, proud that U.S. chemists recommended that element 106, which is placed under tungsten (74), be called 'seaborgium.' I was looking forward to the day when chemical investigators will refer to such compounds as seaborgous chloride, seaborgic nitrate, and perhaps, sodium seaborgate.
This is the greatest honor ever bestowed upon me—even better, I think, than winning the Nobel Prize. (Note: Seaborg had in fact previously won the 1951 Nobel Prize in Chemistry together with Edwin McMillan for "their discoveries in the chemistry of the first transuranium elements".) Future students of chemistry, in learning about the periodic table, may have reason to ask why the element was named for me, and thereby learn more about my work.

— Glenn Seaborg

Seaborg died a year and a half later, on 25 February 1999, at the age of 86.

== Isotopes ==
List of seaborgium isotopes
Isotope	Half-life (Note: Different sources give different values for half-lives; the most recently published values are listed.)		Decay mode	Discovery year	Discovery reaction
Isotope	Value	ref	Decay mode	Discovery year	Discovery reaction
^{257}Sg	12.6 ms		α, SF	2025	^{206}Pb(^{52}Cr,n)
^{258}Sg	2.7 ms		SF	1997	^{209}Bi(^{51}V,2n)
^{259}Sg	402 ms		α	1985	^{207}Pb(^{54}Cr,2n)
^{259m}Sg	226 ms		α, SF	2015	^{206}Pb(^{54}Cr,n)
^{260}Sg	4.95 ms		SF, α	1984	^{208}Pb(^{54}Cr,2n)
^{261}Sg	183 ms		α, β^{+}, SF	1984	^{208}Pb(^{54}Cr,n)
^{261m}Sg	9.3 μs		IT	2010	^{208}Pb(^{54}Cr,n)
^{262}Sg	10.3 ms		SF, α	2001	^{270}Ds(—,2α)
^{263}Sg	940 ms		α, SF	1974	^{271}Ds(—,2α)
^{263m}Sg	420 ms		α	1998	^{249}Cf(^{18}O,4n)
^{264}Sg	78 ms		SF	2006	^{238}U(^{30}Si,4n)
^{265}Sg	9.2 s		α	1994	^{248}Cm(^{22}Ne,5n)
^{265m}Sg	16.4 s		α	2008	^{248}Cm(^{22}Ne,5n)
^{266}Sg	390 ms		SF	2006	^{270}Hs(—,α)
^{267}Sg	9.8 min		α	2008	^{271}Hs(—,α)
^{267m}Sg	1.7 min		SF	2024	^{271}Hs(—,α)
^{268}Sg	13 s		SF	2023	^{276}Ds(—,2α)
^{269}Sg	5 min		α, SF	2010	^{285}Fl(—,4α)
^{271}Sg	31 s		α, SF	2004	^{287}Fl(—,4α)

Superheavy elements such as seaborgium are produced by bombarding lighter elements in particle accelerators that induces fusion reactions. Whereas most of the isotopes of seaborgium can be synthesized directly this way, some heavier ones have only been observed as decay products of elements with higher atomic numbers.

Depending on the energies involved, fusion reactions that generate superheavy elements are separated into "hot" and "cold". In hot fusion reactions, very light, high-energy projectiles are accelerated toward very heavy targets (actinides), giving rise to compound nuclei at high excitation energy (~40–50 MeV) that may either fission or evaporate several (3 to 5) neutrons. In cold fusion reactions, the produced fused nuclei have a relatively low excitation energy (~10–20 MeV), which decreases the probability that these products will undergo fission reactions. As the fused nuclei cool to the ground state, they require emission of only one or two neutrons, and thus, allows for the generation of more neutron-rich products. The latter is a distinct concept from that of where nuclear fusion claimed to be achieved at room temperature conditions (see cold fusion).

Seaborgium has no stable or naturally occurring isotopes. Several radioactive isotopes have been synthesized in the laboratory, either by fusing two atoms or by observing the decay of heavier elements. Fourteen different isotopes of seaborgium have been reported with mass numbers 257–269 and 271, four of which, seaborgium-261, −263, −265, and −267, have known metastable states. All of these decay only through alpha decay and spontaneous fission, with the single exception of seaborgium-261 that can also undergo electron capture to dubnium-261.

There is a trend toward increasing half-lives for the heavier isotopes, though even–odd isotopes are generally more stable than their neighboring even–even isotopes, because the odd neutron leads to increased hindrance of spontaneous fission; among known seaborgium isotopes, alpha decay is the predominant decay mode in even–odd nuclei whereas fission dominates in even–even nuclei. Three of the heaviest known isotopes, ^{267}Sg, ^{269}Sg, and ^{271}Sg, are also the longest-lived, having half-lives on the order of several minutes. Some other isotopes in this region are predicted to have comparable or even longer half-lives. Additionally, ^{263}Sg, ^{265}Sg, ^{265m}Sg, and ^{268}Sg have half-lives measured in seconds. All the remaining isotopes have half-lives measured in milliseconds, with the exception of the shortest-lived isotope, ^{261m}Sg, with a half-life of only 9.3 microseconds.

The proton-rich isotopes from ^{257}Sg to ^{261}Sg were directly produced by cold fusion; all heavier isotopes were produced from the repeated alpha decay of the heavier elements hassium, darmstadtium, and flerovium, with the exceptions of the isotopes ^{263m}Sg, ^{264}Sg, ^{265}Sg, and ^{265m}Sg, which were directly produced by hot fusion through irradiation of actinide targets.

== Predicted properties ==
Very few properties of seaborgium or its compounds have been measured; this is due to its extremely limited and expensive production and the fact that seaborgium (and its parents) decays very quickly. A few singular chemistry-related properties have been measured, but properties of seaborgium metal remain unknown and only predictions are available.

=== Physical ===
Seaborgium is expected to be a solid under normal conditions and assume a body-centered cubic crystal structure, similar to its lighter congener tungsten. Early predictions estimated that it should be a very heavy metal with density around 35.0 g/cm^{3}, but calculations in 2011 and 2013 predicted a somewhat lower value of 23–24 g/cm^{3}.

=== Chemical ===
Seaborgium is the fourth member of the 6d series of transition metals and the heaviest member of group 6 in the periodic table, below chromium, molybdenum, and tungsten. All the members of the group form a diversity of oxoanions. They readily portray their group oxidation state of +6, although this is highly oxidising in the case of chromium, and this state becomes more and more stable to reduction as the group is descended: indeed, tungsten is the last of the 5d transition metals where all four 5d electrons participate in metallic bonding. As such, seaborgium should have +6 as its most stable oxidation state, both in the gas phase and in aqueous solution, and this is the only positive oxidation state that is experimentally known for it; the +5 and +4 states should be less stable, and the +3 state, the most common for chromium, would be the least stable for seaborgium.

This stabilisation of the highest oxidation state occurs in the early 6d elements because of the similarity between the energies of the 6d and 7s orbitals, since the 7s orbitals are relativistically stabilised and the 6d orbitals are relativistically destabilised. This effect is so large in the seventh period that seaborgium is expected to lose its 6d electrons before its 7s electrons (Sg, [Rn]5f^{14}6d^{4}7s^{2}; Sg^{+}, [Rn]5f^{14}6d^{3}7s^{2}; Sg^{2+}, [Rn]5f^{14}6d^{3}7s^{1}; Sg^{4+}, [Rn]5f^{14}6d^{2}; Sg^{6+}, [Rn]5f^{14}). Because of the great destabilisation of the 7s orbital, Sg^{IV} should be even more unstable than W^{IV} and should be very readily oxidised to Sg^{VI}. The predicted ionic radius of the hexacoordinate Sg^{6+} ion is 65 pm, while the predicted atomic radius of seaborgium is 128 pm. Nevertheless, the stability of the highest oxidation state is still expected to decrease as Lr^{III} > Rf^{IV} > Db^{V} > Sg^{VI}. Some predicted standard reduction potentials for seaborgium ions in aqueous acidic solution are as follows:

2 SgO_{3} + 2 H^{+} + 2 e^{−}	⇌ Sg_{2}O_{5} + H_{2}O	E^{~~o~~} = −0.046 V
Sg_{2}O_{5} + 2 H^{+} + 2 e^{−}	⇌ 2 SgO_{2} + H_{2}O	E^{~~o~~} = +0.11 V
SgO_{2} + 4 H^{+} + e^{−}	⇌ Sg^{3+} + 2 H_{2}O	E^{~~o~~} = −1.34 V
Sg^{3+} + e^{−}	⇌ Sg^{2+}	E^{~~o~~} = −0.11 V
Sg^{3+} + 3 e^{−}	⇌ Sg	E^{~~o~~} = +0.27 V

Seaborgium should form a very volatile hexafluoride (SgF_{6}) as well as a moderately volatile hexachloride (SgCl_{6}), pentachloride (SgCl_{5}), and oxychlorides SgO_{2}Cl_{2} and SgOCl_{4}. SgO_{2}Cl_{2} is expected to be the most stable of the seaborgium oxychlorides and to be the least volatile of the group 6 oxychlorides, with the sequence MoO_{2}Cl_{2} > WO_{2}Cl_{2} > SgO_{2}Cl_{2}. The volatile seaborgium(VI) compounds SgCl_{6} and SgOCl_{4} are expected to be unstable to decomposition to seaborgium(V) compounds at high temperatures, analogous to MoCl_{6} and MoOCl_{4}; this should not happen for SgO_{2}Cl_{2} due to the much higher energy gap between the highest occupied and lowest unoccupied molecular orbitals, despite the similar Sg–Cl bond strengths (similarly to molybdenum and tungsten).

Molybdenum and tungsten are very similar to each other and show important differences from the smaller chromium; seaborgium is expected to follow the chemistry of tungsten and molybdenum quite closely, forming an even greater variety of oxoanions, the simplest among them being seaborgate, SgO_{4}^{2−}. This would form from the rapid hydrolysis of Sg(H_{2}O)_{6}^{6+}, although this would take place less readily than with molybdenum and tungsten as expected from seaborgium's greater size. Seaborgium should hydrolyse less readily than tungsten in hydrofluoric acid at low concentrations, but more readily at high concentrations, also forming complexes such as SgO_{3}F^{−} and SgOF_{5}^{−}: complex formation competes with hydrolysis in hydrofluoric acid.

== Experimental chemistry ==
Experimental chemical investigation of seaborgium has been hampered due to the need to produce it one atom at a time, its short half-life, and the resulting necessary harshness of the experimental conditions. The isotope ^{265}Sg and its isomer ^{265m}Sg are advantageous for radiochemistry: they are produced in the ^{248}Cm(^{22}Ne,5n) reaction.

In the first experimental chemical studies of seaborgium in 1995 and 1996, seaborgium atoms were produced in the reaction ^{248}Cm(^{22}Ne,4n)^{266}Sg, thermalised, and reacted with an O_{2}/HCl mixture. The adsorption properties of the resulting oxychloride were measured and compared with those of molybdenum and tungsten compounds. The results indicated that seaborgium formed a volatile oxychloride akin to those of the other group 6 elements, and confirmed the decreasing trend of oxychloride volatility down group 6:

Sg + O_{2} + 2 HCl → SgO_{2}Cl_{2} + H_{2}

In 2001, a team continued the study of the gas phase chemistry of seaborgium by reacting the element with O_{2} in a H_{2}O environment. In a manner similar to the formation of the oxychloride, the results of the experiment indicated the formation of seaborgium oxide hydroxide, a reaction well known among the lighter group 6 homologues as well as the pseudohomologue uranium.

2 Sg + 3 O_{2} → 2 SgO_{3}
SgO_{3} + H_{2}O → SgO_{2}(OH)_{2}

Predictions on the aqueous chemistry of seaborgium have largely been confirmed. In experiments conducted in 1997 and 1998, seaborgium was eluted from cation-exchange resin using a HNO_{3}/HF solution, most likely as neutral SgO_{2}F_{2} or the anionic complex ion [SgO_{2}F_{3}]^{−} rather than SgO_{4}^{2−}. In contrast, in 0.1 M nitric acid, seaborgium does not elute, unlike molybdenum and tungsten, indicating that the hydrolysis of [Sg(H_{2}O)_{9}]^{6+} only proceeds as far as the cationic complex [Sg(OH)_{4}(H_{2}O)]^{2+} or [SgO(OH)_{3}(H_{2}O)_{2}]^{+}, while that of molybdenum and tungsten proceed to neutral [MO_{2}(OH)_{2}].

The only other oxidation state known for seaborgium other than the group oxidation state of +6 is the zero oxidation state. Similarly to its three lighter congeners, forming chromium hexacarbonyl, molybdenum hexacarbonyl, and tungsten hexacarbonyl, seaborgium has been shown in 2014 to also form seaborgium hexacarbonyl, Sg(CO)_{6}. Like its molybdenum and tungsten homologues, seaborgium hexacarbonyl is a volatile compound that reacts readily with silicon dioxide.

== Absence in nature ==
Searches for long-lived primordial nuclides of seaborgium in nature have all yielded negative results. One 2022 study estimated the concentration of seaborgium atoms in natural tungsten (its chemical homolog) is less than 5.1×10^{−15} atom(Sg)/atom(W).

== Bibliography ==
- Audi, G.; Kondev, F. G.; Wang, M.; et al. (2017). "The NUBASE2016 evaluation of nuclear properties". Chinese Physics C. 41 (3) 030001. Bibcode:2017ChPhC..41c0001A. doi:10.1088/1674-1137/41/3/030001.
- Beiser, A. (2003). Concepts of modern physics (6th ed.). McGraw-Hill. ISBN 978-0-07-244848-1. OCLC 48965418.
- Hoffman, D. C.; Ghiorso, A.; Seaborg, G. T. (2000). The Transuranium People: The Inside Story. World Scientific. ISBN 978-1-78-326244-1.
- Kragh, H. (2018). From Transuranic to Superheavy Elements: A Story of Dispute and Creation. Springer. ISBN 978-3-319-75813-8.
- Zagrebaev, V.; Karpov, A.; Greiner, W. (2013). "Future of superheavy element research: Which nuclei could be synthesized within the next few years?". Journal of Physics: Conference Series. 420 (1) 012001. arXiv:1207.5700. Bibcode:2013JPhCS.420a2001Z. doi:10.1088/1742-6596/420/1/012001. ISSN 1742-6588. S2CID 55434734.
