= Isotopes of rutherfordium =

Isotopes of rutherfordium (_{104}Rf)
| Main isotopes | | | Decay | |
| Isotope | abundance | half-life (t_{1/2}) | mode | product |
|---|---|---|---|---|
| ^{261m}Rf | synth | 1.2 min | α | ^{257}No |
| ^{263}Rf | synth | 15 min | SF | – |
| ^{265}Rf | synth | 1.3 min | SF | – |
| ^{267}Rf | synth | 48 min | SF | – |

Rutherfordium (_{104}Rf) is a synthetic element and thus has no stable isotopes. A standard atomic weight cannot be given. The first isotope to be synthesized was either ^{259}Rf in 1966 or ^{257}Rf in 1969. There are 17 known radioisotopes from ^{252}Rf to ^{270}Rf (three of which, ^{266}Rf, ^{268}Rf, and ^{270}Rf, are unconfirmed) and several isomers. The longest-lived isotope is ^{267}Rf with a half-life of 48 minutes, and the longest-lived isomer is ^{261m}Rf with a half-life of 74 seconds.

== List of isotopes ==
| Nuclide (Note: ^{m}Rf – Excited nuclear isomer.) | Z | N | Isotopic mass (Da) (Note: ( ) – Uncertainty (1σ) is given in concise form in parentheses after the corresponding last digits.) (Note: # – Atomic mass marked #: value and uncertainty derived not from purely experimental data, but at least partly from trends from the Mass Surface (TMS).) | Discovery year | Half-life (Note: # – Values marked # are not purely derived from experimental data, but at least partly from trends of neighboring nuclides (TNN).) | Decay mode (Note: Modes of decay: SF: / Spontaneous fission) | Daughter isotope | Spin and parity (Note: ( ) spin value – Indicates spin with weak assignment arguments.) |
| Nuclide | Excitation energy | | | Discovery year | Half-life | Decay mode | Daughter isotope | Spin and parity |
|---|---|---|---|---|---|---|---|---|
| ^{252}Rf | 104 | 148 | | 2025 | 60+90 −30 ns | SF | (various) | 0+ |
| ^{252m}Rf | | | | 2025 | 13+4 −3 μs | SF (≤90%) | (various) | (6+) |
| ^{252m}Rf | | | | 2025 | 13+4 −3 μs | IT (≥10%) | ^{252}Rf | (6+) |
| ^{253}Rf | 104 | 149 | 253.10053(44)# | 1997 | 9.9(12) ms | SF (83%) | (various) | (1/2+) |
| ^{253}Rf | 104 | 149 | 253.10053(44)# | 1997 | 9.9(12) ms | α (17%) | ^{249}No | (1/2+) |
| ^{253m1}Rf (Note: Order of ground state and isomer is uncertain.) | 200(150)# keV | | | 1997 | 52.8(44) μs | SF | (various) | (7/2+) |
| ^{253m2}Rf | >1020 keV | | | 2022 | 660+400 −180 μs | IT | ^{253m1}Rf | |
| ^{254}Rf | 104 | 150 | 254.10006(30)# | 1997 | 22.9(10) μs | SF | (various) | 0+ |
| ^{254m1}Rf | 1300(200)# keV | | | 2015 | 4.3(7) μs | IT | ^{254}Rf | 8−# |
| ^{254m2}Rf | 2000(500)# keV | | | 2015 | 247(73) μs | IT | ^{254m1}Rf | 16+# |
| ^{255}Rf | 104 | 151 | 255.10127(19)# | 1975 | 1.69(3) s | SF (50.9%) | (various) | (9/2−) |
| ^{255}Rf | 104 | 151 | 255.10127(19)# | 1975 | 1.69(3) s | α (49.1%) | ^{251}No | (9/2−) |
| ^{255}Rf | 104 | 151 | 255.10127(19)# | 1975 | 1.69(3) s | β^{+} (<6%) | ^{255}Lr | (9/2−) |
| ^{255m1}Rf | 150 keV | | | 2015 | 50(17) μs | IT | ^{255}Rf | (5/2+) |
| ^{255m2}Rf | 1103 keV | | | 2020 | 29+7 −5 μs | IT | ^{255}Rf | (19/2+) |
| ^{255m3}Rf | 1303 keV | | | 2020 | 49+13 −10 μs | IT | ^{255}Rf | (25/2+) |
| ^{256}Rf | 104 | 152 | 256.101151(19) | 1975 | 6.60(5) ms | SF (99.69%) | (various) | 0+ |
| ^{256}Rf | 104 | 152 | 256.101151(19) | 1975 | 6.60(5) ms | α (0.31%) | ^{252}No | 0+ |
| ^{256m1}Rf | 1120(100)# keV | | | 2009 | 25(2) μs | IT | ^{256}Rf | 4−# |
| ^{256m2}Rf | 1400(100)# keV | | | 2009 | 17(2) μs | IT | ^{256m1}Rf | 8−# |
| ^{256m3}Rf | 2400(200)# keV | | | 2009 | 27(5) μs | IT | ^{256m2}Rf | |
| ^{257}Rf | 104 | 153 | 257.102917(12) | 1969 | 6.2+1.2 −1.0 s | α (89.3%) | ^{253}No | (1/2+) |
| ^{257}Rf | 104 | 153 | 257.102917(12) | 1969 | 6.2+1.2 −1.0 s | β^{+} (9.4%) | ^{257m}Lr | (1/2+) |
| ^{257}Rf | 104 | 153 | 257.102917(12) | 1969 | 6.2+1.2 −1.0 s | SF (1.3%) | (various) | (1/2+) |
| ^{257m1}Rf | 74 keV | | | 1997 | 4.37(5) s | α (80.54%) | ^{253}No | (11/2−) |
| ^{257m1}Rf | 74 keV | | | 1997 | 4.37(5) s | IT (14.2%) | ^{257}Rf | (11/2−) |
| ^{257m1}Rf | 74 keV | | | 1997 | 4.37(5) s | β^{+} (4.86%) | ^{257}Lr | (11/2−) |
| ^{257m1}Rf | 74 keV | | | 1997 | 4.37(5) s | SF (0.4%) | (various) | (11/2−) |
| ^{257m2}Rf | 1155(11) keV | | | 2009 | 106(6) μs | IT | ^{257m1}Rf | 21/2+# |
| ^{258}Rf | 104 | 154 | 258.103430(17) | 1969 | 12.5(5) ms | SF (95.1%) | (various) | 0+ |
| ^{258}Rf | 104 | 154 | 258.103430(17) | 1969 | 12.5(5) ms | α (4.9%) | ^{254}No | 0+ |
| ^{258m1}Rf | 1200(300)# keV | | | 2016 | 2.4+2.4 −0.8 ms [3.4(17) ms] | IT | ^{258}Rf | |
| ^{258m2}Rf | 1500(500)# keV | | | 2016 | 15(10) μs | IT | ^{258m1}Rf | |
| ^{259}Rf | 104 | 155 | 259.10560(8)# | 1969 | 2.63(26) s | α (85%) | ^{255}No | 3/2+# |
| ^{259}Rf | 104 | 155 | 259.10560(8)# | 1969 | 2.63(26) s | β^{+} (15%) | ^{259}Lr | 3/2+# |
| ^{260}Rf | 104 | 156 | 260.10644(22)# | 1985 | 21(1) ms | SF | (various) | 0+ |
| ^{260}Rf | 104 | 156 | 260.10644(22)# | 1985 | 21(1) ms | α (<20%) | ^{256}No | 0+ |
| ^{261}Rf | 104 | 157 | 261.10877(7) | 1970 | 2.1(2) s | SF (82%) | (various) | 3/2+# |
| ^{261}Rf | 104 | 157 | 261.10877(7) | 1970 | 2.1(2) s | α (18%) | ^{257}No | 3/2+# |
| ^{261m}Rf | 70(100)# keV | | | 2002 | 74(5) s | α | ^{257}No | 11/2−# |
| ^{262}Rf | 104 | 158 | 262.10992(24)# | 1985 | 210+128 −58 ms [250(100) ms] | SF | (various) | 0+ |
| ^{262m}Rf | 1000(400)# keV | | | (1978) (Note: Isotopic assignment uncertain, not included in discovery database) | 47(5) ms | SF | (various) | (8−,9−)# |
| ^{263}Rf | 104 | 159 | 263.11246(16)# | 2003 | 11(3) min | SF | (various) | 3/2+# |
| ^{263m}Rf (Note: Not directly synthesized, occurs in decay chain of ^{271}Hs) | | | | 2008 | 5.1+4.6 −1.7 s | SF | (various) | 1/2# |
| ^{265}Rf (Note: Not directly synthesized, occurs in decay chain of ^{285}Fl) | 104 | 161 | 265.11668(39)# | 2010 | 1.3+0.8 −0.3 min | SF | (various) | 9/2+# |
| ^{266}Rf (Note: Discovery of this isotope is unconfirmed) (Note: Not directly synthesized, occurs in decay chain of ^{282}Nh) | 104 | 162 | 266.11824(44)# | (2011) | 23 s# | SF | (various) | 0+ |
| ^{267}Rf (Note: Not directly synthesized, occurs in decay chain of ^{287}Fl) | 104 | 163 | 267.12179(62)# | 2004 | 48+23 −12 min | SF | (various) | 13/2−# |
| ^{268}Rf (Note: Not directly synthesized, occurs in decay chain of ^{288}Mc) | 104 | 164 | 268.12397(71)# | (2011) | 1.4 s# | SF | (various) | 0+ |
| ^{270}Rf (Note: Not directly synthesized, occurs in decay chain of ^{294}Ts) | 104 | 166 | | (2011) | 20 ms# | SF | (various) | 0+ |
This table header & footer:

== Nucleosynthesis ==
Super-heavy elements such as rutherfordium are produced by bombarding lighter elements in particle accelerators that induces fusion reactions. Whereas most of the isotopes of rutherfordium can be synthesized directly this way, some heavier ones have only been observed as decay products of elements with higher atomic numbers.

Depending on the energies involved, the former are separated into "hot" and "cold". In hot fusion reactions, very light, high-energy projectiles are accelerated toward very heavy targets (actinides), giving rise to compound nuclei at high excitation energy (~40–50 MeV) that may either fission or evaporate several (3 to 5) neutrons. In cold fusion reactions, the produced fused nuclei have a relatively low excitation energy (~10–20 MeV), which decreases the probability that these products will undergo fission reactions. As the fused nuclei cool to the ground state, they require emission of only one or two neutrons, and thus, allows for the generation of more neutron-rich products. The latter is a distinct concept from that of where nuclear fusion claimed to be achieved at room temperature conditions (see cold fusion).

=== Hot fusion studies ===
The synthesis of rutherfordium was first attempted in 1964 by the team at Dubna using the hot fusion reaction of neon-22 projectiles with plutonium-242 targets:

^{242}_{94}Pu + ^{22}_{10}Ne → ^{264−x}_{104}Rf + 3 or 5 n.

The first study produced evidence for a spontaneous fission with a 0.3 second half-life and another one at 8 seconds. While the former observation was eventually retracted, the latter eventually became associated with the ^{259}Rf isotope. In 1966, the Soviet team repeated the experiment using a chemical study of volatile chloride products. They identified a volatile chloride with eka-hafnium properties that decayed fast through spontaneous fission. This gave strong evidence for the formation of RfCl_{4}, and although a half-life was not accurately measured, later evidence suggested that the product was most likely ^{259}Rf. The team repeated the experiment several times over the next few years, and in 1971, they revised the spontaneous fission half-life for the isotope at 4.5 seconds.

In 1969, researchers at the University of California led by Albert Ghiorso, tried to confirm the original results reported at Dubna. In a reaction of curium-248 with oxygen-16, they were unable to confirm the result of the Soviet team, but managed to observe the spontaneous fission of ^{260}Rf with a very short half-life of 10–30 ms:

^{248}_{96}Cm + ^{16}_{8}O → ^{260}_{104}Rf + 4 n.

In 1970, the American team also studied the same reaction with oxygen-18 and identified ^{261}Rf with a half-life of 65 seconds (later refined to 75 seconds). Later experiments at the Lawrence Berkeley National Laboratory in California also revealed the formation of a short-lived isomer of ^{262}Rf (which undergoes spontaneous fission with a half-life of 47 ms), and spontaneous fission activities with long lifetimes tentatively assigned to ^{263}Rf.

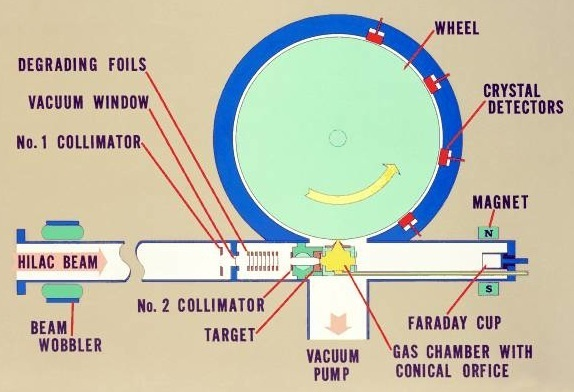
Diagram of the experimental set-up used in the discovery of isotopes ^{257}Rf and ^{259}Rf

The reaction of californium-249 with carbon-13 was also investigated by the Ghiorso team, which indicated the formation of the short-lived ^{258}Rf (which undergoes spontaneous fission in 11 ms):

^{249}_{98}Cf + ^{13}_{6}C → ^{258}_{104}Rf + 4 n.

In trying to confirm these results by using carbon-12 instead, they also observed the first alpha decays from ^{257}Rf.

The reaction of berkelium-249 with nitrogen-14 was first studied in Dubna in 1977, and in 1985, researchers there confirmed the formation of the ^{260}Rf isotope which quickly undergoes spontaneous fission in 28 ms:

^{249}_{97}Bk + ^{14}_{7}N → ^{260}_{104}Rf + 3 n.

In 1996 the isotope ^{262}Rf was observed in LBNL from the fusion of plutonium-244 with neon-22:

^{244}_{94}Pu + ^{22}_{10}Ne → ^{266−x}_{104}Rf + 4 or 5 n.

The team determined a half-life of 2.1 seconds, in contrast to earlier reports of 47 ms and suggested that the two half-lives might be due to different isomeric states of ^{262}Rf. Studies on the same reaction by a team at Dubna, lead to the observation in 2000 of alpha decays from ^{261}Rf and spontaneous fissions of ^{261m}Rf.

The hot fusion reaction using a uranium target was first reported at Dubna in 2000:

^{238}_{92}U + ^{26}_{12}Mg → ^{264−x}_{104}Rf + x n (x = 3, 4, 5, 6).

They observed decays from ^{260}Rf and ^{259}Rf, and later for ^{259}Rf. In 2006, as part of their program on the study of uranium targets in hot fusion reactions, the team at LBNL also observed ^{261}Rf.

=== Cold fusion studies ===
The first cold fusion experiments involving element 104 were done in 1974 at Dubna, by using light titanium-50 nuclei aimed at lead-208 isotope targets:

^{208}_{82}Pb + ^{50}_{22}Ti → ^{258−x}_{104}Rf + x n (x = 1, 2, or 3).

The measurement of a spontaneous fission activity was assigned to ^{256}Rf, while later studies done at the Gesellschaft für Schwerionenforschung Institute (GSI), also measured decay properties for the isotopes ^{257}Rf, and ^{255}Rf.

In 1974 researchers at Dubna investigated the reaction of lead-207 with titanium-50 to produce the isotope ^{255}Rf. In a 1994 study at GSI using the lead-206 isotope, ^{255}Rf as well as ^{254}Rf were detected. ^{253}Rf was similarly detected that year when lead-204 was used instead.

=== Decay studies ===
Most isotopes with an atomic mass below 262 have also observed as decay products of elements with a higher atomic number, allowing for refinement of their previously measured properties. Heavier isotopes of rutherfordium have only been observed as decay products. For example, a few alpha decay events terminating in ^{267}Rf were observed in the decay chain of darmstadtium-279 since 2004:

^{279}_{110}Ds → ^{275}_{108}Hs + α → ^{271}_{106}Sg + α → ^{267}_{104}Rf + α.

This further underwent spontaneous fission with a half-life of about 1.3 h.

Investigations on the synthesis of the dubnium-263 isotope in 1999 at the University of Bern revealed events consistent with electron capture to form ^{263}Rf. A rutherfordium fraction was separated, and several spontaneous fission events with long half-lives of about 15 minutes were observed, as well as alpha decays with half-lives of about 10 minutes. Reports on the decay chain of flerovium-285 in 2010 showed five sequential alpha decays that terminate in ^{265}Rf, which further undergoes spontaneous fission with a half-life of 152 seconds.

Some experimental evidence was obtained in 2004 for a heavier isotope, ^{268}Rf, in the decay chain of an isotope of moscovium:

^{288}_{115}Mc → ^{284}_{113}Nh + α → ^{280}_{111}Rg + α → ^{276}_{109}Mt + α → ^{272}_{107}Bh + α → ^{268}_{105}Db + α ? → ^{268}_{104}Rf + ν_{e}.

However, the last step in this chain was uncertain. After observing the five alpha decay events that generate dubnium-268, spontaneous fission events were observed with a long half-life. It is unclear whether these events were due to direct spontaneous fission of ^{268}Db, or ^{268}Db produced electron capture events with long half-lives to generate ^{268}Rf. If the latter is produced and decays with a short half-life, the two possibilities cannot be distinguished. Given that the electron capture of ^{268}Db cannot be detected, these spontaneous fission events may be due to ^{268}Rf, in which case the half-life of this isotope cannot be extracted. A similar mechanism is proposed for the formation of the even heavier isotope ^{270}Rf as a short-lived daughter of ^{270}Db (in the decay chain of ^{294}Ts, first synthesized in 2010) which then undergoes spontaneous fission:

^{294}_{117}Ts → ^{290}_{115}Mc + α → ^{286}_{113}Nh + α → ^{282}_{111}Rg + α → ^{278}_{109}Mt + α → ^{274}_{107}Bh + α → ^{270}_{105}Db + α ? → ^{270}_{104}Rf + ν_{e}.

According to a 2007 report on the synthesis of nihonium, the isotope ^{282}Nh was twice observed to undergo a similar decay to form ^{266}Db. In one case this underwent spontaneous fission with a half-life of 22 minutes. Given that the electron capture of ^{266}Db cannot be detected, these spontaneous fission events may be due to ^{266}Rf, in which case the half-life of this isotope cannot be extracted. In the other case, no spontaneous fission event was observed; it could have been missed, or ^{266}Db might have undergone two more alpha decays to long-lived ^{258}Md, with a half-life (51.5 d) longer than the total time of the experiment.

=== Nuclear isomerism ===
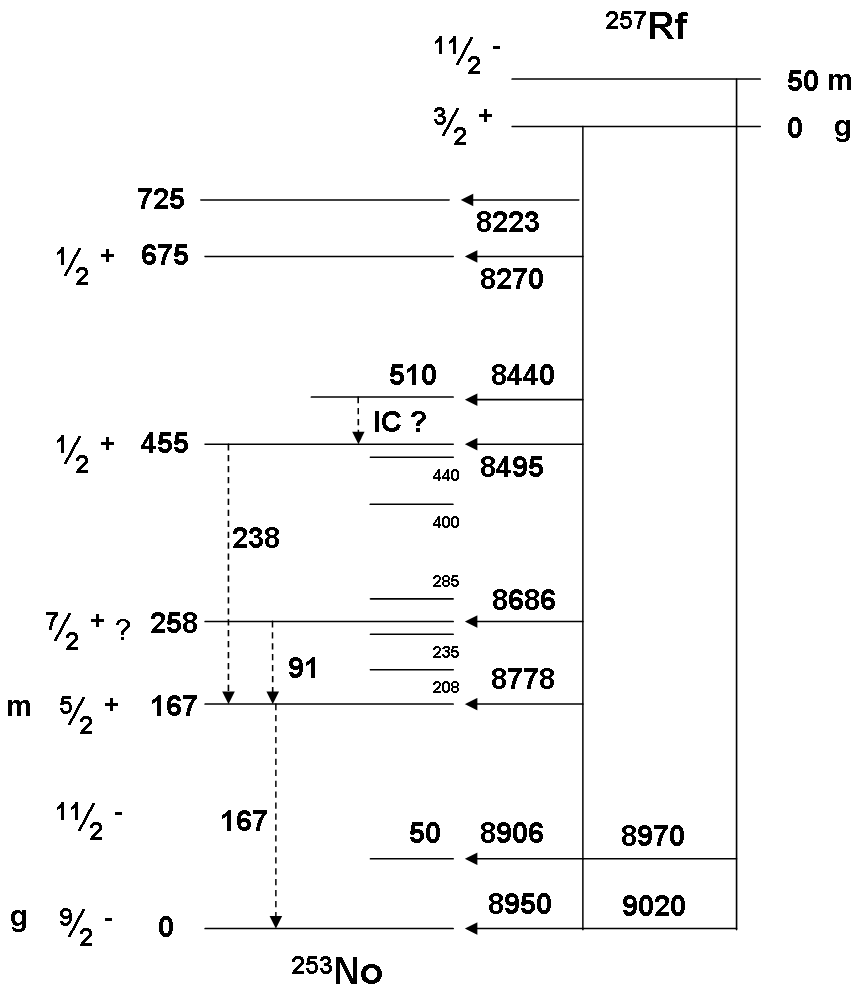
Currently suggested decay level scheme for ^{257}Rf^{g,m} from the studies reported in 2007 by Hessberger et al. at GSI

Several early studies on the synthesis of ^{263}Rf have indicated that this nuclide decays primarily by spontaneous fission with a half-life of 10–20 minutes. More recently, a study of hassium isotopes allowed the synthesis of atoms of ^{263}Rf decaying with a shorter half-life of 8 seconds. These two different decay modes must be associated with two isomeric states, but specific assignments are difficult due to the low number of observed events.

During research on the synthesis of rutherfordium isotopes utilizing the ^{244}Pu(^{22}Ne,5n)^{261}Rf reaction, the product was found to undergo 8.28 MeV alpha decay with a half-life of 78 seconds. Later studies at GSI on the synthesis of copernicium and hassium isotopes produced conflicting data, as ^{261}Rf produced in the decay chain was found to undergo 8.52 MeV alpha decay with a half-life of 4 seconds. Later results indicated a predominant fission branch. These contradictions led to some doubt on the discovery of copernicium. The first isomer is now denoted ^{261m}Rf and the second ^{261}Rf, as it is thought that the first nucleus belongs to a high-spin metastable state and the latter the low-spin ground state. This analysis of ^{261}Rf provided evidence for the discovery of copernicium in 1996.

A detailed spectroscopic study of the production of ^{257}Rf nuclei using the reaction ^{208}Pb(^{50}Ti,n)^{257}Rf allowed the identification of an isomeric level in ^{257}Rf. The work confirmed that ^{257g}Rf has a complex spectrum with 15 alpha lines. A level structure diagram was calculated for both isomers. Similar isomers were reported for ^{256}Rf also.

== Chemical yields of isotopes ==
=== Cold fusion ===
The table below provides cross-sections and excitation energies for cold fusion reactions producing rutherfordium isotopes directly. Data in bold represents maxima derived from excitation function measurements. + represents an observed exit channel.

| Projectile | Target | CN | 1n | 2n | 3n |
|---|---|---|---|---|---|
| ^{50}Ti | ^{208}Pb | ^{258}Rf | **38.0 nb, 17.0 MeV** | **12.3 nb, 21.5 MeV** | **660 pb, 29.0 MeV** |
| ^{50}Ti | ^{207}Pb | ^{257}Rf | 4.8 nb | | |
| ^{50}Ti | ^{206}Pb | ^{256}Rf | 800 pb, 21.5 MeV | 2.4 nb, 21.5 MeV | |
| ^{50}Ti | ^{204}Pb | ^{254}Rf | 190 pb, 15.6 MeV | | |
| ^{48}Ti | ^{208}Pb | ^{256}Rf | **380 pb, 17.0 MeV** | | |

=== Hot fusion ===
The table below provides cross-sections and excitation energies for hot fusion reactions producing rutherfordium isotopes directly. Data in bold represents maxima derived from excitation function measurements. + represents an observed exit channel.

| Projectile | Target | CN | 3n | 4n | 5n |
|---|---|---|---|---|---|
| ^{26}Mg | ^{238}U | ^{264}Rf | | 240 pb | 1.1 nb |
| ^{22}Ne | ^{244}Pu | ^{266}Rf | | + | 4.0 nb |
| ^{18}O | ^{248}Cm | ^{266}Rf | | + | 13.0 nb |
