= List of elements by stability of isotopes =

Isotope half-lives. The darker more stable isotope region departs from the line of protons (Z) = neutrons (N), as the element number Z becomes larger.

Of the first 82 chemical elements in the periodic table, 80 have isotopes considered to be stable. Overall, there are 251 known stable isotopes in total.

== Background ==
Atomic nuclei consist of protons and neutrons, which attract each other through the nuclear force, while protons repel each other via the electric force due to their positive charge. These two forces compete, leading to some combinations of neutrons and protons being more stable than others. Neutrons stabilize the nucleus, because they attract protons, which helps offset the electrical repulsion between protons. As a result, as the number of protons increases, an increasing ratio of neutrons to protons is needed to form a stable nucleus; if too many or too few neutrons are present with regard to the optimum ratio, the nucleus becomes unstable and subject to certain types of nuclear decay. Unstable isotopes decay through various radioactive decay pathways, most commonly alpha decay or beta decay, but rarer types of decay including spontaneous fission and cluster decay are known.

Of the first 82 elements in the periodic table, 80 have isotopes considered to be stable. The 83rd element, bismuth, was traditionally regarded as having the heaviest stable isotope, bismuth-209, but in 2003 researchers in Orsay, France, measured the decay of ^{209}Bi; the currently accepted half-life is 2.01×10^{19} years. Technetium and promethium (atomic numbers 43 and 61, respectively (Note: See Stability of technetium isotopes and Stability of promethium isotopes for a discussion as to why technetium and promethium have no stable isotopes.)) and all the elements with an atomic number over 82 only have isotopes that are known to undergo radioactive decay. No undiscovered elements are expected to be stable; therefore, lead is considered the heaviest stable element. However, it is possible that some isotopes that are now considered stable will be revealed to decay with extremely long half-lives (as happened with bismuth).

For each of the 80 stable elements, the number of stable isotopes is given. Only 90 isotopes are stable against any possible decay, and an additional 161 are energetically unstable (see List of nuclides) but have never been observed to decay. Thus, 251 isotopes (nuclides) are stable by definition (including an excited state, tantalum-180m, for which no decay has yet been observed).

In April 2019 it was announced that the half-life of xenon-124 had been measured to 1.8 × 10^{22} years. This is the longest half-life directly measured for any unstable isotope; only the (indirectly measured) half-life of tellurium-128 is longer.

Of the chemical elements, only 1 element (tin) has 10 such stable isotopes, 5 have 7 stable isotopes, 7 have 6 stable isotopes, 11 have 5 stable isotopes, 9 have 4 stable isotopes, 5 have 3 stable isotopes, 16 have 2 stable isotopes, and 26 have 1 stable isotope.

Additionally, 31 nuclides of the naturally occurring elements have unstable isotopes with a half-life long enough to have survived for the age of the Solar System (10^{8} years or more), and an additional four such nuclides represent three elements (bismuth, thorium, uranium) having no stable isotope. These 35 radioactive naturally occurring nuclides comprise the radioactive primordial nuclides. The total number of primordial nuclides is then 251 (the stable nuclides) plus the 35 radioactive primordial nuclides, for a total of 286.

The longest known half-life of 2.2 × 10^{24} years of tellurium-128 was measured by the method of detecting its radiogenic daughter xenon-128; this has been used for other isotopes with noble-gas daughters and barium-130 has also been measured no other way. Another notable example is the only naturally occurring isotope of bismuth, bismuth-209, which has been predicted to be unstable with a very long half-life, but has been observed to decay. Because of their long half-lives, such isotopes are still found on Earth in various quantities, and together with the stable isotopes they are called primordial isotopes. For a list of primordial nuclides in order of half-life, see List of nuclides.

118 chemical elements are known to exist. The first 94 are found in nature, and the remainder of the discovered elements are artificially produced, with isotopes all known to be radioactive with relatively short half-lives (see below). The elements in this list are ordered according to the lifetime of their most stable isotope. Of these, three elements (bismuth, thorium, and uranium) are primordial because they have half-lives long enough to still be found on the Earth, (Note: Of these three primordial but unstable elements, two more non-primordial isotopes are found in nature in significant amounts: ^{234}U and ^{230}Th, both radiogenic as decay products of ^{238}U.) while all the others are produced either by radioactive decay or are synthesized in laboratories and nuclear reactors. Only 13 of the 38 unstable elements have a known isotope with a half-life of at least 100 years. Every known isotope of the remaining 25 elements is highly radioactive; these are used in academic research and sometimes in industry and medicine. (Note: See many different industrial and medical applications of radioactive elements in Radionuclide, Nuclear medicine, Common beta emitters, Commonly used gamma-emitting isotopes, Fluorine-18, Cobalt-60, Strontium-90, Technetium-99m, Iodine-123, Iodine-124, Promethium-147, Iridium-192, etc.) Some of the heavier elements in the periodic table may be revealed to have yet-undiscovered isotopes with longer lifetimes than those listed here. (Note: For elements with a higher atomic number than californium (with Z>98), there might exist undiscovered isotopes that are more stable than the known ones.)

About 338 nuclides are found naturally on Earth. These comprise not only the 286 primordials, but also include about 52 shorter-lived isotopes that either are daughters of primordial isotopes (such as radium from uranium) or are made by energetic natural processes, such as carbon-14 made from atmospheric nitrogen by bombardment from cosmic rays.

== Elements by number of primordial isotopes ==
An even number of protons or neutrons is more stable (higher binding energy) because of pairing effects, so even–even nuclides are much more stable than odd–odd. One effect is that there are few stable odd–odd nuclides: in fact only five are stable, with another four having half-lives longer than a billion years.

Another effect is to prevent beta decay of many even–even nuclides into another even–even nuclide of the same mass number but lower energy, because decay proceeding one step at a time would have to pass through an odd–odd nuclide of higher energy. (Double beta decay directly from even–even to even–even, skipping over an odd-odd nuclide, is possible, but is so strongly hindered that known cases have half-lives greater than 10^{8} times the age of the universe.) This makes for a larger number of stable even–even nuclides, up to three for some mass numbers, up to seven for some atomic (proton) numbers, with at least four for all stable even-Z elements beyond argon.

Since nuclei with odd numbers of protons are relatively less stable, odd-numbered elements tend to have fewer stable isotopes. Of the 26 monoisotopic elements (those with exactly one stable isotope), all but one have an odd atomic number—the single exception being beryllium. In addition, no odd-numbered element has more than two stable isotopes, while every even-numbered element heavier than carbon with stable isotopes has at least three. Only a single odd-numbered element, potassium, has three primordial isotopes and none more than that.

== Tables ==
The following tables give the elements with primordial nuclides (half-life of most stable isotope > 10^{8} years). A list of nuclides sorted by half-life is found instead at List of nuclides.

The tables of elements are sorted by decreasing number of nuclides per element. Stable and unstable nuclides are given, with symbols for the unstable ones in italics. All the primordial isotopes of each element are given in order of decreasing abundance on Earth, regardless of stability. (Note: There are unstable isotopes with extremely long half-lives that are also found on Earth, and some of them are even more abundant than all the stable isotopes of a given element (for example, beta-active ^{187}Re is twice as abundant as stable ^{185}Re). Also, a bigger natural abundance of an isotope just implies that its formation was favored by the stellar nucleosynthesis process that produced the matter now constituting the Earth (and, of course, the rest of the Solar System) (see also Formation and evolution of the Solar System). In the case of argon the cosmically rarer ^{40}Ar dominates on Earth over ^{36}Ar as argon is too volatile to have been retained in the early proto-atmosphere of Earth while ^{40}Ar is a decay product of long-lived and non-volatile ^{40}K. Most argon in Earth's atmosphere is a product of potassium-40 decay. Most argon in the universe is not. At the present time 0.012% (120 ppm) of potassium on Earth is ^{40}K. Taking the age of Earth and the half-life of ^{40}K (1.248 billion years), this ratio was approximately an order of magnitude higher when the planet first formed. About 10.72% of that since-decayed ^{40}K produced ^{40}Ar, the rest having decayed to ^{40}Ca.) By convention, nuclides are counted as "stable" if they have never been observed to decay by experiment or from observation of decay products (so that nuclides unstable in theory, such as tantalum-180m, are counted as stable).

The first table is for even-atomic numbered elements, which tend to have far more primordial nuclides, due to the stability conferred by proton pairing. A second separate table is given for odd-atomic numbered elements, which tend to have far fewer stable and long-lived nuclides.

Primordial isotopes (in order of decreasing abundance on Earth) of even-Z elements
Z	Element	Stable	Decays	unstable in bold odd neutron number in pink									
50	tin	10	—	^{120}Sn	^{118}Sn	^{116}Sn	^{119}Sn	^{117}Sn	^{124}Sn	^{122}Sn	^{112}Sn	^{114}Sn	^{115}Sn
54	xenon	7	2	^{132}Xe	^{129}Xe	^{131}Xe	^{134}Xe	**^{136}Xe**	^{130}Xe	^{128}Xe	**^{124}Xe**	^{126}Xe	
48	cadmium	6	2	^{114}Cd	^{112}Cd	^{111}Cd	^{110}Cd	**^{113}Cd**	**^{116}Cd**	^{106}Cd	^{108}Cd		
52	tellurium	6	2	**^{130}Te**	**^{128}Te**	^{126}Te	^{125}Te	^{124}Te	^{122}Te	^{123}Te	^{120}Te		
44	ruthenium	7	—	^{102}Ru	^{104}Ru	^{101}Ru	^{99}Ru	^{100}Ru	^{96}Ru	^{98}Ru			
66	dysprosium	7	—	^{164}Dy	^{162}Dy	^{163}Dy	^{161}Dy	^{160}Dy	^{158}Dy	^{156}Dy			
70	ytterbium	7	—	^{174}Yb	^{172}Yb	^{173}Yb	^{171}Yb	^{176}Yb	^{170}Yb	^{168}Yb			
80	mercury	7	—	^{202}Hg	^{200}Hg	^{199}Hg	^{201}Hg	^{198}Hg	^{204}Hg	^{196}Hg			
42	molybdenum	6	1	^{98}Mo	^{96}Mo	^{95}Mo	^{92}Mo	**^{100}Mo**	^{97}Mo	^{94}Mo			
56	barium	6	1	^{138}Ba	^{137}Ba	^{136}Ba	^{135}Ba	^{134}Ba	^{132}Ba	**^{130}Ba**			
64	gadolinium	6	1	^{158}Gd	^{160}Gd	^{156}Gd	^{157}Gd	^{155}Gd	^{154}Gd	**^{152}Gd**			
60	neodymium	5	2	^{142}Nd	**^{144}Nd**	^{146}Nd	^{143}Nd	^{145}Nd	^{148}Nd	**^{150}Nd**			
62	samarium	5	2	^{152}Sm	^{154}Sm	**^{147}Sm**	^{149}Sm	**^{148}Sm**	^{150}Sm	^{144}Sm			
76	osmium	5	2	^{192}Os	^{190}Os	^{189}Os	^{188}Os	^{187}Os	**^{186}Os**	**^{184}Os**			
46	palladium	6	—	^{106}Pd	^{108}Pd	^{105}Pd	^{110}Pd	^{104}Pd	^{102}Pd				
68	erbium	6	—	^{166}Er	^{168}Er	^{167}Er	^{170}Er	^{164}Er	^{162}Er				
20	calcium	5	1	^{40}Ca	^{44}Ca	^{42}Ca	**^{48}Ca**	^{43}Ca	^{46}Ca				
34	selenium	5	1	^{80}Se	^{78}Se	^{76}Se	**^{82}Se**	^{77}Se	^{74}Se				
36	krypton	5	1	^{84}Kr	^{86}Kr	^{82}Kr	^{83}Kr	^{80}Kr	**^{78}Kr**				
72	hafnium	5	1	^{180}Hf	^{178}Hf	^{177}Hf	^{179}Hf	^{176}Hf	**^{174}Hf**				
78	platinum	5	1	^{195}Pt	^{194}Pt	^{196}Pt	^{198}Pt	^{192}Pt	**^{190}Pt**				
22	titanium	5	—	^{48}Ti	^{46}Ti	^{47}Ti	^{49}Ti	^{50}Ti					
28	nickel	5	—	^{58}Ni	^{60}Ni	^{62}Ni	^{61}Ni	^{64}Ni					
30	zinc	5	—	^{64}Zn	^{66}Zn	^{68}Zn	^{67}Zn	^{70}Zn					
32	germanium	4	1	^{74}Ge	^{72}Ge	^{70}Ge	^{73}Ge	**^{76}Ge**					
40	zirconium	4	1	^{90}Zr	^{94}Zr	^{92}Zr	^{91}Zr	**^{96}Zr**					
74	tungsten	4	1	^{184}W	^{186}W	^{182}W	^{183}W	**^{180}W**					
16	sulfur	4	—	^{32}S	^{34}S	^{33}S	^{36}S						
24	chromium	4	—	^{52}Cr	^{53}Cr	^{50}Cr	^{54}Cr						
26	iron	4	—	^{56}Fe	^{54}Fe	^{57}Fe	^{58}Fe						
38	strontium	4	—	^{88}Sr	^{86}Sr	^{87}Sr	^{84}Sr						
58	cerium	4	—	^{140}Ce	^{142}Ce	^{138}Ce	^{136}Ce						
82	lead	4	—	^{208}Pb	^{206}Pb	^{207}Pb	^{204}Pb						
8	oxygen	3	—	^{16}O	^{18}O	^{17}O							
10	neon	3	—	^{20}Ne	^{22}Ne	^{21}Ne							
12	magnesium	3	—	^{24}Mg	^{26}Mg	^{25}Mg							
14	silicon	3	—	^{28}Si	^{29}Si	^{30}Si							
18	argon	3	—	^{40}Ar	^{36}Ar	^{38}Ar							
2	helium	2	—	^{4}He	^{3}He								
6	carbon	2	—	^{12}C	^{13}C								
92	uranium	0	2	**^{238}U**	**^{235}U**								
4	beryllium	1	—	^{9}Be									
90	thorium	0	1	**^{232}Th**									

Primordial isotopes of odd-Z elements
Z	Element	Stable	Decays	unstable in bold odd neutron number in pink		
19	potassium	2	1	^{39}K	^{41}K	**^{40}K**
1	hydrogen	2	—	^{1}H	^{2}H	
3	lithium	2	—	^{7}Li	^{6}Li	
5	boron	2	—	^{11}B	^{10}B	
7	nitrogen	2	—	^{14}N	^{15}N	
17	chlorine	2	—	^{35}Cl	^{37}Cl	
29	copper	2	—	^{63}Cu	^{65}Cu	
31	gallium	2	—	^{69}Ga	^{71}Ga	
35	bromine	2	—	^{79}Br	^{81}Br	
47	silver	2	—	^{107}Ag	^{109}Ag	
51	antimony	2	—	^{121}Sb	^{123}Sb	
73	tantalum	2	—	^{181}Ta	^{180m}Ta	
77	iridium	2	—	^{193}Ir	^{191}Ir	
81	thallium	2	—	^{205}Tl	^{203}Tl	
23	vanadium	1	1	^{51}V	**^{50}V**	
37	rubidium	1	1	^{85}Rb	**^{87}Rb**	
49	indium	1	1	**^{115}In**	^{113}In	
57	lanthanum	1	1	^{139}La	**^{138}La**	
63	europium	1	1	^{153}Eu	**^{151}Eu**	
71	lutetium	1	1	^{175}Lu	**^{176}Lu**	
75	rhenium	1	1	**^{187}Re**	^{185}Re	
9	fluorine	1	—	^{19}F		
11	sodium	1	—	^{23}Na		
13	aluminium	1	—	^{27}Al		
15	phosphorus	1	—	^{31}P		
21	scandium	1	—	^{45}Sc		
25	manganese	1	—	^{55}Mn		
27	cobalt	1	—	^{59}Co		
33	arsenic	1	—	^{75}As		
39	yttrium	1	—	^{89}Y		
41	niobium	1	—	^{93}Nb		
45	rhodium	1	—	^{103}Rh		
53	iodine	1	—	^{127}I		
55	caesium	1	—	^{133}Cs		
59	praseodymium	1	—	^{141}Pr		
65	terbium	1	—	^{159}Tb		
67	holmium	1	—	^{165}Ho		
69	thulium	1	—	^{169}Tm		
79	gold	1	—	^{197}Au		
83	bismuth	0	1	**^{209}Bi**		

== Elements with no primordial isotopes ==
No primordial isotopes
Z	Element	Longest-lived isotope	
Z	Element	t^{1/2} (Note: Legend: yr=year, d=day, h=hour, min=minute, s=second.)	Symbol
94	plutonium	8.13×10^{7} yr	^{244}Pu
96	curium	1.56×10^{7} yr	^{247}Cm
43	technetium	4.21×10^{6} yr	^{97}Tc
93	neptunium	2.14×10^{6} yr	^{237}Np
91	protactinium	3.27×10^{4} yr	^{231}Pa
95	americium	7.35×10^{3} yr	^{243}Am
88	radium	1.60×10^{3} yr	^{226}Ra
97	berkelium	1.38×10^{3} yr	^{247}Bk
98	californium	900 yr	^{251}Cf
84	polonium	124 yr	^{209}Po
89	actinium	21.772 yr	^{227}Ac
61	promethium	17.7 yr	^{145}Pm
99	einsteinium	1.293 yr	^{252}Es
100	fermium	100.5 d	^{257}Fm
101	mendelevium	51.6 d	^{258}Md
86	radon	3.823 d	^{222}Rn
105	dubnium	16 h	^{268}Db
103	lawrencium	11 h	^{266}Lr
85	astatine	8.1 h	^{210}At
102	nobelium	58 min	^{259}No
104	rutherfordium	48 min	^{267}Rf
87	francium	22 min	^{223}Fr
106	seaborgium	14 min	^{269}Sg
107	bohrium	2.4 min	^{270}Bh
111	roentgenium	1.7 min	^{282}Rg
112	copernicium	28 s	^{285}Cn
108	hassium	16 s	^{269}Hs
110	darmstadtium	12.7 s	^{281}Ds
113	nihonium	9.5 s	^{286}Nh
109	meitnerium	4.5 s	^{278}Mt
114	flerovium	1.9 s	^{289}Fl
115	moscovium	650 ms	^{290}Mc
116	livermorium	57 ms	^{293}Lv
117	tennessine	51 ms	^{294}Ts
118	oganesson	690 μs	^{294}Og

Periodic table with elements colored according to the half-life of their most stable isotope.

== See also ==
- Island of stability
- Isotope § Nuclear properties and stability
- List of nuclides
- List of radioactive nuclides by half-life
- Primordial nuclide
- Stable nuclide
- Stable isotope ratio
- Table of nuclides
