= Even and odd atomic nuclei =

Nuclear physics classification method

In nuclear physics, properties of a nucleus depend on evenness or oddness of its atomic number (proton number) Z, neutron number N and, consequently, of their sum, the mass number A. Most importantly, oddness of both Z and N tends to lower the nuclear binding energy, making odd nuclei generally less stable. This effect is not only experimentally observed, but is included in the semi-empirical mass formula and explained by some other nuclear models, such as the nuclear shell model. This difference of nuclear binding energy between neighbouring nuclei, especially of odd-A isobars, has important consequences for beta decay.

The nuclear spin is zero for even-Z, even-N nuclei, integer for all even-A nuclei, and odd half-integer for all odd-A nuclei.

Even vs. odd mass number (A).
| | Even | Odd | Total |
|---|---|---|---|
| Stable | 150 | 101 | 251 |
| Long-lived | 27 | 8 | 35 |
| All primordial | 177 | 109 | 286 |

The neutron–proton ratio is not the only factor affecting nuclear stability. Adding neutrons to isotopes can vary their nuclear spins and nuclear shapes, causing differences in neutron capture cross sections and gamma spectroscopy and nuclear magnetic resonance properties. If too many or too few neutrons are present with regard to the nuclear binding energy optimum, the nucleus becomes unstable and subject to certain types of nuclear decay. Unstable nuclides with a nonoptimal number of neutrons or protons decay by beta decay (including positron decay), electron capture, or other means, such as spontaneous fission and cluster decay.

Data on specific nuclides below is from NUBASE2020 unless otherwise stated. See also List of nuclides for a complete enumeration.

== Even mass number ==
Even-mass-number nuclides, which comprise 150/251 = ~60% of all stable nuclides, are bosons, i.e., they have integer spins. 145 of the 150 are even-proton, even-neutron (EE) nuclides, which necessarily have spin 0 because of pairing. The remainder of the stable bosonic nuclides are five odd-proton, odd-neutron stable nuclides (^{2}_{1}H, ^{6}_{3}Li, ^{10}_{5}B, ^{14}_{7}N and ^{180m}_{73}Ta), all having a non-zero integer spin.

=== Pairing effects ===
Even/odd Z, N (Hydrogen-1 is OE)
| p,n | EE | OO | EO | OE | Total |
|---|---|---|---|---|---|
| Stable | 145 | 5 | 53 | 48 | 251 |
| Long-lived | 23 | 4 | 3 | 5 | 35 |
| All primordial | 168 | 9 | 56 | 53 | 286 |

Beta decay of an even–even nucleus produces an odd–odd nucleus, and vice versa. An even number of protons or of neutrons are more stable (higher binding energy) because of pairing effects, so even–even nuclei are much more stable than odd–odd. One effect is that there are few stable odd–odd nuclides, but another effect is to prevent beta decay of many even–even nuclei into another even–even nucleus of the same mass number but lower energy, because decay proceeding one step at a time would have to pass through an odd–odd nucleus of higher energy. Double beta decay directly from even–even to even–even skipping over an odd–odd nuclide is only occasionally possible, and even then with a half-life more than a billion times the age of the universe. For example, the double beta emitter ^{116}Cd has a half-life of 2.69×10^{19} years. This makes for a larger number of stable even–even nuclides, with some mass numbers having two stable nuclides, and one element (atomic number), tin, having as many as seven.

For example, the extreme stability of helium-4 due to the double pairing (two protons, two neutrons, filling the lowest shell) prevents any nuclides containing five or eight nucleons from existing for long enough to serve as platforms for the buildup of heavier elements via nuclear fusion in Big Bang nucleosynthesis; only in stars is there enough time for this (see triple-alpha process). This is also the reason why ^{8}_{4}Be decays so quickly into two alpha particles, making beryllium the only even-numbered element that is monoisotopic.

=== Even–even (even proton, even neutron) ===
There are 145 stable even–even nuclides, forming ~58% of the 251 stable nuclides. There are also 23 primordial even–even nuclides currently known to be radioactive. As a result, many of the 41 even-numbered elements from 2 to 82 have many primordial isotopes. With 145 isotopes, they average 145/41 ~ 3.54 stable isotopes each. The lightest stable even–even isotope is ^{4}_{2}He and the heaviest is ^{208}_{82}Pb. These are also the lightest and heaviest known doubly magic nuclides. ^{208}_{82}Pb is the final decay product of ^{232}_{90}Th, a primordial radionuclide with an even proton and neutron number. ^{238}_{92}U is another such primordial radionuclide with a half-life of 4.463 billion years; these two, with their decay products, each produce nearly half the radioactive heat within the Earth.

All even–even nuclides have spin 0 in their ground state, due to the Pauli exclusion principle. (See the pairing effect for more details.)

=== Odd–odd (odd proton, odd neutron) ===
Only five stable nuclides contain both an odd number of protons and an odd number of neutrons. The first four "odd–odd" nuclides occur in light elements, for which changing a proton to a neutron or vice versa would lead to a very lopsided proton–neutron ratio (^{2}_{1}H, ^{6}_{3}Li, ^{10}_{5}B, and ^{14}_{7}N; spins 1, 1, 3, 1). All four of these isotopes have the same number of protons and neutrons, and they all have an odd number for their nuclear spin. The only other observationally stable odd–odd nuclide is ^{180m}_{73}Ta (spin 9), the only primordial nuclear isomer, which has not yet been observed to decay despite experimental attempts. Also, four long-lived radioactive odd–odd nuclides – ^{40}_{19}K (the most common radioisotope in the human body), ^{50}_{23}V, ^{138}_{57}La, and ^{176}_{71}Lu with spins 4, 6, 5, 7, respectively – occur naturally. As in the case of ^{180m}_{73}Ta decay of high spin nuclides by beta decay (including electron capture), gamma decay, or (to a lesser extent) internal conversion is greatly inhibited if the only decay possible between isobar nuclides (or in the case of ^{180m}_{73}Ta between nuclear isomers) involves a large change in spin, the "preferred" change of spin that is associated with rapid decay being 0 or 1 for beta decay and also 2 for gamma decay. This high-spin inhibition of decay is the cause of the five heavy stable or long-lived odd-proton, odd-neutron nuclides discussed above. For an example of this effect where the spin effect is subtracted, tantalum-180, the odd–odd low-spin (theoretical) decay product of primordial tantalum-180m, itself has a half-life of only 8.15 hours.

Many odd–odd radionuclides (like the ground state of tantalum-180) with comparatively short half-lives are known. These almost always decay by positive or negative beta decay, in order to produce stable even–even isotopes which have paired protons and paired neutrons. In some odd–odd radionuclides where the ratio of protons to neutrons is near the line of stability, this decay can proceed in either direction, turning a proton into a neutron, or vice versa. An example is ^{64}_{29}Cu, which can decay by positron emission or electron capture to ^{64}_{28}Ni or by electron emission to ^{64}_{30}Zn.

Of the nine primordial odd–odd nuclides (five stable and four radioactive), only ^{14}_{7}N is the most common isotope of a common element. This is because proton capture on ^{14}_{7}N is the rate-limiting step of the CNO-I cycle. ^{6}_{3}Li and ^{10}_{5}B are minority isotopes of elements that are themselves rare compared to other light elements, while the other six isotopes make up only a tiny percentage of the natural abundance of their elements. For example, ^{180m}_{73}Ta is thought to be the rarest of all the stable nuclides.

No primordial odd–odd nuclide has spin 0 in the ground state. This is because the single unpaired neutron and unpaired proton have a larger nuclear force attraction to each other if their spins are aligned (producing a total spin of at least 1 unit), instead of anti-aligned. See deuterium for the simplest case of this nuclear behavior.

== Odd mass number ==
For a given odd mass number, there is exactly one beta-stable nuclide. There is not a difference in binding energy between even–odd and odd–even comparable to that between even–even and odd–odd, leaving other nuclides of the same mass number (isobars) free to beta decay toward the lowest-mass nuclide. For mass numbers of 147, 151, and 209+, the beta-stable isobar of that mass number has been observed to undergo alpha decay. (In theory, mass numbers 143 to 155, 160 to 162, and 165+ can also alpha decay.) This gives a total of 101 stable nuclides with odd mass numbers. There are another nine radioactive primordial nuclides with odd mass numbers.

Odd-mass-number nuclides are fermions, i.e., have half-integer spins. Generally speaking, since odd-mass-number nuclides always have an even number of either neutrons or protons, the even-numbered particles usually form part of a "core" in the nucleus with a spin of zero. The unpaired nucleon with the odd number (whether proton or neutron) is then responsible for the nuclear spin, which is the sum of the orbital angular momentum and spin angular momentum of the remaining nucleon.

The odd-mass number stable nuclides are divided (roughly evenly) into odd-proton–even-neutron, and odd-neutron–even-proton nuclides, which are more thoroughly discussed below.

=== Odd–even (odd proton, even neutron) ===
These 48 stable nuclides, stabilized by their even numbers of paired neutrons, form most of the stable isotopes of the odd-numbered elements; the very few odd–odd nuclides comprise the others. There are 41 odd-numbered elements with Z = 1 through 81, of which 30 (including hydrogen, since zero is an even number) have one stable odd–even isotope, the elements technetium (_{43}Tc) and promethium (_{61}Pm) have no stable isotopes, and nine elements: chlorine (_{17}Cl), potassium (_{19}K), copper (_{29}Cu), gallium (_{31}Ga), bromine (_{35}Br), silver (_{47}Ag), antimony (_{51}Sb), iridium (_{77}Ir), and thallium (_{81}Tl), have two odd–even stable isotopes each, for a total of 48 stable odd–even isotopes. The lightest example of this type of nuclide is ^{1}_{1}H (protium) while the heaviest example is ^{205}_{81}Tl. There are also five primordial radioactive odd–even isotopes, ^{87}_{37}Rb, ^{115}_{49}In, ^{187}_{75}Re, ^{151}_{63}Eu, and ^{209}_{83}Bi. The last two were only recently found to undergo alpha decay, and have half-lives greater than 10^{18} years.

=== Even–odd (even proton, odd neutron) ===
Even–odd long-lived
| | Decay | Half-life |
|---|---|---|
| ^{113}_{48}Cd | beta | 8.04×10^{15} a |
| ^{147}_{62}Sm | alpha | 1.066×10^{11} a |
| ^{235}_{92}U | alpha | 7.04×10^{8} a |

These 53 stable nuclides have an even number of protons and an odd number of neutrons. By definition, they are all isotopes of even-Z elements, where they are a minority in comparison to the even–even isotopes which are about 3 times as numerous. The exception is ^{9}_{4}Be, which is the only stable isotope of beryllium. Among the 41 even-Z elements that have a stable nuclide, only two elements (argon and cerium) have no even–odd stable nuclides. One element (tin) has three. There are 24 elements that have one even–odd nuclide and 13 that have two even–odd nuclides. The lightest example of this type of nuclide is ^{3}_{2}He and the heaviest is ^{207}_{82}Pb.

Of the 35 known primordial radionuclides there are three even–odd nuclides (see table at right), including the fissile ^{235}_{92}U. Because of their odd neutron numbers, the even–odd nuclides tend to have large neutron capture cross sections, due to the energy that results from neutron-pairing effects.

These stable even–odd nuclides tend to be less common in nature, generally because in order to form and contribute to the primordial abundance, they must have escaped capturing neutrons to form yet other stable even–even isotopes, and are thus dispreferred during the s-process of nucleosynthesis in stars. For this reason, only ^{195}_{78}Pt (an almost wholly r-process element) and ^{9}_{4}Be are the most naturally abundant isotopes of their element, the former only by a small margin, and the latter only because the expected beryllium-8 has lower binding energy than two alpha particles and therefore immediately alpha decays.

== Odd neutron number ==
Neutron number parity
| N | Even | Odd |
|---|---|---|
| Stable | 193 | 58 |
| Long-lived | 27 | 7 |
| All primordial | 220 | 65 |

Actinides with odd neutron numbers are generally fissile (with thermal neutrons), while those with even neutron numbers are generally not, though they are fissionable with fast neutrons. Only ^{9}_{4}Be, ^{14}_{7}N, and ^{195}_{78}Pt have an odd neutron number and are the most naturally abundant isotopes of their element.
