= Beta-decay stable isobars =

Set of nuclides that cannot undergo beta decay

Beta-decay stable isobars are the set of nuclides which cannot undergo beta decay, that is, the transformation of a neutron to a proton or a proton to a neutron within the nucleus. A subset of these nuclides are also stable with regard to double beta decay or theoretically higher simultaneous beta decay, as they have the lowest energy of all isobars with the same mass number.

This set of nuclides is also known as the line of beta stability, a term already in common use in 1965. This line lies along the bottom of the nuclear valley of stability.

== Definition ==
The line of beta stability can be defined mathematically by finding the nuclide with the greatest binding energy for a given mass number, by a model such as the classical semi-empirical mass formula developed by C. F. Weizsäcker. These nuclides are local maxima in terms of binding energy for a given mass number.

β decay stable / even A
βDS	One	Two	Three
2–34	17		
36–58	6	6	
60–72	5	2	
74–116	2	20	
118–154	2	12	5
156–192	5	14	
194–210	6	3	
212–262	7	19	
Total	50	76	5

Each family of isobars has only up to three beta-stable nuclides. Each with an odd mass number has only one beta-stable nuclide. Among even mass number, five (124, 130, 136, 150, 154) have three beta-stable nuclides. None have more than three; all others have either one or two.

- From 2 to 34, all have only one.
- From 36 to 72, only eight (36, 40, 46, 50, 54, 58, 64, 70) have two, and the remaining 11 have one.
- From 74 to 122, three (88, 90, 118) have one, and the remaining 22 have two.
- From 124 to 154, only one (140) has one, five have three, and the remaining 10 have two.
- From 156 to 262, only eighteen have one, and the remaining 36 have two, though there may also exist some undiscovered ones.

All primordial nuclides are beta decay stable, with the exception of ^{40}K, ^{50}V, ^{87}Rb, ^{113}Cd, ^{115}In, ^{138}La, ^{176}Lu, and ^{187}Re. In addition, ^{123}Te and ^{180m}Ta have not been observed to decay, but are believed to undergo beta decay with extremely long half-lives (over 10^{15} years). Theoretically, ^{123}Te can only undergo electron capture to ^{123}Sb, whereas ^{180m}Ta can decay in both directions, to ^{180}Hf or ^{180}W. Among non-primordial nuclides, there are some other cases of theoretically possible but never-observed beta decay, notably including ^{222}Rn and ^{247}Cm (the most stable isotopes of their elements considering all decay modes). Finally, ^{48}Ca has not been observed to undergo beta decay (theoretically possible) which is extremely suppressed, but double beta decay has been observed. Similar suppression of single beta decay occurs also for ^{148}Gd, a rather short-lived alpha emitter; and also for ^{96}Zr, where single beta decay is again possible, but suppressed to the point that it has a half-life an order of magnitude longer than the double beta decay.

All elements up to and including nobelium, except technetium, promethium, and mendelevium, are known to have at least one beta-stable isotope. It is known that technetium and promethium have no beta-stable isotopes; current measurement uncertainties are not enough to say whether mendelevium has them or not.

== List of known beta-decay stable isobars ==
346 nuclides (including ^{260}Fm whose discovery is unconfirmed) have been definitively identified as beta-stable. Theoretically predicted or experimentally observed double beta decay is shown by arrows, i.e. arrows point toward the lightest-mass isobar. This is sometimes dominated by alpha decay or spontaneous fission, especially for the heavy elements. Observed decay modes are listed as α for alpha decay, SF for spontaneous fission, and n for neutron emission in the special case of ^{5}He. For mass 5 there are no bound isobars at all; mass 8 has bound isobars, but the beta-stable ^{8}Be is unbound.

Two beta-decay stable nuclides exist for odd neutron numbers 1 (^{2}H and ^{3}He), 3 (^{5}He and ^{6}Li – the former has an extremely short half-life), 5 (^{9}Be and ^{10}B), 7 (^{13}C and ^{14}N), 55 (^{97}Mo and ^{99}Ru), and 85 (^{145}Nd and ^{147}Sm); the first four cases involve very light nuclides where odd-odd nuclides are more stable than their surrounding even-even isobars, and the last two surround the proton numbers 43 and 61 which have no beta-stable isotopes. Also, two beta-decay stable nuclides exist for odd proton numbers 1, 3, 5, 7, 17, 19, 29, 31, 35, 47, 51, 63, 77, 81, and 95; the first four cases involve very light nuclides where odd-odd nuclides are more stable than their surrounding even-even isobars, and the other numbers surround the neutron numbers 19, 21, 35, 39, 45, 61, 71, 89, 115, 123, 147 which have no beta-stable isotopes. (For N = 21 the long-lived primordial ^{40}K exists, and for N = 71 there is ^{123}Te whose electron capture has not yet been observed, but neither are beta-stable.)

All even proton numbers 2 ≤ Z ≤ 102 have at least two beta-decay stable nuclides, with exactly two for Z = 4 (^{8}Be and ^{9}Be – the former having an extremely short half-life) and 6 (^{12}C and ^{13}C). Also, the only even neutron numbers with only one beta-decay stable nuclide are 0 (^{1}H) and 2 (^{4}He); at least two beta-decay stable nuclides exist for even neutron numbers in the range 4 ≤ N ≤ 160, with exactly two for N = 4 (^{7}Li and ^{8}Be), 6 (^{11}B and ^{12}C), 8 (^{15}N and ^{16}O), 66 (^{114}Cd and ^{116}Sn, noting also primordial but not beta-stable ^{115}In), 120 (^{198}Pt and ^{200}Hg), and 128 (^{212}Po and ^{214}Rn – both very unstable to alpha decay). Seven beta-decay stable nuclides exist for the magic N = 82 (Note: ^{136}Xe, ^{138}Ba, ^{139}La, ^{140}Ce, ^{141}Pr, ^{142}Nd, and ^{144}Sm) and five for N = 20 (Note: ^{36}S, ^{37}Cl, ^{38}Ar, ^{39}K, and ^{40}Ca), 50 (Note: ^{86}Kr, ^{88}Sr, ^{89}Y, ^{90}Zr, and ^{92}Mo, noting also primordial but not beta-stable ^{87}Rb), 58 (Note: ^{100}Mo, ^{102}Ru, ^{103}Rh, ^{104}Pd, and ^{106}Cd), 74 (Note: ^{124}Sn, ^{126}Te, ^{127}I, ^{128}Xe, and ^{130}Ba), 78 (Note: ^{130}Te, ^{132}Xe, ^{133}Cs, ^{134}Ba, and ^{136}Ce), 88 (Note: ^{148}Nd, ^{150}Sm, ^{151}Eu, ^{152}Gd, and ^{154}Dy – the last not primordial), and 90 (Note: ^{150}Nd, ^{152}Sm, ^{153}Eu, ^{154}Gd, and ^{156}Dy).

For A ≤ 209, the only beta-decay stable nuclides that are not primordial nuclides are ^{5}He, ^{8}Be, ^{146}Sm, ^{150}Gd, and ^{154}Dy. (^{146}Sm has a half-life long enough that it should barely survive as a primordial nuclide, but it has never been experimentally confirmed as such.) All beta-decay stable nuclides with A ≥ 209 are known to undergo alpha decay, though for some, spontaneous fission is the dominant decay mode. Cluster decay is sometimes also possible, but in all known cases it is a minor branch compared to alpha decay or spontaneous fission. Alpha decay is energetically possible for all beta-stable nuclides with A ≥ 165 with the single exception of ^{204}Hg, but in most cases the Q-value is small enough that such decay has never been seen.

With the exception of ^{262}No, no nuclides with A > 260 are currently known to be beta-stable. Moreover, the known beta-stable nuclei for individual masses A = 222, A = 256, and A ≥ 258 (corresponding to proton numbers Z = 86 and Z ≥ 98, or to neutron numbers N = 136 and N ≥ 158) may not represent the complete set.

	Even N	Odd N
Even Z	Even A	Odd A
Odd Z	Odd A	Even A

All known beta-decay stable isobars sorted by mass number
Odd A	Even A	Odd A	Even A	Odd A	Even A	Odd A	Even A
^{1}H	^{2}H	^{3}He	^{4}He	^{5}He (n)	^{6}Li	^{7}Li	^{8}Be (α)
^{9}Be	^{10}B	^{11}B	^{12}C	^{13}C	^{14}N	^{15}N	^{16}O
^{17}O	^{18}O	^{19}F	^{20}Ne	^{21}Ne	^{22}Ne	^{23}Na	^{24}Mg
^{25}Mg	^{26}Mg	^{27}Al	^{28}Si	^{29}Si	^{30}Si	^{31}P	^{32}S
^{33}S	^{34}S	^{35}Cl	^{36}S ← ^{36}Ar	^{37}Cl	^{38}Ar	^{39}K	^{40}Ar ← ^{40}Ca
^{41}K	^{42}Ca	^{43}Ca	^{44}Ca	^{45}Sc	^{46}Ca → ^{46}Ti	^{47}Ti	^{48}Ti (Note: ^{48}Ca is theoretically capable of beta decay to ^{48}Sc, thus making it not a beta-stable nuclide. However, such a process has never been observed, having a partial half-life greater than 1.1^{+0.8}_{−0.6}×10^{21} years, longer than its double beta decay half-life, meaning that double beta decay would usually occur first.)
^{49}Ti	^{50}Ti ← ^{50}Cr	^{51}V	^{52}Cr	^{53}Cr	^{54}Cr ← ^{54}Fe	^{55}Mn	^{56}Fe
^{57}Fe	^{58}Fe ← ^{58}Ni	^{59}Co	^{60}Ni	^{61}Ni	^{62}Ni	^{63}Cu	^{64}Ni ← ^{64}Zn
^{65}Cu	^{66}Zn	^{67}Zn	^{68}Zn	^{69}Ga	^{70}Zn → ^{70}Ge	^{71}Ga	^{72}Ge
^{73}Ge	^{74}Ge ← ^{74}Se	^{75}As	^{76}Ge → ^{76}Se	^{77}Se	^{78}Se ← ^{78}Kr	^{79}Br	^{80}Se → ^{80}Kr
^{81}Br	^{82}Se → ^{82}Kr	^{83}Kr	^{84}Kr ← ^{84}Sr	^{85}Rb	^{86}Kr → ^{86}Sr	^{87}Sr	^{88}Sr
^{89}Y	^{90}Zr	^{91}Zr	^{92}Zr ← ^{92}Mo	^{93}Nb	^{94}Zr → ^{94}Mo	^{95}Mo	^{96}Mo ← ^{96}Ru (Note: ^{96}Zr is capable of beta decay to ^{96}Nb, thus making it not a beta-stable nuclide. However, the process has a partial half-life greater than the double beta decay, so double beta decay usually occurs first.)
^{97}Mo	^{98}Mo → ^{98}Ru	^{99}Ru	^{100}Mo → ^{100}Ru	^{101}Ru	^{102}Ru ← ^{102}Pd	^{103}Rh	^{104}Ru → ^{104}Pd
^{105}Pd	^{106}Pd ← ^{106}Cd	^{107}Ag	^{108}Pd ← ^{108}Cd	^{109}Ag	^{110}Pd → ^{110}Cd	^{111}Cd	^{112}Cd ← ^{112}Sn
^{113}In	^{114}Cd → ^{114}Sn	^{115}Sn	^{116}Cd → ^{116}Sn	^{117}Sn	^{118}Sn	^{119}Sn	^{120}Sn ← ^{120}Te
^{121}Sb	^{122}Sn → ^{122}Te	^{123}Sb	^{124}Sn → ^{124}Te ← ^{124}Xe	^{125}Te	^{126}Te ← ^{126}Xe	^{127}I	^{128}Te → ^{128}Xe
^{129}Xe	^{130}Te → ^{130}Xe ← ^{130}Ba	^{131}Xe	^{132}Xe ← ^{132}Ba	^{133}Cs	^{134}Xe → ^{134}Ba	^{135}Ba	^{136}Xe → ^{136}Ba ← ^{136}Ce
^{137}Ba	^{138}Ba ← ^{138}Ce	^{139}La	^{140}Ce	^{141}Pr	^{142}Ce → ^{142}Nd	^{143}Nd	^{144}Nd (α) ← ^{144}Sm
^{145}Nd	^{146}Nd → ^{146}Sm (α)	^{147}Sm (α)	^{148}Nd → ^{148}Sm (α) (Note: ^{148}Gd was previously thought to be a third beta-stable isobar for mass 148, but according to current mass determinations it has a higher mass than ^{148}Eu and can undergo electron capture. Nevertheless, the mass difference is very small (27.0 keV, even lower than likewise unseen electron capture of ^{123}Te), and only alpha decay has been observed experimentally for ^{148}Gd.)	^{149}Sm	^{150}Nd → ^{150}Sm ← ^{150}Gd (α)	^{151}Eu (α)	^{152}Sm ← ^{152}Gd (α)
^{153}Eu	^{154}Sm → ^{154}Gd ← ^{154}Dy (α)	^{155}Gd	^{156}Gd ← ^{156}Dy	^{157}Gd	^{158}Gd ← ^{158}Dy	^{159}Tb	^{160}Gd → ^{160}Dy
^{161}Dy	^{162}Dy ← ^{162}Er	^{163}Dy	^{164}Dy ← ^{164}Er	^{165}Ho	^{166}Er	^{167}Er	^{168}Er ← ^{168}Yb
^{169}Tm	^{170}Er → ^{170}Yb	^{171}Yb	^{172}Yb	^{173}Yb	^{174}Yb ← ^{174}Hf (α)	^{175}Lu	^{176}Yb → ^{176}Hf
^{177}Hf	^{178}Hf	^{179}Hf	^{180}Hf ← ^{180}W (α)	^{181}Ta	^{182}W	^{183}W	^{184}W ← ^{184}Os (α)
^{185}Re	^{186}W → ^{186}Os (α)	^{187}Os	^{188}Os	^{189}Os	^{190}Os ← ^{190}Pt (α)	^{191}Ir	^{192}Os → ^{192}Pt
^{193}Ir	^{194}Pt	^{195}Pt	^{196}Pt ← ^{196}Hg	^{197}Au	^{198}Pt → ^{198}Hg	^{199}Hg	^{200}Hg
^{201}Hg	^{202}Hg	^{203}Tl	^{204}Hg → ^{204}Pb	^{205}Tl	^{206}Pb	^{207}Pb	^{208}Pb
^{209}Bi (α)	^{210}Po (α)	^{211}Po (α)	^{212}Po (α) ← ^{212}Rn (α)	^{213}Po (α)	^{214}Po (α) ← ^{214}Rn (α)	^{215}At (α)	^{216}Po (α) → ^{216}Rn (α)
^{217}Rn (α)	^{218}Rn (α) ← ^{218}Ra (α)	^{219}Fr (α)	^{220}Rn (α) → ^{220}Ra (α)	^{221}Ra (α)	^{222}Ra (Note: While the AME2020 atomic mass evaluation gives ^{222}Rn a lower mass than ^{222}Fr (the β^{−}-decay energy is given as (−6 ± 8) keV), implying beta-stability, it is predicted that single beta decay of ^{222}Rn is energetically possible (albeit with very low decay energy), and it falls within the error margin given in AME2020. Hence, current mass determinations cannot decisively determine whether ^{222}Rn is beta-stable or not, though only the alpha decay mode is experimentally known for that nuclide, and the search for beta decay yielded a lower partial half-life limit of 8 years.) (α)	^{223}Ra (α)	^{224}Ra (α) ← ^{224}Th (α)
^{225}Ac (α)	^{226}Ra (α) → ^{226}Th (α)	^{227}Th (α)	^{228}Th (α)	^{229}Th (α)	^{230}Th (α) ← ^{230}U (α)	^{231}Pa (α)	^{232}Th (α) → ^{232}U (α)
^{233}U (α)	^{234}U (α)	^{235}U (α)	^{236}U (α) ← ^{236}Pu (α)	^{237}Np (α)	^{238}U (α) → ^{238}Pu (α)	^{239}Pu (α)	^{240}Pu (α)
^{241}Am (α)	^{242}Pu (α) ← ^{242}Cm (α)	^{243}Am (α)	^{244}Pu (α) → ^{244}Cm (α)	^{245}Cm (α)	^{246}Cm (α)	^{247}Bk (α)	^{248}Cm (α) → ^{248}Cf (α)
^{249}Cf (α)	^{250}Cf (α)	^{251}Cf (α)	^{252}Cf (α) ← ^{252}Fm (α)	^{253}Es (α)	^{254}Cf (SF) → ^{254}Fm (α)	^{255}Fm (α)	^{256}Fm (Note: While the AME2020 atomic mass evaluation gives ^{256}Cf a lower mass than ^{256}Es (the β^{−}-decay energy is given as (−140# ± 330#) keV), implying beta-stability, the error margin between them is larger than the mass difference. Hence, current mass determinations cannot decisively determine whether ^{256}Cf is beta-stable or not.) (SF)
^{257}Fm (α)	^{258}Fm (SF) ← ^{258}No (SF)	(Note: While the AME2020 atomic mass evaluation gives ^{259}Md a lower mass than ^{259}Fm (the β^{+}-decay energy is given as (−140# ± 300#) keV), implying beta-stability, the error margin between them is larger than the mass difference. Hence, current mass determinations cannot decisively determine which one of ^{259}Fm and ^{259}Md is beta-stable.)	^{260}Fm (Note: Discovery of this nuclide is unconfirmed) (SF) → ^{260}No (SF)	(Note: There is no known beta-stable isobar for mass 261, although they are known for the surrounding masses 260 and 262. Various models suggest that one of the undiscovered ^{261}Md and ^{261}No should be beta-stable.)	^{262}No (SF) (Note: While the AME2020 atomic mass evaluation gives ^{262}Rf a higher mass than ^{262}Lr (the β^{+}-decay energy is given as (290# ± 300#) keV), implying non-beta-stability, the error margin between them is larger than the mass difference. Hence, current mass determinations cannot decisively determine whether ^{262}Rf is beta-stable or not.)		

One chart of known and predicted nuclides up to Z = 149, N = 256. Black denotes the predicted beta-stability line, which is in good agreement with experimental data, though it fails to predict that Tc and Pm have no beta-stable isotope (the mass differences causing these anomalies are small). Islands of stability are predicted to center near ^{294}Ds and ^{354}126, beyond which the model appears to deviate from several rules of the semi-empirical mass formula.

The general patterns of beta-stability are expected to continue into the region of superheavy elements, though the exact location of the center of the valley of stability is model dependent. It is widely believed that an island of stability exists along the beta-stability line for isotopes of elements around copernicium that are stabilized by shell closures in the region; such isotopes would decay primarily through alpha decay or spontaneous fission. Beyond the island of stability, various models that correctly predict many known beta-stable isotopes also predict anomalies in the beta-stability line that are unobserved in any known nuclides, such as the existence of two beta-stable nuclides with the same odd mass number. This is a consequence of the fact that a semi-empirical mass formula must consider shell correction and nuclear deformation, which become far more pronounced for heavy nuclides.

The beta-stable fully ionized nuclei (with all electrons stripped) are somewhat different. Firstly, if a proton-rich nuclide can only decay by electron capture (because the energy difference between the parent and daughter is less than 1.022 MeV, the amount of decay energy needed for positron emission), then full ionization makes decay impossible. This happens for example for ^{7}Be. Moreover, sometimes the energy difference is such that while β^{−} decay violates conservation of energy for a neutral atom, bound-state β^{−} decay (in which the decay electron remains bound to the daughter in an atomic orbital) is possible for the corresponding bare nucleus. Within the range 2 ≤ A ≤ 270, this means that:

- Among nuclides with odd mass number, ^{163}Dy, ^{193}Ir, ^{205}Tl, ^{213}Po, ^{215}At, and ^{243}Am which are beta-stable as neutral nuclides cease to be beta-stable as bare nuclides, and are replaced by their daughters ^{163}Ho, ^{193}Pt, ^{205}Pb, ^{213}At, ^{215}Rn, and ^{243}Cm.
- Among even-even nuclides, ^{148}Gd, ^{194}Hg, ^{202}Pb, and ^{246}Cf become beta-stable, while ^{222}Rn and ^{244}Pu are not. (Note: Bound-state beta decays for ^{148}Eu and ^{244}Pu involve fifth-forbidden transitions, so they should be negligible.)

Only bound-state β^{−} decay for ^{163}Dy and ^{205}Tl has been observed.

== Beta decay toward minimum mass ==
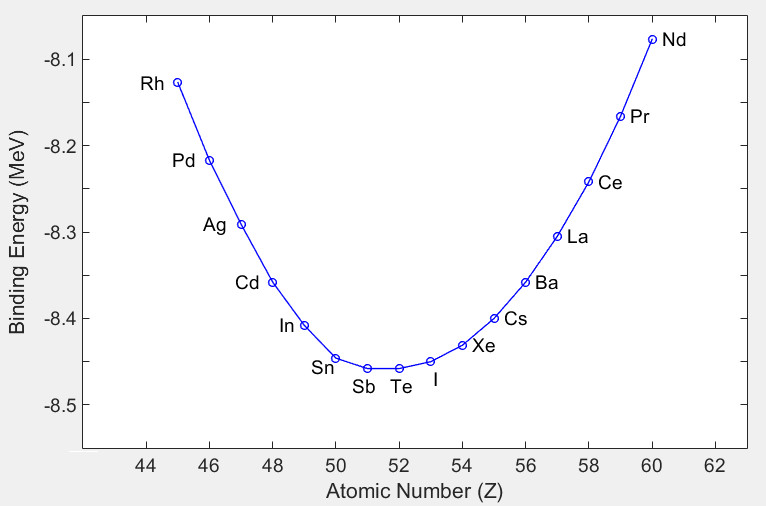
The negative of binding energy per nucleon for nuclides with atomic mass number 125 plotted as a function of atomic number. The profile of binding energy across the valley of stability is roughly a parabola. Tellurium-125 (_{52}Te) is stable, while antimony-125 (_{51}Sb) is unstable to β− decay. Nuclei up the walls decay toward the middle.

Beta decay generally causes nuclides to decay toward the isobar with the lowest mass (which is often, but not always, the one with highest binding energy) with the same mass number. Those with lower atomic number and higher neutron number than the minimum-mass isobar undergo beta-minus decay, while those with higher atomic number and lower neutron number undergo beta-plus decay or electron capture.

However, there are a few odd-odd nuclides between two beta-stable even-even isobars, that predominantly decay to the higher-mass of the two beta-stable isobars. For example, ^{40}K could either undergo electron capture or positron emission to ^{40}Ar, or undergo beta minus decay to ^{40}Ca: both possible products are beta-stable. The former process would produce the lighter of the two beta-stable isobars, yet the latter is more common.

	Nuclide	Mass	Nuclide	Mass	Nuclide	Mass
Parent	Cl-36	35.96830698	K-40	39.96399848	Ag-108	107.905956
Minority decay (β+/EC)	2% to S-36	35.96708076	10.72% to Ar-40	39.9623831225	3% to Pd-108	107.903892
Majority decay (β−)	98% to Ar-36	35.967545106	89.28% to Ca-40	39.96259098	97% to Cd-108	107.904184
	Nuclide	Mass	Nuclide	Mass	Nuclide	Mass
Parent	Eu-150m	149.919747	Eu-152m1	151.9217935	Am-242	242.0595474
Minority decay (β+/EC)	11% to Sm-150	149.9172755	28% to Sm-152	151.9197324	17.3% to Pu-242	242.0587426
Majority decay (β−)	89% to Gd-150	149.918659	72% to Gd-152	151.9197910	82.7% to Cm-242	242.0588358
	Nuclide	Mass	Nuclide	Mass	Nuclide	Mass
Parent	Pm-146	145.914696				
Minority decay (β−)	37% to Sm-146	145.913041				
Majority decay (β+/EC)	63% to Nd-146	145.9131169				

- Isotope masses from:
  - Kondev, F. G.; Wang, M.; Huang, W. J.; Naimi, S.; Audi, G. (2021). "The NUBASE2020 evaluation of nuclear properties" (PDF). Chinese Physics C. 45 (3) 030001. doi:10.1088/1674-1137/abddae.
