= Isotopes of promethium =

Isotopes of promethium (_{61}Pm)
Main isotopes			Decay	
Isotope	abundance	half-life (t_{1/2})	mode	product
^{143}Pm	synth	265 d	ε	^{143}Nd
^{144}Pm	synth	363 d	ε	^{144}Nd
^{145}Pm	synth	17.7 y	ε	^{145}Nd
^{145}Pm	synth	17.7 y	α	^{141}Pr
^{146}Pm	synth	5.53 y	ε	^{146}Nd
^{146}Pm	synth	5.53 y	β^{−}	^{146}Sm
^{147}Pm	trace	2.6234 y	β^{−}	^{147}Sm

Promethium (_{61}Pm) is an artificial element, except in trace quantities as a product of spontaneous fission of ^{238}U and ^{235}U and alpha decay of ^{151}Eu, and thus a standard atomic weight cannot be given. Like all artificial elements, it has no stable isotopes. It was first synthesized in 1945. Like technetium, it is preceded and followed by elements with stable isotopes.

The known isotopes run from ^{128}Pm to ^{166}Pm, 39 in all; the most stable are ^{145}Pm with a half-life of 17.7 years, ^{146}Pm with a half-life of 5.53 years, and ^{147}Pm (the common isotope) with a half-life of 2.6234 years. ^{143}Pm and ^{144}Pm also have lengthy if poorly-known lives on the order of a year, but all the others have half-lives that are less than six days, with the majority less than a few minutes. There are also 24 known meta states with the most stable being ^{148m}Pm at a half-life of 41.29 days.

The primary decay mode for isotopes lighter than ^{146}Pm is electron capture resulting in isotopes of neodymium, and the primary decay mode heavier than ^{146}Pm is beta decay giving isotopes of samarium; promethium-146 itself decays both ways.

== List of isotopes ==
Nuclide (Note: ^{m}Pm – Excited nuclear isomer.)	Z	N	Isotopic mass (Da) (Note: ( ) – Uncertainty (1σ) is given in concise form in parentheses after the corresponding last digits.) (Note: # – Atomic mass marked #: value and uncertainty derived not from purely experimental data, but at least partly from trends from the Mass Surface (TMS).)	Discovery year	Half-life (Note: # – Values marked # are not purely derived from experimental data, but at least partly from trends of neighboring nuclides (TNN).)	Decay mode (Note: Modes of decay: EC: / Electron capture; IT: / Isomeric transition; n: / Neutron emission; p: / Proton emission)	Daughter isotope (Note: Bold italics symbol as daughter – Daughter product is nearly stable.) (Note: Bold symbol as daughter – Daughter product is stable.)	Spin and parity (Note: ( ) spin value – Indicates spin with weak assignment arguments.)	Isotopic abundance
Nuclide	Excitation energy			Discovery year	Half-life	Decay mode	Daughter isotope	Spin and parity	Isotopic abundance
^{125}Pm	61	64		2025	>310 ns				
^{126}Pm	61	65	125.95733(54)#	2025	500# ms [>310 ns]				
^{127}Pm	61	66	126.95136(43)#	2025	1# s [>310 ns]			3/2+#	
^{128}Pm	61	67	127.94823(32)#	1999	1.0(3) s	β^{+} (?%)	^{128}Nd	4+#	
^{128}Pm	61	67	127.94823(32)#	1999	1.0(3) s	β^{+}, p (?%)	^{127}Pr	4+#	
^{129}Pm	61	68	128.94291(32)#	2004	2.4(9) s	β^{+}	^{129}Nd	5/2+#	
^{130}Pm	61	69	129.94045(22)#	1985	2.6(2) s	β^{+} (?%)	^{130}Nd	(5+, 6+, 4+)	
^{130}Pm	61	69	129.94045(22)#	1985	2.6(2) s	β^{+}, p (?%)	^{129}Pr	(5+, 6+, 4+)	
^{131}Pm	61	70	130.93583(22)#	1998	6.3(8) s	β^{+}	^{131}Nd	(11/2−)	
^{132}Pm	61	71	131.93384(16)#	1977	6.2(6) s	β^{+}	^{132}Nd	(3+)	
^{132}Pm	61	71	131.93384(16)#	1977	6.2(6) s	β^{+}, p (5×10^{−5}%)	^{131}Pr	(3+)	
^{133}Pm	61	72	132.929782(54)	1977	13.5(21) s	β^{+}	^{133}Nd	(3/2+)	
^{133m}Pm	129.7(7) keV			(1996) (Note: Half-life not measured, not included in discovery database)	8# s			(11/2−)	
^{134}Pm	61	73	133.928326(45)	1977	22(1) s	β^{+}	^{134}Nd	(5+)	
^{134m1}Pm	50(50)# keV (Note: Order of ground state and isomer is uncertain.)			1989	~5 s	β^{+}	^{134}Nd	(2+)	
^{134m2}Pm	120(50)# keV			2009	20(1) μs	IT	^{134}Pm	(7−)	
^{135}Pm	61	74	134.924785(89)	1975	49(3) s	β^{+}	^{135}Nd	(3/2+, 5/2+)	
^{135m}Pm	240(100)# keV			1989	40(3) s	β^{+}	^{135}Nd	(11/2−)	
^{136}Pm	61	75	135.923596(74)	1982	107(6) s	β^{+}	^{136}Nd	7+#	
^{136m1}Pm	100(120) keV			1988	90(35) s	β^{+}	^{136}Nd	2+#	
^{136m2}Pm	42.7(2) keV			2008	1.5(1) μs	IT	^{136}Pm	7−#	
^{137}Pm	61	76	136.920480(14)	1975	2# min			5/2−#	
^{137m}Pm	160(50) keV			(1973) (Note: Not clear that this is a different state from the ground state)	2.4(1) min	β^{+}	^{137}Nd	11/2−	
^{138}Pm	61	77	137.919576(12)	1981	3.24(5) min	β^{+}	^{138}Nd	3−#	
^{139}Pm	61	78	138.916799(15)	1967	4.15(5) min	β^{+}	^{139}Nd	(5/2)+	
^{139m}Pm	188.7(3) keV			1975	180(20) ms	IT	^{139}Pm	(11/2)−	
^{140}Pm	61	79	139.916036(26)	1966	9.2(2) s	β^{+}	^{140}Nd	1+	
^{140m}Pm	429(28) keV			1968	5.95(5) min	β^{+}	^{140}Nd	8−	
^{141}Pm	61	80	140.913555(15)	1952	20.90(5) min	β^{+}	^{141}Nd	5/2+	
^{141m1}Pm	628.62(7) keV			1975	630(20) ns	IT	^{141}Pm	11/2−	
^{141m2}Pm	2530.75(17) keV			1985	>2 μs	IT	^{141}Pm	(23/2+)	
^{142}Pm	61	81	141.912891(25)	1959	40.5(5) s	β^{+} (77.1%)	^{142}Nd	1+	
^{142}Pm	61	81	141.912891(25)	1959	40.5(5) s	EC (22.9%)	^{142}Nd	1+	
^{142m1}Pm	883.17(16) keV			1971	2.0(2) ms	IT	^{142}Pm	(8)−	
^{142m2}Pm	2828.7(6) keV			2004	67(5) μs	IT	^{142}Pm	(13−)	
^{143}Pm	61	82	142.9109381(32)	1952	265(7) d	EC	^{143}Nd	5/2+	
^{143}Pm	61	82	142.9109381(32)	1952	265(7) d	β^{+} (<5.7×10^{−6}%)	^{143}Nd	5/2+	
^{144}Pm	61	83	143.9125962(31)	1952	363(14) d	EC	^{144}Nd	5−	
^{144}Pm	61	83	143.9125962(31)	1952	363(14) d	β^{+} (<8×10^{−5}%)	^{144}Nd	5−	
^{144m1}Pm	840.90(5) keV			1976	780(200) ns	IT	^{144}Pm	(9)+	
^{144m2}Pm	8595.8(22) keV			1993	~2.7 μs	IT	^{144}Pm	(27+)	
^{145}Pm	61	84	144.9127557(30)	1951	17.7(4) y	EC	^{145}Nd	5/2+	
^{145}Pm	61	84	144.9127557(30)	1951	17.7(4) y	α (2.8×10^{−7}%)	^{141}Pr	5/2+	
^{146}Pm	61	85	145.9147022(46)	1960	5.53(5) y	EC (66.0%)	^{146}Nd	3−	
^{146}Pm	61	85	145.9147022(46)	1960	5.53(5) y	β^{−} (34.0%)	^{146}Sm	3−	
^{147}Pm (Note: Fission product)	61	86	146.9151449(14)	1947	2.6234(2) y	β^{−}	^{147}Sm	7/2+	Trace (Note: Spontaneous fission product of ^{232}Th, ^{235}U, ^{238}U and alpha decay daughter of primordial ^{151}Eu)
^{148}Pm	61	87	147.9174811(61)	1947	5.368(7) d	β^{−}	^{148}Sm	1−	
^{148m}Pm	137.9(3) keV			1952	41.29(11) d	β^{−} (95.8%)	^{148}Sm	5−, 6−	
^{148m}Pm	137.9(3) keV			1952	41.29(11) d	IT (4.2%)	^{148}Pm	5−, 6−	
^{149}Pm	61	88	148.9183415(23)	1947	53.08(5) h	β^{−}	^{149}Sm	7/2+	
^{149m}Pm	240.214(7) keV			1966	35(3) μs	IT	^{149}Pm	11/2−	
^{150}Pm	61	89	149.920990(22)	1952	2.698(15) h	β^{−}	^{150}Sm	(1−)	
^{151}Pm	61	90	150.9212166(49)	1952	28.40(4) h	β^{−}	^{151}Sm	5/2+	
^{152}Pm	61	91	151.923505(28)	1958	4.12(8) min	β^{−}	^{152}Sm	1+	
^{152m1}Pm	140(90) keV			1969	7.52(8) min	β^{−}	^{152}Sm	4(−)	
^{152m2}Pm	150+x keV			1971	13.8(2) min	β^{−} (≤100%)	^{152}Sm	(8)	
^{152m2}Pm	150+x keV			1971	13.8(2) min	IT (≥0%)	^{152}Pm	(8)	
^{153}Pm	61	92	152.9241563(97)	1962	5.25(2) min	β^{−}	^{153}Sm	5/2−	
^{154}Pm	61	93	153.926713(27)	1958	2.68(7) min	β^{−}	^{154}Sm	(4+)	
^{154m}Pm	−230(50) keV			1971	1.73(10) min	β^{−}	^{154}Sm	(1−)	
^{155}Pm	61	94	154.9281370(51)	1982	41.5(2) s	β^{−}	^{155}Sm	(5/2−)	
^{156}Pm	61	95	155.9311141(13)	1986	27.4(5) s	β^{−}	^{156}Sm	4+	
^{156m}Pm	150.30(10) keV			2007	2.3(20) s	IT (98%)	^{156}Pm	1+#	
^{156m}Pm	150.30(10) keV			2007	2.3(20) s	β^{−} (2%)	^{156}Sm	1+#	
^{157}Pm	61	96	156.9331213(75)	1987	10.56(10) s	β^{−}	^{157}Sm	(5/2−)	
^{158}Pm	61	97	157.93654695(95)	1987	4.8(5) s	β^{−}	^{158}Sm	(0+,1+)#	
^{158m}Pm	150(50)# keV			(2015) (Note: Half-life not measured, not included in discovery database)	>16 μs	IT	^{158}Pm	5+#	
^{159}Pm	61	98	158.939286(11)	2005	1.648+0.043 −0.042 s	β^{−}	^{159}Sm	(5/2−)	
^{159m}Pm	1465.0(5) keV			2021	4.42(17) μs	IT	^{159}Pm	17/2+#	
^{159m}Pm	1465.0(5) keV			2021	4.42(17) μs	β^{−}, n (<0.6%)	^{158}Sm	17/2+#	
^{160}Pm	61	99	159.9432153(22)	2012	874+16 −12 ms	β^{−}	^{160}Sm	6−#	
^{160}Pm	61	99	159.9432153(22)	2012	874+16 −12 ms	β^{−}, n (<0.1%)	^{159}Sm	6−#	
^{160m}Pm	191(11) keV			2020	>700 ms			1−#	
^{161}Pm	61	100	160.9462298(97)	2012	724+20 −12 ms	β^{−} (98.91%)	^{161}Sm	(5/2−)	
^{161}Pm	61	100	160.9462298(97)	2012	724+20 −12 ms	β^{−}, n (1.09%)	^{160}Sm	(5/2−)	
^{161m}Pm	965.9(9) keV			2021	890(90) ns	IT	^{161}Pm	(13/2+)	
^{162}Pm	61	101	161.95057(32)#	2012	467+38 −18 ms	β^{−} (98.21%)	^{162}Sm	2+#	
^{162}Pm	61	101	161.95057(32)#	2012	467+38 −18 ms	β^{−}, n (1.79%)	^{161}Sm	2+#	
^{163}Pm	61	102	162.95388(43)#	2012	362+42 −30 ms	β^{−} (95%)	^{163}Sm	5/2−#	
^{163}Pm	61	102	162.95388(43)#	2012	362+42 −30 ms	β^{−}, n (5.00%)	^{162}Sm	5/2−#	
^{164}Pm	61	103	163.95882(43)#	2018	280+38 −33 ms	β^{−} (93.82%)	^{164}Sm	5−#	
^{164}Pm	61	103	163.95882(43)#	2018	280+38 −33 ms	β^{−}, n (6.18%)	^{163}Sm	5−#	
^{165}Pm	61	104	164.96278(54)#	2018	297+111 −101 ms	β^{−} (86.74%)	^{165}Sm	5/2−#	
^{165}Pm	61	104	164.96278(54)#	2018	297+111 −101 ms	β^{−}, n (13.26%)	^{164}Sm	5/2−#	
^{166}Pm	61	105		2022	228+131 −112 ms	β^{−}	^{166}Sm		
^{166}Pm	61	105		2022	228+131 −112 ms	β^{−}, n (<52%)	^{165}Sm		
This table header & footer:

== Stability of promethium isotopes ==
Promethium is one of the two elements of the first 82 elements that has no stable isotopes. This is a rarely occurring effect of the liquid drop model. Namely, promethium does not have any beta-stable isotopes, as for any mass number, it is energetically favorable for a promethium isotope to undergo positron emission or beta decay, respectively forming a neodymium or samarium isotope which has a higher binding energy per nucleon. The other element for which this happens is technetium (Z = 43).

== Promethium-147 ==
Promethium-147 beta decays to the long-lived primordial radioisotope samarium-147 with a half-life of 2.6234 years, emitting low-energy beta radiation without gamma emission. It is a common fission product, produced in nuclear reactors and in trace quantities in nature, where it is also produced by the alpha decay of europium-151.

In the reactor environment, it is almost exclusively produced through beta decay of neodymium-147 as usual for fission products. The isotopes ^{142-146}Nd, ^{148}Nd, and ^{150}Nd are all stable with respect to beta decay, so the isotopes of promethium with those masses are not produced by beta decay and are therefore not significant fission products (as they could only be produced directly, rather than through a beta-decay chain). ^{149}Pm and ^{151}Pm are, but have half-lives of only 53.08 and 28.40 hours, so are not found in spent nuclear fuel that has been cooled for months or years.

Promethium-147 is used as a beta particle source and a radioisotope thermoelectric generator (RTG) fuel; its power density is about 2 watts per gram. Mixed with a phosphor, it was used to illuminate the Apollo Lunar Module electrical switch tips and the control panels of the Lunar Roving Vehicle. For luminescent applications, it has generally been replaced by tritium, which is even safer and has a longer half-life (12.32 years).

== See also ==
Daughter products other than promethium

- Isotopes of samarium
- Isotopes of neodymium
- Isotopes of praseodymium
