= Samarium-147 =

Isotope of samarium

General
- Symbol: ^{147}Sm
- Names: Samarium-147
- Protons (Z): 62
- Neutrons (N): 85

Nuclide data
- Natural abundance: 15.00%
- Half-life (t_{1/2}): 1.066×10^{11} years
- Isotope mass: 146.914898 Da
- Spin: 7/2−
- Parent isotopes: ^{147}Pm (β^{−})^{151}Gd (α)
- Decay products: ^{143}Nd

Decay modes
- Decay mode: Decay energy (MeV)
- α: 2.311

Samarium-147 (^{147}Sm or Sm-147) is an isotope of samarium, making up 15% of natural samarium. It is an extremely long-lived radioisotope, with a half-life of 1.066×10^{11} years, and an alpha emitter, the only significant one outside the heavy decay chains from thorium and uranium.

== Uses ==
Samarium-147 is used in samarium–neodymium dating. The method of isochron dating is used to find the date at which a rock (or group of rocks) are formed. The Sm-Nd isochron plots the ratio of radiogenic ^{143}Nd to non-radiogenic ^{144}Nd against the ratio of the parent isotope ^{147}Sm to the non-radiogenic isotope ^{144}Nd. ^{144}Nd is used to normalize the radiogenic isotope in the isochron because it is a slightly radioactive and relatively abundant neodymium isotope.

The Sm-Nd isochron is defined by the following equation:

$$\left(\frac{{}^{143}\mathrm{Nd}}{{}^{144}\mathrm{Nd}}\right)_{\mathrm{present}} = \left(\frac{{}^{143}\mathrm{Nd}}{{}^{144}\mathrm{Nd}}\right)_{\mathrm{initial}} + \left(\frac{{}^{147}\mathrm{Sm}}{{}^{144}\mathrm{Nd}}\right) \cdot (e^{\lambda t}-1),$$

where:

t is the age of the sample,
λ is the decay constant of ^{147}Sm,
(e^{λt}−1) is the slope of the isochron which defines the age of the system.

Alternatively, one can assume that the material formed from mantle material which was following the same path of evolution of these ratios as chondrites, and then again the time of formation can be calculated (see Samarium–neodymium dating#The CHUR model).

== See also ==
- Isotopes of samarium

Lighter: samarium-146	Samarium-147 is an isotope of samarium	Heavier: samarium-148
Decay product of: gadolinium-151 (α) promethium-147 (β^{−})	Decay chain of samarium-147	Decays to: neodymium-143 (α)
