= Isotopes of praseodymium =

Isotopes of praseodymium (_{59}Pr)
Main isotopes			Decay	
Isotope	abundance	half-life (t_{1/2})	mode	product
^{141}Pr	100%	stable		
^{142}Pr	synth	19.12 h	β^{−}	^{142}Nd
^{142}Pr	synth	19.12 h	ε	^{142}Ce
^{143}Pr	synth	13.57 d	β^{−}	^{143}Nd

Standard atomic weight A_{r}°(Pr)
- 140.90766±0.00001; 140.91±0.01 (abridged)

Naturally occurring praseodymium (_{59}Pr) is composed of one stable isotope, ^{141}Pr. Forty radioisotopes have been characterized with the most stable being ^{143}Pr, with a half-life of 13.57 days and ^{142}Pr, with a half-life of 19.12 hours. All of the remaining radioactive isotopes have half-lives that are less than six hours and the majority of these have half-lives that are less than 33 seconds. This element also has 19 meta states with the most stable being ^{138m}Pr (2.12 hours), ^{142m}Pr (14.6 minutes) and ^{134m}Pr (~11 minutes).

The known isotopes of praseodymium range from ^{121}Pr to ^{161}Pr. The primary decay mode of isotopes lighter than ^{141}Pr is positron emission or electron capture to isotopes of cerium, while that of heavier isotopes is beta decay to isotopes of neodymium.

== List of isotopes ==
Nuclide (Note: ^{m}Pr – Excited nuclear isomer.)	Z	N	Isotopic mass (Da) (Note: ( ) – Uncertainty (1σ) is given in concise form in parentheses after the corresponding last digits.) (Note: # – Atomic mass marked #: value and uncertainty derived not from purely experimental data, but at least partly from trends from the Mass Surface (TMS).)	Discovery year	Half-life (Note: # – Values marked # are not purely derived from experimental data, but at least partly from trends of neighboring nuclides (TNN).)	Decay mode (Note: Modes of decay: EC: / Electron capture; IT: / Isomeric transition; p: / Proton emission)	Daughter isotope (Note: Bold italics symbol as daughter – Daughter product is nearly stable.) (Note: Bold symbol as daughter – Daughter product is stable.)	Spin and parity (Note: ( ) spin value – Indicates spin with weak assignment arguments.)	Isotopic abundance
Nuclide	Excitation energy			Discovery year	Half-life	Decay mode	Daughter isotope	Spin and parity	Isotopic abundance
^{120}Pr	59	61		2026					
^{121}Pr	59	62	120.95539(54)#	2005	12(5) ms	p	^{120}Ce	(3/2)(+#)	
^{122}Pr	59	63	121.95193(54)#	2025	500# ms [>310 ns]				
^{123}Pr	59	64	122.94608(43)#	2025	800# ms [>310 ns]			3/2+#	
^{124}Pr	59	65	123.94294(43)#	1986	1.2(2) s	β^{+}	^{124}Ce		
^{124}Pr	59	65	123.94294(43)#	1986	1.2(2) s	β^{+}, p (?%)	^{123}La		
^{125}Pr	59	66	124.93766(32)#	2002	3.3(7) s	β^{+}	^{125}Ce	3/2+#	
^{126}Pr	59	67	125.93524(21)#	1983	3.12(18) s	β^{+}	^{126}Ce	(4, 5)	
^{126}Pr	59	67	125.93524(21)#	1983	3.12(18) s	β^{+}, p (?%)	^{125}La	(4, 5)	
^{127}Pr	59	68	126.93071(21)#	1995	4.2(3) s	β^{+}	^{127}Ce	3/2+#	
^{127m}Pr	600(200)# keV			(1998) (Note: Half-life not measured, not included in discovery database)	2# μs			(11/2−)	
^{128}Pr	59	69	127.928791(32)	1985	2.85(9) s	β^{+}	^{128}Ce	(3+)	
^{128}Pr	59	69	127.928791(32)	1985	2.85(9) s	β^{+}, p (?%)	^{127}La	(3+)	
^{129}Pr	59	70	128.925095(32)	1977	30(4) s	β^{+}	^{129}Ce	(3/2+)	
^{129m}Pr	382.57(24) keV			(1997)	26(11)# μs	IT	^{129}Pr	(11/2−)	
^{130}Pr	59	71	129.923590(69)	1977	40.0(4) s	β^{+}	^{130}Ce	(6, 7)(+#)	
^{130m}Pr	100(100)# keV			(1990) (Note: Only published in a conference proceeding and not a refereed journal.)	10# s			2+#	
^{131}Pr	59	72	130.920235(50)	1977	1.50(3) min	β^{+}	^{131}Ce	(3/2+)	
^{131m}Pr	152.4(3) keV			1996	5.73(20) s	IT (96.4%)	^{131}Pr	(11/2−)	
^{131m}Pr	152.4(3) keV			1996	5.73(20) s	β^{+} (3.6%)	^{131}Ce	(11/2−)	
^{132}Pr	59	73	131.919240(31)	1974	1.49(11) min	β^{+}	^{132}Ce	(2+)	
^{132m1}Pr (Note: Order of ground state and isomer is uncertain.)	30(30)# keV			(1990)	1# s			(5+)	
^{132m2}Pr	250(30)# keV			2012	2.46(4) μs	IT	^{132}Pr	(8+)	
^{132m3}Pr	300(30)# keV			2012	486(70) ns	IT	^{132}Pr	(8−)	
^{133}Pr	59	74	132.916331(13)	1970	6.5(3) min	β^{+}	^{133}Ce	5/2+	
^{133m}Pr	192.12(14) keV			2001	1.1(2) μs	IT	^{133}Pr	(11/2−)	
^{134}Pr	59	75	133.915697(22)	1967	17(2) min	β^{+}	^{134}Ce	2−	
^{134m}Pr	67.7(4) keV			1973	~11 min	β^{+}	^{134}Ce	6−	
^{135}Pr	59	76	134.913112(13)	1954	24(1) min	β^{+}	^{135}Ce	3/2+	
^{135m}Pr	358.06(6) keV			1973	105(10) μs	IT	^{135}Pr	(11/2−)	
^{136}Pr	59	77	135.912677(12)	1968	13.1(1) min	β^{+}	^{136}Ce	2+	
^{137}Pr	59	78	136.9106792(87)	1958	1.28(3) h	β^{+}	^{137}Ce	5/2+	
^{137m}Pr	561.22(23) keV			1975	2.66(7) μs	IT	^{137}Pr	11/2−	
^{138}Pr	59	79	137.910757(11)	1951	1.45(5) min	β^{+}	^{138}Ce	1+	
^{138m}Pr	350(19) keV			1966	2.12(4) h	β^{+}	^{138}Ce	7−	
^{139}Pr	59	80	138.9089327(39)	1951	4.41(4) h	β^{+}	^{139}Ce	5/2+	
^{140}Pr	59	81	139.9090856(66)	1938	3.39(1) min	EC (51.3%)	^{140}Ce	1+	
^{140}Pr	59	81	139.9090856(66)	1938	3.39(1) min	β^{+} (48.7%)	^{140}Ce	1+	
^{140m1}Pr	127.8(3) keV			1964	0.35(2) μs	IT	^{140}Pr	5+	
^{140m2}Pr	763.7(5) keV			1964	3.05(20) μs	IT	^{140}Pr	(7)−	
^{141}Pr (Note: Fission product)	59	82	140.9076596(16)	1924	Stable			5/2+	1.0000
^{142}Pr	59	83	141.9100516(16)	1935	19.12(4) h	β^{−} (99.98%)	^{142}Nd	2−	
^{142}Pr	59	83	141.9100516(16)	1935	19.12(4) h	EC (0.0164%)	^{142}Ce	2−	
^{142m}Pr	3.694(3) keV			1967	14.6(5) min	IT	^{142}Pr	5−	
^{143}Pr	59	84	142.9108226(19)	1951	13.57(2) d	β^{−}	^{143}Nd	7/2+	
^{144}Pr	59	85	143.9133107(29)	1946	17.28(5) min	β^{−}	^{144}Nd	0−	
^{144m}Pr	59.03(3) keV			1970	7.2(3) min	IT (~99.93%)	^{144}Pr	3−	
^{144m}Pr	59.03(3) keV			1970	7.2(3) min	β^{−} (~0.07%)	^{144}Nd	3−	
^{145}Pr	59	86	144.9145180(77)	1954	5.984(10) h	β^{−}	^{145}Nd	7/2+	
^{146}Pr	59	87	145.917688(37)	1953	24.09(10) min	β^{−}	^{146}Nd	(2−)	
^{147}Pr	59	88	146.919007(17)	1964	13.39(4) min	β^{−}	^{147}Nd	3/2+	
^{148}Pr	59	89	147.922130(16)	1964	2.29(2) min	β^{−}	^{148}Nd	1−	
^{148m}Pr	76.80(20) keV			1979	2.01(7) min	β^{−} (64%)	^{148}Nd	(4)	
^{148m}Pr	76.80(20) keV			1979	2.01(7) min	IT (36%)	^{148}Pr	(4)	
^{149}Pr	59	90	148.923736(11)	1964	2.26(7) min	β^{−}	^{149}Nd	(5/2+)	
^{150}Pr	59	91	149.9266764(97)	1970	6.19(16) s	β^{−}	^{150}Nd	1−	
^{151}Pr	59	92	150.928309(13)	1990	18.90(7) s	β^{−}	^{151}Nd	(3/2−)	
^{151m}Pr	35.10(10) keV			2006	50(8) μs	IT	^{151}Pr	(7/2+)	
^{152}Pr	59	93	151.931553(20)	1983	3.57(11) s	β^{−}	^{152}Nd	4+	
^{152m}Pr	115.1(3) keV			1990	4.16(10) μs	IT	^{152}Pr	(1+)	
^{153}Pr	59	94	152.933904(13)	1987	4.28(11) s	β^{−}	^{153}Nd	3/2−#	
^{154}Pr	59	95	153.93789(11)	1988	2.30(9) s	β^{−}	^{154}Nd	(3+)	
^{155}Pr	59	96	154.940509(18)	2012	1.47(3) s	β^{−}	^{155}Nd	3/2−#	
^{156}Pr	59	97	155.9447669(11)	2017	444(6) ms	β^{−}	^{156}Nd	1+#	
^{157}Pr	59	98	156.9480031(34)	2017	307(21) ms	β^{−}	^{157}Nd	3/2−#	
^{158}Pr	59	99	157.95260(32)#	2017	181(14) ms	β^{−}	^{158}Nd	5−#	
^{159}Pr	59	100	158.95623(43)#	2017	134(43) ms	β^{−}	^{159}Nd	3/2−#	
^{160}Pr	59	101	159.96114(43)#	2017	170(140) ms	β^{−}	^{160}Nd	1+#	
^{161}Pr	59	102	160.96512(54)#	2018	90# ms [>550 ns]			3/2−#	
This table header & footer:

== See also ==
Daughter products other than praseodymium

- Isotopes of neodymium
- Isotopes of cerium
- Isotopes of lanthanum
