= Isotopes of cerium =

Isotopes of cerium (_{58}Ce)
Main isotopes			Decay	
Isotope	abundance	half-life (t_{1/2})	mode	product
^{134}Ce	synth	3.16 d	ε	^{134}La
^{136}Ce	0.186%	stable		
^{138}Ce	0.251%	stable		
^{139}Ce	synth	137.64 d	ε	^{139}La
^{140}Ce	88.4%	stable		
^{141}Ce	synth	32.505 d	β^{−}	^{141}Pr
^{142}Ce	11.1%	stable		
^{143}Ce	synth	33.039 h	β^{−}	^{143}Pr
^{144}Ce	synth	284.89 d	β^{−}	^{144}Pr

Standard atomic weight A_{r}°(Ce)
- 140.116±0.001; 140.12±0.01 (abridged)

Naturally occurring cerium (_{58}Ce) is composed of 4 stable isotopes: ^{136}Ce, ^{138}Ce, ^{140}Ce, and ^{142}Ce, with ^{140}Ce being the most abundant (88.45% natural abundance) and the only one that is theoretically stable. The others, ^{136}Ce, ^{138}Ce, and ^{142}Ce are predicted to undergo double beta decay, which has never been observed. There are 35 radioisotopes that have been characterized, with the most stable being ^{144}Ce, with a half-life of 284.89 days; ^{139}Ce, with a half-life of 137.64 days and ^{141}Ce, with a half-life of 32.505 days. All of the remaining radioactive isotopes have half-lives that are less than 4 days and the majority of these have half-lives that are less than 10 minutes.

The known isotopes of cerium range from ^{117}Ce to ^{160}Ce, in addition to 14 meta states.

== List of isotopes ==
Nuclide (Note: ^{m}Ce – Excited nuclear isomer.)	Z	N	Isotopic mass (Da) (Note: ( ) – Uncertainty (1σ) is given in concise form in parentheses after the corresponding last digits.) (Note: # – Atomic mass marked #: value and uncertainty derived not from purely experimental data, but at least partly from trends from the Mass Surface (TMS).)	Discovery year	Half-life (Note: # – Values marked # are not purely derived from experimental data, but at least partly from trends of neighboring nuclides (TNN).)	Decay mode (Note: Modes of decay: EC: / Electron capture; IT: / Isomeric transition; p: / Proton emission)	Daughter isotope (Note: Bold symbol as daughter – Daughter product is stable.)	Spin and parity (Note: ( ) spin value – Indicates spin with weak assignment arguments.)	Natural abundance (mole fraction)	
Nuclide	Excitation energy			Discovery year	Half-life	Decay mode	Daughter isotope	Spin and parity	Normal proportion	Range of variation
^{117}Ce	58	59		2026						
^{118}Ce	58	60		2026						
^{119}Ce	58	61	118.95296(54)#	2025	200# ms [>310 ns]			5/2+#		
^{120}Ce	58	62	119.94661(54)#	2025	250# ms [>310 ns]			0+		
^{121}Ce	58	63	120.94344(43)#	1997	1.1(1) s	β^{+} (99%)	^{121}La	5/2(+#)		
^{121}Ce	58	63	120.94344(43)#	1997	1.1(1) s	β^{+}, p (1%)	^{120}Ba	5/2(+#)		
^{122}Ce	58	64	121.93787(43)#	2005	2# s	β^{+}	^{122}La	0+		
^{123}Ce	58	65	122.93528(32)#	1984	3.8(2) s	β^{+} (?%)	^{123}La	(5/2)(+#)		
^{123}Ce	58	65	122.93528(32)#	1984	3.8(2) s	β^{+}, p (?%)	^{122}Ba	(5/2)(+#)		
^{124}Ce	58	66	123.93031(32)#	1978	9.1(12) s	β^{+}	^{124}La	0+		
^{125}Ce	58	67	124.92844(21)#	1978	9.7(3) s	β^{+} (?%)	^{125}La	(7/2−)		
^{125}Ce	58	67	124.92844(21)#	1978	9.7(3) s	β^{+}, p (?%)	^{124}Ba	(7/2−)		
^{125m}Ce	93.6(4) keV			2007	13(10) s	IT	^{125}Ce	(1/2+)		
^{126}Ce	58	68	125.923971(30)	1978	51.0(3) s	β^{+}	^{126}La	0+		
^{127}Ce	58	69	126.922727(31)	1978	34(2) s	β^{+}	^{127}La	(1/2+)		
^{127m1}Ce	7.3(11) keV			1996	28.6(7) s	β^{+}	^{127}La	(5/2+)		
^{127m2}Ce	36.9(11) keV			1994	>10 μs	IT	^{127}Ce	(7/2−)		
^{128}Ce	58	70	127.918911(30)	1968	3.93(2) min	β^{+}	^{128}La	0+		
^{129}Ce	58	71	128.918102(30)	1977	3.5(3) min	β^{+}	^{129}La	(5/2+)		
^{130}Ce	58	72	129.914736(30)	1965	22.9(5) min	β^{+}	^{130}La	0+		
^{130m}Ce	2453.6(3) keV			1984	100(8) ns	IT	^{130}Ce	7−		
^{131}Ce	58	73	130.914429(35)	1966	10.3(3) min	β^{+}	^{131}La	7/2+		
^{131m}Ce	63.09(9) keV			1966	5.4(4) min	β^{+}	^{131}La	(1/2+)		
^{132}Ce	58	74	131.911466(22)	1960	3.51(11) h	β^{+}	^{132}La	0+		
^{132m}Ce	2341.15(21) keV			1968	9.4(3) ms	IT	^{132}Ce	8−		
^{133}Ce	58	75	132.911520(18)	1951	97(4) min	β^{+}	^{133}La	1/2+		
^{133m}Ce	37.2(7) keV			1967	5.1(3) h	β^{+}	^{133}La	9/2−		
^{134}Ce	58	76	133.908928(22)	1951	3.16(4) d	EC	^{134}La	0+		
^{134m}Ce	3208.6(4) keV			1980	308(5) ns	IT	^{134}Ce	10+		
^{135}Ce	58	77	134.909161(11)	1948	17.7(3) h	β^{+}	^{135}La	1/2+		
^{135m}Ce	445.81(21) keV			1970	20(1) s	IT	^{135}Ce	(11/2−)		
^{136}Ce	58	78	135.90712926(35)	1936	Observationally stable (Note: Theorized to undergo β^{+}β^{+} decay to ^{136}Ba with a half-life over 3.2×10^{16} years)			0+	0.00186(2)	
^{136m}Ce	3095.0(6) keV			1975	1.96(9) μs	IT	^{136}Ce	10+		
^{137}Ce	58	79	136.90776242(39)	1948	9.0(3) h	β^{+}	^{137}La	3/2+		
^{137m}Ce	254.29(5) keV			1955	34.4(3) h	IT (99.21%)	^{137}Ce	11/2−		
^{137m}Ce	254.29(5) keV			1955	34.4(3) h	β^{+} (0.79%)	^{137}La	11/2−		
^{138}Ce	58	80	137.90599418(54)	1936	Observationally stable (Note: Theorized to undergo β^{+}β^{+} decay to ^{138}Ba with a half-life over 4.4×10^{16} years)			0+	0.00251(2)	
^{138m}Ce	2129.28(12) keV			1960	8.73(20) ms	IT	^{138}Ce	7-		
^{139}Ce	58	81	138.9066470(22)	1948	137.642(20) d	EC	^{139}La	3/2+		
^{139m}Ce	754.24(8) keV			1956	57.58(32) s	IT	^{139}Ce	11/2−		
^{140}Ce (Note: Fission product)	58	82	139.9054484(14)	1924	Stable			0+	0.88449(51)	
^{140m}Ce	2107.854(24) keV			1964	7.3(15) μs	IT	^{140}Ce	6+		
^{141}Ce	58	83	140.9082860(14)	1951	32.505(10) d	β^{−}	^{141}Pr	7/2−		
^{142}Ce	58	84	141.9092502(26)	1924	Observationally stable (Note: Theorized to undergo β^{−}β^{−} decay to ^{142}Nd or α decay to ^{138}Ba with a half-life over 2.9×10^{18} years)			0+	0.11114(51)	
^{143}Ce	58	85	142.9123920(26)	1951	33.039(6) h	β^{−}	^{143}Pr	3/2−		
^{144}Ce	58	86	143.9136528(30)	1946	284.886(25) d	β^{−}	^{144}Pr	0+		
^{145}Ce	58	87	144.917265(36)	1954	3.01(6) min	β^{−}	^{145}Pr	5/2−#		
^{146}Ce	58	88	145.918812(16)	1953	13.49(16) min	β^{−}	^{146}Pr	0+		
^{147}Ce	58	89	146.9226899(92)	1964	56.4(10) s	β^{−}	^{147}Pr	(5/2−)		
^{148}Ce	58	90	147.924424(12)	1964	56.8(3) s	β^{−}	^{148}Pr	0+		
^{149}Ce	58	91	148.928427(11)	1971	4.94(4) s	β^{−}	^{149}Pr	3/2−#		
^{150}Ce	58	92	149.930384(13)	1970	6.05(7) s	β^{−}	^{150}Pr	0+		
^{151}Ce	58	93	150.934272(19)	1997	1.76(6) s	β^{−}	^{151}Pr	(3/2−)		
^{152}Ce	58	94	151.93668(22)#	1990	1.42(2) s	β^{−}	^{152}Pr	0+		
^{153}Ce	58	95	152.94105(22)#	1994	865(25) ms	β^{−}	^{153}Pr	3/2−#		
^{154}Ce	58	96	153.94394(22)#	1994	722(14) ms	β^{−}	^{154}Pr	0+		
^{155}Ce	58	97	154.94871(32)#	1994	313(7) ms	β^{−}	^{155}Pr	5/2−#		
^{156}Ce	58	98	155.95188(32)#	2017	233(9) ms	β^{−}	^{156}Pr	0+		
^{157}Ce	58	99	156.95713(43)#	2017	175(41) ms	β^{−}	^{157}Pr	7/2+#		
^{158}Ce	58	100	157.96077(43)#	2017	99(93) ms	β^{−}	^{158}Pr	0+		
^{159}Ce	58	101	158.96636(54)#	2026				1/2−#		
^{160}Ce	58	102		2026				0+		
This table header & footer:

== See also ==
Daughter products other than cerium

- Isotopes of praseodymium
- Isotopes of lanthanum
- Isotopes of barium
