= Isotopes of barium =

Isotopes of barium (_{56}Ba)
Main isotopes			Decay	
Isotope	abundance	half-life (t_{1/2})	mode	product
^{130}Ba	0.11%	(0.5–2.7)×10^{21} y	εε	^{130}Xe
^{131}Ba	synth	11.52 d	β^{+}	^{131}Cs
^{132}Ba	0.10%	stable		
^{133}Ba	synth	10.538 y	ε	^{133}Cs
^{134}Ba	2.42%	stable		
^{135}Ba	6.59%	stable		
^{136}Ba	7.85%	stable		
^{137}Ba	11.23%	stable		
^{138}Ba	71.70%	stable		
^{140}Ba	synth	12.753 d	β^{−}	^{140}La

Standard atomic weight A_{r}°(Ba)
- 137.327±0.007; 137.33±0.01 (abridged)

Naturally occurring barium (_{56}Ba) is a mix of six stable isotopes and one very long-lived radioactive primordial isotope, barium-130, identified as being unstable by geochemical means (from analysis of the presence of its daughter xenon-130 in rocks) in 2001, presumably decaying by double electron capture with a half-life of (0.5–2.7)×10^{21} years (about 10^{11} times the age of the universe). The two measurements are discordant; the above reflects the total range, the value in the table below is a crude average.

With the total range of mass numbers known 113 to 154, there are thirty-three known radioisotopes in addition to ^{130}Ba. The longest-lived of these is ^{133}Ba, which has a half-life of 10.538 years; all others have half-lives shorter than two weeks. The longest-lived isomers are ^{133m}Ba at 38.90 hours and ^{135m1}Ba at 28.11 hours. The analogous ^{137m1}Ba (half-life 2.552 minutes) occurs in the decay of the common fission product caesium-137.

Barium-114 is theorized to undergo cluster decay, emitting a nucleus of stable ^{12}C to produce ^{102}Sn. This decay has not been observed, with only an upper limit on the branching ratio of such decay (0.0034%).

== List of isotopes ==
Nuclide (Note: ^{m}Ba – Excited nuclear isomer.)	Z	N	Isotopic mass (Da) (Note: ( ) – Uncertainty (1σ) is given in concise form in parentheses after the corresponding last digits.) (Note: # – Atomic mass marked #: value and uncertainty derived not from purely experimental data, but at least partly from trends from the Mass Surface (TMS).)	Discovery year	Half-life	Decay mode (Note: Modes of decay: EC: / Electron capture; CD: / Cluster decay; IT: / Isomeric transition; n: / Neutron emission; p: / Proton emission)	Daughter isotope (Note: Bold italics symbol as daughter – Daughter product is nearly stable.) (Note: Bold symbol as daughter – Daughter product is stable.)	Spin and parity (Note: ( ) spin value – Indicates spin with weak assignment arguments.) (Note: # – Values marked # are not purely derived from experimental data, but at least partly from trends of neighboring nuclides (TNN).)	Natural abundance (mole fraction)	
Nuclide	Excitation energy			Discovery year	Half-life	Decay mode	Daughter isotope	Spin and parity	Normal proportion	Range of variation
^{113}Ba	56	57		2026						
^{114}Ba	56	58	113.95072(11)	1995	460(125) ms	β^{+} (79%)	^{114}Cs	0+		
^{114}Ba	56	58	113.95072(11)	1995	460(125) ms	α (0.9%)	^{110}Xe	0+		
^{114}Ba	56	58	113.95072(11)	1995	460(125) ms	β^{+}, p (20%)	^{113}Xe	0+		
^{114}Ba	56	58	113.95072(11)	1995	460(125) ms	CD (<.0034%)	^{102}Sn + ^{12}C	0+		
^{115}Ba	56	59	114.94748(22)#	1997	0.45(5) s	β^{+}	^{115}Cs	5/2+#		
^{115}Ba	56	59	114.94748(22)#	1997	0.45(5) s	β^{+}, p (>15%)	^{114}Xe	5/2+#		
^{116}Ba	56	60	115.94162(22)#	1997	1.3(2) s	β^{+} (97%)	^{116}Cs	0+		
^{116}Ba	56	60	115.94162(22)#	1997	1.3(2) s	β^{+}, p (3%)	^{115}Xe	0+		
^{117}Ba	56	61	116.93832(27)	1977	1.75(7) s	β^{+} (87%)	^{117}Cs	(3/2+)		
^{117}Ba	56	61	116.93832(27)	1977	1.75(7) s	β^{+}, p (13%)	^{116}Xe	(3/2+)		
^{117}Ba	56	61	116.93832(27)	1977	1.75(7) s	β^{+}, α (0.024%)	^{113}I	(3/2+)		
^{118}Ba	56	62	117.93323(22)#	1997	5.2(2) s	β^{+}	^{118}Cs	0+		
^{119}Ba	56	63	118.93066(21)	1974	5.4(3) s	β^{+} (75%)	^{119}Cs	(3/2+)		
^{119}Ba	56	63	118.93066(21)	1974	5.4(3) s	β^{+}, p (25%)	^{118}Xe	(3/2+)		
^{119m}Ba	66.0 keV			2021	360(20) ns	IT	^{119}Ba	(5/2−)		
^{120}Ba	56	64	119.92604(32)	1974	24(2) s	β^{+}	^{120}Cs	0+		
^{121}Ba	56	65	120.92405(15)	1975	29.7(15) s	β^{+} (99.98%)	^{121}Cs	5/2+		
^{121}Ba	56	65	120.92405(15)	1975	29.7(15) s	β^{+}, p (0.02%)	^{120}Xe	5/2+		
^{122}Ba	56	66	121.91990(3)	1974	1.95(15) min	β^{+}	^{122}Cs	0+		
^{123}Ba	56	67	122.918781(13)	1962	2.7(4) min	β^{+}	^{123}Cs	5/2+		
^{123m}Ba	120.95(8) keV			1991	830(60) ns	IT	^{123}Ba	1/2+#		
^{124}Ba	56	68	123.915094(13)	1967	11.0(5) min	β^{+}	^{124}Cs	0+		
^{125}Ba	56	69	124.914472(12)	1962	3.3(3) min	β^{+}	^{125}Cs	1/2+		
^{125m}Ba	120(20)# keV			2002	2.76(14) μs	IT	^{125}Ba	(7/2−)		
^{126}Ba	56	70	125.911250(13)	1954	100(2) min	β^{+}	^{126}Cs	0+		
^{127}Ba	56	71	126.911091(12)	1952	12.7(4) min	β^{+}	^{127}Cs	1/2+		
^{127m}Ba	80.32(11) keV			1992	1.93(7) s	IT	^{127}Ba	7/2−		
^{128}Ba	56	72	127.9083524(17)	1950	2.43(5) d	EC	^{128}Cs	0+		
^{129}Ba	56	73	128.908683(11)	1950	2.23(11) h	β^{+}	^{129}Cs	1/2+		
^{129m}Ba	8.42(6) keV			1961	2.135(10) h	β^{+}	^{129}Cs	7/2+		
^{129m}Ba	8.42(6) keV			1961	2.135(10) h	IT?	^{129}Ba	7/2+		
^{130}Ba (Note: Primordial radionuclide)	56	74	129.9063260(3)	1936	≈ 1×10^{21} y	εε	^{130}Xe	0+	0.0011(1)	
^{130m}Ba	2475.12(18) keV			1966	9.54(14) ms	IT	^{130}Ba	8−		
^{131}Ba	56	75	130.9069463(4)	1947	11.52(1) d	β^{+}	^{131}Cs	1/2+		
^{131m}Ba	187.995(9) keV			1963	14.26(9) min	IT	^{131}Ba	9/2−		
^{132}Ba	56	76	131.9050612(11)	1936	Observationally Stable (Note: Believed to undergo β^{+}β^{+} decay to ^{132}Xe with a half-life over 3×10^{20} years)			0+	0.0010(1)	
^{133}Ba	56	77	132.9060074(11)	1941	10.5379(16) y	EC	^{133}Cs	1/2+		
^{133m}Ba	288.252(9) keV			1941	38.90(6) h	IT (99.99%)	^{133}Ba	11/2−		
^{133m}Ba	288.252(9) keV			1941	38.90(6) h	EC (0.0104%)	^{133}Cs	11/2−		
^{134}Ba (Note: Fission product)	56	78	133.90450825(27)	1936	Stable			0+	0.0242(15)	
^{134m}Ba	2957.2(5) keV			1980	2.61(13) μs	IT	^{134}Ba	10+		
^{135}Ba	56	79	134.90568845(26)	1931	Stable			3/2+	0.0659(10)	
^{135m1}Ba	268.218(20) keV			1948	28.11(2) h	IT	^{135}Ba	11/2−		
^{135m2}Ba	2388.0(5) keV			2018	1.06(4) ms	IT	^{135}Ba	(23/2+)		
^{136}Ba	56	80	135.90457580(26)	1931	Stable			0+	0.0785(24)	
^{136m1}Ba	2030.535(18) keV			1965	308.4(19) ms	IT	^{136}Ba	7−		
^{136m2}Ba	3357.19(25) keV			(2004) (Note: Half-life shorter than 100 ns, not included in the discovery database.)	91(2) ns	IT	^{136}Ba	10+		
^{137}Ba	56	81	136.90582721(27)	1931	Stable			3/2+	0.1123(23)	
^{137m1}Ba	661.659(3) keV			1948	2.552(1) min	IT	^{137}Ba	11/2−		
^{137m2}Ba	2349.1(5) keV			1973	589(20) ns	IT	^{137}Ba	(19/2−)		
^{138}Ba	56	82	137.90524706(27)	1924	Stable			0+	0.7170(29)	
^{138m}Ba	2090.536(21) keV			1971	850(100) ns	IT	^{138}Ba	6+		
^{139}Ba	56	83	138.90884116(27)	1937	82.93(9) min	β^{−}	^{139}La	7/2−		
^{140}Ba	56	84	139.910608(8)	1939	12.7534(21) d	β^{−}	^{140}La	0+		
^{141}Ba	56	85	140.914404(6)	1951	18.27(7) min	β^{−}	^{141}La	3/2−		
^{142}Ba	56	86	141.916433(6)	1959	10.6(2) min	β^{−}	^{142}La	0+		
^{143}Ba	56	87	142.920625(7)	1962	14.5(3) s	β^{−}	^{143}La	5/2−		
^{144}Ba	56	88	143.922955(8)	1967	11.73(8) s	β^{−}	^{144}La	0+		
^{145}Ba	56	89	144.927518(9)	1974	4.31(16) s	β^{−}	^{145}La	5/2−		
^{146}Ba	56	90	145.9303632(19)	1970	2.15(4) s	β^{−}	^{146}La	0+		
^{147}Ba	56	91	146.935304(21)	1978	893(1) ms	β^{−} (99.93%)	^{147}La	5/2−		
^{147}Ba	56	91	146.935304(21)	1978	893(1) ms	β^{−}, n (0.07%)	^{146}La	5/2−		
^{148}Ba	56	92	147.9382230(16)	1979	620(5) ms	β^{−} (99.6%)	^{148}La	0+		
^{148}Ba	56	92	147.9382230(16)	1979	620(5) ms	β^{−}, n (0.4%)	^{147}La	0+		
^{149}Ba	56	93	148.9432840(27)	1993	349(4) ms	β^{−} (96.1%)	^{149}La	3/2−#		
^{149}Ba	56	93	148.9432840(27)	1993	349(4) ms	β^{−}, n (3.9%)	^{148}La	3/2−#		
^{150}Ba	56	94	149.946441(6)	1994	258(5) ms	β^{−} (99.0%)	^{150}La	0+		
^{150}Ba	56	94	149.946441(6)	1994	258(5) ms	β^{−}, n (1.0%)	^{149}La	0+		
^{151}Ba	56	95	150.95176(43)#	1994	167(5) ms	β^{−}	^{151}La	3/2−#		
^{151}Ba	56	95	150.95176(43)#	1994	167(5) ms	β^{−}, n?	^{150}La	3/2−#		
^{152}Ba	56	96	151.95533(43)#	2010	139(8) ms	β^{−}	^{152}La	0+		
^{152}Ba	56	96	151.95533(43)#	2010	139(8) ms	β^{−}, n?	^{151}La	0+		
^{153}Ba	56	97	152.96085(43)#	2017	113(39) ms	β^{−}	^{153}La	5/2−#		
^{153}Ba	56	97	152.96085(43)#	2017	113(39) ms	β^{−}, n?	^{152}La	5/2−#		
^{153}Ba	56	97	152.96085(43)#	2017	113(39) ms	β^{−}, 2n?	^{151}La	5/2−#		
^{154}Ba	56	98	153.96466(54)#	2017	53(48) ms	β^{−}	^{154}La	0+		
^{155}Ba	56	99		2026						
This table header & footer:

== Barium-131 ==
Barium-131 is a radioactive isotope of barium with a half-life of 11.52 days. It decays to caesium-131 by electron capture. It is produced by irradiation of caesium with protons with the reaction ^{133}Cs(p,3n)^{131}Ba. It is developed for SPECT imaging and can be combined with the alpha-emitter radium-223.

== See also ==
Daughter products other than barium

- Isotopes of lanthanum
- Isotopes of caesium
- Isotopes of xenon
- Isotopes of iodine
- Isotopes of tin
- Isotopes of carbon
