= Isotopes of samarium =

Isotopes of samarium (_{62}Sm)
Main isotopes			Decay	
Isotope	abundance	half-life (t_{1/2})	mode	product
^{144}Sm	3.08%	stable		
^{145}Sm	synth	340 d	ε	^{145}Pm
^{146}Sm	trace	9.20×10^{7} y	α	^{142}Nd
^{147}Sm	15%	1.066×10^{11} y	α	^{143}Nd
^{148}Sm	11.3%	6.3×10^{15} y	α	^{144}Nd
^{149}Sm	13.8%	stable		
^{150}Sm	7.37%	stable		
^{151}Sm	synth	94.6 y	β^{−}	^{151}Eu
^{152}Sm	26.7%	stable		
^{153}Sm	synth	46.285 h	β^{−}	^{153}Eu
^{154}Sm	22.7%	stable		

Standard atomic weight A_{r}°(Sm)
- 150.36±0.02; 150.36±0.02 (abridged)

Naturally occurring samarium (_{62}Sm) is composed of five stable isotopes, ^{144}Sm, ^{149}Sm, ^{150}Sm, ^{152}Sm and ^{154}Sm, and two extremely long-lived radioisotopes, ^{147}Sm (half life: 1.066×10^{11} y) and ^{148}Sm (6.3×10^{15} y), with ^{152}Sm being the most abundant (26.75% natural abundance). ^{146}Sm (9.20×10^{7} y) is also fairly long-lived, but is not long-lived enough to have survived in significant quantities from the formation of the Solar System on Earth, although it remains useful in radiometric dating in the Solar System as an extinct radionuclide. It is the longest-lived nuclide that has not yet been confirmed to be primordial. Its instability is due to having 84 neutrons (two more than 82, which is a magic number corresponding to a stable neutron configuration), and so it may emit an alpha particle (which has 2 neutrons) to form neodymium-142 with 82 neutrons.

Other than those, the longest-lived radioisotopes are ^{151}Sm, which has a half-life of 94.6 years, and ^{145}Sm, which has a half-life of 340 days. All of the remaining radioisotopes, which range from ^{129}Sm to ^{168}Sm, have half-lives that are less than two days, and the majority of these have half-lives that are less than 48 seconds. The most stable of the known isomers is ^{141m}Sm (half-life 22.6 minutes).

The long-lived isotopes, ^{146}Sm, ^{147}Sm, and ^{148}Sm, decay by alpha emission to isotopes of neodymium. Lighter unstable isotopes of samarium primarily decay by electron capture to isotopes of promethium, while heavier ones decay by beta decay to isotopes of europium. A 2012 paper revising the estimated half-life of ^{146}Sm from 10.3(5)×10^{7} y to 6.8(7)×10^{7} y was retracted (due to an experimental mistake) in 2023, and the current, more accurate, value published subsequently.

The isotope ^{147}Sm is used in samarium–neodymium dating and as mentioned the extinct ^{146}Sm can also be used for dating.

^{151}Sm is a medium-lived fission product and acts as a neutron poison in the nuclear fuel cycle. The stable fission product ^{149}Sm is also a neutron poison.

Samarium is the lightest element with even atomic number with no theoretically stable isotopes (all isotopes of it can energetically decay by the alpha, beta, or double-beta modes); other such elements are those with atomic numbers > 66 (dysprosium, which has the heaviest theoretically stable nuclide, ^{164}Dy).

== List of isotopes ==
Nuclide (Note: ^{m}Sm – Excited nuclear isomer.)	Z	N	Isotopic mass (Da) (Note: ( ) – Uncertainty (1σ) is given in concise form in parentheses after the corresponding last digits.) (Note: # – Atomic mass marked #: value and uncertainty derived not from purely experimental data, but at least partly from trends from the Mass Surface (TMS).)	Discovery year	Half-life (Note: Bold half-life – nearly stable, half-life longer than age of universe.) (Note: # – Values marked # are not purely derived from experimental data, but at least partly from trends of neighboring nuclides (TNN).)	Decay mode (Note: Modes of decay: IT: / Isomeric transition; p: / Proton emission)	Daughter isotope (Note: Bold italics symbol as daughter – Daughter product is nearly stable.) (Note: Bold symbol as daughter – Daughter product is stable.)	Spin and parity (Note: ( ) spin value – Indicates spin with weak assignment arguments.)	Natural abundance (mole fraction)	
Nuclide	Excitation energy			Discovery year	Half-life	Decay mode	Daughter isotope	Spin and parity	Normal proportion	Range of variation
^{128}Sm	62	66	127.95797(54)#	2025	500# ms [>310 ns]			0+		
^{129}Sm	62	67	128.95456(54)#	1999	550(100) ms	β^{+} (?%)	^{129}Pm	(1/2+,3/2+)		
^{129}Sm	62	67	128.95456(54)#	1999	550(100) ms	β^{+}, p (?%)	^{128}Nd	(1/2+,3/2+)		
^{130}Sm	62	68	129.94879(43)#	1999	1# s			0+		
^{131}Sm	62	69	130.94602(43)#	1986	1.2(2) s	β^{+}	^{131}Pm	5/2+#		
^{131}Sm	62	69	130.94602(43)#	1986	1.2(2) s	β^{+}, p (?%)	^{130}Nd	5/2+#		
^{132}Sm	62	70	131.94081(32)#	1989	4.0(3) s	β^{+}	^{132}Pm	0+		
^{133}Sm	62	71	132.93856(32)#	1977	2.89(16) s	β^{+} (?%)	^{133}Pm	(5/2+)		
^{133}Sm	62	71	132.93856(32)#	1977	2.89(16) s	β^{+}, p (?%)	^{132}Nd	(5/2+)		
^{133m}Sm	120(60)# keV			2001	3.5(4) s	β^{+}	^{133}Pm	(1/2−)		
^{134}Sm	62	72	133.93411(21)#	1977	9.5(8) s	β^{+}	^{134}Pm	0+		
^{135}Sm	62	73	134.93252(17)	1977	10.3(5) s	β^{+} (99.98%)	^{135}Pm	(7/2+)		
^{135}Sm	62	73	134.93252(17)	1977	10.3(5) s	β^{+}, p (0.02%)	^{134}Nd	(7/2+)		
^{136}Sm	62	74	135.928276(13)	1982	47(2) s	β^{+}	^{136}Pm	0+		
^{136m}Sm	2264.7(11) keV			1994	15(1) μs	IT	^{136}Sm	(8−)		
^{137}Sm	62	75	136.927008(31)	1986	45(1) s	β^{+}	^{137}Pm	(9/2−)		
^{138}Sm	62	76	137.923244(13)	1982	3.1(2) min	β^{+}	^{138}Pm	0+		
^{139}Sm	62	77	138.922297(12)	1971	2.57(10) min	β^{+}	^{139}Pm	1/2+		
^{139m}Sm	457.38(23) keV			1975	10.7(6) s	IT (93.7%)	^{139}Sm	11/2−		
^{139m}Sm	457.38(23) keV			1975	10.7(6) s	β^{+} (6.3%)	^{139}Pm	11/2−		
^{140}Sm	62	78	139.918995(13)	1967	14.82(12) min	β^{+}	^{140}Pm	0+		
^{141}Sm	62	79	140.9184815(92)	1967	10.2(2) min	β^{+}	^{141}Pm	1/2+		
^{141m}Sm	175.9(3) keV			1970	22.6(2) min	β^{+} (99.69%)	^{141}Pm	11/2−		
^{141m}Sm	175.9(3) keV			1970	22.6(2) min	IT (0.31%)	^{141}Sm	11/2−		
^{142}Sm	62	80	141.9152094(20)	1959	72.49(5) min	EC (>95%)	^{142}Pm	0+		
^{142}Sm	62	80	141.9152094(20)	1959	72.49(5) min	β^{+} (<5%)	^{142}Pm	0+		
^{142m1}Sm	2372.1(4) keV			1975	170(2) ns	IT	^{142}Sm	7−		
^{142m2}Sm	3662.2(7) keV			1981	480(60) ns	IT	^{142}Sm	10+		
^{143}Sm	62	81	142.9146348(30)	1956	8.75(6) min	EC (60.0%)	^{143}Pm	3/2+		
^{143}Sm	62	81	142.9146348(30)	1956	8.75(6) min	β^{+} (40.0%)	^{143}Pm	3/2+		
^{143m1}Sm	753.99(16) keV			1960	66(2) s	IT (99.76%)	^{143}Sm	11/2−		
^{143m1}Sm	753.99(16) keV			1960	66(2) s	β^{+} (0.24%)	^{143}Pm	11/2−		
^{143m2}Sm	2793.8(13) keV			1969	30(3) ms	IT	^{143}Sm	23/2−		
^{144}Sm	62	82	143.9120063(16)	1934	Observationally stable (Note: Believed to undergo β^{+}β^{+} decay to ^{144}Nd)			0+	0.0308(4)	
^{144m}Sm	2323.60(8) keV			1972	880(25) ns	IT	^{144}Sm	6+		
^{145}Sm	62	83	144.9134172(16)	1947	340(3) d	EC	^{145}Pm	7/2−		
^{145m}Sm	8815(1) keV			1993	3.52(16) μs	IT	^{145}Sm	49/2+		
^{146}Sm	62	84	145.9130468(33)	1953	9.20(26)×10^{7} y	α	^{142}Nd	0+	Trace	
^{147}Sm (Note: Primordial radioisotope) (Note: Fission product) (Note: Used in Samarium–neodymium dating)	62	85	146.9149044(14)	1933	1.066(5)×10^{11} y	α	^{143}Nd	7/2−	0.1500(14)	
^{148}Sm	62	86	147.9148292(13)	1933	6.3(13)×10^{15} y	α	^{144}Nd	0+	0.1125(9)	
^{149}Sm (Note: Neutron poison in reactors)	62	87	148.9171912(12)	1933	Observationally stable (Note: Believed to undergo α decay to ^{145}Nd with a half-life over 2×10^{15} years)			7/2−	0.1382(10)	
^{150}Sm	62	88	149.9172820(12)	1934	Observationally stable (Note: Believed to undergo α decay to ^{146}Nd)			0+	0.0737(9)	
^{151}Sm	62	89	150.9199389(12)	1947	94.6(6) y	β^{−}	^{151}Eu	5/2−		
^{151m}Sm	261.13(4) keV			1970	1.4(1) μs	IT	^{151}Sm	(11/2)−		
^{152}Sm	62	90	151.9197386(11)	1933	Observationally stable (Note: Believed to undergo α decay to ^{148}Nd)			0+	0.2674(9)	
^{153}Sm	62	91	152.9221036(11)	1938	46.2846(23) h	β^{−}	^{153}Eu	3/2+		
^{153m}Sm	98.39(10) keV			(1971) (Note: Only published in a conference proceeding and not a refereed journal.)	10.6(3) ms	IT	^{153}Sm	11/2−		
^{154}Sm	62	92	153.9222158(14)	1933	Observationally stable (Note: Believed to undergo β^{−}β^{−} decay to ^{154}Gd with a half-life over 2.3×10^{18} years)			0+	0.2274(14)	
^{155}Sm	62	93	154.9246466(14)	1951	22.18(6) min	β^{−}	^{155}Eu	3/2−		
^{155m1}Sm	16.5467(19) keV			2010	2.8(5) μs	IT	^{155}Sm	5/2+		
^{155m2}Sm	538.03(19) keV			2010	1.00(8) μs	IT	^{155}Sm	11/2−		
^{156}Sm	62	94	155.9255382(91)	1951	9.4(2) h	β^{−}	^{156}Eu	0+		
^{156m}Sm	1397.55(9) keV			1990	185(7) ns	IT	^{156}Sm	5−		
^{157}Sm	62	95	156.9284186(48)	1973	8.03(7) min	β^{−}	^{157}Eu	3/2−#		
^{158}Sm	62	96	157.9299493(51)	1970	5.30(3) min	β^{−}	^{158}Eu	0+		
^{159}Sm	62	97	158.9332171(64)	1986	11.37(15) s	β^{−}	^{159}Eu	5/2−		
^{159m}Sm	1276.5(8) keV			2009	116(8) ns	IT	^{159}Sm	(15/2+)		
^{160}Sm	62	98	159.9353370(21)	1986	9.6(3) s	β^{−}	^{160}Eu	0+		
^{160m1}Sm	1361.3(4) keV			2009	120(46) ns	IT	^{160}Sm	(5−)		
^{160m2}Sm	2757.3(4) keV			2016	1.8(4) μs	IT	^{160}Sm	(11+)		
^{161}Sm	62	99	160.9391601(73)	1998	4.8(4) s	β^{−}	^{161}Eu	7/2+#		
^{161m}Sm	1388.1(6) keV			2017	2.6(4) μs	IT	^{161}Sm	(17/2−)		
^{162}Sm	62	100	161.9416217(38)	2005	2.7(3) s	β^{−}	^{162}Eu	0+		
^{162m}Sm	1009.4(5) keV			2017	1.78(7) μs	IT	^{162}Sm	(4−)		
^{163}Sm	62	101	162.9456791(79)	2012	1.744+0.180 −0.204 s	β^{−}	^{163}Eu	1/2−#		
^{163}Sm	62	101	162.9456791(79)	2012	1.744+0.180 −0.204 s	β^{−}, n (<0.1%)	^{162}Eu	1/2−#		
^{164}Sm	62	102	163.9485501(44)	2012	1.422+0.54 −0.59 s	β^{−}	^{164}Eu	0+		
^{164}Sm	62	102	163.9485501(44)	2012	1.422+0.54 −0.59 s	β^{−}, n (<0.7%)	^{163}Eu	0+		
^{164m}Sm	1485.5(12) keV			2014	600(140) ns	IT	^{164}Sm	(6−)		
^{165}Sm	62	103	164.95329(43)#	2012	592+51 −55 ms	β^{−} (98.64%)	^{165}Eu	5/2−#		
^{165}Sm	62	103	164.95329(43)#	2012	592+51 −55 ms	β^{−}, n (1.36%)	^{164}Eu	5/2−#		
^{166}Sm	62	104	165.95658(43)#	2017	396+56 −63 ms	β^{−} (95.62%)	^{166}Eu	0+		
^{166}Sm	62	104	165.95658(43)#	2017	396+56 −63 ms	β^{−}, n (4.38%)	^{165}Eu	0+		
^{167}Sm	62	105	166.96207(54)#	2018	334+83 −78 ms	β^{−}	^{167}Eu	7/2−#		
^{167}Sm	62	105	166.96207(54)#	2018	334+83 −78 ms	β^{−}, n (<16%)	^{166}Eu	7/2−#		
^{168}Sm	62	106	167.96603(32)#	2022	353+210 −164 ms	β^{−}	^{168}Eu	0+#		
^{168}Sm	62	106	167.96603(32)#	2022	353+210 −164 ms	β^{−}, n (<21%)	^{167}Eu	0+#		
This table header & footer:

== Samarium-149 ==
Samarium-149 (^{149}Sm) is an observationally stable isotope of samarium (predicted to decay, but no decays have ever been observed, giving it a half-life at least several orders of magnitude longer than the age of the universe), and a product of the decay chain from the fission product ^{149}Nd (yield 1.0888%). ^{149}Sm is a neutron-absorbing nuclear poison with significant effect on nuclear reactor operation, second only to ^{135}Xe. Its neutron cross section is 40140 barns for thermal neutrons.

The equilibrium concentration (and thus the poisoning effect) builds to an equilibrium value in about 500 hours (about 20 days) of reactor operation, and since ^{149}Sm is stable, the concentration remains essentially constant during further reactor operation. This contrasts with xenon-135, which accumulates from the beta decay of iodine-135 (a short lived fission product) and has a high neutron cross section, but itself decays with a half-life of 9.2 hours (so does not remain in constant concentration long after the reactor shutdown), causing the so-called xenon pit.

== Samarium-151 ==
Medium-lived fission products
Nuclide	t_{1/2}	Yield	Q (Note: Decay energy is split among β, neutrino, and γ if any.)	βγ
	(a)	(%) (Note: Per 65 thermal neutron fissions of ^{235}U and 35 of ^{239}Pu.)	(keV)	
^{155}Eu	4.74	0.0803 (Note: Neutron poison; in thermal reactors, most is destroyed by further neutron capture.)	252	βγ
^{85}Kr	10.73	0.2180 (Note: Less than 1/4 of mass-85 fission products as most bypass ground state: ^{85}Br → ^{85m}Kr → ^{85}Rb.)	687	βγ
^{113m}Cd	13.9	0.0008	316	β
^{90}Sr	28.91	4.505	2826 (Note: Has decay energy 546 keV; its decay product ^{90}Y has decay energy 2.28 MeV with weak gamma branching.)	β
^{137}Cs	30.04	6.337	1176	βγ
^{121m}Sn	43.9	0.00005	390	βγ
^{151}Sm	94.6	0.5314	77	β

Yield, % per fission
	Thermal	Fast	14 MeV
^{232}Th	not fissile	0.399 ± 0.065	0.165 ± 0.035
^{233}U	0.333 ± 0.017	0.312 ± 0.014	0.49 ± 0.11
^{235}U	0.4204 ± 0.0071	0.431 ± 0.015	0.388 ± 0.061
^{238}U	not fissile	0.810 ± 0.012	0.800 ± 0.057
^{239}Pu	0.776 ± 0.018	0.797 ± 0.037	?
^{241}Pu	0.86 ± 0.24	0.910 ± 0.025	?

Samarium-151 (^{151}Sm) has a half-life of 94.6 years, undergoing low-energy beta decay, and has a fission product yield of 0.4203% for thermal neutrons and ^{235}U, about 39% of ^{149}Sm's yield. The yield is somewhat higher for ^{239}Pu.

Its neutron absorption cross section for thermal neutrons is high at 15200 barns, about 38% of ^{149}Sm's absorption cross section, or about 20 times that of ^{235}U. Since the ratios between the production and absorption rates of ^{151}Sm and ^{149}Sm are almost equal, the two isotopes should reach similar equilibrium concentrations. Since ^{149}Sm reaches equilibrium in about 500 hours (20 days), ^{151}Sm should reach equilibrium in about 50 days. As this is still much shorter than its radioactive half-life, decay will hardly affect this equilibrium while in the reactor.

Since nuclear fuel is used for several years (burnup) in a nuclear power plant, the final amount of ^{151}Sm in the spent nuclear fuel at discharge is only a small fraction of the total ^{151}Sm produced during the use of the fuel. According to one study, the mass fraction of ^{151}Sm in spent fuel is about 0.0025 for heavy loading of MOX fuel and about half that for uranium fuel, which is roughly two orders of magnitude less than the mass fraction of about 0.15 for the medium-lived fission product ^{137}Cs. The decay energy of ^{151}Sm is also about an order of magnitude less than that of ^{137}Cs. The low yield, low survival rate, and low decay energy mean that ^{151}Sm has insignificant nuclear waste impact compared to the two main medium-lived fission products ^{137}Cs and ^{90}Sr.

- ANL factsheet

== Samarium-153 ==
Samarium-153 (^{153}Sm) has a half-life of 46.285 hours, undergoing β^{−} decay into stable ^{153}Eu. As a component of samarium lexidronam, it is used in palliation of bone cancer. It is treated by the body in a similar manner to calcium, and it localizes selectively to bone.

== See also ==
Daughter products other than samarium

- Isotopes of europium
- Isotopes of promethium
- Isotopes of neodymium
