= Isotopes of neodymium =

Isotopes of neodymium (_{60}Nd)
Main isotopes			Decay	
Isotope	abundance	half-life (t_{1/2})	mode	product
^{140}Nd	synth	3.37 d	β^{+}	^{140}Pr
^{142}Nd	27.2%	stable		
^{143}Nd	12.2%	stable		
^{144}Nd	23.8%	2.29×10^{15} y	α	^{140}Ce
^{145}Nd	8.3%	stable		
^{146}Nd	17.2%	stable		
^{147}Nd	synth	10.98 d	β^{−}	^{147}Pm
^{148}Nd	5.80%	stable		
^{150}Nd	5.60%	9.3×10^{18} y	β^{−}β^{−}	^{150}Sm

Standard atomic weight A_{r}°(Nd)
- 144.242±0.003; 144.24±0.01 (abridged)

Naturally occurring neodymium (_{60}Nd) is composed of five stable isotopes, ^{142}Nd, ^{143}Nd, ^{145}Nd, ^{146}Nd and ^{148}Nd, with ^{142}Nd being the most abundant (27.2% natural abundance), and two long-lived radioisotopes, ^{144}Nd and ^{150}Nd. In all, 35 radioisotopes of neodymium have been characterized up to now, with the most stable being naturally occurring isotopes ^{144}Nd (alpha decay, a half-life (t_{1/2}) of 2.29×10^{15} years) and ^{150}Nd (double beta decay, t_{1/2} of 9.3×10^{18} years), and for practical purposes they can be considered to be stable as well. The radioactivity of ^{144}Nd is due to it having 84 neutrons (two more than 82, which is a magic number corresponding to a stable neutron configuration), and so it may emit an alpha particle (which has 2 neutrons) to form cerium-140 with 82 neutrons.

All of the remaining radioactive isotopes have half-lives that are less than 11 days, and the majority of these have half-lives that are less than 70 seconds. The most stable artificial isotope is ^{147}Nd, the parent of promethium, with a half-life of 10.98 days. This element also has 15 known meta states with the most stable being ^{139m}Nd (t_{1/2} 5.5 hours), ^{135m}Nd (t_{1/2} 5.5 minutes) and ^{133m1}Nd (t_{1/2} ~70 seconds).

The primary decay modes for isotopes lighter than the lightest and most abundant stable isotope, which is also the only theoretically stable isotope, ^{142}Nd, are electron capture and positron decay, and the primary mode for heavier radioisotopes is beta decay. The primary decay products for lighter radioisotopes are praseodymium isotopes and the primary products for heavier ones are promethium isotopes.

== Neodymium isotopes as fission products ==
Neodymium is one of the more common fission products that results from the splitting of uranium-233, uranium-235, plutonium-239 and plutonium-241. The distribution of resulting neodymium isotopes is distinctly different than those found in crustal rock formation on Earth. One of the methods used to verify that the Oklo Fossil Reactors in Gabon had produced a natural nuclear fission reactor some two billion years before present was to compare the relative abundances of neodymium isotopes found at the reactor site with those found elsewhere on Earth.

== List of isotopes ==
Nuclide (Note: ^{m}Nd – Excited nuclear isomer.)	Z	N	Isotopic mass (Da) (Note: ( ) – Uncertainty (1σ) is given in concise form in parentheses after the corresponding last digits.) (Note: # – Atomic mass marked #: value and uncertainty derived not from purely experimental data, but at least partly from trends from the Mass Surface (TMS).)	Discovery year	Half-life (Note: Bold half-life – nearly stable, half-life longer than age of universe.) (Note: # – Values marked # are not purely derived from experimental data, but at least partly from trends of neighboring nuclides (TNN).)	Decay mode (Note: Modes of decay: EC: / Electron capture; IT: / Isomeric transition; p: / Proton emission)	Daughter isotope (Note: Bold symbol as daughter – Daughter product is stable.)	Spin and parity (Note: ( ) spin value – Indicates spin with weak assignment arguments.)	Natural abundance (mole fraction)	
Nuclide	Excitation energy			Discovery year	Half-life	Decay mode	Daughter isotope	Spin and parity	Normal proportion	Range of variation
^{122}Nd	60	62		2026						
^{123}Nd	60	63		2025	>310 ns					
^{124}Nd	60	64	123.95187(54)#	2025	500# ms [>310 ns]			0+		
^{125}Nd	60	65	124.94840(43)#	1999	0.65(15) s	β^{+}	^{125}Pr	(5/2)(+#)		
^{125}Nd	60	65	124.94840(43)#	1999	0.65(15) s	β^{+}, p (?%)	^{124}Ce	(5/2)(+#)		
^{126}Nd	60	66	125.94269(32)#	2025	1# s [>310 ns]			0+		
^{127}Nd	60	67	126.93998(32)#	1983	1.8(4) s	β^{+}	^{127}Pr	5/2+#		
^{127}Nd	60	67	126.93998(32)#	1983	1.8(4) s	β^{+}, p (?%)	^{126}Ce	5/2+#		
^{128}Nd	60	68	127.93502(22)#	1985	5# s			0+		
^{129}Nd	60	69	128.93304(22)#	1977	6.8(6) s	β^{+}	^{129}Pr	7/2−		
^{129}Nd	60	69	128.93304(22)#	1977	6.8(6) s	β^{+}, p (?%)	^{128}Ce	7/2−		
^{129m1}Nd	17 keV			2010	2.6(4) s	β^{+}	^{129}Pr	1/2+		
^{129m1}Nd	17 keV			2010	2.6(4) s	β^{+}, p (?%)	^{128}Ce	1/2+		
^{129m2}Nd	39 keV			(2023) (Note: Half-life not measured, not included in the discovery database)	2.6(4) s	β^{+}	^{129}Pr	3/2+		
^{129m2}Nd	39 keV			(2023)	2.6(4) s	β^{+}, p (?%)	^{128}Ce	3/2+		
^{129m3}Nd	108 keV			(2023) (Note: Half-life shorter than 100ns, not included in discovery database)		IT (?%)	^{129m2}Nd	5/2+		
^{129m3}Nd	108 keV			(2023)		IT (?%)	^{129}Nd	5/2+		
^{129m4}Nd	1893 keV			(2023)		IT	^{129}Nd	(17/2+)		
^{129m5}Nd	2109 keV			(2023)		IT	^{129}Nd	(19/2+)		
^{129m6}Nd	2284 keV			2023	0.48(4) μs	IT	^{129}Nd	(21/2+)		
^{130}Nd	60	70	129.928506(30)	1977	21(3) s	β^{+}	^{130}Pr	0+		
^{131}Nd	60	71	130.927248(30)	1977	25.4(9) s	β^{+}	^{131}Pr	(5/2+)		
^{131}Nd	60	71	130.927248(30)	1977	25.4(9) s	β^{+}, p (?%)	^{130}Ce	(5/2+)		
^{132}Nd	60	72	131.923321(26)	1977	1.56(10) min	β^{+}	^{132}Pr	0+		
^{133}Nd	60	73	132.922348(50)	1977	70(10) s	β^{+}	^{133}Pr	(7/2+)		
^{133m1}Nd	127.97(12) keV			1995	~70 s	β^{+} (?%)	^{133}Pr	(1/2)+		
^{133m1}Nd	127.97(12) keV			1995	~70 s	IT (?%)	^{133}Nd	(1/2)+		
^{133m2}Nd	176.10(10) keV			1995	301(18) ns	IT	^{133}Nd	(9/2–)		
^{134}Nd	60	74	133.918790(13)	1970	8.5(15) min	β^{+}	^{134}Pr	0+		
^{134m}Nd	2293.0(4) keV			1972	389(17) μs	IT	^{134}Nd	8–		
^{135}Nd	60	75	134.918181(21)	1970	12.4(6) min	β^{+}	^{135}Pr	9/2–		
^{135m}Nd	64.95(24) keV			1972	5.5(5) min	β^{+}	^{135}Pr	(1/2+)		
^{136}Nd	60	76	135.914976(13)	1968	50.65(33) min	β^{+}	^{136}Pr	0+		
^{137}Nd	60	77	136.914563(13)	1970	38.5(15) min	β^{+}	^{137}Pr	1/2+		
^{137m}Nd	519.43(20) keV			1970	1.60(15) s	IT	^{137}Nd	11/2–		
^{138}Nd	60	78	137.911951(12)	1964	5.04(9) h	β^{+}	^{138}Pr	0+		
^{138m}Nd	3174.5(4) keV			1975	370(5) ns	IT	^{138}Nd	10+		
^{139}Nd	60	79	138.911951(30)	1951	29.7(5) min	β^{+}	^{139}Pr	3/2+		
^{139m1}Nd	231.16(5) keV			1967	5.50(20) h	β^{+} (87.0%)	^{139}Pr	11/2–		
^{139m1}Nd	231.16(5) keV			1967	5.50(20) h	IT (13.0%)	^{139}Nd	11/2–		
^{139m2}Nd	2616.9(6) keV			2008	276.8(18) ns	IT	^{139}Nd	23/2		
^{140}Nd	60	80	139.9095461(35)	1949	3.37(2) d	EC	^{140}Pr	0+		
^{140m1}Nd	2221.65(9) keV			1962	600(50) μs	IT	^{140}Nd	7–		
^{140m2}Nd	7435.1(4) keV			2006	1.22(6) μs	IT	^{140}Nd	20+		
^{141}Nd	60	81	140.9096167(34)	1949	2.49(3) h	EC (97.28%)	^{141}Pr	3/2+		
^{141}Nd	60	81	140.9096167(34)	1949	2.49(3) h	β^{+} (2.72%)	^{141}Pr	3/2+		
^{141m}Nd	756.51(5) keV			1960	62.0(8) s	IT (99.97%)	^{141}Nd	11/2–		
^{141m}Nd	756.51(5) keV			1960	62.0(8) s	β^{+} (0.032%)	^{141}Pr	11/2–		
^{142}Nd	60	82	141.9077288(13)	1924	Stable			0+	0.27153(40)	
^{142m}Nd	2209.303(21) keV			1964	18.6(37) μs	IT	^{142}Nd	6+		
^{143}Nd (Note: Fission product)	60	83	142.9098198(13)	1933	Observationally Stable (Note: Believed to undergo α decay to ^{139}Ce with a half-life over 1.1×10^{20} years)			7/2−	0.12173(26)	
^{144}Nd (Note: Primordial radionuclide)	60	84	143.9100928(13)	1924	2.29(16)×10^{15} y	α	^{140}Ce	0+	0.23798(19)	
^{145}Nd	60	85	144.9125792(14)	1933	Observationally Stable (Note: Believed to undergo α decay to ^{141}Ce with a half-life of over 6.1×10^{19} years)			7/2−	0.08293(12)	
^{146}Nd	60	86	145.9131225(14)	1924	Observationally Stable (Note: Believed to undergo β^{−}β^{−} decay to ^{146}Sm, or α decay to ^{142}Ce with a half-life of over 3.3×10^{21} years)			0+	0.17189(32)	
^{147}Nd	60	87	146.9161060(14)	1947	10.98(1) d	β^{−}	^{147}Pm	5/2−		
^{148}Nd	60	88	147.9168990(22)	1937	Observationally Stable (Note: Believed to undergo β^{−}β^{−} decay to ^{148}Sm with a half-life over 3×10^{18} years, or α decay to ^{144}Ce with a half-life of over 1.2×10^{19} years)			0+	0.05756(21)	
^{149}Nd	60	89	148.9201546(22)	1938	1.728(1) h	β^{−}	^{149}Pm	5/2−		
^{150}Nd	60	90	149.9209013(12)	1937	9.3(7)×10^{18} y	β^{−}β^{−}	^{150}Sm	0+	0.05638(28)	
^{151}Nd	60	91	150.9238394(12)	1938	12.44(7) min	β^{−}	^{151}Pm	3/2+		
^{152}Nd	60	92	151.924691(26)	1969	11.4(2) min	β^{−}	^{152}Pm	0+		
^{153}Nd	60	93	152.9277179(29)	1987	31.6(10) s	β^{−}	^{153}Pm	(3/2)−		
^{153m}Nd	191.71(16) keV			1996	1.10(4) μs	IT	^{153}Nd	(5/2)+		
^{154}Nd	60	94	153.9295974(11)	1970	25.9(2) s	β^{−}	^{154}Pm	0+		
^{154m}Nd	1297.9(4) keV			2009	3.2(3) μs	IT	^{154}Nd	(4−)		
^{155}Nd	60	95	154.9331356(98)	1986	8.9(2) s	β^{−}	^{155}Pm	(3/2−)		
^{156}Nd	60	96	155.9353704(14)	1987	5.06(13) s	β^{−}	^{156}Pm	0+		
^{156m}Nd	1431.3(4) keV			1998	365(145) ns	IT	^{156}Nd	5−		
^{157}Nd	60	97	156.9393511(23)	2012	1.17(4) s	β^{−}	^{157}Pm	5/2−#		
^{158}Nd	60	98	157.9422056(14)	2012	810(30) ms	β^{−}	^{158}Pm	0+		
^{158m}Nd	1648.1(14) keV			2016	339(20) ns	IT	^{158}Nd	(6−)		
^{159}Nd	60	99	158.946619(32)	2012	500(30) ms	β^{−}	^{159}Pm	7/2+#		
^{160}Nd	60	100	159.949839(50)	2012	439(37) ms	β^{−}	^{160}Pm	0+		
^{160m}Nd	1107.9(9) keV			2016	1.63(21) μs	IT	^{160}Nd	(4−)		
^{161}Nd	60	101	160.95466(43)#	2012	215(76) ms	β^{−}	^{161}Pm	1/2−#		
^{162}Nd	60	102	161.95812(43)#	2017	310(200) ms	β^{−}	^{162}Pm	0+		
^{163}Nd	60	103	162.96341(54)#	2018	80# ms [>550 ns]			5/2−#		
This table header & footer:

== See also ==
Daughter products other than neodymium

- Isotopes of samarium
- Isotopes of promethium
- Isotopes of praseodymium
- Isotopes of cerium
