= Isotopes of lanthanum =

Isotopes

Isotopes of lanthanum (_{57}La)
| Main isotopes | | | Decay | |
| Isotope | abundance | half-life (t_{1/2}) | mode | product |
|---|---|---|---|---|
| ^{137}La | synth | 6×10^{4} y | ε | ^{137}Ba |
| ^{138}La | 0.089 | 1.03×10^{11} y | β^{+} | ^{138}Ba |
| ^{138}La | 0.089 | 1.03×10^{11} y | β^{−} | ^{138}Ce |
| ^{139}La | 99.911 | stable | | |
| ^{140}La | synth | 40.289 h | β^{−} | ^{140}Ce |

Standard atomic weight A_{r}°(La)
- 138.90547±0.00007; 138.91±0.01 (abridged)

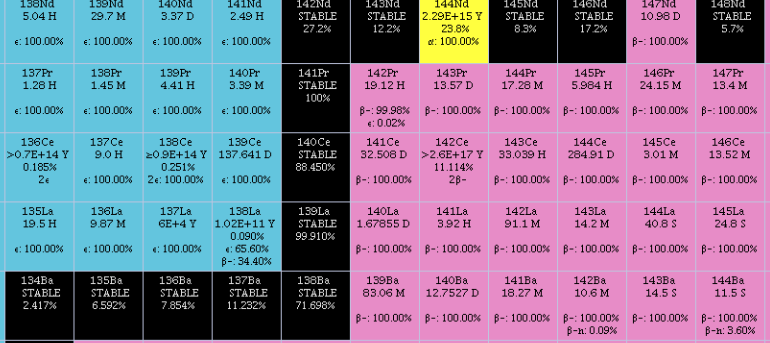
Stable Z/N chart of La and Ba

Naturally occurring lanthanum (_{57}La) is composed of one stable (^{139}La) and one radioactive (^{138}La) isotope, with the stable isotope, ^{139}La, being the most abundant (99.911% natural abundance). There are 39 radioisotopes that have been characterized, with the most stable being ^{138}La, with a half-life of 1.03×10^{11} years; ^{137}La, with a half-life of 60,000 years and ^{140}La, with a half-life of 40.289 hours. The remaining radioactive isotopes have half-lives that are less than a day and the majority of these less than a minute. This element also has 12 nuclear isomers, the longest-lived of which is ^{132m}La, with a half-life of 24.3 minutes. Lighter isotopes mostly decay to isotopes of barium and heavy ones mostly decay to isotopes of cerium. ^{138}La can decay to both.

The known isotopes of lanthanum range from ^{116}La to ^{158}La.

== List of isotopes ==
| Nuclide (Note: ^{m}La – Excited nuclear isomer.) | Z | N | Isotopic mass (Da) (Note: ( ) – Uncertainty (1σ) is given in concise form in parentheses after the corresponding last digits.) (Note: # – Atomic mass marked #: value and uncertainty derived not from purely experimental data, but at least partly from trends from the Mass Surface (TMS).) | Discovery year | Half-life (Note: Bold half-life – nearly stable, half-life longer than age of universe.) (Note: # – Values marked # are not purely derived from experimental data, but at least partly from trends of neighboring nuclides (TNN).) | Decay mode (Note: Modes of decay: EC: / Electron capture; IT: / Isomeric transition; n: / Neutron emission; p: / Proton emission) | Daughter isotope (Note: Bold italics symbol as daughter – Daughter product is nearly stable.) (Note: Bold symbol as daughter – Daughter product is stable.) | Spin and parity (Note: ( ) spin value – Indicates spin with weak assignment arguments.) | Natural abundance (mole fraction) | |
| Nuclide | Excitation energy | | | Discovery year | Half-life | Decay mode | Daughter isotope | Spin and parity | Normal proportion | Range of variation |
|---|---|---|---|---|---|---|---|---|---|---|
| ^{116}La | 57 | 59 | 115.95701(35)# | 2022 | 50(22) ms | p (~60%) | ^{115}Ba | | | |
| ^{116}La | 57 | 59 | 115.95701(35)# | 2022 | 50(22) ms | β^{+} (~40%) | ^{116}Ba | | | |
| ^{116m}La | 182 keV | | | 2022 | 2.0+2.8 −0.8 μs | IT | ^{116}La | | | |
| ^{117}La | 57 | 60 | 116.95033(22)# | 2001 | 21.6(31) ms | p (94%) | ^{116}Ba | (3/2+) | | |
| ^{117}La | 57 | 60 | 116.95033(22)# | 2001 | 21.6(31) ms | β^{+} (6%) | ^{117}Ba | (3/2+) | | |
| ^{117m}La | 192 keV | | | 2022 | 2.7+1.3 −0.7 μs | IT | ^{117}La | (7/2−) | | |
| ^{118}La | 57 | 61 | 117.94673(32)# | 2025 | 200# ms [>310 ns] | | | 1−# | | |
| ^{119}La | 57 | 62 | 118.94093(32)# | 2025 | 1# s [>310 ns] | | | 11/2−# | | |
| ^{120}La | 57 | 63 | 119.93820(32)# | 1984 | 2.8(2) s | β^{+} | ^{120}Ba | 4+ | | |
| ^{120}La | 57 | 63 | 119.93820(32)# | 1984 | 2.8(2) s | β^{+}, p (?%) | ^{119}Cs | 4+ | | |
| ^{121}La | 57 | 64 | 120.93324(32)# | 1988 | 5.3(2) s | β^{+} | ^{121}Ba | 11/2−# | | |
| ^{122}La | 57 | 65 | 121.93071(32)# | 1984 | 8.6(5) s | β^{+} | ^{122}Ba | 2+ | | |
| ^{122}La | 57 | 65 | 121.93071(32)# | 1984 | 8.6(5) s | β^{+}, p (?%) | ^{121}Cs | 2+ | | |
| ^{123}La | 57 | 66 | 122.92630(21)# | 1978 | 17(3) s | β^{+} | ^{123}Ba | 11/2−# | | |
| ^{124}La | 57 | 67 | 123.924574(61) | 1978 | 29.21(17) s | β^{+} | ^{124}Ba | (7−, 8−) | | |
| ^{124m}La (Note: Order of ground state and isomer is uncertain.) | 100(100)# keV | | | 1997 | 21(4) s | β^{+} | ^{124}Ba | 2−# | | |
| ^{125}La | 57 | 68 | 124.920816(28) | 1973 | 64.8(12) s | β^{+} | ^{125}Ba | 11/2−# | | |
| ^{125m}La | 107.00(10) keV | | | 1999 | 390(40) ms | IT | ^{125}La | (3/2+) | | |
| ^{126}La | 57 | 69 | 125.919513(97) | 1961 | 54(2) s | β^{+} | ^{126}Ba | 5−# | | |
| ^{126m}La | 210(410) keV | | | 1998 | 20(20) s | β^{+} | ^{126}Ba | 1−# | | |
| ^{127}La | 57 | 70 | 126.916375(28) | 1963 | 5.1(1) min | β^{+} | ^{127}Ba | (11/2−) | | |
| ^{127m}La | 14.2(4) keV | | | 1973 | 3.7(4) min | β^{+} | ^{127}Ba | (3/2+) | | |
| ^{128}La | 57 | 71 | 127.915592(58) | 1961 | 5.18(14) min | β^{+} | ^{128}Ba | (5+) | | |
| ^{128m}La | 100(100)# keV | | | 1997 | < 1.4 min | β^{+} | ^{128}Ba | (1+, 2−) | | |
| ^{129}La | 57 | 72 | 128.912696(23) | 1963 | 11.6(2) min | β^{+} | ^{129}Ba | (3/2+) | | |
| ^{129m}La | 172.33(20) keV | | | 1969 | 560(50) ms | IT | ^{129}La | (11/2−) | | |
| ^{130}La | 57 | 73 | 129.912369(28) | 1961 | 8.7(1) min | β^{+} | ^{130}Ba | 3(+) | | |
| ^{130m}La | 214.0(5) keV | | | 2012 | 742(28) ns | IT | ^{130}La | (5+) | | |
| ^{131}La | 57 | 74 | 130.910070(30) | 1951 | 59(2) min | β^{+} | ^{131}Ba | 3/2+ | | |
| ^{131m}La | 304.52(24) keV | | | 1966 | 170(10) μs | IT | ^{131}La | 11/2− | | |
| ^{132}La | 57 | 75 | 131.910119(39) | 1951 | 4.59(4) h | β^{+} | ^{132}Ba | 2− | | |
| ^{132m}La | 188.20(11) keV | | | 1969 | 24.3(5) min | IT (76%) | ^{132}La | 6− | | |
| ^{132m}La | 188.20(11) keV | | | 1969 | 24.3(5) min | β^{+} (24%) | ^{132}Ba | 6− | | |
| ^{133}La | 57 | 76 | 132.908218(30) | 1950 | 3.912(8) h | β^{+} | ^{133}Ba | 5/2+ | | |
| ^{134}La | 57 | 77 | 133.908514(21) | 1951 | 6.45(16) min | β^{+} | ^{134}Ba | 1+ | | |
| ^{134m}La | 440(100)# keV | | | 1985 | 29(4) μs | IT | ^{134}La | (6−) | | |
| ^{135}La | 57 | 78 | 134.906984(10) | 1948 | 18.91(2) h | β^{+} | ^{135}Ba | 5/2+ | | |
| ^{136}La | 57 | 79 | 135.907635(57) | 1950 | 9.87(3) min | β^{+} | ^{136}Ba | 1+ | | |
| ^{136m1}La | 259.5(3) keV | | | 1966 | 114(5) ms | IT | ^{136}La | (7−) | | |
| ^{136m2}La | 2520.6(4) keV | | | 2015 | 187(27) ns | IT | ^{136}La | (14+) | | |
| ^{137}La | 57 | 80 | 136.9064504(18) | 1948 | 6(2)×10^{4} y | EC | ^{137}Ba | 7/2+ | | |
| ^{137m}La | 1869.50(21) keV | | | 1982 | 342(25) ns | IT | ^{137}La | 19/2− | | |
| ^{138}La (Note: Primordial radionuclide) | 57 | 81 | 137.90712404(45) | 1947 | 1.03(1)×10^{11} y | β^{+} (65.5%) | ^{138}Ba | 5+ | 8.881(71)×10^{−4} | |
| ^{138}La | 57 | 81 | 137.90712404(45) | 1947 | 1.03(1)×10^{11} y | β^{−} (34.5%) | ^{138}Ce | 5+ | 8.881(71)×10^{−4} | |
| ^{138m1}La | 72.57(3) keV | | | 1975 | 116(5) ns | IT | ^{138}La | (3)+ | | |
| ^{138m2}La | 738.80(20) keV | | | 2014 | 2.0(3) μs | IT | ^{138}La | 7− | | |
| ^{139}La (Note: Fission product) | 57 | 82 | 138.90636293(65) | 1924 | Stable | | | 7/2+ | 0.9991119(71) | |
| ^{139m}La | 1800.4(4) keV | | | 2012 | 315(35) ns | IT | ^{139}La | (17/2+) | | |
| ^{140}La | 57 | 83 | 139.90948729(65) | 1935 | 40.289(4) h | β^{−} | ^{140}Ce | 3− | | |
| ^{141}La | 57 | 84 | 140.9109712(44) | 1951 | 3.92(3) h | β^{−} | ^{141}Ce | (7/2+) | | |
| ^{142}La | 57 | 85 | 141.9140908(67) | 1953 | 91.1(5) min | β^{−} | ^{142}Ce | 2− | | |
| ^{142m}La | 145.82(8) keV | | | 1983 | 0.87(17) μs | IT | ^{142}La | (4)− | | |
| ^{143}La | 57 | 86 | 142.9160795(79) | 1951 | 14.2(1) min | β^{−} | ^{143}Ce | (7/2)+ | | |
| ^{144}La | 57 | 87 | 143.919646(14) | 1967 | 44.0(7) s | β^{−} | ^{144}Ce | (3−) | | |
| ^{145}La | 57 | 88 | 144.921808(13) | 1974 | 24.8(20) s | β^{−} | ^{145}Ce | (5/2+) | | |
| ^{146}La | 57 | 89 | 145.9256880(18) | 1974 | 9.9(1) s | β^{−} | ^{146}Ce | (5−) | | |
| ^{146m}La | 141.5(24) keV | | | 1979 | 6.08(22) s | β^{−} | ^{146}Ce | (1−, 2−) | | |
| ^{147}La | 57 | 90 | 146.928418(12) | 1979 | 4.026(20) s | β^{−} (99.96%) | ^{147}Ce | (5/2+) | | |
| ^{147}La | 57 | 90 | 146.928418(12) | 1979 | 4.026(20) s | β^{−}, n (0.041%) | ^{146}Ce | (5/2+) | | |
| ^{148}La | 57 | 91 | 147.932679(21) | 1982 | 1.414(25) s | β^{−} (99.82%) | ^{148}Ce | (2−) | | |
| ^{148}La | 57 | 91 | 147.932679(21) | 1982 | 1.414(25) s | β^{−}, n (0.18%) | ^{147}Ce | (2−) | | |
| ^{149}La | 57 | 92 | 148.93535(21) | 1979 | 1.071(22) s | β^{−} (98.57%) | ^{149}Ce | (3/2−) | | |
| ^{149}La | 57 | 92 | 148.93535(21) | 1979 | 1.071(22) s | β^{−}, n (1.43%) | ^{148}Ce | (3/2−) | | |
| ^{150}La | 57 | 93 | 149.9395475(27) | 1993 | 504(15) ms | β^{−} (97.3%) | ^{150}Ce | (3+) | | |
| ^{150}La | 57 | 93 | 149.9395475(27) | 1993 | 504(15) ms | β^{−}, n (2.7%) | ^{149}Ce | (3+) | | |
| ^{151}La | 57 | 94 | 150.94277(47) | 1994 | 465(24) ms | β^{−} | ^{151}Ce | 1/2+# | | |
| ^{152}La | 57 | 95 | 151.94709(32)# | 1994 | 287(16) ms | β^{−} | ^{152}Ce | 2−# | | |
| ^{153}La | 57 | 96 | 152.95055(32)# | 1994 | 245(18) ms | β^{−} | ^{153}Ce | 1/2+# | | |
| ^{154}La | 57 | 97 | 153.95542(32)# | 2017 | 161(15) ms | β^{−} | ^{154}Ce | 2−# | | |
| ^{155}La | 57 | 98 | 154.95928(43)# | 2017 | 101(28) ms | β^{−} | ^{155}Ce | 1/2+# | | |
| ^{156}La | 57 | 99 | 155.96452(43)# | 2017 | 84(78) ms | β^{−} | ^{156}Ce | 4+# | | |
| ^{157}La | 57 | 100 | 156.96879(32)# | 2018 | 30# ms [> 550 ns] | | | 1/2+# | | |
| ^{158}La | 57 | 101 | | 2026 | | | | | | |
This table header & footer:

== See also ==
Daughter products other than lanthanum

- Isotopes of cerium
- Isotopes of barium
- Isotopes of caesium
