= Alpha nuclide =

Nuclide made up of alpha particles

An alpha nuclide is a nuclide that consists of an integer number of alpha particles. Alpha nuclides have equal, even numbers of protons and neutrons; they are important in stellar nucleosynthesis since the energetic environment within stars is amenable to fusion of alpha particles into heavier nuclei. Stable alpha nuclides, and stable decay products of radioactive alpha nuclides, are some of the most common metals in the universe.

Alpha nuclide is also short for alpha-emitting nuclide, referring to those radioactive isotopes that undergo alpha decay and thereby emit alpha particles.

== List of alpha nuclides ==
The entries for ^{36}Ar and ^{40}Ca are theoretical: they would release energy on decay, but the process has never been observed, and the half-lives are probably extremely long. Likewise, the chains for masses 64, 84, 92, and 96 theoretically can continue one more step by double electron capture (to ^{64}Ni, ^{84}Kr, ^{92}Zr, and ^{96}Mo respectively), but this has never been observed.

Alpha number	Nuclide	Stability	Decay mode	Half-life	Product(s) of decay (bold is stable)	Alpha decay energy (MeV)
1	^{4}_{2}He	Stable				
2	^{8}_{4}Be	Radioactive	α	8.19(37)×10^{−17} s	^{4}_{2}He	+0.09184
3	^{12}_{6}C	Stable				−7.36659
4	^{16}_{8}O	Stable				−7.16192
5	^{20}_{10}Ne	Stable				−4.72985
6	^{24}_{12}Mg	Stable				−9.31656
7	^{28}_{14}Si	Stable				−9.98414
8	^{32}_{16}S	Stable				−6.94766
9	^{36}_{18}Ar	Observationally Stable	(ECEC)	never seen	(^{36}_{16}S)	−6.64092
10	^{40}_{20}Ca	Observationally Stable	(ECEC)	never seen	(^{40}_{18}Ar)	−7.03978
11	^{44}_{22}Ti	Radioactive	EC	60.0(11) y	^{44}_{21}Sc → ^{44}_{20}Ca	−5.1271
12	^{48}_{24}Cr	Radioactive	β^{+}	21.56(3) h	^{48}_{23}V → ^{48}_{22}Ti	−7.698
13	^{52}_{26}Fe	Radioactive	β^{+}	8.275(8) h	^{52m}_{25}Mn → ^{52}_{24}Cr	−7.936
14	^{56}_{28}Ni	Radioactive	β^{+}	6.075(10) d	^{56}_{27}Co → ^{56}_{26}Fe	−8.0005
15	^{60}_{30}Zn	Radioactive	β^{+}	2.38(5) min	^{60}_{29}Cu → ^{60}_{28}Ni	−2.6917
16	^{64}_{32}Ge	Radioactive	β^{+}	63.7(25) s	^{64}_{31}Ga → ^{64}_{30}Zn	−2.566
17	^{68}_{34}Se	Radioactive	β^{+}	35.5(7) s	^{68}_{33}As → ... → ^{68}_{30}Zn	−2.299
18	^{72}_{36}Kr	Radioactive	β^{+}	17.16(18) s	^{72}_{35}Br → ... → ^{72}_{32}Ge	−2.176
19	^{76}_{38}Sr	Radioactive	β^{+}	7.89(7) s	^{76}_{37}Rb → ... → ^{76}_{34}Se	−2.73
20	^{80}_{40}Zr	Radioactive	β^{+}	4.6(6) s	^{80}_{39}Y → ... → ^{80}_{36}Kr	−3.70
21	^{84}_{42}Mo	Radioactive	β^{+}	3.8(9) ms	^{84}_{41}Nb → ... → ^{84}_{38}Sr	−2.71
22	^{88}_{44}Ru	Radioactive	β^{+}	1.3(3) s	^{88}_{43}Tc → ... → ^{88}_{38}Sr	−2.27
23	^{92}_{46}Pd	Radioactive	β^{+}	1.1(3) s	^{92}_{45}Rh → ... → ^{92}_{42}Mo	−2.28
24	^{96}_{48}Cd	Radioactive	β^{+}	1.003(47) s	^{96}_{47}Ag → ... → ^{96}_{44}Ru	−3.03
25	^{100}_{50}Sn	Radioactive	β^{+}	1.1(4) s	^{100}_{49}In → ... → ^{100}_{44}Ru	−3.47
26	^{104}_{52}Te	Radioactive	α	7.2+2.3 −1.5 ns (Note: This appears reliable but the NUBASE2020 value is <4 ns and the discrepancy is yet to be explained.)	^{100}_{50}Sn → ... → ^{100}_{44}Ru	+5.10
27	^{108}_{54}Xe	Radioactive	α	58^{+106}_{−23} μs	^{104}_{52}Te → ^{100}_{50}Sn → ... → ^{100}_{44}Ru	+4.57

As of 2024, the heaviest known alpha nuclide is xenon-108.
