= Radionuclide generator =

Device for creating radionuclides

A radionuclide generator is a device which provides a local supply of a short-lived radioactive substance from the decay of a longer-lived parent radionuclide. They are commonly used in nuclear medicine to supply a radiopharmacy. The generator provides a way to separate the desired product from the parent, in a process that can be repeated a number of times over the life of the parent, as needed.

Use of a generator avoids the challenge of distributing short-lived radionuclides from the original production site (a nuclear reactor or cyclotron) to individual users; the loss of activity due to decay in transit can result in too little being supplied or the need for much larger initial quantities to be sent out (incurring additional production and transport costs). In many case an alternative to generator use is an on-site cyclotron producing the desired isotope; it is feasible to have cyclotrons at larger centres, but they are much more expensive and complex than generators. Even if the medical radionuclide's life is not that short, a generator may be used because of the low-cost availability of the parent, as with the strontium-90/yttrium-90 system.

Long-lived radionuclides which are administered to a patient with a view to utilising useful properties of a daughter product have been termed in-vivo generators, though they are not now routinely used clinically.

== Commercial and experimental generators ==
	Parent	(half-life)	Daughter	(half-life)
Technetium generator	^{99}Mo	2.75 days	^{99m}Tc	6.01 hours
Gallium generator	^{68}Ge	271.05 days	^{68}Ga	67.8 minutes
Rubidium generator	^{82}Sr	25.35 days	^{82}Rb	1.26 minutes
Copper generator	^{62}Zn	9.19 hours	^{62}Cu	9.67 minutes
Krypton generator	^{81}Rb	4.572 hours	^{81m}Kr	13.1 seconds
Yttrium generator	^{90}Sr	28.91 years	^{90}Y	64 hours
Rhenium generator	^{188}W	69.77 days	^{188}Re	17.0 hours
