= Gallium scan =

Nuclear medicine test that uses gallium to obtain images of tissues

Gallium-67 scan
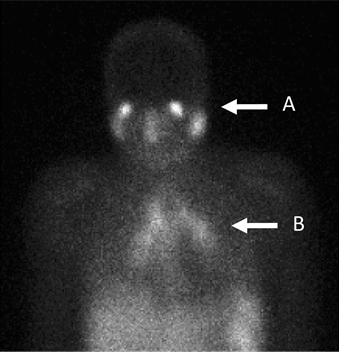
- Gallium scan showing uptake consistent with sarcoidosis
- Synonyms: Gallium imaging
- ICD-10-PCS: C?1?LZZ (planar) C?2?LZZ (tomographic)
- ICD-9-CM: 92.18
- OPS-301 code: 3-70c
- MedlinePlus: 003450

A gallium scan is a type of nuclear medicine diagnostic investigation that uses either a gallium-67 (^{67}Ga) or gallium-68 (^{68}Ga) radiopharmaceutical to obtain images of a specific type of tissue, or disease state of tissue. The gamma emission of gallium-67 is imaged by a gamma camera, while the positron emission of gallium-68 is imaged by positron emission tomography (PET). Gallium salts like gallium citrate and gallium nitrate may be used. The form of salt is not important, since it is the freely dissolved gallium ion Ga^{3+} which is active. As they are isotopic, Both ^{67}Ga and ^{68}Ga salts have the same uptake mechanisms. The gallium(III) is rapidly bound by transferrin, which then preferentially accumulates in tumors, inflammation, and both acute and chronic infection, allowing these pathological processes to be imaged. Gallium is particularly useful in imaging osteomyelitis that involves the spine, and in imaging older and chronic infections that may be the cause of a fever of unknown origin. Due to lack of disease specificity, imaging with radioactive gallium(III) salts or complexes, such as ^{67}Ga citrate, has gradually become less important over time and is rarely used these days.

However, the mentioned gallium(III) radionuclides, particularly ^{68}Ga, are frequently used as radiolabels for peptides, proteins, oligonucleotides, drugs, and drug-like substance, turning these from regular pharmaceuticals into radiotracers. A popular class of such radiopharmaceuticals is formed by ^{68}Ga-labeled small-molecule inhibitors for prostate-specific membrane antigen (PSMA), which are increasingly used for prostate cancer imaging. Furthermore, Gallium-68 labeled octreotide analogs, such as ^{68}Ga-DOTATOC, were among the first clinically successful ^{68}Ga PET tracers and have meanwhile replaced indium-111 labeled octreotides for diagnostic imaging of somatostatin receptor positive neuroendocrine tumors. Investigations with ^{68}Ga-labeled peptides etc. are however not commonly referred to as 'gallium scan'. Usually they are named after the addressed target or labeled bioligand, e.g., 'PSMA scan' or 'DOTATOC scan'.

== Gallium citrate scan ==
In the past, the gallium scan was the gold standard for lymphoma staging, until it was replaced by positron emission tomography (PET) using ^{18}F-fluorodeoxyglucose (FDG). ^{67}Ga-citrate imaging is still used to image inflammation and chronic infections, and it still sometimes locates unsuspected tumors as it is taken up by many kinds of cancer cells in amounts that exceed those of normal tissues. Thus, an increased uptake of gallium-67 may indicate a new or old infection, an inflammatory focus from any cause, or a cancerous tumor.

It has been suggested that gallium imaging may become an obsolete technique, with indium leukocyte imaging and technetium antigranulocyte antibodies replacing it as a detection mechanism for infections. For detection of tumors, especially lymphomas, gallium-67 imaging is still in use, but may be completely replaced by Fluorodeoxyglucose18F-fluorodeoxyglucose PET imaging in the future.

In infections, the gallium scan has an advantage over indium leukocyte imaging in imaging osteomyelitis (bone infection) of the spine, lung infections and inflammation, and for chronic infections. In part this is because gallium binds to neutrophil membranes, even after neutrophil death. Indium leukocyte imaging is better for acute infections (where neutrophils are still rapidly and actively localizing to the infection), and also for osteomyelitis that does not involve the spine, and for abdominal and pelvic infections. Both the gallium scan and indium leukocyte imaging may be used to image fever of unknown origin (elevated temperature without an explanation). However, the indium leukocyte scan will image only the 25% of such cases which are caused by acute infections, while gallium will also localize to other sources of fever, such as chronic infections and tumors.

=== Mechanism ===
The body generally handles Ga^{3+} as though it were ferric iron (Fe^{3+}), and thus the free ion is bound (and concentrates) in areas of inflammation, such as an infection site, and also areas of rapid cell division. Gallium (III) (Ga^{3+}) binds to transferrin, leukocyte lactoferrin, bacterial siderophores, inflammatory proteins, and cell-membranes in neutrophils, both living and dead.

Lactoferrin is contained within leukocytes. Gallium may bind to lactoferrin and be transported to sites of inflammation, or binds to lactoferrin released during bacterial phagocytosis at infection sites (and remains due to binding with macrophage receptors). Gallium-67 also attaches to the siderophore molecules of bacteria themselves, and for this reason can be used in leukopenic patients with bacterial infection (here it attaches directly to bacterial proteins, and leukocytes are not needed). Uptake is thought to be associated with a range of tumour properties including transferring receptors, anaerobic tumor metabolism and tumor perfusion and vascular permeability.

=== Common indications ===
- Whole-body survey to localize source of fever in patients with fever of unknown origin.
- Detection of pulmonary and mediastinal inflammation/infection, especially in the immunocompromised patient.
- Evaluation and follow-up of active lymphocytic or granulomatous inflammatory processes such as sarcoidosis or tuberculosis.
- Diagnosing vertebral osteomyelitis and/or disk space infection where gallium-67 is preferred over labeled leukocytes.
- Diagnosis and follow-up of medical treatment of retroperitoneal fibrosis.
- Evaluation and follow-up of drug-induced pulmonary toxicity (e.g. Bleomycin, Amiodarone)
- Evaluation of patients who are not candidates for WBC scans (WBC count less than 6,000).

Note that all of these conditions are also seen in PET scans using gallium-68.

=== Technique ===
The main (^{67}Ga) technique uses scintigraphy to produce two-dimensional images. After the tracer has been injected, images are typically taken by a gamma camera at 24, 48, and in some cases, 72, and 96 hours later. Each set of images takes 30–60 minutes, depending on the size of the area being imaged. The resulting image will have bright areas that collected large amounts of tracer, because inflammation is present or rapid cell division is occurring. Single-photon emission computed tomography (SPECT) images may also be acquired. In some imaging centers, SPECT images may be combined with computed tomography (CT) scan using either fusion software or SPECT/CT hybrid cameras to superimpose both physiological image-information from the gallium scan, and anatomical information from the CT scan.

A common injection dose is around 150 megabecquerels. Imaging should not usually be sooner than 24 hours as high background at this time produces false negatives. Forty-eight-hour whole body images are appropriate. Delayed imaging can be obtained even 1 week or longer after injection if bowel is confounding. SPECT can be performed as needed. Oral laxatives or enemas can be given before imaging to reduce bowel activity and reduce dose to large bowel; however, the usefulness of bowel preparation is controversial.

10% to 25% of the dose of gallium-67 is excreted within 24 hours after injection (the majority of which is excreted through the kidneys). After 24 hours the principal excretory pathway is the colon. The "target organ" (organ that receives the largest radiation dose in the average scan) is the colon (large bowel).

In a normal scan, uptake of gallium is seen in wide range of locations which do not indicate a positive finding. These typically include soft tissues, liver, and bone. Other sites of localisation can be nasopharyngeal and lacrimal glands, breasts (particularly in lactation or pregnancy), normally healing wounds, kidneys, bladder and colon.

== Gallium PSMA scan ==
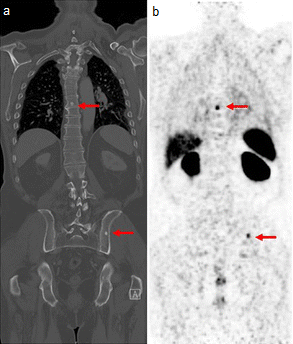
CT scan (left) and gallium PSMA PET scan (right) of patient with prostate cancer metastases in the bones

The positron emitting isotope, ^{68}Ga, can be used to target prostate-specific membrane antigen (PSMA), a protein which is present in prostate cancer cells. The technique has been shown to improve detection of metastatic disease compared to MRI or CT scans.

In December 2020, the U.S. Food and Drug Administration (FDA) approved ^{68}Ga PSMA-11 for medical use in the United States. It is indicated for positron emission tomography (PET) of prostate specific membrane antigen (PSMA) positive lesions in men with prostate cancer. It is manufactured by the UCLA Biomedical Cyclotron Facility. The FDA approved ^{68}Ga PSMA-11 based on evidence from two clinical trials (Trial 1/NCT0336847 identical to NCT02919111 and Trial 2/NCT02940262 identical to NCT02918357) of male participants with prostate cancer. Some participants were recently diagnosed with the prostate cancer. Other participants were treated before, but there was suspicion that the cancer was spreading because of rising prostate specific antigen or PSA. The trials were conducted at two sites in the United States.

The FDA considers ^{68}Ga PSMA-11 to be a first-in-class medication.

=== Common indications ===
Gallium PSMA scanning is recommended primarily in cases of biochemical recurrence of prostate cancer, particularly for patients with low PSA values, and in patients with high risk disease where metastases are considered likely.

=== Technique ===
An intravenous administration of 1.8–2.2 megabecquerels of ^{68}Ga PSMA-11 per kilogram of bodyweight is recommended. Imaging should commence approximately 60 minutes after administration with an acquisition from mid-thigh to the base of the skull.

== Gallium DOTA scans ==
^{68}Ga DOTA conjugated peptides (including ^{68}Ga DOTA-TATE, DOTA-TOC and DOTA-NOC) are used in positron emission tomography (PET) imaging of neuroendocrine tumours (NETs). The scan is similar to the SPECT octreotide scan in that an octreotide-based somatostatin analogue (such as edotreotide) is used as the radioligand, and there are similar indications and uses as octreotide scans, however image quality is significantly improved. Somatostatin receptors are overexpressed in many NETs, so that the ^{68}Ga DOTA conjugated peptide is preferentially taken up in these locations, and visualised on the scan. As well as diagnosis and staging of NETs, ^{68}Ga DOTA conjugated peptide imaging may be used for planning and dosimetry in preparation for lutetium-177 or yttrium-90 DOTA therapy. In June 2016, Netspot (kit for the preparation of gallium Ga-68 dotatate injection) was approved for medical use in the United States.

In August 2019, ^{68}Ga edotreotide injection (^{68}Ga DOTATOC) was approved for medical use in the United States for use with PET imaging for the localization of somatostatin receptor positive neuroendocrine tumors (NETs) in adults and children.

The U.S. Food and Drug Administration (FDA) approved ^{68}Ga edotreotide (DOTATOC) based on evidence from three clinical trials (Trial 1/NCT#1619865, Trial 2/NCT#1869725, Trial 3/NCT#2441062) of 334 known or suspected neuro-endocrine tumors. The trials were conducted in the United States.

Gallium (^{68}Ga) oxodotreotide was approved for medical use in Canada as Netspot in July 2019, and as Netvision in May 2022.

The combination germanium (^{68}Ge) chloride / gallium (^{68}Ga) chloride was approved for medical use in the European Union in August 2024.

Other gallium-68 based PET scanning agents may also be based on the principle of attaching peptides to chelators, such as the in-development drug Ga-68-Trivehexin.

== Radiochemistry of gallium-67 ==
Gallium-67 is produced by a cyclotron, using charged-particle (proton) bombardment of enriched Zn-68. The gallium-67 is then complexed with citric acid to form gallium citrate. The half-life of gallium-67 is 3.2617 days. It decays by electron capture, also emitting gamma rays that are detected by a gamma camera. The primary emissions are at 93 keV (39% of decays), followed by 185 keV (21%) and 300 keV (17%). For imaging, multiple gamma camera energy windows are used, typically centred around 93 and 184 keV or 93, 184, and 296 keV.

== Radiochemistry of gallium-68 ==
Gallium-68, which has a half-life much shorter than gallium-67 at 67.84 minutes, is produced in a gallium-68 generator by decay of germanium-68 with a 271.05 day half-life or, as with gallium-67, by the irradiation of zinc-68 in a cyclotron. Use of a generator means a supply of ^{68}Ga can be produced easily with minimal infrastructure, for example at sites without a cyclotron, commonly used to produce other PET isotopes. It decays by positron emission and electron capture into zinc-68; the maximum energy of the desired positron emission is 1.899 MeV.
