= Isotopes of bromine =

Isotopes of bromine (_{35}Br)
Main isotopes			Decay	
Isotope	abundance	half-life (t_{1/2})	mode	product
^{75}Br	synth	97 min	β^{+}	^{75}Se
^{76}Br	synth	16.2 h	β^{+}	^{76}Se
^{77}Br	synth	57.04 h	β^{+}	^{77}Se
^{79}Br	50.65%	stable		
^{80}Br	synth	17.68 min	β^{−}	^{80}Kr
^{80}Br	synth	17.68 min	β^{+}	^{80}Se
^{80m}Br	synth	4.4205 h	IT	^{80}Br
^{81}Br	49.35%	stable		
^{82}Br	synth	35.282 h	β^{−}	^{82}Kr

Standard atomic weight A_{r}°(Br)
- [79.901, 79.907]; 79.904±0.003 (abridged)

Bromine (_{35}Br) has two stable isotopes, ^{79}Br and ^{81}Br, with nearly equal natural abundance, and 32 known artificial radioisotopes from ^{68}Br to ^{101}Br, the most stable of which is ^{77}Br, with a half-life of 57.04 hours. This is followed by ^{82}Br at 35.282 hours and ^{76}Br at 16.2 hours; the most stable isomer is ^{80m}Br with the half-life of 4.4205 hours.

Like the radioactive isotopes of iodine, radioisotopes of bromine, collectively radiobromine, can be used to label biomolecules for nuclear medicine; for example, the positron emitters ^{75}Br and ^{76}Br can be used for positron emission tomography. Radiobromine has the advantage that organobromides are more stable than analogous organoiodides, and that it is not uptaken by the thyroid like iodine.

== List of isotopes ==
Nuclide (Note: ^{m}Br – Excited nuclear isomer.)	Z	N	Isotopic mass (Da) (Note: ( ) – Uncertainty (1σ) is given in concise form in parentheses after the corresponding last digits.) (Note: # – Atomic mass marked #: value and uncertainty derived not from purely experimental data, but at least partly from trends from the Mass Surface (TMS).)	Discovery year	Half-life	Decay mode (Note: Modes of decay: IT: / Isomeric transition; n: / Neutron emission; p: / Proton emission)	Daughter isotope (Note: Bold italics symbol as daughter – Daughter product is nearly stable.) (Note: Bold symbol as daughter – Daughter product is stable.)	Spin and parity (Note: ( ) spin value – Indicates spin with weak assignment arguments.) (Note: # – Values marked # are not purely derived from experimental data, but at least partly from trends of neighboring nuclides (TNN).)	Natural abundance (mole fraction)	
Nuclide	Excitation energy			Discovery year	Half-life	Decay mode	Daughter isotope	Spin and parity	Normal proportion	Range of variation
^{68}Br	35	33	67.95836(28)#	2019	~35 ns	p?	^{67}Se	3+#		
^{69}Br	35	34	68.950338(45)	2011	<19 ns	p	^{68}Se	(5/2−)		
^{70}Br	35	35	69.944792(16)	1978	78.8(3) ms	β^{+}	^{70}Se	0+		
^{70}Br	35	35	69.944792(16)	1978	78.8(3) ms	β^{+}, p?	^{69}As	0+		
^{70m}Br	2292.3(8) keV			1981	2.16(5) s	β^{+}	^{70}Se	9+		
^{70m}Br	2292.3(8) keV			1981	2.16(5) s	β^{+}, p?	^{69}As	9+		
^{71}Br	35	36	70.9393422(58)	1982	21.4(6) s	β^{+}	^{71}Se	(5/2)−		
^{72}Br	35	37	71.9365946(11)	1970	78.6(24) s	β^{+}	^{72}Se	1+		
^{72m}Br	100.76(15) keV			1982	10.6(3) s	IT	^{72}Br	(3−)		
^{72m}Br	100.76(15) keV			1982	10.6(3) s	β^{+}?	^{72}Se	(3−)		
^{73}Br	35	38	72.9316734(72)	1970	3.4(2) min	β^{+}	^{73}Se	1/2−		
^{74}Br	35	39	73.9299103(63)	1953	25.4(3) min	β^{+}	^{74}Se	(0−)		
^{74m}Br	13.58(21) keV			1974	46(2) min	β^{+}	^{74}Se	4+		
^{75}Br	35	40	74.9258106(46)	1948	96.7(13) min	β^{+} (76%)	^{75}Se	3/2−		
^{75}Br	35	40	74.9258106(46)	1948	96.7(13) min	EC (24%)	^{75}Se	3/2−		
^{76}Br	35	41	75.924542(10)	1952	16.2(2) h	β^{+} (57%)	^{76}Se	1−		
^{76}Br	35	41	75.924542(10)	1952	16.2(2) h	EC (43%)	^{76}Se	1−		
^{76m}Br	102.58(3) keV			1978	1.31(2) s	IT (>99.4%)	^{76}Br	(4)+		
^{76m}Br	102.58(3) keV			1978	1.31(2) s	β^{+} (<0.6%)	^{76}Se	(4)+		
^{77}Br	35	42	76.9213792(30)	1948	57.04(12) h	EC (99.3%)	^{77}Se	3/2−		
^{77}Br	35	42	76.9213792(30)	1948	57.04(12) h	β^{+} (0.7%)	^{77}Se	3/2−		
^{77m}Br	105.86(8) keV			1972	4.28(10) min	IT	^{77}Br	9/2+		
^{78}Br	35	43	77.9211459(38)	1937	6.45(4) min	β^{+} (>99.99%)	^{78}Se	1+		
^{78}Br	35	43	77.9211459(38)	1937	6.45(4) min	β^{−} (<0.01%)	^{78}Kr	1+		
^{78m}Br	180.89(13) keV			1961	119.4(10) μs	IT	^{78}Br	(4+)		
^{79}Br	35	44	78.9183376(11)	1920	Stable			3/2−	0.5065(9)	
^{79m}Br	207.61(9) keV			1962	4.85(4) s	IT	^{79}Br	9/2+		
^{80}Br	35	45	79.9185298(11)	1937	17.68(2) min	β^{−} (91.7%)	^{80}Kr	1+		
^{80}Br	35	45	79.9185298(11)	1937	17.68(2) min	β^{+} (8.3%)	^{80}Se	1+		
^{80m}Br	85.843(4) keV			1937	4.4205(8) h	IT	^{80}Br	5−		
^{81}Br (Note: Fission product)	35	46	80.9162882(10)	1920	Stable			3/2−	0.4935(9)	
^{81m}Br	536.20(9) keV			1965	34.6(28) μs	IT	^{81}Br	9/2+		
^{82}Br	35	47	81.9168018(10)	1937	35.282(7) h	β^{−}	^{82}Kr	5−		
^{82m}Br	45.9492(10) keV			1965	6.13(5) min	IT (97.6%)	^{82}Br	2−		
^{82m}Br	45.9492(10) keV			1965	6.13(5) min	β^{−} (2.4%)	^{82}Kr	2−		
^{83}Br	35	48	82.9151753(41)	1937	2.374(4) h	β^{−}	^{83}Kr	3/2−		
^{83m}Br	3069.2(4) keV			1989	729(77) ns	IT	^{83}Br	(19/2−)		
^{84}Br	35	49	83.9165136(17)	1943	31.76(8) min	β^{−}	^{84}Kr	2−		
^{84m1}Br	193.6(15) keV			1960	6.0(2) min	β^{−}	^{84}Kr	(6)−		
^{84m2}Br	408.2(4) keV			(1970) (Note: Half-life not measured, only upper limit.)	<140 ns	IT	^{84}Br	1+		
^{85}Br	35	50	84.9156458(33)	1943	2.90(6) min	β^{−}	^{85m1}Kr	3/2−		
^{86}Br	35	51	85.9188054(33)	1962	55.1(4) s	β^{−}	^{86}Kr	(1−)		
^{87}Br	35	52	86.9206740(34)	1943	55.68(12) s	β^{−} (97.40%)	^{87}Kr	5/2−		
^{87}Br	35	52	86.9206740(34)	1943	55.68(12) s	β^{−}, n (2.60%)	^{86}Kr	5/2−		
^{88}Br	35	53	87.9240833(34)	1949	16.34(8) s	β^{−} (93.42%)	^{88}Kr	(1−)		
^{88}Br	35	53	87.9240833(34)	1949	16.34(8) s	β^{−}, n (6.58%)	^{87}Kr	(1−)		
^{88m}Br	270.17(11) keV			1970	5.51(4) μs	IT	^{88}Br	(4−)		
^{89}Br	35	54	88.9267046(35)	1959	4.357(22) s	β^{−} (86.2%)	^{89}Kr	(3/2−, 5/2−)		
^{89}Br	35	54	88.9267046(35)	1959	4.357(22) s	β^{−}, n (13.8%)	^{88}Kr	(3/2−, 5/2−)		
^{90}Br	35	55	89.9312928(36)	1959	1.910(10) s	β^{−} (74.7%)	^{90}Kr			
^{90}Br	35	55	89.9312928(36)	1959	1.910(10) s	β^{−}, n (25.3%)	^{89}Kr			
^{91}Br	35	56	90.9343986(38)	1974	543(4) ms	β^{−} (70.5%)	^{91}Kr	5/2−#		
^{91}Br	35	56	90.9343986(38)	1974	543(4) ms	β^{−}, n (29.5%)	^{90}Kr	5/2−#		
^{92}Br	35	57	91.9396316(72)	1974	314(16) ms	β^{−} (66.9%)	^{92}Kr	(2−)		
^{92}Br	35	57	91.9396316(72)	1974	314(16) ms	β^{−}, n (33.1%)	^{91}Kr	(2−)		
^{92}Br	35	57	91.9396316(72)	1974	314(16) ms	β^{−}, 2n?	^{90}Kr	(2−)		
^{92m1}Br	662(1) keV			(2012) (Note: Half-life shorter than 100ns, not included in discovery database)	88(8) ns	IT	^{92}Br			
^{92m2}Br	1138(1) keV			(2012)	85(10) ns	IT	^{92}Br			
^{93}Br	35	58	92.94322(46)	1988	152(8) ms	β^{−}, n (64%)	^{92}Kr	5/2−#		
^{93}Br	35	58	92.94322(46)	1988	152(8) ms	β^{−} (36%)	^{93}Kr	5/2−#		
^{93}Br	35	58	92.94322(46)	1988	152(8) ms	β^{−}, 2n?	^{91}Kr	5/2−#		
^{94}Br	35	59	93.94885(22)#	1988	70(20) ms	β^{−}, n (68%)	^{93}Kr	2−#		
^{94}Br	35	59	93.94885(22)#	1988	70(20) ms	β^{−} (32%)	^{94}Kr	2−#		
^{94}Br	35	59	93.94885(22)#	1988	70(20) ms	β^{−}, 2n?	^{92}Kr	2−#		
^{94m}Br	294.6(5) keV			2012	530(15) ns	IT	^{94}Br			
^{95}Br	35	60	94.95293(32)#	1997	80# ms [>300 ns]	β^{−}?	^{95}Kr	5/2−#		
^{95}Br	35	60	94.95293(32)#	1997	80# ms [>300 ns]	β^{−}, n?	^{94}Kr	5/2−#		
^{95}Br	35	60	94.95293(32)#	1997	80# ms [>300 ns]	β^{−}, 2n?	^{93}Kr	5/2−#		
^{95m}Br	537.9(5) keV			2012	6.8(10) μs	IT	^{95}Br			
^{96}Br	35	61	95.95898(32)#	1997	20# ms [>300 ns]	β^{−}?	^{96}Kr			
^{96}Br	35	61	95.95898(32)#	1997	20# ms [>300 ns]	β^{−}, n?	^{95}Kr			
^{96}Br	35	61	95.95898(32)#	1997	20# ms [>300 ns]	β^{−}, 2n?	^{94}Kr			
^{96m}Br	311.5(5) keV			2012	3.0(9) μs	IT	^{96}Br			
^{97}Br	35	62	96.96350(43)#	1997	40# ms [>300 ns]	β^{−}?	^{97}Kr	5/2−#		
^{97}Br	35	62	96.96350(43)#	1997	40# ms [>300 ns]	β^{−}, n?	^{96}Kr	5/2−#		
^{97}Br	35	62	96.96350(43)#	1997	40# ms [>300 ns]	β^{−}, 2n?	^{95}Kr	5/2−#		
^{98}Br	35	63	97.96989(43)#	2010	15# ms [>400 ns]	β^{−}?	^{98}Kr			
^{98}Br	35	63	97.96989(43)#	2010	15# ms [>400 ns]	β^{−}, n?	^{97}Kr			
^{98}Br	35	63	97.96989(43)#	2010	15# ms [>400 ns]	β^{−}, 2n?	^{96}Kr			
^{99}Br	35	64		2024						
^{100}Br	35	65		2024						
^{101}Br	35	66		2021						
This table header & footer:

== Bromine-75 ==
Bromine-75 has a half-life of 97 minutes. This isotope undergoes positron emission rather than electron capture about 76% of the time, so it was used for diagnosis and positron emission tomography (PET) in the 1980s. However, its decay product, selenium-75, produces secondary radioactivity with a longer half-life of around 120 days.

== Bromine-76 ==
Bromine-76 has a half-life of 16.2 hours. While its decay is more energetic than ^{75}Br and has a lower yield of positrons, about 57% of decays, bromine-76 has been preferred in PET applications since the 1980s because of its longer half-life and easier synthesis, and because its decay product, ^{76}Se, is not radioactive.

== Bromine-77 ==
Bromine-77 is the most stable radioisotope of bromine, with a half-life of 57.04 hours. Although β^{+} decay is possible for this isotope, about 99.3% of decays are by electron capture. Despite its complex emission spectrum, featuring strong gamma-ray emissions at 239, 297, 521, and 579 keV, ^{77}Br was used in SPECT imaging in the 1970s. However, except for longer-term tracing, this is no longer considered practical due to the difficult collimator requirements and the proximity of the 521 keV line to the 511 keV annihilation radiation related to the β^{+} decay. The Auger electrons emitted during decay are nevertheless well-suited for radiotherapy, and ^{77}Br can possibly be paired with the imaging-suited ^{76}Br (produced as an impurity in common synthesis routes) for this application.

== See also ==
Daughter products other than bromine

- Isotopes of krypton
- Isotopes of selenium
- Isotopes of arsenic
