= Isotopes of arsenic =

Isotopes of arsenic (_{33}As)
Main isotopes			Decay	
Isotope	abundance	half-life (t_{1/2})	mode	product
^{73}As	synth	80.30 d	ε	^{73}Ge
^{74}As	synth	17.77 d	β^{+}66%	^{74}Ge
^{74}As	synth	17.77 d	β^{−}34%	^{74}Se
^{75}As	100%	stable		

Standard atomic weight A_{r}°(As)
- 74.921595±0.000006; 74.922±0.001 (abridged)

Arsenic occurs naturally as one stable isotope, ^{75}As, so is monoisotopic and mononuclidic. Synthetic radioisotopes are known from ^{64}As to ^{95}As, as well as at least 11 isomers.

The most stable of these are ^{73}As with a half-life of 80.30 days and ^{74}As with a half-life of 17.77 days, followed by ^{71}As (65.30 hours), ^{77}As (38.79 hours), ^{76}As (26.24 hours), and ^{72}As (26.0 hours). All others outside this range of mass number 71-77 have half-lives under 100 minutes and most under one minute. The longest-lived of the isomers is ^{82m}As at 13.6 seconds.

Isotopes lighter than the stable one generally decay by positron emission or electron capture to germanium isotopes, while those heavier beta decay to selenium isotopes. A notable exception is that ^{74}As decays both ways.

== List of isotopes ==
Nuclide (Note: ^{m}As – Excited nuclear isomer.)	Z	N	Isotopic mass (Da) (Note: ( ) – Uncertainty (1σ) is given in concise form in parentheses after the corresponding last digits.) (Note: # – Atomic mass marked #: value and uncertainty derived not from purely experimental data, but at least partly from trends from the Mass Surface (TMS).)	Discovery year	Half-life	Decay mode (Note: Modes of decay: EC: / Electron capture; n: / Neutron emission; p: / Proton emission)	Daughter isotope (Note: Bold italics symbol as daughter – Daughter product is nearly stable.) (Note: Bold symbol as daughter – Daughter product is stable.)	Spin and parity (Note: ( ) spin value – Indicates spin with weak assignment arguments.) (Note: # – Values marked # are not purely derived from experimental data, but at least partly from trends of neighboring nuclides (TNN).)	Isotopic abundance
Nuclide	Excitation energy			Discovery year	Half-life	Decay mode	Daughter isotope	Spin and parity	Isotopic abundance
^{64}As	33	31	63.95756(22)#	1995	69.0(14) ms	β^{+}	^{64}Ge	0+#	
^{64}As	33	31	63.95756(22)#	1995	69.0(14) ms	β^{+}, p?	^{63}Ga	0+#	
^{65}As	33	32	64.949611(91)	1991	130.3(6) ms	β^{+}	^{65}Ge	3/2−#	
^{65}As	33	32	64.949611(91)	1991	130.3(6) ms	β^{+}, p?	^{64}Ga	3/2−#	
^{66}As	33	33	65.9441488(61)	1978	95.77(23) ms	β^{+}	^{66}Ge	0+	
^{66m1}As	1356.63(17) keV			1998	1.14(4) μs	IT	^{66}As	5+	
^{66m2}As	3023.(3) keV			1998	7.98(26) μs	IT	^{66}As	9+	
^{67}As	33	34	66.93925111(48)	1980	42.5(12) s	β^{+}	^{67}Ge	(5/2−)	
^{68}As	33	35	67.9367741(20)	1971	151.6(8) s	β^{+}	^{68}Ge	3+	
^{68m}As	425.1(2) keV			1994	111(20) ns	IT	^{68}As	1+	
^{69}As	33	36	68.932246(34)	1955	15.2(2) min	β^{+}	^{69}Ge	5/2−	
^{70}As	33	37	69.9309346(15)	1950	52.6(3) min	β^{+}	^{70}Ge	4+	
^{70m}As	32.046(23) keV			1979	96(3) μs	IT	^{70}As	2+	
^{71}As	33	38	70.9271136(45)	1939	65.30(7) h	β^{+}	^{71}Ge	5/2−	
^{72}As	33	39	71.9267523(44)	1947	26.0(1) h	β^{+}	^{72}Ge	2−	
^{73}As	33	40	72.9238291(41)	1948	80.30(6) d	EC	^{73}Ge	3/2−	
^{73m}As	427.902(21) keV			1956	5.7(2) μs	IT	^{73}As	9/2+	
^{74}As	33	41	73.9239286(18)	1938	17.77(2) d	β^{+} (66%)	^{74}Ge	2−	
^{74}As	33	41	73.9239286(18)	1938	17.77(2) d	β^{−} (34%)	^{74}Se	2−	
^{75}As	33	42	74.92159456(95)	1920	Stable			3/2−	1.0000
^{75m}As	303.9243(8) keV			1957	17.62(23) ms	IT	^{75}As	9/2+	
^{76}As	33	43	75.92239201(95)	1934	1.0933(38) d	β^{−}	^{76}Se	2−	
^{76m}As	44.425(1) keV			1968	1.84(6) μs	IT	^{76}As	(1)+	
^{77}As (Note: Fission product)	33	44	76.9206476(18)	1951	38.79(5) h	β^{−}	^{77}Se	3/2−	
^{77m}As	475.48(4) keV			1957	114.0(25) μs	IT	^{77}As	9/2+	
^{78}As	33	45	77.921828(10)	1937	90.7(2) min	β^{−}	^{78}Se	2−	
^{79}As	33	46	78.9209484(57)	1950	9.01(15) min	β^{−}	^{79}Se	3/2−	
^{79m}As	772.81(6) keV			1998	1.21(1) μs	IT	^{79}As	(9/2)+	
^{80}As	33	47	79.9224744(36)	1959	15.2(2) s	β^{−}	^{80}Se	1+	
^{81}As	33	48	80.9221323(28)	1960	33.3(8) s	β^{−}	^{81}Se	3/2−	
^{82}As	33	49	81.9247387(40)	1968	19.1(5) s	β^{−}	^{82}Se	(2−)	
^{82m}As	131.6(5) keV			1970	13.6(4) s	β^{−}	^{82}Se	(5-)	
^{83}As	33	50	82.9252069(30)	1968	13.4(4) s	β^{−}	^{83}Se	5/2−#	
^{84}As	33	51	83.9293033(34)	1968	3.16(58) s	β^{−} (99.72%)	^{84}Se	(2−)	
^{84}As	33	51	83.9293033(34)	1968	3.16(58) s	β^{−}, n (.28%)	^{83}Se	(2−)	
^{85}As	33	52	84.9321637(33)	1967	2.022(7) s	β^{−}, n (62.6%)	^{84}Se	(5/2−)	
^{85}As	33	52	84.9321637(33)	1967	2.022(7) s	β^{−} (37.4%)	^{85}Se	(5/2−)	
^{86}As	33	53	85.9367015(37)	1973	945(8) ms	β^{−} (64.5%)	^{86}Se	(1−,2−)	
^{86}As	33	53	85.9367015(37)	1973	945(8) ms	β^{−}, n (35.5%)	^{85}Se	(1−,2−)	
^{86}As	33	53	85.9367015(37)	1973	945(8) ms	β^{−}, 2n?	^{84}Se	(1−,2−)	
^{87}As	33	54	86.9402917(32)	1970	492(25) ms	β^{−} (84.6%)	^{87}Se	(5/2−,3/2−)	
^{87}As	33	54	86.9402917(32)	1970	492(25) ms	β^{−}, n (15.4%)	^{86}Se	(5/2−,3/2−)	
^{87}As	33	54	86.9402917(32)	1970	492(25) ms	β^{−}, 2n?	^{85}Se	(5/2−,3/2−)	
^{88}As	33	55	87.94584(22)#	1994	270(150) ms	β^{−}	^{88}Se		
^{88}As	33	55	87.94584(22)#	1994	270(150) ms	β^{−}, n?	^{87}Se		
^{89}As	33	56	88.95005(32)#	1994	220# ms [>150 ns]	β^{−}?	^{89}Se	5/2−#	
^{89}As	33	56	88.95005(32)#	1994	220# ms [>150 ns]	β^{−}, n?	^{88}Se	5/2−#	
^{89}As	33	56	88.95005(32)#	1994	220# ms [>150 ns]	β^{−}, 2n?	^{87}Se	5/2−#	
^{90}As	33	57	89.95600(43)#	1997	70# ms [>300 ns]	β^{−}?	^{90}Se		
^{90}As	33	57	89.95600(43)#	1997	70# ms [>300 ns]	β^{−}, n?	^{89}Se		
^{90}As	33	57	89.95600(43)#	1997	70# ms [>300 ns]	β^{−}, 2n?	^{88}Se		
^{90m}As	124.5(5) keV			2012	220(100) ns	IT	^{90}As		
^{91}As	33	58	90.96082(43)#	1997	100# ms [>300 ns]	β^{−}?	^{91}Se	5/2−#	
^{91}As	33	58	90.96082(43)#	1997	100# ms [>300 ns]	β^{−}, n?	^{90}Se	5/2−#	
^{91}As	33	58	90.96082(43)#	1997	100# ms [>300 ns]	β^{−}, 2n?	^{89}Se	5/2−#	
^{92}As	33	59	91.96739(54)#	1997	45# ms [>300 ns]	β^{−}?	^{92}Se		
^{92}As	33	59	91.96739(54)#	1997	45# ms [>300 ns]	β^{−}, n?	^{91}Se		
^{92}As	33	59	91.96739(54)#	1997	45# ms [>300 ns]	β^{−}, 2n?	^{90}Se		
^{93}As	33	60		2024					
^{94}As	33	61		2024					
^{95}As	33	62		2024					
This table header & footer:

== See also ==
Daughter products other than arsenic

- Isotopes of selenium
- Isotopes of germanium
- Isotopes of gallium
