= Isotopes of germanium =

Isotopes of germanium (_{32}Ge)
Main isotopes			Decay	
Isotope	abundance	half-life (t_{1/2})	mode	product
^{68}Ge	synth	271.05 d	ε	^{68}Ga
^{70}Ge	20.5%	stable		
^{71}Ge	synth	11.468 d	ε	^{71}Ga
^{72}Ge	27.4%	stable		
^{73}Ge	7.76%	stable		
^{74}Ge	36.5%	stable		
^{76}Ge	7.75%	2.02×10^{21} y	β^{−}β^{−}	^{76}Se

Standard atomic weight A_{r}°(Ge)
- 72.630±0.008; 72.630±0.008 (abridged)

Germanium (_{32}Ge) has five naturally occurring isotopes, ^{70}Ge, ^{72}Ge, ^{73}Ge, ^{74}Ge, and ^{76}Ge. Of these, ^{76}Ge is very slightly radioactive, undergoing double beta decay with a half-life of 2.02 × 10^{21} years (over 100 billion times the age of the universe).

Stable ^{74}Ge is the most common isotope, having a natural abundance of 36.52%; ^{76}Ge is the least common with a natural abundance of 7.75%.

At least 27 additional radioisotopes have also been synthesized ranging in atomic mass from 58 to 89. The most stable of these is ^{68}Ge, decaying by electron capture with a half-life of 271.05 days, whose daughter is the medically useful positron-emitting isotope ^{68}Ga. (See gallium-68 generator for notes on the source of this isotope, and its medical use.) The next after that is ^{71}Ge, also decaying by electron capture with half-life 11.468 days, and the rest are all less than two days, most under two hours.

While most of germanium's radioisotopes decay by beta decay - β^{+} for isotopes lighter than 74-76, and β^{-} for those heavier - isotopes as heavy as ^{65}Ge can also decay by β^{+}-delayed proton emission, and those as light as ^{84}Ge by β^{−}-delayed neutron emission.

^{76}Ge is used in experiments on the nature of neutrinos, by searching for neutrinoless double beta decay.

== List of isotopes ==
Nuclide (Note: ^{m}Ge – Excited nuclear isomer.)	Z	N	Isotopic mass (Da) (Note: ( ) – Uncertainty (1σ) is given in concise form in parentheses after the corresponding last digits.) (Note: # – Atomic mass marked #: value and uncertainty derived not from purely experimental data, but at least partly from trends from the Mass Surface (TMS).)	Discovery year	Half-life (Note: Bold half-life – nearly stable, half-life longer than age of universe.) (Note: # – Values marked # are not purely derived from experimental data, but at least partly from trends of neighboring nuclides (TNN).)	Decay mode (Note: Modes of decay: EC: / Electron capture; IT: / Isomeric transition; n: / Neutron emission; p: / Proton emission)	Daughter isotope (Note: Bold symbol as daughter – Daughter product is stable.)	Spin and parity (Note: ( ) spin value – Indicates spin with weak assignment arguments.)	Natural abundance (mole fraction)	
Nuclide	Excitation energy			Discovery year	Half-life	Decay mode	Daughter isotope	Spin and parity	Normal proportion	Range of variation
^{59}Ge	32	27	58.98243(43)#	2015	13.3(17) ms	β^{+}, p	^{58}Zn	7/2−#		
^{59}Ge	32	27	58.98243(43)#	2015	13.3(17) ms	2p (<0.2%)	^{57}Zn	7/2−#		
^{60}Ge	32	28	59.970286(24)	2005	25.0(3) ms	β^{+}, p (67%)	^{59}Zn	0+		
^{60}Ge	32	28	59.970286(24)	2005	25.0(3) ms	β^{+} (33%)	^{60}Ga	0+		
^{61}Ge	32	29	60.96373(32)#	1987	40.7(4) ms	β^{+}, p (87%)	^{60}Zn	3/2−#		
^{61}Ge	32	29	60.96373(32)#	1987	40.7(4) ms	β^{+} (13%)	^{61}Ga	3/2−#		
^{62}Ge	32	30	61.95463(15)	1991	73.5(1) ms	β^{+}	^{62}Ga	0+		
^{63}Ge	32	31	62.949628(40)	1991	153.6(11) ms	β^{+}	^{63}Ga	3/2−#		
^{64}Ge	32	32	63.9416899(40)	1972	63.7(25) s	β^{+}	^{64}Ga	0+		
^{65}Ge	32	33	64.9393681(23)	1972	30.9(5) s	β^{+} (99.99%)	^{65}Ga	3/2−		
^{65}Ge	32	33	64.9393681(23)	1972	30.9(5) s	β^{+}, p (0.011%)	^{64}Zn	3/2−		
^{66}Ge	32	34	65.9338621(26)	1950	2.26(5) h	β^{+}	^{66}Ga	0+		
^{67}Ge	32	35	66.9327170(46)	1950	18.9(3) min	β^{+}	^{67}Ga	1/2−		
^{67m1}Ge	18.20(5) keV			1978	13.7(9) μs	IT	^{67}Ge	5/2−		
^{67m2}Ge	751.70(6) keV			1978	109.1(38) ns	IT	^{67}Ge	9/2+		
^{68}Ge (Note: Used to generate ^{68}Ga)	32	36	67.9280953(20)	1948	271.05(8) d	EC	^{68}Ga	0+		
^{69}Ge	32	37	68.9279645(14)	1938	39.05(10) h	β^{+}	^{69}Ga	5/2−		
^{69m1}Ge	86.76(2) keV			1964	5.1(2) μs	IT	^{69}Ge	1/2−		
^{69m2}Ge	397.94(2) keV			1970	2.81(5) μs	IT	^{69}Ge	9/2+		
^{70}Ge	32	38	69.92424854(88)	1923	Stable			0+	0.2052(19)	
^{71}Ge	32	39	70.92495212(87)	1941	11.468(8) d	EC	^{71}Ga	1/2−		
^{71m}Ge	198.354(14) keV			1961	20.41(18) ms	IT	^{71}Ge	9/2+		
^{72}Ge	32	40	71.922075824(81)	1923	Stable			0+	0.2745(15)	
^{72m}Ge	691.43(4) keV			1949	444.2(8) ns	IT	^{72}Ge	0+		
^{73}Ge	32	41	72.923458954(61)	1931	Stable			9/2+	0.0776(8)	
^{73m1}Ge	13.2845(15) keV			1953	2.91(3) μs	IT	^{73}Ge	5/2+		
^{73m2}Ge	66.725(9) keV			1957	499(11) ms	IT	^{73}Ge	1/2−		
^{74}Ge	32	42	73.921177760(13)	1923	Stable			0+	0.3652(12)	
^{75}Ge	32	43	74.922858370(55)	1939	82.78(4) min	β^{−}	^{75}As	1/2−		
^{75m1}Ge	139.69(3) keV			1952	47.7(5) s	IT (99.97%)	^{75}Ge	7/2+		
^{75m1}Ge	139.69(3) keV			1952	47.7(5) s	β^{−} (0.030%)	^{75}As	7/2+		
^{75m2}Ge	192.19(6) keV			1982	216(5) ns	IT	^{75}Ge	5/2+		
^{76}Ge (Note: Fission product) (Note: Primordial radionuclide)	32	44	75.921402725(19)	1931	2.022(0.018 (stat), 0.038 (sys))×10^{21} y	β^{−}β^{−}	^{76}Se	0+	0.0775(12)	
^{77}Ge	32	45	76.923549843(56)	1939	11.211(3) h	β^{−}	^{77}As	7/2+		
^{77m}Ge	159.71(6) keV			1947	53.7(6) s	β^{−} (81%)	^{77}As	1/2−		
^{77m}Ge	159.71(6) keV			1947	53.7(6) s	IT (19%)	^{77}Ge	1/2−		
^{78}Ge	32	46	77.9228529(38)	1951	88.0(10) min	β^{−}	^{78}As	0+		
^{79}Ge	32	47	78.925360(40)	1970	18.98(3) s	β^{−}	^{79}As	(1/2)−		
^{79m}Ge	185.95(4) keV			1974	39.0(10) s	β^{−} (96%)	^{79}As	7/2+#		
^{79m}Ge	185.95(4) keV			1974	39.0(10) s	IT (4%)	^{79}Ge	7/2+#		
^{80}Ge	32	48	79.9253508(22)	1972	29.5(4) s	β^{−}	^{80}As	0+		
^{81}Ge	32	49	80.9288329(22)	1972	9(2) s	β^{−}	^{81}As	9/2+#		
^{81m}Ge	679.14(4) keV			1981	6(2) s	β^{−}	^{81}As	(1/2+)		
^{81m}Ge	679.14(4) keV			1981	6(2) s	IT (<1%)	^{81}Ge	(1/2+)		
^{82}Ge	32	50	81.9297740(24)	1972	4.31(19) s	β^{−}	^{82}As	0+		
^{83}Ge	32	51	82.9345391(26)	1972	1.85(6) s	β^{−}	^{83}As	(5/2+)		
^{84}Ge	32	52	83.9375751(34)	1972	951(9) ms	β^{−} (89.4%)	^{84}As	0+		
^{84}Ge	32	52	83.9375751(34)	1972	951(9) ms	β^{−}, n (10.6%)	^{83}As	0+		
^{85}Ge	32	53	84.9429697(40)	1991	495(5) ms	β^{−} (82.8%)	^{85}As	(3/2+,5/2+)#		
^{85}Ge	32	53	84.9429697(40)	1991	495(5) ms	β^{−}, n (17.2%)	^{84}As	(3/2+,5/2+)#		
^{86}Ge	32	54	85.94697(47)	1994	221.6(11) ms	β^{−} (55%)	^{86}As	0+		
^{86}Ge	32	54	85.94697(47)	1994	221.6(11) ms	β^{−}, n (45%)	^{85}As	0+		
^{87}Ge	32	55	86.95320(32)#	1997	103(4) ms	β^{−}	^{87}As	5/2+#		
^{88}Ge	32	56	87.95757(43)#	1997	61(6) ms	β^{−}	^{88}As	0+		
^{89}Ge	32	57	88.96453(43)#	1997	60# ms [>300 ns]			3/2+#		
^{90}Ge	32	58	89.96944(54)#	2010	30# ms [>400 ns]			0+		
^{91}Ge	32	59		2024						
^{92}Ge	32	60		2024						
This table header & footer:

== See also ==
Daughter products other than germanium

- Isotopes of selenium
- Isotopes of arsenic
- Isotopes of gallium
- Isotopes of zinc
- Isotopes of copper
