= Isotopes of krypton =

Isotopes of krypton (_{36}Kr)
Main isotopes			Decay	
Isotope	abundance	half-life (t_{1/2})	mode	product
^{78}Kr	0.360%	9.2×10^{21} y	εε	^{78}Se
^{79}Kr	synth	1.46 d	β^{+}	^{79}Br
^{80}Kr	2.29%	stable		
^{81}Kr	trace	2.3×10^{5} y	ε	^{81}Br
^{81m}Kr	synth	13.10 s	IT	^{81}Kr
^{81m}Kr	synth	13.10 s	ε	^{81}Br
^{82}Kr	11.6%	stable		
^{83}Kr	11.5%	stable		
^{84}Kr	57.0%	stable		
^{85}Kr	trace	10.728 y	β^{−}	^{85}Rb
^{86}Kr	17.3%	stable		

Standard atomic weight A_{r}°(Kr)
- 83.798±0.002; 83.798±0.002 (abridged)

There are 34 known isotopes of krypton (_{36}Kr) with atomic mass numbers from 67 to 103. Naturally occurring krypton is made of five stable isotopes and one (^{78}Kr) which is slightly radioactive with an extremely long half-life, plus traces of radioisotopes that are produced by cosmic rays in the atmosphere. Atmospheric krypton today is, however, considerably radioactive due almost entirely to artificial ^{85}Kr.

== List of isotopes ==
Nuclide (Note: ^{m}Kr – Excited nuclear isomer.)	Z	N	Isotopic mass (Da) (Note: ( ) – Uncertainty (1σ) is given in concise form in parentheses after the corresponding last digits.) (Note: # – Atomic mass marked #: value and uncertainty derived not from purely experimental data, but at least partly from trends from the Mass Surface (TMS).)	Discovery year	Half-life (Note: Bold half-life – nearly stable, half-life longer than age of universe.) (Note: # – Values marked # are not purely derived from experimental data, but at least partly from trends of neighboring nuclides (TNN).)	Decay mode (Note: Modes of decay: n: / Neutron emission)	Daughter isotope (Note: Bold italics symbol as daughter – Daughter product is nearly stable.) (Note: Bold symbol as daughter – Daughter product is stable.)	Spin and parity (Note: ( ) spin value – Indicates spin with weak assignment arguments.)	Natural abundance (mole fraction)	
Nuclide	Excitation energy			Discovery year	Half-life	Decay mode	Daughter isotope	Spin and parity	Normal proportion	Range of variation
^{67}Kr	36	31	66.98331(46)#	2016	7.4(29) ms	β^{+}, p (?%)	^{66}Se	3/2-#		
^{67}Kr	36	31	66.98331(46)#	2016	7.4(29) ms	2p (37%)	^{65}Se	3/2-#		
^{68}Kr	36	32	67.97249(54)#	2016	21.6(33) ms	β^{+}, p	^{67}Se	0+		
^{69}Kr	36	33	68.96550(32)#	1995	27.9(8) ms	β^{+}, p (94%)	^{68}Se	(5/2−)		
^{69}Kr	36	33	68.96550(32)#	1995	27.9(8) ms	β^{+} (6%)	^{69}Br	(5/2−)		
^{70}Kr	36	34	69.95588(22)#	1995	45.00(14) ms	β^{+} (>98.7%)	^{70}Br	0+		
^{70}Kr	36	34	69.95588(22)#	1995	45.00(14) ms	β^{+}, p (<1.3%)	^{69}Se	0+		
^{71}Kr	36	35	70.95027(14)	1981	98.8(3) ms	β^{+} (97.9%)	^{71}Br	(5/2)−		
^{71}Kr	36	35	70.95027(14)	1981	98.8(3) ms	β^{+}, p (2.1%)	^{70}Se	(5/2)−		
^{72}Kr	36	36	71.9420924(86)	1973	17.16(18) s	β^{+}	^{72}Br	0+		
^{73}Kr	36	37	72.9392892(71)	1972	27.3(10) s	β^{+} (99.75%)	^{73}Br	(3/2)−		
^{73}Kr	36	37	72.9392892(71)	1972	27.3(10) s	β^{+}, p (0.25%)	^{72}Se	(3/2)−		
^{73m}Kr	433.55(13) keV			1993	107(10) ns	IT	^{73}Kr	(9/2+)		
^{74}Kr	36	38	73.9330840(22)	1960	11.50(11) min	β^{+}	^{74}Br	0+		
^{75}Kr	36	39	74.9309457(87)	1960	4.60(7) min	β^{+}	^{75}Br	5/2+		
^{76}Kr	36	40	75.9259107(43)	1954	14.8(1) h	β^{+}	^{76}Br	0+		
^{77}Kr	36	41	76.9246700(21)	1948	72.6(9) min	β^{+}	^{77}Br	5/2+		
^{77m}Kr	66.50(5) keV			1975	118(12) ns	IT	^{77}Kr	3/2−		
^{78}Kr (Note: Primordial radionuclide)	36	42	77.92036634(33)	1920	9.2(^{+5.5}_{−2.6}(stat),±1.3(sys))×10^{21} y	Double EC	^{78}Se	0+	0.00355(3)	
^{79}Kr	36	43	78.9200829(37)	1948	35.04(10) h	β^{+}	^{79}Br	1/2−		
^{79m}Kr	129.77(5) keV			1969	50(3) s	IT	^{79}Kr	7/2+		
^{80}Kr	36	44	79.91637794(75)	1920	Stable			0+	0.02286(10)	
^{81}Kr (Note: Used to date groundwater)	36	45	80.9165897(12)	1950	2.29(11)×10^{5} y	EC	^{81}Br	7/2+	6×10^{−13}	
^{81m}Kr	190.64(4) keV			1969	13.10(3) s	IT	^{81}Kr	1/2−		
^{81m}Kr	190.64(4) keV			1969	13.10(3) s	EC (0.0025%)	^{81}Br	1/2−		
^{82}Kr	36	46	81.9134811537(59)	1920	Stable			0+	0.11593(31)	
^{83}Kr (Note: Fission product)	36	47	82.914126516(9)	1920	Stable			9/2+	0.11500(19)	
^{83m1}Kr	9.4053(8) keV			1963	156.8(5) ns	IT	^{83}Kr	7/2+		
^{83m2}Kr	41.5575(7) keV			1940	1.830(13) h	IT	^{83}Kr	1/2−		
^{84}Kr	36	48	83.9114977271(41)	1920	Stable			0+	0.56987(15)	
^{84m}Kr	3236.07(18) keV			1977	1.83(4) μs	IT	^{84}Kr	8+		
^{85}Kr	36	49	84.9125273(21)	1943	10.728(7) y	β^{−}	^{85}Rb	9/2+	1×10^{−11}	
^{85m1}Kr	304.871(20) keV			1947	4.480(8) h	β^{−} (78.8%)	^{85}Rb	1/2−		
^{85m1}Kr	304.871(20) keV			1947	4.480(8) h	IT (21.2%)	^{85}Kr	1/2−		
^{85m2}Kr	1991.8(2) keV			1989	1.82(5) μs	IT	^{85}Kr	(17/2+)		
^{86}Kr (Note: Formerly used to define the meter)	36	50	85.9106106247(40)	1920	Observationally Stable (Note: Believed to decay by β^{−}β^{−} to ^{86}Sr)			0+	0.17279(41)	
^{87}Kr	36	51	86.91335476(26)	1943	76.3(5) min	β^{−}	^{87}Rb	5/2+		
^{88}Kr	36	52	87.9144479(28)	1939	2.825(19) h	β^{−}	^{88}Rb	0+		
^{89}Kr	36	53	88.9178354(23)	1943	3.15(4) min	β^{−}	^{89}Rb	3/2+		
^{90}Kr	36	54	89.9195279(20)	1951	32.32(9) s	β^{−}	^{90m}Rb	0+		
^{91}Kr	36	55	90.9238063(24)	1951	8.57(4) s	β^{−}	^{91}Rb	5/2+		
^{91}Kr	36	55	90.9238063(24)	1951	8.57(4) s	β^{−}, n?	^{90}Rb	5/2+		
^{92}Kr	36	56	91.9261731(29)	1951	1.840(8) s	β^{−} (99.97%)	^{92}Rb	0+		
^{92}Kr	36	56	91.9261731(29)	1951	1.840(8) s	β^{−}, n (0.0332%)	^{91}Rb	0+		
^{93}Kr	36	57	92.9311472(27)	1951	1.287(10) s	β^{−} (98.05%)	^{93}Rb	1/2+		
^{93}Kr	36	57	92.9311472(27)	1951	1.287(10) s	β^{−}, n (1.95%)	^{92}Rb	1/2+		
^{94}Kr	36	58	93.934140(13)	1972	212(4) ms	β^{−} (98.89%)	^{94}Rb	0+		
^{94}Kr	36	58	93.934140(13)	1972	212(4) ms	β^{−}, n (1.11%)	^{93}Rb	0+		
^{95}Kr	36	59	94.939711(20)	1994	114(3) ms	β^{−} (97.13%)	^{95}Rb	1/2+		
^{95}Kr	36	59	94.939711(20)	1994	114(3) ms	β^{−}, n (2.87%)	^{94}Rb	1/2+		
^{95}Kr	36	59	94.939711(20)	1994	114(3) ms	β^{−}, 2n?	^{93}Rb	1/2+		
^{95m}Kr	195.5(3) keV			2006	1.582(22) μs	IT	^{95}Kr	(7/2+)		
^{96}Kr	36	60	95.942998(62)	1994	80(8) ms	β^{−} (96.3%)	^{96}Rb	0+		
^{96}Kr	36	60	95.942998(62)	1994	80(8) ms	β^{−}, n (3.7%)	^{95}Rb	0+		
^{97}Kr	36	61	96.94909(14)	1997	62.2(32) ms	β^{−} (93.3%)	^{97}Rb	3/2+#		
^{97}Kr	36	61	96.94909(14)	1997	62.2(32) ms	β^{−}, n (6.7%)	^{96}Rb	3/2+#		
^{97}Kr	36	61	96.94909(14)	1997	62.2(32) ms	β^{−}, 2n?	^{95}Rb	3/2+#		
^{98}Kr	36	62	97.95264(32)#	1997	42.8(36) ms	β^{−} (93.0%)	^{98}Rb	0+		
^{98}Kr	36	62	97.95264(32)#	1997	42.8(36) ms	β^{−}, n (7.0%)	^{97}Rb	0+		
^{98}Kr	36	62	97.95264(32)#	1997	42.8(36) ms	β^{−}, 2n?	^{96}Rb	0+		
^{99}Kr	36	63	98.95878(43)#	1997	40(11) ms	β^{−} (89%)	^{99}Rb	5/2−#		
^{99}Kr	36	63	98.95878(43)#	1997	40(11) ms	β^{−}, n (11%)	^{98}Rb	5/2−#		
^{99}Kr	36	63	98.95878(43)#	1997	40(11) ms	β^{−}, 2n?	^{97}Rb	5/2−#		
^{100}Kr	36	64	99.96300(43)#	1997	12(8) ms	β^{−}	^{100}Rb	0+		
^{100}Kr	36	64	99.96300(43)#	1997	12(8) ms	β^{−}, n?	^{99}Rb	0+		
^{100}Kr	36	64	99.96300(43)#	1997	12(8) ms	β^{−}, 2n?	^{98}Rb	0+		
^{101}Kr	36	65	100.96932(54)#	2010	9# ms [>400 ns]	β^{−}?	^{101}Rb	5/2+#		
^{101}Kr	36	65	100.96932(54)#	2010	9# ms [>400 ns]	β^{−}, n?	^{100}Rb	5/2+#		
^{101}Kr	36	65	100.96932(54)#	2010	9# ms [>400 ns]	β^{−}, 2n?	^{99}Rb	5/2+#		
^{102}Kr	36	66		2021				0+		
^{103}Kr	36	67		2024						
This table header & footer:

== Notable isotopes ==
=== Krypton-81 ===
Krypton-81 (half-life 230,000 years) is useful in determining how old the water beneath the ground is. Radioactive krypton-81 is the product of spallation reactions with cosmic rays striking gases present in the Earth atmosphere, along with the six stable or nearly stable krypton isotopes. The long half-life ensures that the isotope has a uniform concentration in the atmosphere and in surface water; when the water goes underground is supply is no longer replenished and decays, allowing dating of the residence time in deep aquifers in a range of 20,000 to a million years, bridging the gap where other isotopic methods (e.g. carbon-14 dating) lose sensitivity. The same long half-life renders detection of its decay impossible and, therefore, demands some form of mass spectrometry. Even so, technical limitations of the method have traditionally required the sampling of very large volumes of water: several hundred liters or a few cubic meters of water (about a milligram of krypton). This is particularly challenging for dating pore water in deep clay aquitards with very low hydraulic conductivity. More recently, it has been announced that samples an order of magnitude less can be used successfully.

Because cosmic ray production in the atmosphere creates a globally fairly uniform ^{81}Kr/Kr concentration, one can assume a known initial ratio in meteoric water before recharge. There are essentially no significant anthropogenic or in situ geological sources (in typical crustal settings) that would confound the decay clock, making krypton-81 a relatively "clean" choice for geological dating.

The short-lived isomer krypton-81m (half-life 13 seconds) has medical uses but is often considered impractical for use as it must be generated from the rare rubidium-81. It almost entirely decays to the ground state with a monochromatic gamma ray.

=== Krypton-85 ===
Krypton-85 (half-life 10.728 years) is produced by the nuclear fission of uranium and plutonium in nuclear weapons testing and in nuclear reactors, as well as by cosmic rays. An important goal of the Limited Nuclear Test Ban Treaty of 1963 was to eliminate the release of such radioisotopes into the atmosphere, and since 1963 much of that krypton-85 has had time to decay. However, it is almost inevitable that krypton-85 is released during the reprocessing of fuel rods from nuclear reactors, which is far larger-volume than was ever nuclear testing.

==== Atmospheric concentration ====
The atmospheric concentration of krypton-85 around the North Pole is about 30 percent higher than that at the South Pole because nearly all of the world's nuclear reactors and all of its major nuclear reprocessing plants are located in the Northern Hemisphere, well north of the equator and transfer of air between the hemispheres is slow.

The nuclear reprocessing plants with significant capacities are located in the United States, the United Kingdom, the French Republic, the Russian Federation, Mainland China (PRC), Japan, India, and Pakistan.

=== Krypton-86 ===
Krypton-86 was formerly used to define the meter from 1960 until 1983, when the definition of the meter was based on the wavelength of the 606 nm (orange) spectral line of a krypton-86 atom.

== See also ==
Daughter products other than krypton

- Isotopes of rubidium
- Isotopes of bromine
- Isotopes of selenium
