= Chalcogenone =

A chalcogenone is a ketone or a variant containing a different chalcogen atom:

- Thioketone
- Selone
- Telluroketone
