= Selenone =

Selenone can mean:

- Selone, a variant of a carbonyl having a selenium atom in place of the oxygen
- A variant of a sulfone having a selenium atom in place of the sulfur
