= Tellurone =

Tellurone can mean:

- Telluroketone, a variant of a carbonyl having a tellurium atom in place of the oxygen
- A variant of a sulfone having a tellurium atom in place of the sulfur
