= Isotopes of gallium =

Isotopes of gallium (_{31}Ga)
Main isotopes			Decay	
Isotope	abundance	half-life (t_{1/2})	mode	product
^{66}Ga	synth	9.304 h	β^{+}	^{66}Zn
^{67}Ga	synth	3.2617 d	ε	^{67}Zn
^{68}Ga	synth	67.84 min	β^{+}	^{68}Zn
^{69}Ga	60.1%	stable		
^{70}Ga	synth	21.14 min	β^{−}	^{70}Ge
^{70}Ga	synth	21.14 min	ε	^{70}Zn
^{71}Ga	39.9%	stable		
^{72}Ga	synth	14.025 h	β^{−}	^{72}Ge
^{73}Ga	synth	4.86 h	β^{−}	^{73}Ge

Standard atomic weight A_{r}°(Ga)
- 69.723±0.001; 69.723±0.001 (abridged)

Natural gallium (_{31}Ga) consists of a mixture of two stable isotopes: gallium-69 and gallium-71. Synthetic radioisotopes are known with atomic masses ranging from 60 to 89, along with seven nuclear isomers. Most of the isotopes with atomic mass numbers below 69 decay by electron capture and positron emission to isotopes of zinc, while most of the isotopes with masses above 71 beta decay to isotopes of germanium.

The medically important radioisotopes are gallium-67 and gallium-68, used for imaging, and further described below.

== List of isotopes ==
Nuclide (Note: ^{m}Ga – Excited nuclear isomer.)	Z	N	Isotopic mass (Da) (Note: ( ) – Uncertainty (1σ) is given in concise form in parentheses after the corresponding last digits.) (Note: # – Atomic mass marked #: value and uncertainty derived not from purely experimental data, but at least partly from trends from the Mass Surface (TMS).)	Discovery year	Half-life	Decay mode (Note: Modes of decay: EC: / Electron capture; IT: / Isomeric transition; n: / Neutron emission; p: / Proton emission)	Daughter isotope (Note: Bold symbol as daughter – Daughter product is stable.)	Spin and parity (Note: ( ) spin value – Indicates spin with weak assignment arguments.) (Note: # – Values marked # are not purely derived from experimental data, but at least partly from trends of neighboring nuclides (TNN).)	Natural abundance (mole fraction)	
Nuclide	Excitation energy			Discovery year	Half-life	Decay mode	Daughter isotope	Spin and parity	Normal proportion	Range of variation
^{60}Ga	31	29	59.957041(16)	1995	69.4(2) ms	β^{+} (98.4%)	^{60}Zn	(2+)		
^{60}Ga	31	29	59.957041(16)	1995	69.4(2) ms	β^{+}, p (1.6%)	^{59}Cu	(2+)		
^{60}Ga	31	29	59.957041(16)	1995	69.4(2) ms	β^{+}, α? (<0.023%)	^{56}Ni	(2+)		
^{61}Ga	31	30	60.949399(41)	1987	165.9(25) ms	β^{+}	^{61}Zn	3/2−		
^{61}Ga	31	30	60.949399(41)	1987	165.9(25) ms	β^{+}, p? (<0.25%)	^{60}Cu	3/2−		
^{62}Ga	31	31	61.94418964(68)	1978	116.122(21) ms	β^{+}	^{62}Zn	0+		
^{63}Ga	31	32	62.9392942(14)	1965	32.4(5) s	β^{+}	^{63}Zn	3/2−		
^{64}Ga	31	33	63.9368404(15)	1953	2.627(12) min	β^{+}	^{64}Zn	0(+#)		
^{64m}Ga	42.85(8) keV			1974	21.9(7) μs	IT	^{64}Ga	(2+)		
^{65}Ga	31	34	64.93273442(85)	1938	15.133(28) min	β^{+}	^{65}Zn	3/2−		
^{66}Ga	31	35	65.9315898(12)	1937	9.304(8) h	β^{+}	^{66}Zn	0+		
^{67}Ga (Note: Medical radioisotope used in imaging)	31	36	66.9282023(13)	1938	3.2617(4) d	EC	^{67}Zn	3/2−		
^{68}Ga	31	37	67.9279802(15)	1937	67.842(16) min	β^{+}	^{68}Zn	1+		
^{69}Ga	31	38	68.9255735(13)	1923	Stable			3/2−	0.60108(50)	
^{70}Ga	31	39	69.9260219(13)	1937	21.14(5) min	β^{−} (99.59%)	^{70}Ge	1+		
^{70}Ga	31	39	69.9260219(13)	1937	21.14(5) min	EC (0.41%)	^{70}Zn	1+		
^{71}Ga	31	40	70.92470255(87)	1923	Stable			3/2−	0.39892(50)	
^{72}Ga	31	41	71.92636745(88)	1939	14.025(10) h	β^{−}	^{72}Ge	3−		
^{72m}Ga	119.66(5) keV			1959	39.68(13) ms	IT	^{72}Ga	(0+)		
^{73}Ga	31	42	72.9251747(18)	1951	4.86(3) h	β^{−}	^{73}Ge	1/2−		
^{73m}Ga	0.15(9) keV			(2017) (Note: Half-life not measured)	<200 ms	IT?	^{73}Ga	3/2−		
^{73m}Ga	0.15(9) keV			(2017)	<200 ms	β^{−}	^{73}Ge	3/2−		
^{74}Ga	31	43	73.9269457(32)	1956	8.12(12) min	β^{−}	^{74}Ge	(3−)		
^{74m}Ga	59.571(14) keV			1974	9.5(10) s	IT (>75%)	^{74}Ga	(0)(+#)		
^{74m}Ga	59.571(14) keV			1974	9.5(10) s	β^{−}? (<25%)	^{74}Ge	(0)(+#)		
^{75}Ga	31	44	74.92650448(72)	1960	126(2) s	β^{−}	^{75}Ge	3/2−		
^{76}Ga	31	45	75.9288276(21)	1961	30.6(6) s	β^{−}	^{76}Ge	2−		
^{77}Ga	31	46	76.9291543(26)	1968	13.2(2) s	β^{−}	^{77m}Ge (88%)	3/2−		
^{77}Ga	31	46	76.9291543(26)	1968	13.2(2) s	β^{−}	^{77}Ge (12%)	3/2−		
^{78}Ga	31	47	77.9316109(11)	1972	5.09(5) s	β^{−}	^{78}Ge	2−		
^{78m}Ga	498.9(5) keV			2009	110(3) ns	IT	^{78}Ga			
^{79}Ga	31	48	78.9328516(13)	1974	2.848(3) s	β^{−} (99.911%)	^{79}Ge	3/2−		
^{79}Ga	31	48	78.9328516(13)	1974	2.848(3) s	β^{−}, n (0.089%)	^{78}Ge	3/2−		
^{80}Ga	31	49	79.9364208(31)	1974	1.9(1) s	β^{−} (99.14%)	^{80}Ge	6−		
^{80}Ga	31	49	79.9364208(31)	1974	1.9(1) s	β^{−}, n (.86%)	^{79}Ge	6−		
^{80m}Ga (Note: Order of ground state and isomer is uncertain.)	22.45(10) keV			2010	1.3(2) s	β^{−}	^{80}Ge	3−		
^{80m}Ga	22.45(10) keV			2010	1.3(2) s	β^{−}, n?	^{79}Ge	3−		
^{80m}Ga	22.45(10) keV			2010	1.3(2) s	IT	^{80}Ga	3−		
^{81}Ga	31	50	80.9381338(35)	1976	1.217(5) s	β^{−} (87.5%)	^{81m}Ge	5/2−		
^{81}Ga	31	50	80.9381338(35)	1976	1.217(5) s	β^{−}, n (12.5%)	^{80}Ge	5/2−		
^{82}Ga	31	51	81.9431765(26)	1976	600(2) ms	β^{−} (78.8%)	^{82}Ge	2−		
^{82}Ga	31	51	81.9431765(26)	1976	600(2) ms	β^{−}, n (21.2%)	^{81}Ge	2−		
^{82}Ga	31	51	81.9431765(26)	1976	600(2) ms	β^{−}, 2n?	^{80}Ge	2−		
^{82m}Ga	140.7(3) keV			2009	93.5(67) ns	IT	^{82}Ga	(4−)		
^{83}Ga	31	52	82.9471203(28)	1976	310.0(7) ms	β^{−}, n (85%)	^{82}Ge	5/2−#		
^{83}Ga	31	52	82.9471203(28)	1976	310.0(7) ms	β^{−} (15%)	^{83}Ge	5/2−#		
^{83}Ga	31	52	82.9471203(28)	1976	310.0(7) ms	β^{−}, 2n?	^{81}Ge	5/2−#		
^{84}Ga	31	53	83.952663(32)	1991	97.6(12) ms	β^{−} (55%)	^{84}Ge	0−#		
^{84}Ga	31	53	83.952663(32)	1991	97.6(12) ms	β^{−}, n (43%)	^{83}Ge	0−#		
^{84}Ga	31	53	83.952663(32)	1991	97.6(12) ms	β^{−}, 2n (1.6%)	^{82}Ge	0−#		
^{85}Ga	31	54	84.957333(40)	1997	95.3(10) ms	β^{−}, n (77%)	^{84}Ge	(5/2−)		
^{85}Ga	31	54	84.957333(40)	1997	95.3(10) ms	β^{−} (22%)	^{85}Ge	(5/2−)		
^{85}Ga	31	54	84.957333(40)	1997	95.3(10) ms	β^{−}, 2n (1.3%)	^{83}Ge	(5/2−)		
^{86}Ga	31	55	85.96376(43)#	1997	49(2) ms	β^{−}, n (69%)	^{85}Ge			
^{86}Ga	31	55	85.96376(43)#	1997	49(2) ms	β^{−}, 2n (16.2%)	^{84}Ge			
^{86}Ga	31	55	85.96376(43)#	1997	49(2) ms	β^{−} (15%)	^{86}Ge			
^{86m}Ga	97.8(4) keV			2023	320(30) ns	IT	^{86}Ga			
^{87}Ga	31	56	86.96901(54)#	2010	29(4) ms	β^{−}, n (81%)	^{86}Ge	5/2−#		
^{87}Ga	31	56	86.96901(54)#	2010	29(4) ms	β^{−}, 2n (10.2%)	^{85}Ge	5/2−#		
^{87}Ga	31	56	86.96901(54)#	2010	29(4) ms	β^{−} (9%)	^{87}Ge	5/2−#		
^{88}Ga	31	57	87.97596(54)#	2024		β^{−}?	^{88}Ge			
^{88}Ga	31	57	87.97596(54)#	2024		β^{−}, n?	^{87}Ge			
^{89}Ga	31	58		2024						
^{90}Ga	31	59		2026						
This table header & footer:

== Gallium-67 ==
Gallium-67 (^{67}Ga), the longest-lived radioactive isotope of gallium with a half-life of 3.2617 days, decays by electron capture with gamma emission to stable zinc-67. It is a radiopharmaceutical used in gallium scans (as is gallium-68). This isotope is imaged by a gamma camera.

It is usually used as the free ion, Ga^{3+}.

== Gallium-68 ==
Gallium-68 (^{68}Ga) is a positron emitter with a half-life of 67.84 minutes, decaying to stable zinc-68. It is used as a radiopharmaceutical, generated in situ from the electron capture of germanium-68 (half-life 271.05 days) owing to its short half-life. The isotope, where a cyclotron is available, can be made in greater quantities by proton bombardment of ^{68}Zn. This positron-emitting isotope can be imaged efficiently by PET scan: see gallium scan. Gallium-68 is normally used as a radioactive label for a ligand which binds to certain tissues, such as DOTATOC and DOTATATE, which are somatostatin analogues useful for imaging neuroendocrine tumors, which gives it a different tissue uptake specificity from the free ion gallium-67 is usually used as. Such scans are useful in locating neuroendocrine tumors and pancreatic cancer. Thus, octreotide scanning for NET tumors (using indium-111) is being increasingly replaced by gallium-68 DOTATOC scan.

== See also ==
Daughter products other than gallium

- Isotopes of germanium
- Isotopes of zinc
- Isotopes of copper
- Isotopes of nickel
