= Indium-111 WBC scan =

Nuclear medicine procedure

- Synonyms: Indium leukocyte imaging, Indium-111 scan, Indium scan
- ICD-10-PCS: C?1?DZZ (planar); C?2?DZZ (tomographic)
- ICD-9-CM: 92.18
- OPS-301 code: 3-70c
- LOINC: 25032-4, 41772-5, 41836-8, 42711-2

The indium white blood cell scan is a nuclear medicine procedure in which white blood cells (mostly neutrophils) are removed from the patient, tagged with the radioisotope Indium-111, and then injected intravenously into the patient. The tagged leukocytes subsequently localize to areas of relatively new infection. The study is particularly helpful in differentiating conditions such as osteomyelitis from decubitus ulcers for assessment of route and duration of antibiotic therapy.

In imaging of infections, the gallium scan has a sensitivity advantage over the indium white blood cell scan in imaging osteomyelitis (bone infection) of the spine, lung infections and inflammation, and in detecting chronic infections. In part, this is because gallium binds to neutrophil membranes, even after neutrophil death, whereas localization of neutrophils labeled with indium requires them to be in relatively good functional order. However, indium leukocyte imaging is better at localizing acute (i.e., new) infections, where live neutrophils are still rapidly and actively localizing to the infection, for imaging for osteomyelitis that does not involve the spine, and for locating abdominal and pelvic infections.

Both the gallium scan and indium-111 white blood cell imaging may be used to image fever of unknown origin (elevated temperature without an explanation). However, the indium leukocyte scan will localize only to the approximately 25% of such cases which are caused by acute infections, while gallium is more broadly sensitive, localizing to other sources of fever, such as chronic infections and tumors. Gallium may be a better choice for spleen study because gallium does not normally accumulate in the spleen.

== See also ==
- Radiology
- Nuclear medicine
- Gallium scan
- Indium-111
