= Gallium-68 generator =

Device to extract gallium-68 from germanium-68

A germanium-68/gallium-68 generator is a device used to extract the positron-emitting isotope ^{68}Ga of gallium from a source of decaying germanium-68. The parent isotope ^{68}Ge has a half-life of 271.05 days and can be easily utilized for in-hospital production of ^{68}Ga. Its decay product gallium-68 (half-life 67.84 minutes, inconvenient for transport) is extracted and used for certain positron emission tomography nuclear medicine diagnostic procedures, where the radioisotope's relatively short half-life and emission of positrons are useful for creation of 3-dimensional PET scans.

== Parent isotope (^{68}Ge) source ==
The parent isotope germanium-68 is the longest-lived of the radioisotopes of germanium. It has been produced by several methods. In the U.S., it is primarily produced in proton accelerators: the reaction is ^{69}Ga(p,2n)^{68}Ge (the target is the more abundant constituent of natural gallium). At Los Alamos National Laboratory, it may be separated out after proton irradiation of Nb-encapsulated gallium metal. It is also produced at Brookhaven National Laboratories by 40 MeV proton irradiation of a gallium metal target.

A Russian source produces germanium-68 from accelerator-produced helium ion (alpha) irradiation of zinc-66, again after knockout of two neutrons, in the nuclear reaction ^{66}Zn(α,2n)^{68}Ge.

== Mechanism of generator function ==
When loaded with the parent isotope germanium-68, these generators function similarly to technetium-99m generators, in both cases using a process similar to ion chromatography. The stationary phase is either metal-free or alumina, TiO_{2} or SnO_{2}, onto which germanium-68 is adsorbed. The use of metal-free columns allows direct labeling of ^{68}Ga without prepurification, hence making production of gallium-68-radiolabeled compounds more convenient. The mobile phase is a solvent able to elute (wash out) gallium-68 (III) (^{68}Ga^{3+}) after it has been produced by electron capture decay from the immobilized (absorbed) germanium-68.

Currently, such ^{68}Ga (III) is easily eluted with a few mL of 0.05 M, 0.1 M or 1.0 M hydrochloric acid from generators using metal-free tin dioxide or titanium dioxide adsorbents, respectively, within 1 to 2 minutes. With generators of tin dioxide and titanium dioxide-based adsorbents, there once remained more than an hour of pharmaceutical preparation to attach the gallium-68 (III) as a tracer to the pharmaceutical molecules DOTATOC or DOTA-TATE, so that the total preparation time for the resulting radiopharmaceutical is typically longer than the ^{68}Ga isotope half-life. This fact required that these radiopharmaceuticals be made on-site in most cases, and the on-site generator is required to minimize the time losses. However, new kits such as "NETSPOT" for more rapidly preparing Ga-68 edotreotide or DOTATATE from Ga-68(III) ions have increased the flexibility of sourcing of this radiopharmaceutical for Ga-68 endocrine receptor (octreotide) scans. With NETSPOT the preparation of the Ga-68 DOTATATE is immediate once the Ga-68 has been acquired from the generator and mixed with the reagent.

== Indications for gallium-68 use ==
Gallium-67 is useful for imaging old or sterile abscesses. Gallium-68 is useful in direct tumor imaging, especially leukocyte-derived malignancies and prostate cancer metastases.

== See also ==
- Isotopes of germanium
- Positron emission tomography
- Technetium-99m generator
