= Isotopes of selenium =

Isotopes of selenium (_{34}Se)
Main isotopes			Decay	
Isotope	abundance	half-life (t_{1/2})	mode	product
^{72}Se	synth	8.40 d	ε	^{72}As
^{74}Se	0.860%	stable		
^{75}Se	synth	119.78 d	ε	^{75}As
^{76}Se	9.23%	stable		
^{77}Se	7.60%	stable		
^{78}Se	23.7%	stable		
^{79}Se	trace	3.27×10^{5} y	β^{−}	^{79}Br
^{80}Se	49.8%	stable		
^{82}Se	8.82%	8.76×10^{19} y	β^{−}β^{−}	^{82}Kr

Standard atomic weight A_{r}°(Se)
- 78.971±0.008; 78.971±0.008 (abridged)

Selenium has six natural isotopes that occur in significant quantities, along with the trace isotope ^{79}Se, which occurs in minute quantities in uranium ores. Five of these isotopes are stable: ^{74}Se, ^{76}Se, ^{77}Se, ^{78}Se, and ^{80}Se. The last three also occur as fission products, along with ^{79}Se, which has a half-life about 330,000 years, and ^{82}Se, which has the very long half-life of 8.76×10^{19} years as it decays via double beta decay to krypton-82 and for practical purposes can be considered to be stable. There are 23 other unstable isotopes that have been characterized, the longest-lived after ^{79}Se being ^{75}Se with its half-life 119.78 days, ^{72}Se at 8.40 days, and ^{73}Se at 7.15 hours. The others are all under an hour and most do not exceed 38 seconds.

== List of isotopes ==
Nuclide (Note: ^{m}Se – Excited nuclear isomer.)	Z	N	Isotopic mass (Da) (Note: ( ) – Uncertainty (1σ) is given in concise form in parentheses after the corresponding last digits.) (Note: # – Atomic mass marked #: value and uncertainty derived not from purely experimental data, but at least partly from trends from the Mass Surface (TMS).)	Discovery year	Half-life (Note: Bold half-life – nearly stable, half-life longer than age of universe.) (Note: # – Values marked # are not purely derived from experimental data, but at least partly from trends of neighboring nuclides (TNN).)	Decay mode (Note: Modes of decay: EC: / Electron capture; IT: / Isomeric transition; n: / Neutron emission; p: / Proton emission)	Daughter isotope (Note: Bold symbol as daughter – Daughter product is stable.)	Spin and parity (Note: ( ) spin value – Indicates spin with weak assignment arguments.)	Natural abundance (mole fraction)	
Nuclide	Excitation energy			Discovery year	Half-life	Decay mode	Daughter isotope	Spin and parity	Normal proportion	Range of variation
^{63}Se	34	29	62.98191(54)#	2016	13.2(39) ms	β^{+}, p	^{62}Ge	3/2−#		
^{63}Se	34	29	62.98191(54)#	2016	13.2(39) ms	2p? (<0.5%)	^{61}Ge	3/2−#		
^{64}Se	34	30	63.97117(54)#	2005	22.6(2) ms	β^{+}?	^{64}As	0+		
^{64}Se	34	30	63.97117(54)#	2005	22.6(2) ms	β^{+}, p?	^{63}Ge	0+		
^{65}Se	34	31	64.96455(32)#	1993	34.2(7) ms	β^{+}, p (87%)	^{64}Ge	3/2−#		
^{65}Se	34	31	64.96455(32)#	1993	34.2(7) ms	β^{+} (13%)	^{65}As	3/2−#		
^{66}Se	34	32	65.95528(22)#	1993	54(4) ms	β^{+}	^{66}As	0+		
^{66}Se	34	32	65.95528(22)#	1993	54(4) ms	β^{+}, p?	^{65}Ge	0+		
^{67}Se	34	33	66.949994(72)	1991	133(4) ms	β^{+} (99.5%)	^{67}As	5/2−#		
^{67}Se	34	33	66.949994(72)	1991	133(4) ms	β^{+}, p (0.5%)	^{66}Ge	5/2−#		
^{68}Se	34	34	67.94182524(53)	1990	35.5(7) s	β^{+}	^{68}As	0+		
^{69}Se	34	35	68.9394148(16)	1974	27.4(2) s	β^{+} (99.95%)	^{69}As	1/2−		
^{69}Se	34	35	68.9394148(16)	1974	27.4(2) s	β^{+}, p (.052%)	^{68}Ge	1/2−		
^{69m1}Se	38.85(22) keV			1988	2.0(2) μs	IT	^{69}Se	5/2−		
^{69m2}Se	574.0(4) keV			1988	955(16) ns	IT	^{69}Se	9/2+		
^{70}Se	34	36	69.9335155(17)	1950	41.1(3) min	β^{+}	^{70}As	0+		
^{71}Se	34	37	70.9322094(30)	1957	4.74(5) min	β^{+}	^{71}As	(5/2−)		
^{71m1}Se	48.79(5) keV			1982	5.6(7) μs	IT	^{71}Se	(1/2−)		
^{71m2}Se	260.48(10) keV			1982	19.0(5) μs	IT	^{71}Se	(9/2+)		
^{72}Se	34	38	71.9271405(21)	1948	8.40(8) d	EC	^{72}As	0+		
^{73}Se	34	39	72.9267549(80)	1948	7.15(9) h	β^{+}	^{73}As	9/2+		
^{73m}Se	25.71(4) keV			1953	39.8(17) min	IT (72.6%)	^{73}Se	3/2−		
^{73m}Se	25.71(4) keV			1953	39.8(17) min	β^{+} (27.4%)	^{73}As	3/2−		
^{74}Se	34	40	73.922475933(15)	1922	Observationally Stable (Note: Theoretically capable of β^{+}β^{+} decay to ^{74}Ge; half-life is above 2.3×10^{18} y.)			0+	0.0086(3)	
^{75}Se	34	41	74.922522870(78)	1947	119.78(3) d	EC	^{75}As	5/2+		
^{76}Se	34	42	75.919213702(17)	1922	Stable			0+	0.0923(7)	
^{77}Se (Note: Fission product)	34	43	76.919914150(67)	1922	Stable			1/2−	0.0760(7)	
^{77m}Se	161.9223(10) keV			1947	17.36(5) s	IT	^{77}Se	7/2+		
^{78}Se	34	44	77.91730924(19)	1922	Stable			0+	0.2369 (22)	
^{79}Se (Note: Long-lived fission product)	34	45	78.91849925(24)	1950	3.27(28)×10^{5} y	β^{−}	^{79}Br	7/2+		
^{79m}Se	95.77(3) keV			1950	3.900(18) min	IT (99.94%)	^{79}Se	1/2−		
^{79m}Se	95.77(3) keV			1950	3.900(18) min	β^{−} (0.056%)	^{79}Br	1/2−		
^{80}Se	34	46	79.9165218(10)	1922	Observationally Stable (Note: Theoretically capable of β^{−}β^{−} decay to ^{80}Kr)			0+	0.4980(36)	
^{81}Se	34	47	80.9179930(10)	1949	18.45(12) min	β^{−}	^{81}Br	1/2−		
^{81m}Se	103.00(6) keV			1949	57.28(2) min	IT (99.95%)	^{81}Se	7/2+		
^{81m}Se	103.00(6) keV			1949	57.28(2) min	β^{−} (0.051%)	^{81}Br	7/2+		
^{82}Se (Note: Primordial radionuclide)	34	48	81.91669953(50)	1922	8.76(15)×10^{19} y	β^{−}β^{−}	^{82}Kr	0+	0.0882(15)	
^{83}Se	34	49	82.9191186(33)	1937	22.25(4) min	β^{−}	^{83}Br	9/2+		
^{83m}Se	228.92(7) keV			1947	70.1(4) s	β^{−}	^{83}Br	1/2−		
^{84}Se	34	50	83.9184668(21)	1960	3.26(10) min	β^{−}	^{84}Br	0+		
^{85}Se	34	51	84.9222608(28)	1960	32.9(3) s	β^{−}	^{85}Br	(5/2)+		
^{86}Se	34	52	85.9243117(27)	1973	14.3(3) s	β^{−}	^{86}Br	0+		
^{86}Se	34	52	85.9243117(27)	1973	14.3(3) s	β^{−}, n?	^{85}Br	0+		
^{87}Se	34	53	86.9286886(24)	1968	5.50(6) s	β^{−} (99.50%)	^{87}Br	(3/2+)		
^{87}Se	34	53	86.9286886(24)	1968	5.50(6) s	β^{−}, n (0.60%)	^{86}Br	(3/2+)		
^{88}Se	34	54	87.9314175(36)	1970	1.53(6) s	β^{−} (99.01%)	^{88}Br	0+		
^{88}Se	34	54	87.9314175(36)	1970	1.53(6) s	β^{−}, n (0.99%)	^{87}Br	0+		
^{89}Se	34	55	88.9366691(40)	1971	430(50) ms	β^{−} (92.2%)	^{89}Br	5/2+#		
^{89}Se	34	55	88.9366691(40)	1971	430(50) ms	β^{−}, n (7.8%)	^{88}Br	5/2+#		
^{90}Se	34	56	89.94010(35)	1994	210(80) ms	β^{−}	^{90}Br	0+		
^{90}Se	34	56	89.94010(35)	1994	210(80) ms	β^{−}, n?	^{89}Br	0+		
^{91}Se	34	57	90.94570(47)	1975	270(50) ms	β^{−} (79%)	^{91}Br	1/2+#		
^{91}Se	34	57	90.94570(47)	1975	270(50) ms	β^{−}, n (21%)	^{90}Br	1/2+#		
^{91}Se	34	57	90.94570(47)	1975	270(50) ms	β^{−}, 2n?	^{89}Br	1/2+#		
^{92}Se	34	58	91.94984(43)#	1997	90# ms [>300 ns]	β^{−}?	^{92}Br	0+		
^{92}Se	34	58	91.94984(43)#	1997	90# ms [>300 ns]	β^{−}, n?	^{91}Br	0+		
^{92}Se	34	58	91.94984(43)#	1997	90# ms [>300 ns]	β^{−}, 2n?	^{90}Br	0+		
^{92m}Se	3072(2) keV			2012	15.7(7) μs	IT	^{92}Se	(9−)		
^{93}Se	34	59	92.95614(43)#	1997	130# ms [>300 ns]	β^{−}?	^{93}Br	1/2+#		
^{93}Se	34	59	92.95614(43)#	1997	130# ms [>300 ns]	β^{−}, n?	^{92}Br	1/2+#		
^{93}Se	34	59	92.95614(43)#	1997	130# ms [>300 ns]	β^{−}, 2n?	^{91}Br	1/2+#		
^{93m}Se	678.2(7) keV			2012	420(100) ns	IT	^{93}Se			
^{94}Se	34	60	93.96049(54)#	1997	50# ms [>300 ns]	β^{−}?	^{94}Br	0+		
^{94}Se	34	60	93.96049(54)#	1997	50# ms [>300 ns]	β^{−}, n?	^{93}Br	0+		
^{94}Se	34	60	93.96049(54)#	1997	50# ms [>300 ns]	β^{−}, 2n?	^{92}Br	0+		
^{94m}Se	2430.0(6) keV			2020	680(50) ns	IT	^{94}Se	(7−)		
^{95}Se	34	61	94.96730(54)#	2010	70# ms [>400 ns]	β^{−}?	^{95}Br	3/2+#		
^{95}Se	34	61	94.96730(54)#	2010	70# ms [>400 ns]	β^{−}, n?	^{94}Br	3/2+#		
^{95}Se	34	61	94.96730(54)#	2010	70# ms [>400 ns]	β^{−}, 2n?	^{93}Br	3/2+#		
^{96}Se	34	62		2024						
^{97}Se	34	63		2024						
This table header & footer:

== Use of radioisotopes ==
The isotope selenium-75 has radiopharmaceutical uses. For example, it is used in high-dose-rate endorectal brachytherapy, as an alternative to iridium-192.

In paleobiogeochemistry, the ratio in amount of selenium-82 to selenium-76 (i.e, the value of δ^{82/76}Se) can be used to track down the redox conditions on Earth during the Neoproterozoic era in order to gain a deeper understanding of the rapid oxygenation that trigger the emergence of complex organisms.

== See also ==
Daughter products other than selenium

- Isotopes of krypton
- Isotopes of bromine
- Isotopes of arsenic
- Isotopes of germanium
