= Nuclear pharmacy =

Branch of pharmacy focused on radioactive pharmaceuticals

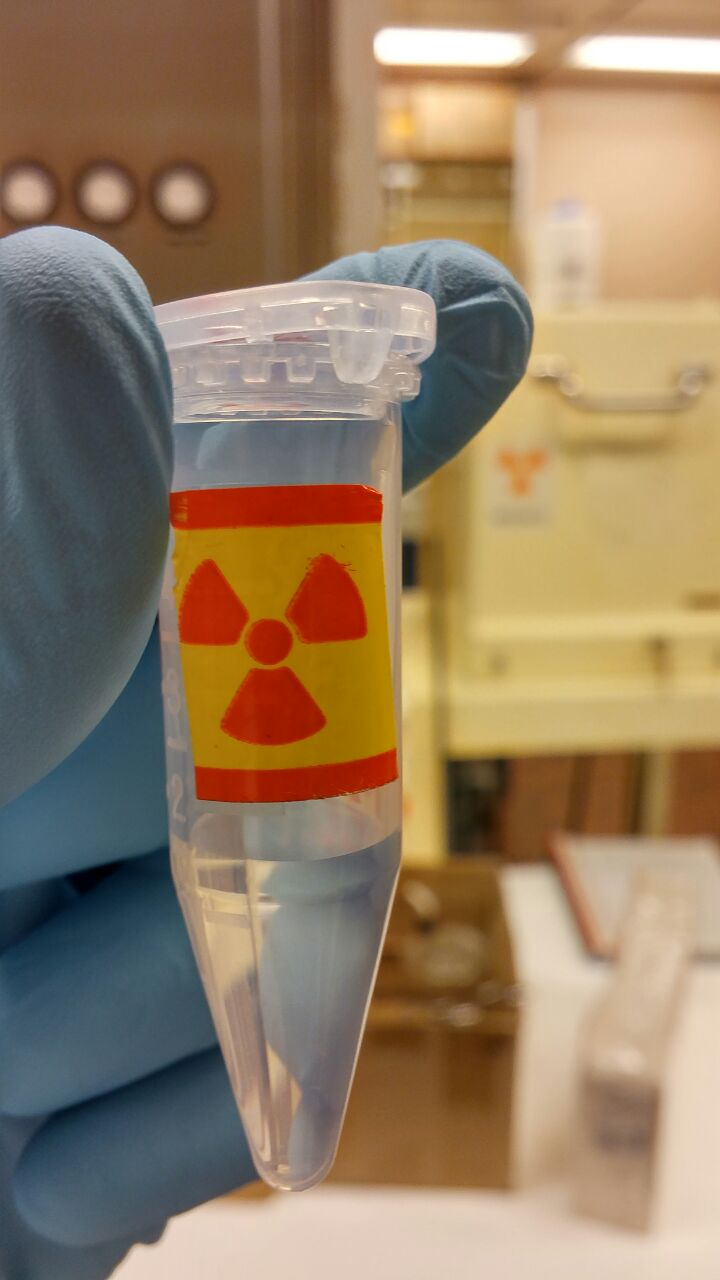
Pharmaceutical drug which emits radiation, used as a diagnostic or therapeutic agent

Nuclear pharmacy, also known as radiopharmacy, involves preparation of radioactive materials for patient administration that will be used to diagnose and treat specific diseases in nuclear medicine. It generally involves the practice of combining a radionuclide tracer with a pharmaceutical component that determines the biological localization in the patient. Radiopharmaceuticals compounded in hospitals are generally not designed to have a therapeutic effect themselves, but there is a risk to staff from radiation exposure and to patients from possible contamination in production. Due to these intersecting risks, nuclear pharmacy is a heavily regulated field. The majority of diagnostic nuclear medicine investigations are performed using technetium-99m.

== History ==
The concept of nuclear pharmacy was first described in 1960 by Captain William H. Briner while at the National Institutes of Health (NIH) in Bethesda, Maryland. Along with Mr. Briner, John E. Christian, who was a professor in the School of Pharmacy at Purdue University, had written articles and contributed in other ways to set the stage of nuclear pharmacy. William Briner started the NIH Radiopharmacy in 1958. John Christian and William Briner were both active on key national committees responsible for the development, regulation and utilization of radiopharmaceuticals. A technetium-99m generator was commercially available, followed by the availability of a number of Tc-99m based radiopharmaceuticals.

In the United States nuclear pharmacy was the first pharmacy specialty established in 1978 by the Board of Pharmacy Specialties.

Various models of production exist internationally. Institutional nuclear pharmacy is typically operated through large medical centers or hospitals while commercial centralized nuclear pharmacies provide their services to subscriber hospitals. They prepare and dispense radiopharmaceuticals as unit doses that are then delivered to the subscriber hospital by nuclear pharmacy personnel.

== Operation ==
A few basic steps are typically involved in technetium-based preparations. First the active technetium is obtained from a radionuclide generator on site, which is then added to a non-radioactive kit containing the pharmaceutical component. Further steps may be required, depending on the materials in question, to ensure full binding of the two components. These procedures are usually carried out in a clean room or isolator to provide radiation shielding and sterile conditions.

For positron emission tomography (PET), fludeoxyglucose (^{18}F) is the most common radiopharmaceutical, with the radioactive component usually obtained from a cyclotron. The short half-life of Fluorine-18 and many other PET isotopes necessitates rapid production. PET radiopharmaceuticals are now often produced by automated computer-controlled systems to reduce complexity and radiation doses to staff.

== Training and regulation ==
Radiopharmacy is a heavily regulated field, as it combines several practices and fields which may come under the purview of multiple regulators and legislation. These include occupational exposure of staff to ionising radiation, preparation of medicines, patient exposure to ionising radiation, transport of radioactive materials, and environmental exposure to ionising radiation. Different regulations may cover the various stages involved in radiopharmacies, ranging from production of "cold" (non-radioactive) kits, to the marketing and distribution of final products.

Staff working in nuclear pharmacies require extensive training on aspects of good manufacturing practice, radiation safety concerns and aseptic dispensing. In the United States an authorised nuclear pharmacist must be a fully qualified pharmacist with evidence of additional training and qualification in nuclear pharmacy practice. Several European Union directives cover radiopharmaceuticals as a special group of medicines, reflecting the wide range of types of producers and staff groups that may be involved. In the UK qualified pharmacists may be involved along with clinical scientists or technologists, with relevant training.

== See also ==
- Nuclear medicine
- Pharmacy
- Radiopharmacology
