= Selone =

Structural analog of a ketone with selenium replacing oxygen

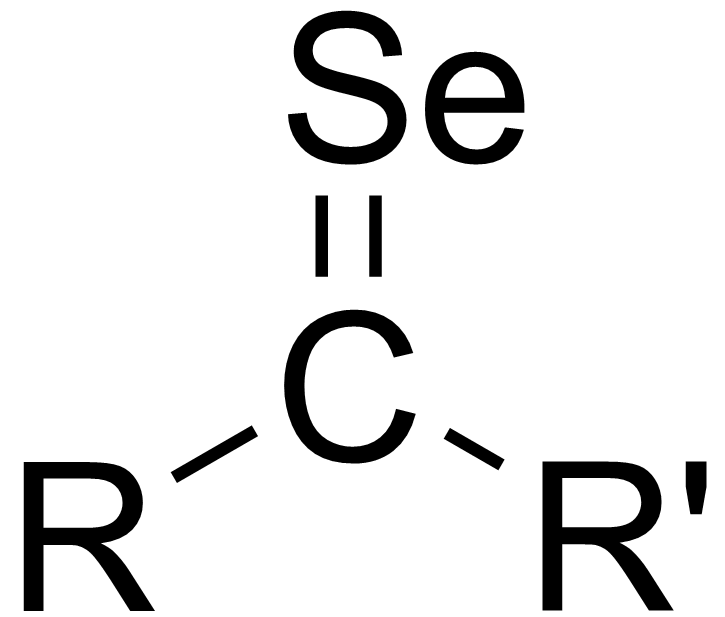
General chemical structure of a selone

In chemistry, a selone (also known as a selenoketone) is the structural analog of a ketone where selenium replaces oxygen. Their primary application is for chemical analysis.

Selenium-77 is one of the isotopes of selenium that is stable and naturally occurring, so selenoketone-containing chemicals can be analyzed by nuclear magnetic resonance spectroscopy (NMR). Selones can be used as chiral derivatizing agents for ^{77}Se-NMR. Chiral oxazolidineselones can be used for stereoselective control of aldol reactions, analogous to the Evans aldol reaction that uses oxazolidinones, which allows ^{77}Se-NMR to be used to determine the diastereomeric ratio of the aldol product.

Selenobenzophenone reversibly dimerizes. It is known to undergo cycloaddition with 1,3-dienes in reactions similar to the Diels-Alder reactions.

== See also ==
- Thioketone
- Telluroketone
