= Isotopes of copper =

Isotopes of copper (_{29}Cu)
Main isotopes			Decay	
Isotope	abundance	half-life (t_{1/2})	mode	product
^{63}Cu	69.2%	stable		
^{64}Cu	synth	12.70 h	β^{+}	^{64}Ni
^{64}Cu	synth	12.70 h	β^{−}	^{64}Zn
^{65}Cu	30.9%	stable		
^{67}Cu	synth	61.83 h	β^{−}	^{67}Zn

Standard atomic weight A_{r}°(Cu)
- 63.546±0.003; 63.546±0.003 (abridged)

Copper (_{29}Cu) has two stable isotopes, ^{63}Cu and ^{65}Cu, along with 28 known radioisotopes from ^{55}Cu to ^{84}Cu. The most stable radioisotope, ^{67}Cu, has a half-life of only 61.83 hours, then follow ^{64}Cu at 12.70 hours and ^{61}Cu at 3.34 hours. The others have half-lives all under an hour and most under a minute. The isotopes with mass below 63 generally undergo positron emission and electron capture to nickel isotopes, while isotopes with mass above 65 generally undergo β^{−} decay to zinc isotopes. The single example in between, ^{64}Cu, decays both ways.

There are at least 10 metastable isomers of copper, of which the most stable is ^{68m}Cu with a half-life of 3.75 minutes.

== List of isotopes ==
Nuclide (Note: ^{m}Cu – Excited nuclear isomer.)	Z	N	Isotopic mass (Da) (Note: ( ) – Uncertainty (1σ) is given in concise form in parentheses after the corresponding last digits.) (Note: # – Atomic mass marked #: value and uncertainty derived not from purely experimental data, but at least partly from trends from the Mass Surface (TMS).)	Discovery year	Half-life	Decay mode (Note: Modes of decay: IT: / Isomeric transition; n: / Neutron emission; p: / Proton emission)	Daughter isotope (Note: Bold symbol as daughter – Daughter product is stable.)	Spin and parity (Note: ( ) spin value – Indicates spin with weak assignment arguments.) (Note: # – Values marked # are not purely derived from experimental data, but at least partly from trends of neighboring nuclides (TNN).)	Natural abundance (mole fraction)	
Nuclide	Excitation energy			Discovery year	Half-life	Decay mode	Daughter isotope	Spin and parity	Normal proportion	Range of variation
^{55}Cu	29	26	54.965854(27)	1987	55.9(15) ms	β^{+}	^{55}Ni	3/2−#		
^{55}Cu	29	26	54.965854(27)	1987	55.9(15) ms	β^{+}, p (?%)	^{54}Co	3/2−#		
^{56}Cu	29	27	55.9585293(69)	1987	80.8(6) ms	β^{+} (99.60%)	^{56}Ni	(4+)		
^{56}Cu	29	27	55.9585293(69)	1987	80.8(6) ms	β^{+}, p (0.40%)	^{55}Co	(4+)		
^{57}Cu	29	28	56.94921169(54)	1976	196.4(7) ms	β^{+}	^{57}Ni	3/2−		
^{58}Cu	29	29	57.94453228(60)	1952	3.204(7) s	β^{+}	^{58}Ni	1+		
^{59}Cu	29	30	58.93949671(57)	1947	81.5(5) s	β^{+}	^{59}Ni	3/2−		
^{60}Cu	29	31	59.9373638(17)	1947	23.7(4) min	β^{+}	^{60}Ni	2+		
^{61}Cu	29	32	60.9334574(10)	1937	3.343(16) h	β^{+}	^{61}Ni	3/2−		
^{62}Cu	29	33	61.9325948(07)	1936	9.672(8) min	β^{+}	^{62}Ni	1+		
^{63}Cu	29	34	62.92959712(46)	1923	Stable			3/2−	0.6915(15)	
^{64}Cu	29	35	63.92976400(46)	1936	12.7004(13) h	β^{+} (61.52%)	^{64}Ni	1+		
^{64}Cu	29	35	63.92976400(46)	1936	12.7004(13) h	β^{−} (38.48%)	^{64}Zn	1+		
^{65}Cu	29	36	64.92778948(69)	1923	Stable			3/2−	0.3085(15)	
^{66}Cu	29	37	65.92886880(70)	1937	5.120(14) min	β^{−}	^{66}Zn	1+		
^{66m}Cu	1154.2(14) keV			1972	600(17) ns	IT	^{66}Cu	(6)−		
^{67}Cu	29	38	66.92772949(96)	1948	61.83(12) h	β^{−}	^{67}Zn	3/2−		
^{68}Cu	29	39	67.9296109(17)	1953	30.9(6) s	β^{−}	^{68}Zn	1+		
^{68m}Cu	721.26(8) keV			1969	3.75(5) min	IT (86%)	^{68}Cu	6−		
^{68m}Cu	721.26(8) keV			1969	3.75(5) min	β^{−} (14%)	^{68}Zn	6−		
^{69}Cu	29	40	68.929429267(15)	1966	2.85(15) min	β^{−}	^{69}Zn	3/2−		
^{69m}Cu	2742.0(7) keV			1997	357(2) ns	IT	^{69}Cu	(13/2+)		
^{70}Cu	29	41	69.9323921(12)	1971	44.5(2) s	β^{−}	^{70}Zn	6−		
^{70m1}Cu	101.1(3) keV			2004	33(2) s	β^{−} (52%)	^{70}Zn	3−		
^{70m1}Cu	101.1(3) keV			2004	33(2) s	IT (48%)	^{70}Cu	3−		
^{70m2}Cu	242.6(5) keV			1971	6.6(2) s	β^{−} (93.2%)	^{70}Zn	1+		
^{70m2}Cu	242.6(5) keV			1971	6.6(2) s	IT (6.8%)	^{70}Cu	1+		
^{71}Cu	29	42	70.9326768(16)	1983	19.4(14) s	β^{−}	^{71}Zn	3/2−		
^{71m}Cu	2755.7(6) keV			1998	271(13) ns	IT	^{71}Cu	(19/2−)		
^{72}Cu	29	43	71.9358203(15)	1983	6.63(3) s	β^{−}	^{72}Zn	2−		
^{72m}Cu	270(3) keV			1998	1.76(3) μs	IT	^{72}Cu	(6−)		
^{73}Cu	29	44	72.9366744(21)	1983	4.20(12) s	β^{−} (99.71%)	^{73}Zn	3/2−		
^{73}Cu	29	44	72.9366744(21)	1983	4.20(12) s	β^{−}, n (0.29%)	^{72}Zn	3/2−		
^{74}Cu	29	45	73.9398749(66)	1987	1.606(9) s	β^{−} (99.93%)	^{74}Zn	2−		
^{74}Cu	29	45	73.9398749(66)	1987	1.606(9) s	β^{−}, n (0.075%)	^{73}Zn	2−		
^{75}Cu	29	46	74.94152382(77)	1985	1.224(3) s	β^{−} (97.3%)	^{75}Zn	5/2−		
^{75}Cu	29	46	74.94152382(77)	1985	1.224(3) s	β^{−}, n (2.7%)	^{74}Zn	5/2−		
^{75m1}Cu	61.7(4) keV			2010	0.310(8) μs	IT	^{75}Cu	1/2−		
^{75m2}Cu	66.2(4) keV			2010	0.149(5) μs	IT	^{75}Cu	3/2−		
^{76}Cu	29	47	75.9452370(21)	1987	656(2) ms	β^{−} (?%)	^{76}Zn	(6−)		
^{76}Cu	29	47	75.9452370(21)	1987	656(2) ms	β^{−}, n (?%)	^{75}Zn	(6−)		
^{76m}Cu (Note: Order of ground state and isomer is uncertain.)	64.8(25) keV			2022	656(2) ms	β^{−} (?%)	^{76}Zn	3−		
^{76m}Cu	64.8(25) keV			2022	656(2) ms	β^{−}, n (?%)	^{75}Zn	3−		
^{77}Cu	29	48	76.9475436(13)	1987	470.3(17) ms	β^{−} (69.9%)	^{77}Zn	5/2−		
^{77}Cu	29	48	76.9475436(13)	1987	470.3(17) ms	β^{−}, n (30.1%)	^{76}Zn	5/2−		
^{78}Cu	29	49	77.9519206(81)	1991	330.7(20) ms	β^{−}, n (50.6%)	^{77}Zn	(6−)		
^{78}Cu	29	49	77.9519206(81)	1991	330.7(20) ms	β^{−} (49.4%)	^{78}Zn	(6−)		
^{78m}Cu	1143+X keV			2023	3.8(4) ms	IT	^{78}Cu	(0−)		
^{79}Cu	29	50	78.95447(11)	1991	241.3(21) ms	β^{−}, n (66%)	^{78}Zn	(5/2−)		
^{79}Cu	29	50	78.95447(11)	1991	241.3(21) ms	β^{−} (34%)	^{79}Zn	(5/2−)		
^{80}Cu	29	51	79.96062(32)#	1995	113.3(64) ms	β^{−}, n (59%)	^{79}Zn			
^{80}Cu	29	51	79.96062(32)#	1995	113.3(64) ms	β^{−} (41%)	^{80}Zn			
^{81}Cu	29	52	80.96574(32)#	2010	73.2(68) ms	β^{−}, n (81%)	^{80}Zn	5/2−#		
^{81}Cu	29	52	80.96574(32)#	2010	73.2(68) ms	β^{−} (19%)	^{81}Zn	5/2−#		
^{82}Cu	29	53	81.97238(43)#	2010	34(7) ms	β^{−}	^{82}Zn			
^{83}Cu	29	54	82.97811(54)#	2017	21# ms [>410 ns]			5/2−#		
^{84}Cu	29	55	83.98527(54)#	2024						
^{85}Cu	29	56		2026						
This table header & footer:

== Copper nuclear magnetic resonance ==
Both stable isotopes of copper (^{63}Cu and ^{65}Cu) have nuclear spin of 3/2−, and thus produce nuclear magnetic resonance spectra, although the spectral lines are broad due to quadrupolar broadening. ^{63}Cu is the more sensitive nucleus while ^{65}Cu yields very slightly narrower signals. Usually though ^{63}Cu NMR is preferred.

== Copper-64 and other potential medical isotopes ==
Copper offers a relatively large number of radioisotopes that are potentially useful for nuclear medicine.

There is growing interest in the use of ^{64}Cu, ^{62}Cu, ^{61}Cu, and ^{60}Cu for diagnostic purposes and ^{67}Cu and ^{64}Cu for targeted radiotherapy. For example, ^{64}Cu has a longer half-life than most positron-emitters (12.7 hours) and is thus ideal for diagnostic PET imaging of biological molecules.

== Copper-76 ==
Copper-76 is a radioactive istope of copper with one long-lived isomer copper-76m, whose half-lives are disputed. A 1990 study by Winger et al. at KEK reported two long-lived states with half-lives of 0.57(6) s and 1.27(3) s, with the longer-lived state being the isomer and having lower spin. Subsequent experiments could not identify the claimed long-lived isomer, with the isomer that was observed later being assigned a spin of 3− based on the levels of ^{76}Zn populated by β^{−} decay. (There is also a significant β^{−}n decay mode to ^{75}Zn.) However, a 2024 experiment at the University of Jyväskylä discovered that the previously observed 3− state is actually the isomer, whose excitation energy is 64.8(25) keV, and the long-lived ground state probably has spin 1+; Canete et al. claim that there is a significant isomeric transition to the ground state. However, Olaizola et al. (2025) found that both the ground state and the isomer have similar half-lives around 656(2) ms, like was found in most previous experiments. Additionally, they find that the non-3− state is probably 6− based on shell model calculations, excluding a significant isomeric transition and preventing identification of the ground state.

== See also ==
Daughter products other than copper

- Isotopes of zinc
- Isotopes of nickel
- Isotopes of cobalt
