= Natural isotopes =

Natural isotopes are either stable isotopes or radioactive isotopes that have a sufficiently long half-life to allow them to exist in substantial concentrations in the Earth (such as bismuth-209, with a half-life of 1.9×10^{19} years, potassium-40 with a half-life of 1.251(3)×10^{9} years), daughter products of those isotopes (such as ^{234}Th, with a half-life of 24 days) or cosmogenic elements. The heaviest stable isotope is lead-208, but the heaviest 'natural' isotope is U-238.

Many elements have both natural and artificial isotopes. For example, hydrogen has three natural isotopes and another four known artificial isotopes. A further distinction among stable natural isotopes is division into primordial (existed when the Solar System formed) and cosmogenic (created by cosmic ray bombardment or other similar processes).

== What defines a natural isotope ==
Natural isotopes must be either stable, have a half-life exceeding about 7×10^{7} years (there are 35 isotopes in this category, see stable isotope for more details) or are generated in large amounts cosmogenically (such as ^{14}C, which has a half-life of only 6000 years but is made by cosmic rays colliding with ^{14}N).

== Naturally occurring radioisotopes ==
Some radioisotopes occur in nature with a half-life of less than 7×10^{7} years (carbon-14: 5,730 ± 40 years, tritium: 12.32 years etc.). They are synthesised all the time by cosmic radiation. A practical use is radiocarbon dating with carbon-14.

== See also ==
- Stable isotope
- Environmental isotopes
