= Isotopes of zinc =

Isotopes of zinc (_{30}Zn)
Main isotopes			Decay	
Isotope	abundance	half-life (t_{1/2})	mode	product
^{64}Zn	49.2%	stable		
^{65}Zn	synth	243.94 d	β^{+}	^{65}Cu
^{66}Zn	27.7%	stable		
^{67}Zn	4.04%	stable		
^{68}Zn	18.4%	stable		
^{69}Zn	synth	56.4 min	β^{−}	^{69}Ga
^{69m}Zn	synth	13.75 h	IT	^{69}Zn
^{69m}Zn	synth	13.75 h	β^{−}	^{69}Ga
^{70}Zn	0.610%	stable		
^{71m}Zn	synth	4.15 h	β^{−}	^{71}Ga
^{72}Zn	synth	46.5 h	β^{−}	^{72}Ga

Standard atomic weight A_{r}°(Zn)
- 65.38±0.02; 65.38±0.02 (abridged)

Natural zinc (_{30}Zn) is composed of the 5 stable isotopes ^{64}Zn, ^{66}Zn, ^{67}Zn, ^{68}Zn, and ^{70}Zn; and ^{64}Zn is the most abundant (48.6% natural abundance). Twenty-eight radioisotopes have been characterized; the most stable is ^{65}Zn with a half-life of 243.94 days, and then ^{72}Zn (half-life 46.5 hours). All other isotopes have half-lives of less than 14 hours and most of these have half-lives of less than 1 second. This element also has 10 meta states.

Zinc has been proposed as a "salting" material for nuclear weapons. A jacket of isotopically enriched ^{64}Zn, irradiated by the intense high-energy neutron flux from an exploding thermonuclear weapon, would be transmuted to ^{65}Zn, which emits 1.115 MeV of gamma radiation in about half of decays, and would significantly increase the radioactivity of the weapon's fallout for several years. Such a weapon is not known to have ever been built, tested, or used.

== List of isotopes ==
Nuclide (Note: ^{m}Zn – Excited nuclear isomer.)	Z	N	Isotopic mass (Da) (Note: ( ) – Uncertainty (1σ) is given in concise form in parentheses after the corresponding last digits.) (Note: # – Atomic mass marked #: value and uncertainty derived not from purely experimental data, but at least partly from trends from the Mass Surface (TMS).)	Discovery year	Half-life (Note: # – Values marked # are not purely derived from experimental data, but at least partly from trends of neighboring nuclides (TNN).)	Decay mode (Note: Modes of decay: IT: / Isomeric transition; n: / Neutron emission; p: / Proton emission)	Daughter isotope (Note: Bold symbol as daughter – Daughter product is stable.)	Spin and parity (Note: ( ) spin value – Indicates spin with weak assignment arguments.)	Natural abundance (mole fraction)	
Nuclide	Excitation energy			Discovery year	Half-life	Decay mode	Daughter isotope	Spin and parity	Normal proportion	Range of variation
^{54}Zn	30	24	53.99388(23)#	2005	1.8(5) ms	2p	^{52}Ni	0+		
^{55}Zn	30	25	54.98468(43)#	2001	19.8(13) ms	β^{+}, p (91.0%)	^{54}Ni	5/2−#		
^{55}Zn	30	25	54.98468(43)#	2001	19.8(13) ms	β^{+} (9.0%)	^{55}Cu	5/2−#		
^{56}Zn	30	26	55.97274(43)#	2001	32.4(7) ms	β^{+}, p (88.0%)	^{55}Ni	0+		
^{56}Zn	30	26	55.97274(43)#	2001	32.4(7) ms	β^{+} (12.0%)	^{56}Cu	0+		
^{57}Zn	30	27	56.96506(22)#	1976	45.7(6) ms	β^{+}, p (87%)	^{56}Ni	7/2−#		
^{57}Zn	30	27	56.96506(22)#	1976	45.7(6) ms	β^{+} (13%)	^{57}Cu	7/2−#		
^{58}Zn	30	28	57.954590(54)	1986	86.0(19) ms	β^{+} (99.3%)	^{58}Cu	0+		
^{58}Zn	30	28	57.954590(54)	1986	86.0(19) ms	β^{+}, p (0.7%)	^{57}Ni	0+		
^{59}Zn	30	29	58.94931189(81)	1981	178.7(13) ms	β^{+} (99.90%)	^{59}Cu	3/2−		
^{59}Zn	30	29	58.94931189(81)	1981	178.7(13) ms	β^{+}, p (0.10%)	^{58}Ni	3/2−		
^{60}Zn	30	30	59.94184132(59)	1955	2.38(5) min	β^{+}	^{60}Cu	0+		
^{61}Zn	30	31	60.939507(17)	1955	89.1(2) s	β^{+}	^{61}Cu	3/2−		
^{62}Zn	30	32	61.93433336(66)	1948	9.193(15) h	β^{+}	^{62}Cu	0+		
^{63}Zn	30	33	62.9332111(17)	1937	38.47(5) min	β^{+}	^{63}Cu	3/2−		
^{64}Zn	30	34	63.92914178(69)	1922	Observationally Stable (Note: Believed to undergo β^{+}β^{+} decay to ^{64}Ni with a half-life over 6.0×10^{16} y)			0+	0.4917(75)	
^{65}Zn	30	35	64.92924053(69)	1939	243.94(4) d	EC (98.579(7)%)	^{65}Cu	5/2−		
^{65}Zn	30	35	64.92924053(69)	1939	243.94(4) d	β^{+} (1.421(7)%)	^{65}Cu	5/2−		
^{65m}Zn	53.928(10) keV			1960	1.6(6) μs	IT	^{65}Zn	1/2−		
^{66}Zn	30	36	65.92603364(80)	1922	Stable			0+	0.2773(98)	
^{67}Zn	30	37	66.92712742(81)	1928	Stable			5/2−	0.0404(16)	
^{67m1}Zn	93.312(5) keV			1953	9.15(7) μs	IT	^{67}Zn	1/2−		
^{67m2}Zn	604.48(5) keV			1971	333(14) ns	IT	^{67}Zn	9/2+		
^{68}Zn	30	38	67.92484423(84)	1922	Stable			0+	0.1845(63)	
^{69}Zn	30	39	68.92655036(85)	1937	56.4(9) min	β^{−}	^{69}Ga	1/2−		
^{69m}Zn	438.636(18) keV			1939	13.747(11) h	IT (99.97%)	^{69}Zn	9/2+		
^{69m}Zn	438.636(18) keV			1939	13.747(11) h	β^{−} (0.033%)	^{69}Ga	9/2+		
^{70}Zn	30	40	69.9253192(21)	1922	Observationally Stable (Note: Believed to undergo β^{−}β^{−} decay to ^{70}Ge with a half-life over 3.8×10^{18} y)			0+	0.0061(10)	
^{71}Zn	30	41	70.9277196(28)	1955	2.40(5) min	β^{−}	^{71}Ga	1/2−		
^{71m}Zn	157.7(13) keV			1955	4.148(12) h	β^{−}	^{71}Ga	9/2+		
^{71m}Zn	157.7(13) keV			1955	4.148(12) h	IT?	^{71}Zn	9/2+		
^{72}Zn	30	42	71.9268428(23)	1951	46.5(1) h	β^{−}	^{72}Ga	0+		
^{73}Zn	30	43	72.9295826(20)	1972	24.5(2) s	β^{−}	^{73}Ga	1/2−		
^{73m}Zn	195.5(2) keV			1998	13.0(2) ms	IT	^{73}Zn	5/2+		
^{74}Zn	30	44	73.9294073(27)	1972	95.6(12) s	β^{−}	^{74}Ga	0+		
^{75}Zn	30	45	74.9328402(21)	1974	10.2(2) s	β^{−}	^{75}Ga	7/2+		
^{75m}Zn	126.94(9) keV			2011	5# s	β^{−}?	^{75}Ga	1/2−		
^{75m}Zn	126.94(9) keV			2011	5# s	IT?	^{75}Zn	1/2−		
^{76}Zn	30	46	75.9331150(16)	1974	5.7(3) s	β^{−}	^{76}Ga	0+		
^{77}Zn	30	47	76.9368872(21)	1977	2.08(5) s	β^{−}	^{77}Ga	7/2+		
^{77m}Zn	772.440(15) keV			1986	1.05(10) s	β^{−} (66%)	^{77}Ga	1/2−		
^{77m}Zn	772.440(15) keV			1986	1.05(10) s	IT (34%)	^{77}Zn	1/2−		
^{78}Zn	30	48	77.9382892(21)	1977	1.47(15) s	β^{−}	^{78}Ga	0+		
^{78}Zn	30	48	77.9382892(21)	1977	1.47(15) s	β^{−}, n?	^{77}Ga	0+		
^{78m}Zn	2673.7(6) keV			2000	320(6) ns	IT	^{78}Zn	(8+)		
^{79}Zn	30	49	78.9426381(24)	1986	746(42) ms	β^{−} (98.3%)	^{79}Ga	9/2+		
^{79}Zn	30	49	78.9426381(24)	1986	746(42) ms	β^{−}, n (1.7%)	^{78}Ga	9/2+		
^{79m}Zn	942(10) keV			2015	>200 ms	β^{−}?	^{79}Ga	1/2+		
^{79m}Zn	942(10) keV			2015	>200 ms	IT?	^{79}Zn	1/2+		
^{80}Zn	30	50	79.9445529(28)	1986	562.2(30) ms	β^{−} (98.64%)	^{80}Ga	0+		
^{80}Zn	30	50	79.9445529(28)	1986	562.2(30) ms	β^{−}, n (1.36%)	^{79}Ga	0+		
^{81}Zn	30	51	80.9504026(54)	1991	299.4(21) ms	β^{−} (77%)	^{81}Ga	(1/2+, 5/2+)		
^{81}Zn	30	51	80.9504026(54)	1991	299.4(21) ms	β^{−}, n (23%)	^{80}Ga	(1/2+, 5/2+)		
^{81}Zn	30	51	80.9504026(54)	1991	299.4(21) ms	β^{−}, 2n?	^{79}Ga	(1/2+, 5/2+)		
^{82}Zn	30	52	81.9545741(33)	1997	177.9(25) ms	β^{−}, n (69%)	^{81}Ga	0+		
^{82}Zn	30	52	81.9545741(33)	1997	177.9(25) ms	β^{−} (31%)	^{82}Ga	0+		
^{82}Zn	30	52	81.9545741(33)	1997	177.9(25) ms	β^{−}, 2n?	^{80}Ga	0+		
^{83}Zn	30	53	82.96104(32)#	1997	100(3) ms	β^{−}, n (71%)	^{82}Ga	3/2+#		
^{83}Zn	30	53	82.96104(32)#	1997	100(3) ms	β^{−} (29%)	^{83}Ga	3/2+#		
^{83}Zn	30	53	82.96104(32)#	1997	100(3) ms	β^{−}, 2n?	^{81}Ga	3/2+#		
^{84}Zn	30	54	83.96583(43)#	2010	54(8) ms	β^{−}, n (73%)	^{83}Ga	0+		
^{84}Zn	30	54	83.96583(43)#	2010	54(8) ms	β^{−} (27%)	^{84}Ga	0+		
^{84}Zn	30	54	83.96583(43)#	2010	54(8) ms	β^{−}, 2n?	^{82}Ga	0+		
^{85}Zn	30	55	84.97305(54)#	2010	40# ms [>400 ns]	β^{−}?	^{85}Ga	5/2+#		
^{85}Zn	30	55	84.97305(54)#	2010	40# ms [>400 ns]	β^{−}, n?	^{84}Ga	5/2+#		
^{85}Zn	30	55	84.97305(54)#	2010	40# ms [>400 ns]	β^{−}, 2n?	^{83}Ga	5/2+#		
^{86}Zn	30	56	85.97846(54)#	2024		β^{−}?	^{86}Ga	0+		
^{86}Zn	30	56	85.97846(54)#	2024		β^{−}, n?	^{85}Ga	0+		
^{87}Zn	30	57		2024						
This table header & footer:

== See also ==
Daughter products other than zinc

- Isotopes of gallium
- Isotopes of copper
- Isotopes of nickel
