= Telluroketone =

Class of chemical compounds

General struct telluroketone group

A telluroketone is an analog of a ketone in which the oxygen atom has been replaced by a tellurium atom. This change makes the functional group less stable, due to the larger size and lower electronegativity of tellurium compared to oxygen. Telluroketones consequently require greater steric and electronic stabilization.

Telluroketones are a topic of scientific interest in organometallic chemistry due to their unique electronic and structural properties. In particular, they contribute to large HALA effects during NMR spectroscopy.

== See also ==
- Thioketone
- Selone
