= Technetium-99m generator =

Device

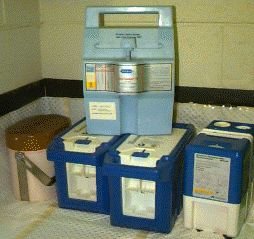
Five modern technetium-99m generators

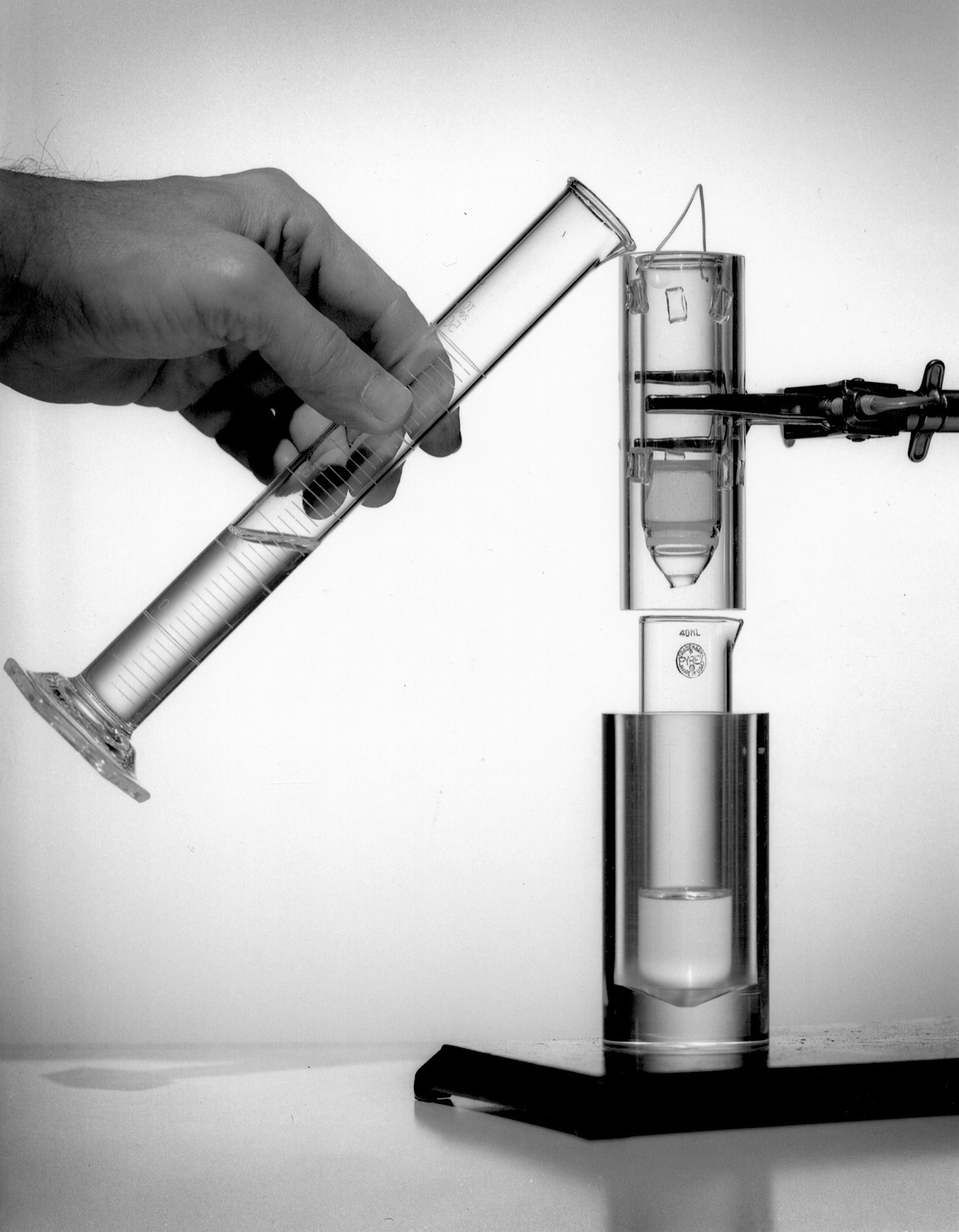
The first technetium-99m generator, unshielded, 1958. A Tc-99m pertechnetate solution is being eluted from Mo-99 molybdate bound to a chromatographic substrate

A technetium-99m generator, or colloquially a technetium cow or moly cow, is a device used to extract the metastable isotope ^{99m}Tc of technetium from a decaying sample of molybdenum-99. ^{99}Mo has a half-life of 66 hours and can be easily transported over long distances to hospitals where its decay product technetium-99m (with a half-life of only 6 hours, inconvenient for transport) is extracted and used for a variety of nuclear medicine diagnostic procedures, where its short half-life is very useful.

== Parent isotope source ==
^{99}Mo can be obtained by the neutron activation (n,γ reaction) of ^{98}Mo in a high-neutron-flux reactor. However, the most frequently used method is through fission of uranium-235 in a nuclear reactor. While most reactors currently engaged in ^{99}Mo production use highly enriched uranium-235 targets, proliferation concerns have prompted some producers to transition to low-enriched uranium targets. The target is irradiated with neutrons to form ^{99}Mo as a fission product (with 6.1% yield). Molybdenum-99 is then separated from unreacted uranium and other fission products in a hot cell.

== Generator invention and history ==
^{99m}Tc remained a scientific curiosity until the 1950s when Powell Richards realized the potential of technetium-99m as a medical radiotracer and promoted its use among the medical community. While Richards was in charge of the radioisotope production at the Hot Lab Division of the Brookhaven National Laboratory, Walter Tucker and Margaret Greene were working on how to improve the separation process purity of the short-lived eluted daughter product iodine-132 from tellurium-132, its 3.2-days parent, produced in the Brookhaven Graphite Research Reactor. They detected a trace contaminant which proved to be ^{99m}Tc, which was coming from ^{99}Mo and was following tellurium in the chemistry of the separation process for other fission products. Based on the similarities between the chemistry of the tellurium-iodine parent-daughter pair, Tucker and Greene developed the first technetium-99m generator in 1958. It was not until 1960 that Richards became the first to suggest the idea of using technetium as a medical tracer.

== Generator function and mechanism ==
Technetium-99m's short half-life of 6 hours makes long-term storage impossible. Transport of ^{99m}Tc from the limited number of production sites to radio pharmacies (for manufacture of specific radiopharmaceuticals) and other end users would be complicated by the need to significantly overproduce to have sufficient remaining activity after long journeys. Instead, the longer-lived parent nuclide ^{99}Mo can be supplied to radio pharmacies in a generator, after its extraction from the neutron-irradiated uranium targets and its purification in dedicated processing facilities. Radio pharmacies may be hospital-based or stand-alone facilities, and in many cases will subsequently distribute ^{99m}Tc radiopharmaceuticals to regional nuclear medicine departments. Development in direct production of ^{99m}Tc, without first producing the parent ^{99}Mo, precludes the use of generators; however, this is uncommon and relies on suitable production facilities close to radio pharmacies.

=== Production ===
Generators provide radiation shielding for transport and to minimize the extraction work done at the medical facility. A typical dose rate at 1 metre from ^{99m}Tc generator is 20–50 μSv/h during transport.

These generators' output declines with time and must be replaced weekly, since the half-life of ^{99}Mo is still only 66 hours. Since the half-life of the parent nuclide (^{99}Mo) is much longer than that of the daughter nuclide (^{99m}Tc), 50% of equilibrium activity is reached within one daughter half-life, 75% within two daughter half-lives. Hence, removing the daughter nuclide (elution process) from the generator ("milking" the cow) is reasonably done as often as every 6 hours in a ^{99}Mo/^{99m}Tc generator.

=== Separation ===
Most commercial ^{99}Mo/^{99m}Tc generators use column chromatography, in which ^{99}Mo in the form of molybdate, MoO_{4}^{2−} is adsorbed onto acid alumina (Al_{2}O_{3}). When the ^{99}Mo decays it forms pertechnetate TcO_{4}^{−}, which, because of its single charge, is less tightly bound to the alumina. Pouring normal saline solution through the column of immobilized ^{99}Mo elutes the soluble ^{99m}Tc, resulting in a saline solution containing the ^{99m}Tc as pertechnetate, with sodium as the counterion.

The solution of sodium pertechnetate may then be added in an appropriate concentration to the pharmaceutical kit to be used, or sodium pertechnetate can be used directly without pharmaceutical tagging for specific procedures requiring only the ^{99m}TcO_{4}^{−} as the primary radiopharmaceutical. A large percentage of the ^{99m}Tc generated by a ^{99}Mo/^{99m}Tc generator is produced in the first 3 parent half-lives, or approximately one week. Hence, clinical nuclear medicine units purchase at least one such generator per week or order several in a staggered fashion.

== Isomeric ratio ==
When the generator is left unused, ^{99}Mo decays to ^{99m}Tc, which in turn decays to ^{99}Tc. The half-life of ^{99}Tc is far longer than its metastable isomer, so the ratio of ^{99}Tc to ^{99m}Tc increases over time. Both isomers are carried out by the elution process and react equally well with the ligand, but the ^{99}Tc is an impurity useless to imaging (and cannot be separated).

The generator is washed of ^{99}Tc and ^{99m}Tc at the end of the manufacturing process of the generator, but the ratio of ^{99}Tc to ^{99m}Tc then builds up again during transport or any other period when the generator is left unused. The first few elutions will have reduced effectiveness because of this high ratio.
