= Proton emission =

Type of radioactive decay

The decay of a proton rich nucleus A populates excited states of a daughter nucleus B by β+ emission or electron capture (EC). Those excited states that lie below the separation energy for protons (Sp) decay by γ emission towards the ground state of daughter B. For the higher excited states a competitive decay channel of proton emission to the granddaughter C exists, called β-delayed proton emission.

Proton emission (also known as proton radioactivity) is a rare type of radioactive decay in which a proton is ejected from a nucleus. Proton emission can occur from high-lying excited states in a nucleus following a beta decay, in which case the process is known as beta-delayed proton emission, or can occur from the ground state (or a low-lying isomer) of very proton-rich nuclei, in which case the process is very similar to alpha decay. For a proton to escape a nucleus, the proton separation energy must be negative (Sp < 0)—the proton is therefore unbound, and tunnels out of the nucleus in a finite time. The rate of proton emission is governed by the nuclear, Coulomb, and centrifugal potentials of the nucleus, where centrifugal potential affects a large part of the rate of proton emission. The half-life of a nucleus with respect to proton emission is affected by the proton energy and its orbital angular momentum. Proton emission is not seen in naturally occurring isotopes; proton emitters can be produced via nuclear reactions, usually using linear particle accelerators.

Although prompt (i.e. not beta-delayed) proton emission was observed from an isomer in cobalt-53 as early as 1969, no other proton-emitting states were found until 1981, when the proton radioactive ground states of lutetium-151 and thulium-147 were observed at experiments at the GSI in West Germany. Research in the field flourished after this breakthrough, and to date more than 25 isotopes have been found to exhibit proton emission. The study of proton emission has aided the understanding of nuclear deformation, masses, and structure, and it is a pure example of quantum tunneling.

In 2002, the simultaneous emission of two protons was observed from the nucleus iron-45 in experiments at GSI and GANIL (Grand Accélérateur National d'Ions Lourds at Caen). In 2005 it was experimentally determined (at the same facility) that zinc-54 can also undergo double proton decay.

Aluminum-20, the lightest isotope of aluminum, is the only nucleus discovered so far that decays by triple proton emission. However, it does not eject all three protons at once; in the ground state, it first decays by single proton emission into magnesium-19, which then decays by double proton emission into its final daughter nuclide of neon-17.

== See also ==
- Nuclear drip line
- Diproton (a particle possibly involved in double proton decay)
- Free neutron
- Neutron emission
- Photodisintegration
