= Synthetic radioisotope =

Radioisotope that is man-made and is not found in nature

A synthetic radioisotope is a radionuclide that is not found in nature: no natural process or mechanism exists which produces it, or it is so unstable that it decays away in a very short period of time. Most known radioisotopes are synthetically made; only 84 out of over 3,000 radioisotopes are found in nature.

The first synthetic radioisotope was phosphorus-30, which was produced in 1934 by Frédéric Joliot-Curie and Irène Joliot-Curie using aluminum foil and a polonium source . The two won the 1935 Nobel Prize in chemistry for their discovery. The discovery of artificial radioactivity enabled the development of nuclear weapons based on plutonium-239, including the Fat Man atomic bomb.

In the modern day, synthetic radioisotopes have many other applications. They are used in medical imaging (such as technetium-99m), radiotherapy, nuclear energy sources (plutonium-239), and ionization-type smoke detectors (americium-241). These synthetic radioisotopes are manufactured in nuclear reactors using neutron irradiation, and in particle accelerators using charged particles.

== Production ==
Some synthetic radioisotopes are extracted from spent nuclear reactor fuel rods. For example, it is estimated that by 1994, global nuclear reactors had produced a cumulative total of 49,000 terabecquerels (approximately 78 metric tons) of technetium-99 (^{99}Tc). This anthropogenic production makes the isotope far more abundant on Earth than any trace amounts occurring naturally.

Some synthetic isotopes are produced in significant quantities by fission but are not yet being reclaimed. Other isotopes are manufactured by neutron irradiation of parent isotopes in a nuclear reactor (for example, technetium-97 can be made by neutron irradiation of ruthenium-96) or by bombarding parent isotopes with high energy particles from a particle accelerator.

Many isotopes, including radiopharmaceuticals, are produced in cyclotrons. For example, the synthetic fluorine-18 and oxygen-15 are widely used in positron emission tomography.

== Uses ==
Most synthetic radioisotopes have a short half-life. Though a health hazard, radioactive materials have many medical and industrial uses.

=== Nuclear medicine ===
The field of nuclear medicine covers use of radioisotopes for diagnosis or treatment.

==== Diagnosis ====
Radioactive tracer compounds, radiopharmaceuticals, are used to observe the function of various organs and body systems. These compounds use a chemical tracer which is attracted to or concentrated by the activity which is being studied. That chemical tracer incorporates a short lived radioactive isotope, usually one which emits a gamma ray which is energetic enough to travel through the body and be captured outside by a gamma camera to map the concentrations. Gamma cameras and other similar detectors are highly efficient, and the tracer compounds are generally very effective at concentrating at the areas of interest, so the total amounts of radioactive material needed are very small.

The metastable nuclear isomer technetium-99m is a gamma-ray emitter widely used for medical diagnostics because it has a short half-life of 6 hours, but can be easily made in the hospital using a technetium-99m generator. Weekly global demand for the parent isotope molybdenum-99 was 440 TBq (12,000 Ci) in 2010, overwhelmingly provided by fission of uranium-235.

==== Treatment ====
Several radioisotopes and compounds are used for medical treatment, usually by bringing the radioactive isotope to a high concentration in the body near a particular organ. For example, iodine-131 is used for treating some disorders and tumors of the thyroid gland.

=== Industrial radiation sources ===
Alpha, beta, and gamma emissions from synthetic radioisotopes are mostly used in the industry because they can penetrate through solid materials and provide high-energy radiation. In the petroleum industry, these isotopes help map rock layers and fluid levels in oil and gas wells. In industrial radiography, gamma sources like cobalt-60 or iridium-192 inspect metal parts and welds for hidden cracks without damaging the material. In manufacturing, beta emitters are used in sensors to monitor the thickness of paper, plastic, or metal foils during production.

These isotopes are also used for public safety and food processing. For homeland security, they are used in scanners to detect explosives or other dangerous materials in cargo. In food irradiation, gamma rays kill bacteria and pests to make food safer and extend its shelf life. They act as tracers in underground detection to track water flow or find leaks in buried pipes.
