= Positron emission =

Type of radioactive decay

Positron emission, beta plus decay, or β^{+} decay is a subtype of radioactive decay called beta decay, in which a proton inside a radionuclide nucleus is converted into a neutron while releasing a positron and an electron neutrino (ν_{e}). Positron emission is mediated by the weak force. The positron is a type of beta particle (β^{+}), the other beta particle being the electron (β^{−}) emitted from the β^{−} decay of a nucleus.

An example of positron emission (β^{+} decay) is shown with magnesium-23 decaying into sodium-23:

^{23}_{12}Mg → ^{23}_{11}Na + e^{+} + ν_{e}

Because positron emission decreases proton number relative to neutron number, positron decay happens typically in large proton-rich radionuclides. Positron decay results in nuclear transmutation, changing an atom of one chemical element into an atom of an element with an atomic number that is less by one unit.

Positron emission occurs extremely rarely in nature on Earth. Known instances include cosmic ray interactions and the decay of certain isotopes, such as potassium-40. This rare form of potassium makes up only 0.012% of the element on Earth and has a 1 in 100,000 chance of decaying via positron emission.

Positron emission should not be confused with electron emission or beta minus decay (β^{−} decay), which occurs when a neutron turns into a proton and the nucleus emits an electron and an antineutrino.

Positron emission is different from proton decay, the hypothetical decay of protons, not necessarily those bound with neutrons, not necessarily through the emission of a positron, and not as part of nuclear physics, but rather of particle physics.

== Discovery of positron emission ==
In 1934 Frédéric and Irène Joliot-Curie bombarded aluminium with alpha particles (emitted by polonium) to effect the nuclear reaction ^{4}_{2}He + ^{27}_{13}Al → ^{30}_{15}P + ^{1}_{0}n, and observed that the product isotope ^{30}_{15}P emits a positron identical to those found in cosmic rays by Carl David Anderson in 1932. This was the first example of β^{+} decay (positron emission). The Curies termed the phenomenon "artificial radioactivity", because ^{30}_{15}P is a short-lived nuclide which does not exist in nature. The discovery of artificial radioactivity would be cited when the husband-and-wife team won the Nobel Prize.

== Positron-emitting isotopes ==
Isotopes which undergo this decay and thereby emit positrons include, but are not limited to: carbon-11, nitrogen-13, oxygen-15, fluorine-18, copper-64, gallium-68, bromine-78, rubidium-82, yttrium-86, zirconium-89, sodium-22, aluminium-26, potassium-40, strontium-83, and iodine-124. As an example, the following equation describes the beta plus decay of carbon-11 to boron-11, emitting a positron and a neutrino:

^{11}_{6}C	→	^{11}_{5}B	+	e^{+}	+	ν_{e}	+	0.96 MeV

The energy emitted depends on the isotope that is decaying; the figure of 0.96 MeV applies only to the decay of carbon-11.

== Emission mechanism ==
Inside protons and neutrons, there are fundamental particles called quarks. The two most common types of quarks are up quarks, which have a charge of +2/3, and down quarks, with a −1/3 charge. Quarks arrange themselves in sets of three such that they make protons and neutrons. In a proton, whose charge is +1, there are two up quarks and one down quark (2/3 + 2/3 − 1/3 = 1). Neutrons, with no charge, have one up quark and two down quarks (2/3 − 1/3 − 1/3 = 0). Via the weak interaction, quarks can change flavor from down to up, resulting in electron emission. Positron emission happens when an up quark changes into a down quark, effectively converting a proton to a neutron.

Nuclei which decay by positron emission may also decay by electron capture. For low-energy decays, electron capture is energetically favored by 2m_{e}c^{2} = 1.022 MeV, since the final state has an electron removed rather than a positron added. As the energy of the decay goes up, so does the branching fraction of positron emission. However, if the energy difference is less than 2m_{e}c^{2}, the positron emission cannot occur and electron capture is the sole decay mode. Certain otherwise electron-capturing isotopes (for instance, ^{7}Be) are stable in galactic cosmic rays, because the electrons are stripped away and the decay energy is too small for positron emission.

== Energy conservation ==
A positron is ejected from the parent nucleus, but the daughter (Z−1) atom still has Z atomic electrons from the parent, i.e. the daughter is a negative ion (at least immediately after the positron emission). Since tables of masses are for atomic masses, $_Z^A \textrm {X} \rightarrow _{Z-1}^A \textrm {Y} +_{+1}^0 \textrm e^{+}+_{-1}^0 \textrm e^{-}$ , and, since the mass of the positron is identical to that of the electron, the overall result is that the mass-energy of two electrons is required, and the β^{+} decay is energetically possible if and only if the mass of the parent atom exceeds the mass of the daughter atom by at least two electron masses (2m_{e} c^{2} = 1.022 MeV).

Isotopes which increase in mass under the conversion of a proton to a neutron, or which decrease in mass by less than 2m_{e}, cannot spontaneously decay by positron emission.

== Application ==
These isotopes are used in positron emission tomography, a technique used for medical imaging.

The short-lived positron emitting isotopes ^{11}C (T_{1/2} = 20.4 min), ^{13}N (T_{1/2} = 9.9 min), ^{15}O (T_{1/2} = 2.0 min), and ^{18}F (T_{1/2} = 109.8 min) used for positron emission tomography are typically produced by proton or deuteron irradiation of natural or enriched targets.
