= P-nuclei =

Set of isotopes in nuclear astrophysics

p-nuclei (p stands for proton-rich) are certain neutron-deficient, naturally occurring isotopes of some elements between selenium and mercury inclusive which cannot be produced in either the s- or the r-process.

== Definition ==
Part of the Chart of Nuclides showing some stable or nearly-stable s-, r-, and p-nuclei

The classical, ground-breaking works of Burbidge, Burbidge, Fowler and Hoyle (1957) and of A. G. W. Cameron (1957) showed how the majority of naturally occurring nuclides beyond the element iron can be made in two kinds of neutron capture processes, the s- and the r-process. Some neutron-deficient nuclides found in nature are not reached in these processes and therefore at least one additional process is required to synthesize them. These nuclei are called p-nuclei.

Since the definition of the p-nuclei depends on the current knowledge of the s- and r-process (see also nucleosynthesis), the original list of 35 p-nuclei may be modified over the years, as indicated in the Table below. For example, it is recognized today that the abundances of ^{152}Gd and ^{164}Er contain at least strong contributions from the s-process. This applies more weakly to those of ^{113}In and ^{114,115}Sn, and the first and last also by the r-process (as they can as fission products): the paths pass through metastable isomers, and may have been overlooked.

== Natural occurrence ==
The long-lived radionuclides ^{92}Nb, ^{97}Tc, ^{98}Tc, ^{146}Sm, ^{150}Gd, and ^{154}Dy are not among the classically defined p-nuclei as they no longer occur naturally on Earth. By the above definition, however, they are also p-nuclei because they cannot be made in either the s- or the r-process. From the discovery of their decay products in presolar grains it can be inferred that at least ^{92}Nb and ^{146}Sm were present in the solar nebula. This offers the possibility to estimate the time since the last production of these p-nuclei before the formation of the Solar System.

p-nuclei are very rare. Those isotopes of an element which are p-nuclei are less abundant typically by factors of ten to one thousand than the other isotopes of the same element. The abundances of p-nuclei can only be determined in geochemical investigations and by analysis of meteoritic material and presolar grains. They cannot be identified in stellar spectra. Therefore, the knowledge of p-abundances is restricted to those of the Solar System and it is unknown whether the solar abundances of p-nuclei are typical for the Milky Way.

== List of p-nuclei ==
Half-lives quoted below are copied from the linked isotope page. Possible s- and r-process paths are from references above.

Nuclide	Abundance	Comment
^{74}Se	0.86%	Stable nuclide
^{78}Kr	0.36%	long-lived radionuclide (half-life 9.2×10^{21} y)
^{84}Sr	0.56%	Stable nuclide
^{92}Nb	trace	long-lived radionuclide (half-life 3.47×10^{7} y); not a classical p-nucleus but cannot be made by s- or r-processes
^{92}Mo	14.65%	Stable nuclide
^{94}Mo	9.19%	Stable nuclide
^{97}Tc	syn	long-lived radionuclide (half-life 4.21×10^{6} y); not a classical p-nucleus but cannot be made by s- or r-processes
^{98}Tc	syn	long-lived radionuclide (half-life 4.2×10^{6} y); not a classical p-nucleus but cannot be made by s- or r-processes
^{96}Ru	5.54%	Stable nuclide
^{98}Ru	1.87%	Stable nuclide
^{102}Pd	1.02%	Stable nuclide
^{106}Cd	1.25%	Stable nuclide
^{108}Cd	0.89%	Stable nuclide
^{113}In	4.28%	Stable nuclide; can be made in the s- or r-processes through ^{113m}Cd
^{112}Sn	0.97%	Stable nuclide
^{114}Sn	0.66%	Stable nuclide; can be made in the s-process through ^{113}In
^{115}Sn	0.34%	Stable nuclide; can be made in the s- or r-processes through ^{115m}In
^{120}Te	0.09%	Stable nuclide
^{124}Xe	0.095%	long-lived radionuclide (half-life 1.1×10^{22} y)
^{126}Xe	0.089%	Stable nuclide
^{130}Ba	0.11%	long-lived radionuclide (half-life ~1×10^{21} y)
^{132}Ba	0.10%	Stable nuclide
^{138}La	0.089%	long-lived radionuclide (half-life 1.03×10^{11} y); made in the ν-process
^{136}Ce	0.186%	Stable nuclide
^{138}Ce	0.251%	Stable nuclide
^{144}Sm	3.08%	Stable nuclide
^{146}Sm	trace	long-lived radionuclide (half-life 9.20×10^{7} y); not a classical p-nucleus but cannot be made by s- or r-processes
^{150}Gd	syn	long-lived radionuclide (half-life 1.79×10^{6} y); not a classical p-nucleus but cannot be made by s- or r-processes
^{152}Gd	0.20%	long-lived radionuclide (half-life 1.08×10^{14} y); can be made in the s-process
^{154}Dy	syn	long-lived radionuclide (half-life 1.40×10^{6} y); not a classical p-nucleus but cannot be made by s- or r-processes
^{156}Dy	0.056%	Stable nuclide
^{158}Dy	0.095%	Stable nuclide
^{162}Er	0.139%	Stable nuclide
^{164}Er	1.601%	Stable nuclide; can be made in the s-process
^{168}Yb	0.126%	Stable nuclide
^{174}Hf	0.16%	long-lived radionuclide (half-life 3.8×10^{16} y)
^{180m}Ta	0.012%	Stable nuclide (the only stable nuclear isomer); (partially) made in the ν-process; possibly in the s-process?
^{180}W	0.12%	long-lived radionuclide (half-life 1.59×10^{18} y)
^{184}Os	0.02%	long-lived radionuclide (half-life 1.12×10^{13} y)
^{190}Pt	0.012%	long-lived radionuclide (half-life 4.83×10^{11} y)
^{196}Hg	0.15%	Stable nuclide

== Origin of the p-nuclei ==
The astrophysical production of p-nuclei is not completely understood yet. The favored γ-process (see below) in core-collapse supernovae cannot produce all p-nuclei in sufficient amounts, according to current computer simulations. This is why additional production mechanisms and astrophysical sites are under investigation, as outlined below. It is also conceivable that there is not just a single process responsible for all p-nuclei but that different processes in a number of astrophysical sites produce certain ranges of p-nuclei.

In the search for the relevant processes creating p-nuclei, the usual way is to identify the possible production mechanisms (processes) and then to investigate their possible realization in various astrophysical sites. The same logic is applied in the discussion below.

=== Basics of p-nuclide production ===
In principle, there are two ways to produce proton-rich nuclides: by successively adding protons to a nuclide (these are nuclear reactions of type (p,γ)) or by removing neutrons from a nucleus through sequences of photodisintegrations of type (γ,n).

Under conditions encountered in astrophysical environments it is difficult to obtain p-nuclei through proton captures because the Coulomb barrier of a nucleus increases with increasing proton number. A proton requires more energy to be captured by an atomic nucleus when the Coulomb barrier is higher. The available average energy of the protons is determined by the temperature of the stellar plasma. Increasing the temperature, however, also speeds up the (γ,p) photodisintegrations which counteract the (p,γ) captures. The only alternative avoiding this would be to have a very large number of protons available so that the effective number of captures per second is large even at low temperature. In extreme cases (as discussed below) this leads to the synthesis of extremely short-lived radionuclides which decay to stable nuclides only after the captures cease.

Appropriate combinations of temperature and proton density of a stellar plasma have to be explored in the search of possible production mechanisms for p-nuclei. Further parameters are the time available for the nuclear processes, and number and type of initially present nuclides (seed nuclei).

=== Possible processes ===
==== The p-process ====
In a p-process it is suggested that p-nuclei were made through a few proton captures on stable nuclides. The seed nuclei originate from the s- and r-process and are already present in the stellar plasma. As outlined above, there are serious difficulties explaining all p-nuclei through such a process although it was originally suggested to achieve exactly this. It was shown later that the required conditions are not reached in stars or stellar explosions.

Based on its historical meaning, the term p-process is sometimes used for any process synthesizing p-nuclei, even when no proton captures are involved, but this usage is discouraged.

==== The γ-process ====
p-nuclei can also be obtained by photodisintegration of s-process and r-process nuclei. At temperatures around 2–3 gigakelvins (GK) and short process time of a few seconds (this requires an explosive process) photodisintegration of the pre-existing nuclei will remain small, just enough to produce the required tiny abundances of p-nuclei. This is called the γ-process (gamma process) because the photodisintegration proceeds by nuclear reactions of the types (γ,n), (γ,α) and (γ,p), which are caused by highly energetic photons (gamma rays).

==== The ν-process (nu process) ====
If a sufficiently energetic source of neutrinos is available, as in core-collapse supernovae, nuclear reactions can occur with the neutrinos serving the same purpose as the photons in the γ-process, to cause disintegration of the nuclei by energy transfer. This is thought to contribute significantly to, for example, ^{7}Li, ^{11}B, ^{19}F, ^{138}La.

==== Rapid proton capture processes ====
In a p-process protons are added to stable or weakly radioactive atomic nuclei. If there is a high proton density in the stellar plasma, even short-lived radionuclides can capture one or more protons before they beta decay. This quickly moves the nucleosynthesis path from the region of stable nuclei to the very proton-rich side of the chart of nuclides. This is called rapid proton capture.

Here, a series of (p,γ) reactions proceeds until either the beta decay of a nucleus is faster than a further proton capture, or the proton drip line is reached. Both cases lead to one or several sequential beta decays until a nucleus is produced which again can capture protons before it beta decays. Then the proton capture sequences continue.

It is possible to cover the region of the lightest nuclei up to ^{56}Ni within a second because both proton captures and beta decays are fast. Starting with ^{56}Ni, however, a number of waiting points are encountered in the reaction path. These are nuclides which both have relatively long half-lives (compared to the process timescale) and can only slowly add another proton (that is, their cross section for (p,γ) reactions is small). The most important such waiting points are ^{64}Ge, ^{68}Se, ^{72}Kr, and further points depending on the detailed conditions and location of the reaction path. It is typical for such waiting points to show half-lives of tens of seconds. Thus, they considerably increase the time required to continue the reaction sequences. If the conditions required for this rapid proton capture are only present for a short time (the timescale of explosive astrophysical events is of the order of seconds), the waiting points limit or hamper the continuation of the reactions to heavier nuclei.

In order to produce p-nuclei, the process path has to encompass nuclides bearing the same mass number (but usually containing more protons) as the desired p-nuclei. These nuclides are then converted into p-nuclei through sequences of beta decays after the rapid proton captures ceased.

Variations of the main category rapid proton captures are the rp-, pn-, and νp-processes, which will be briefly outlined below.

===== The rp-process =====
The so-called rp-process (rp is for rapid proton capture) is the purest form of the rapid proton capture process described above. At proton densities of more than 10^{28} protons/cm^{3} and temperatures around 2×10^{9} K, the reaction path is close to the proton drip line. The waiting points can be bridged provided that the process time is 10–600 s. Waiting-point nuclides are produced with larger abundances while the production of nuclei "behind" each waiting point is increasingly suppressed.

The last waiting point reached is ^{104}Sn and the definitive endpoint is reached at ^{107}Te because of instability toward alpha decay, and primarily photon-induced decay or (γ,α) reactions loop the path back onto itself. Therefore, an rp-process would only be able to produce p-nuclei with mass numbers up to 106 or 107, or up to ^{106}Cd.

===== The pn-process =====
The waiting points in rapid proton capture processes can be avoided by (n,p) reactions which are much faster than proton captures on or beta decays of waiting points nuclei. This results in a considerable reduction of the time required to build heavy elements and allows an efficient production within seconds. This requires, however, a (small) supply of free neutrons which are usually not present in such proton-rich plasmas. One way to obtain them is to release them through other reactions occurring simultaneously as the rapid proton captures. This is called neutron-rich rapid proton capture or pn-process.

===== The νp-process =====
Another possibility to obtain the neutrons required for the accelerating (n,p) reactions in proton-rich environments is to use the anti-neutrino capture on protons (ν̅_{e} + p → e^{+} + n), turning a proton and an anti-neutrino into a positron and a neutron. Since (anti-)neutrinos interact only very weakly with protons, a high flux of anti-neutrinos has to act on a plasma with high proton density. This is called νp-process (nu p process).

=== Possible synthesis sites ===
==== Core-collapse supernovae ====
Massive stars end their life in a core-collapse supernova. In such a supernova, a shockfront from an explosion runs from the center of the star through its outer layers and ejects these. When the shockfront reaches the O/Ne-shell of the star (see also stellar evolution), the conditions for a 𝛾-process are reached for 1–2 s.

Although the majority of p-nuclei can be made in this way, some mass regions of p-nuclei turn out to be problematic in model calculations. It has been known already for decades that p-nuclei with mass numbers A < 100 cannot be produced in a 𝛾-process. Modern simulations also show problems in the range 150 ≤ A ≤ 165.

The p-nucleus ^{138}La is not produced in the 𝛾-process but it can be made in a ν-process. A hot neutron star is made in the center of such a core-collapse supernova and it radiates neutrinos with high intensity. The neutrinos interact also with the outer layers of the exploding star and cause nuclear reactions which create ^{138}La, among other nuclei. Also ^{180m}Ta may receive a contribution from this ν-process.

It was suggested to supplement the γ-process in the outer layers of the star by another process, occurring in the deepest layers of the star, close to the neutron star but still being ejected instead of falling onto the neutron star surface. Due to the initially high flow of neutrinos from the forming neutron star, these layers become extremely proton-rich through the reaction ν_{e} + n → e^{−} + p. Although the anti-neutrino flux is initially weaker a few neutrons will be created, nevertheless, because of the large number of protons. This allows a $\nu \mathrm p$-process in these deep layers. Because of the short timescale of the explosion and the high Coulomb barrier of the heavier nuclei, such a νp-process could possibly only produce the lightest p-nuclei. Which nuclei are made and how much of them depends sensitively on many details in the simulations and also on the actual explosion mechanism of a core-collapse supernova, which still is not completely understood.

==== Thermonuclear supernovae ====
A thermonuclear supernova is the explosion of a white dwarf in a binary star system, triggered by thermonuclear reactions in matter from a companion star accreted on the surface of the white dwarf. The accreted matter is rich in hydrogen (protons) and helium (α particles) and becomes hot enough to allow nuclear reactions.

A number of models for such explosions are discussed in literature, of which two were explored regarding the prospect of producing p-nuclei. None of these explosions release neutrinos, therefore rendering ν- and νp-process impossible. Conditions required for the rp-process are also not attained.

Details of the possible production of p-nuclei in such supernovae depend sensitively on the composition of the matter accreted from the companion star (the seed nuclei for all subsequent processes). Since this can change considerably from star to star, all statements and models of p-production in thermonuclear supernovae are prone to large uncertainties.

===== Type Ia supernovae =====
The consensus model of thermonuclear supernovae postulates that the white dwarf explodes after exceeding the Chandrasekhar limit by the accretion of matter because the contraction and heating ignites explosive carbon burning under degenerate conditions. A nuclear burning front runs through the white dwarf from the inside out and tears it apart. Then the outermost layers closely beneath the surface of the white dwarf (containing 0.05 solar masses of matter) exhibit the right conditions for a γ-process.

The p-nuclei are made in the same way as in the γ-process in core-collapse supernovae and also the same difficulties are encountered. In addition, ^{138}La and ^{180m}Ta are not produced. A variation of the seed abundances by assuming increased s-process abundances only scales the abundances of the resulting p-nuclei without curing the problems of relative underproduction in the nuclear mass ranges given above.

===== subChandrasekhar supernovae =====
In a subclass of type Ia supernovae, the so-called subChandrasekhar supernova, the white dwarf may explode long before it reaches the Chandrasekhar limit because nuclear reactions in the accreted matter can already heat the white dwarf during its accretion phase and trigger explosive carbon burning prematurely. Helium-rich accretion favors this type of explosion. Helium burning ignites degeneratively on the bottom of the accreted helium layer and causes two shockfronts. The one running inwards ignites the carbon explosion. The outwards moving front heats the outer layers of the white dwarf and ejects them. Again, these outer layers are site to a γ-process at temperatures of 2–3 GK. Due to the presence of α particles (helium nuclei), however, additional nuclear reactions become possible. Among those are such which release a large number of neutrons, such as ^{18}O(α,n)^{21}Ne, ^{22}Ne(α,n)^{25}Mg, and ^{26}Mg(α,n)^{29}Si. This allows a pn-process in that part of the outer layers which experiences temperatures above 3 GK.

Those light p-nuclei which are underproduced in the γ-process can be so efficiently made in the pn-process that they even show much larger abundances than the other p-nuclei. To obtain the observed solar relative abundances, a strongly enhanced s-process seed (by factors of 100–1000 or more) has to be assumed which increases the yield of heavy p-nuclei from the γ-process.

==== Neutron stars in binary star systems ====
A neutron star in a binary star system can also accrete matter from the companion star on its surface. Combined hydrogen and helium burning ignites when the accreted layer of degenerate matter reaches a density of 10^{5}–10^{6} g/cm^{3} and a temperature exceeding 0.2 GK. This leads to thermonuclear burning comparable to what happens in the outwards moving shockfront of subChandrasekhar supernovae. The neutron star itself is not affected by the explosion and therefore the nuclear reactions in the accreted layer can proceed longer than in an explosion. This allows to establish an rp-process. It will continue until either all free protons are used up or the burning layer has expanded due to the increase in temperature and its density falls below the one required for the nuclear reactions.

It was shown that the properties of X-ray bursts in the Milky Way can be explained by an rp-process on the surface of accreting neutron stars. It remains unclear, yet, whether matter (and if, how much matter) can be ejected and escape the gravitational field of the neutron star. Only if this is the case can such objects be considered as possible sources of p-nuclei. Even if this is corroborated, the demonstrated endpoint of the rp-process limits the production to the light p-nuclei (which are underproduced in core-collapse supernovae).

== See also ==
- List of unsolved problems in physics
