= Isotopes of holmium =

Isotopes of holmium (_{67}Ho)
Main isotopes			Decay	
Isotope	abundance	half-life (t_{1/2})	mode	product
^{163}Ho	synth	4570 y	ε	^{163}Dy
^{164}Ho	synth	28.8 min	ε	^{164}Dy
^{164}Ho	synth	28.8 min	β^{−}	^{164}Er
^{165}Ho	100%	stable		
^{166}Ho	synth	26.812 h	β^{−}	^{166}Er
^{166m1}Ho	synth	1133 y	β^{−}	^{166}Er
^{167}Ho	synth	3.1 h	β^{−}	^{167}Er

Standard atomic weight A_{r}°(Ho)
- 164.930329±0.000005; 164.93±0.01 (abridged)

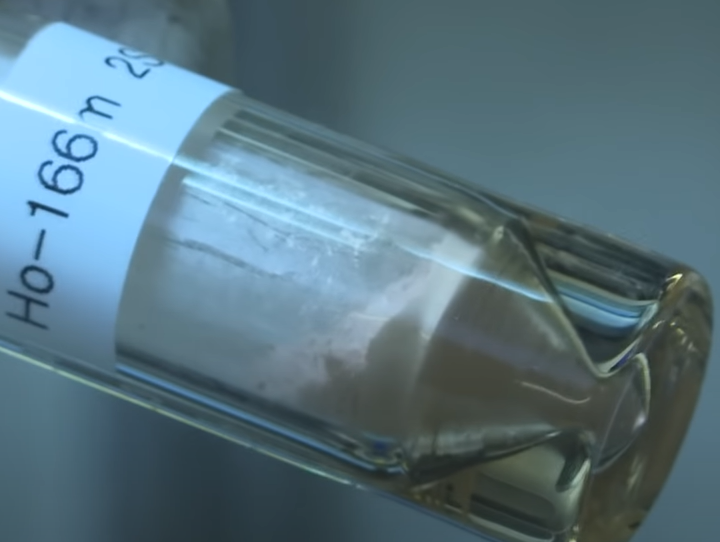
Holmium-166m1 oxide

Natural holmium (_{67}Ho) contains one observationally stable isotope, ^{165}Ho. The known isotopes of holmium range from ^{140}Ho to ^{175}Ho. The primary decay mode before the stable ^{165}Ho, is beta plus decay to dysprosium isotopes, and the primary mode after is beta minus decay to erbium isotopes.

Among the synthetic radioactive isotopes the most stable is ^{163}Ho with a half-life of 4,570 years, the next most stable is ^{166}Ho having a half-life of 26.812 hours, and others are under 4 hours. The isomeric nuclide ^{166m1}Ho, however, has a half-life of 1,133 years, much the longest of the meta states.

Holmium-166 (ground state) has been studied for medical application.

== List of isotopes ==
Nuclide (Note: ^{m}Ho – Excited nuclear isomer.)	Z	N	Isotopic mass (Da) (Note: ( ) – Uncertainty (1σ) is given in concise form in parentheses after the corresponding last digits.) (Note: # – Atomic mass marked #: value and uncertainty derived not from purely experimental data, but at least partly from trends from the Mass Surface (TMS).)	Discovery year	Half-life (Note: # – Values marked # are not purely derived from experimental data, but at least partly from trends of neighboring nuclides (TNN).)	Decay mode (Note: Modes of decay: EC: / Electron capture; IT: / Isomeric transition)	Daughter isotope (Note: Bold symbol as daughter – Daughter product is stable.)	Spin and parity (Note: ( ) spin value – Indicates spin with weak assignment arguments.)	Isotopic abundance
Nuclide	Excitation energy			Discovery year	Half-life	Decay mode	Daughter isotope	Spin and parity	Isotopic abundance
^{140}Ho	67	73	139.96853(54)#	1999	6(3) ms	p	^{139}Dy	8+#	
^{141}Ho	67	74	140.96311(43)#	1998	4.1(1) ms	p	^{140}Dy	(7/2−)	
^{141m}Ho	66(2) keV			1998	7.3(3) μs	p	^{140}Dy	(1/2+)	
^{142}Ho	67	75	141.96001(43)#	2001	400(100) ms	β^{+}	^{142}Dy	(7−, 8+)	
^{142}Ho	67	75	141.96001(43)#	2001	400(100) ms	β^{+}, p (?%)	^{141}Tb	(7−, 8+)	
^{142}Ho	67	75	141.96001(43)#	2001	400(100) ms	p (?%)	^{141}Dy	(7−, 8+)	
^{143}Ho	67	76	142.95486(32)#	2026	300# ms [>310 ns]			11/2−#	
^{144}Ho	67	77	143.9521097(91)	1986	0.7(1) s	β^{+}	^{144}Dy	(5−)	
^{144}Ho	67	77	143.9521097(91)	1986	0.7(1) s	β^{+}, p (?%)	^{143}Tb	(5−)	
^{144m}Ho	265.3(3) keV			2001	519(5) ns	IT	^{144}Ho	(8+)	
^{145}Ho	67	78	144.9472674(80)	1987	2.4(1) s	β^{+}	^{145}Dy	(11/2−)	
^{146}Ho	67	79	145.9449935(71)	1982	3.32(22) s	β^{+}	^{146}Dy	(6−)	
^{146}Ho	67	79	145.9449935(71)	1982	3.32(22) s	β^{+}, p (?%)	^{145}Tb	(6−)	
^{147}Ho	67	80	146.9401423(54)	1982	5.8(4) s	β^{+}	^{147}Dy	(11/2−)	
^{147m}Ho	2687.1(4) keV			1982	315(30) ns	IT	^{147}Ho	(27/2−)	
^{148}Ho	67	81	147.937744(90)	1979	2.2(11) s	β^{+}	^{148}Dy	(1+)	
^{148m1}Ho	250(100)# keV			1982	9.49(12) s	β^{+} (99.92%)	^{148}Dy	(5−)	
^{148m1}Ho	250(100)# keV			1982	9.49(12) s	β^{+}, p (0.08%)	^{147}Tb	(5−)	
^{148m2}Ho	940(100)# keV			1984	2.36(6) ms	IT	^{148m1}Ho	(10)+	
^{149}Ho	67	82	148.933820(13)	1979	21.1(2) s	β^{+}	^{149}Dy	(11/2−)	
^{149m}Ho	48.80(20) keV			1989	56(3) s	β^{+}	^{149}Dy	(1/2+)	
^{150}Ho	67	83	149.933498(15)	1963	76.8(18) s	β^{+}	^{150}Dy	(2)−	
^{150m1}Ho (Note: Order of ground state and isomer is uncertain.)	0(50) keV			1980	23.3(3) s	β^{+}	^{150}Dy	(9)+	
^{150m2}Ho	7900(50) keV			1981	787(36) ns	IT	^{150}Ho	(28−)	
^{151}Ho	67	84	150.9316982(89)	1963	35.2(1) s	β^{+} (78%)	^{151}Dy	11/2−	
^{151}Ho	67	84	150.9316982(89)	1963	35.2(1) s	α (22%)	^{147}Tb	11/2−	
^{151m}Ho	41.0(2) keV			1963	47.2(13) s	α (77%)	^{147}Tb	1/2+	
^{151m}Ho	41.0(2) keV			1963	47.2(13) s	β^{+} (23%)	^{151}Dy	1/2+	
^{152}Ho	67	85	151.931718(13)	1963	161.8(3) s	β^{+} (88%)	^{152}Dy	2−	
^{152}Ho	67	85	151.931718(13)	1963	161.8(3) s	α (12%)	^{148}Tb	2−	
^{152m1}Ho	160(3) keV			1963	49.8(2) s	β^{+} (89.2%)	^{152}Dy	9+	
^{152m1}Ho	160(3) keV			1963	49.8(2) s	α (10.8%)	^{148}Tb	9+	
^{152m2}Ho	3019.59(19) keV			1994	8.4(3) μs	IT	^{152}Ho	19−	
^{153}Ho	67	86	152.9302067(54)	1963	2.01(3) min	β^{+} (99.95%)	^{153}Dy	11/2−	
^{153}Ho	67	86	152.9302067(54)	1963	2.01(3) min	α (0.051%)	^{149}Tb	11/2−	
^{153m1}Ho	68.7(3) keV			1971	9.3(5) min	β^{+} (99.82%)	^{153}Dy	1/2+	
^{153m1}Ho	68.7(3) keV			1971	9.3(5) min	α (0.18%)	^{149}Tb	1/2+	
^{153m2}Ho	2772.3(14) keV			1980	229(2) ns	IT	^{153}Ho	31/2+	
^{154}Ho	67	87	153.9306068(88)	1966	11.76(19) min	β^{+} (99.98%)	^{154}Dy	2−	
^{154}Ho	67	87	153.9306068(88)	1966	11.76(19) min	α (0.019%)	^{150}Tb	2−	
^{154m}Ho	243(28) keV			1968	3.10(14) min	β^{+}	^{154}Dy	8+	
^{154m}Ho	243(28) keV			1968	3.10(14) min	α (<0.001%)	^{150}Tb	8+	
^{154m}Ho	243(28) keV			1968	3.10(14) min	IT (rare)	^{154}Ho	8+	
^{155}Ho	67	88	154.929103(19)	1959	48(2) min	β^{+}	^{155}Dy	5/2+	
^{155m}Ho	141.87(11) keV			1979	880(80) μs	IT	^{155}Ho	11/2−	
^{156}Ho	67	89	155.929642(41)	1957	56(1) min	β^{+}	^{156}Dy	4−	
^{156m1}Ho	52.37(30) keV			(1995) (Note: Only published in a conference proceeding and not a refereed journal.)	9.5(15) s	IT	^{156}Ho	1−	
^{156m2}Ho	230(50) keV			(1999)	7.6(3) min	β^{+} (75%)	^{156}Dy	9+	
^{156m2}Ho	230(50) keV			(1999)	7.6(3) min	IT (25%)	^{156}Ho	9+	
^{157}Ho	67	90	156.928252(25)	1965	12.6(2) min	β^{+}	^{157}Dy	7/2−	
^{158}Ho	67	91	157.928945(29)	1960	11.3(4) min	β^{+}	^{158}Dy	5+	
^{158m1}Ho	67.20(1) keV			1962	28(2) min	IT (91%)	^{158}Ho	2−	
^{158m1}Ho	67.20(1) keV			1962	28(2) min	β^{+} (9%)	^{158}Dy	2−	
^{158m2}Ho	91.595(12) keV			(2005)	140(25) ns	IT	^{158}Ho	(2−)	
^{158m3}Ho	180(70)# keV			1974	21.3(23) min	β^{+}	^{158}Dy	(9+)	
^{159}Ho	67	92	158.9277187(33)	1958	33.05(11) min	β^{+}	^{159}Dy	7/2−	
^{159m}Ho	205.91(5) keV			1965	8.30(8) s	IT	^{159}Ho	1/2+	
^{160}Ho	67	93	159.928736(16)	1950	25.6(3) min	β^{+}	^{160}Dy	5+	
^{160m1}Ho	59.98(3) keV			1955	5.02(5) h	IT (73%)	^{160}Ho	2−	
^{160m1}Ho	59.98(3) keV			1955	5.02(5) h	β^{+} (27%)	^{160}Dy	2−	
^{160m2}Ho	197(16) keV			1988	~3 s	IT	^{160}Ho	(9+)	
^{161}Ho	67	94	160.9278618(23)	1954	2.48(5) h	EC	^{161}Dy	7/2−	
^{161m}Ho	211.15(3) keV			1965	6.76(7) s	IT	^{161}Ho	1/2+	
^{162}Ho	67	95	161.9291025(33)	1957	15.0(10) min	β^{+}	^{162}Dy	1+	
^{162m}Ho	105.87(6) keV			1961	67.0(7) min	IT (62%)	^{162}Ho	6−	
^{162m}Ho	105.87(6) keV			1961	67.0(7) min	β^{+} (38%)	^{162}Dy	6−	
^{163}Ho	67	96	162.92874026(74)	1957	4570(25) y	EC	^{163}Dy	7/2−	
^{163m1}Ho	297.88(7) keV			1957	1.09(3) s	IT	^{163}Ho	1/2+	
^{163m2}Ho	2109.4(4) keV			2012	800(150) ns	IT	^{163}Ho	(23/2+)	
^{164}Ho	67	97	163.9302405(15)	1938	28.8(5) min	EC (61%)	^{164}Dy	1+	
^{164}Ho	67	97	163.9302405(15)	1938	28.8(5) min	β^{−} (39%)	^{164}Er	1+	
^{164m}Ho	139.78(7) keV			1966	36.6(3) min	IT	^{164}Ho	6−	
^{165}Ho	67	98	164.93032912(84)	1934	Observationally Stable (Note: Believed to undergo α decay to ^{161}Tb)			7/2−	1.0000
^{165m1}Ho	361.675(11) keV			1959	1.512(4) μs	IT	^{165}Ho	3/2+	
^{165m2}Ho	715.33(2) keV			(1958) (Note: Half-life less than 100 ns, not included in the discovery database.)	<100 ns	IT	^{165}Ho	7/2+	
^{166}Ho	67	99	165.93229121(84)	1936	26.812(7) h	β^{−}	^{166}Er	0−	
^{166m1}Ho	5.969(12) keV			1952	1132.6(39) y	β^{−}	^{166}Er	7−	
^{166m2}Ho	190.9021(20) keV			1960	185(15) μs	IT	^{166}Ho	3+	
^{167}Ho	67	100	166.9331403(56)	1955	3.1(1) h	β^{−}	^{167}Er	7/2−	
^{167m}Ho	259.34(11) keV			1977	6.0(10) μs	IT	^{167}Ho	3/2+	
^{168}Ho	67	101	167.935524(32)	1960	2.99(7) min	β^{−}	^{168}Er	3+	
^{168m1}Ho	59(1) keV			1990	132(4) s	IT	^{168}Ho	(6+)	
^{168m2}Ho	143.43(17) keV			1990	>4 μs	IT	^{168}Ho	(1)−	
^{168m3}Ho	192.57(20) keV			1990	108(11) ns	IT	^{168}Ho	1+	
^{169}Ho	67	102	168.936880(22)	1963	4.72(10) min	β^{−}	^{169}Er	7/2−	
^{169m}Ho	1386.2(4) keV			2010	118(6) μs	IT	^{169}Ho	(19/2+)	
^{170}Ho	67	103	169.939627(54)	1960	2.76(5) min	β^{−}	^{170}Er	(6+)	
^{170m}Ho	100(80) keV			1969	43(2) s	β^{−}	^{170}Er	(1+)	
^{171}Ho	67	104	170.94147(64)	1989	53(2) s	β^{−}	^{171}Er	7/2−#	
^{172}Ho	67	105	171.94473(21)#	1991	25(3) s	β^{−}	^{172}Er	0+#	
^{173}Ho	67	106	172.94702(32)#	2012	7.1(4) s	β^{−}	^{173}Er	7/2−#	
^{173m}Ho	405(1) keV			2020	3.7(12) μs	IT	^{173}Ho	1/2+#	
^{174}Ho	67	107	173.95076(32)#	2012	3.7(4) s	β^{−}	^{174}Er	(8−)	
^{175}Ho	67	108	174.95352(43)#	2012	1.88(55) s	β^{−}	^{175}Er	7/2−#	
^{176}Ho	67	109	175.95771(54)#	2012	1# s [>300 ns]			4+#	
^{177}Ho	67	110	176.96105(54)#	2018	1# s [>550 ns]	β^{−}	^{177}Er	7/2−#	
^{178}Ho	67	111	177.96551(54)#	2018	750# ms [>550 ns]			2+#	
^{179}Ho	67	112		2026					
This table header & footer:

== See also ==
Daughter products other than holmium

- Isotopes of erbium
- Isotopes of dysprosium
- Isotopes of terbium
