= Fission product yield =

Concept in nuclear physics

In nuclear physics, fission product yield refers to the fraction of a fission product produced per fission. Nuclear fission splits a heavy nucleus such as uranium or plutonium into two lighter nuclei, which are called fission products.

Yield can be broken down by:

1. Individual isotope
2. Chemical element spanning several isotopes of different mass number but same atomic number.
3. Nuclei of a given mass number regardless of atomic number. Known as "chain yield" because it represents a decay chain of beta decay.

Isotope and element yields will change as the fission products undergo beta decay. In contrast, chain yields do not change after completion of neutron emission by a few neutron-rich initial fission products (delayed neutrons), with half-life measured in seconds.

A few isotopes can be produced directly by fission, but not by beta decay because the would-be precursor with atomic number one less is stable and does not decay (atomic number grows by one during beta decay). Chain yields do not account for these "shadowed" isotopes; however, they have very low yields (less than a millionth as much as common fission products) because they are far less neutron-rich than the original heavy nuclei.

Yield is usually stated as percentage per fission, so that the total yield percentages sum to 200%. Less often, it is stated as percentage of all fission products, so that the percentages sum to 100%. Ternary fission, about 0.2–0.4% of fissions, also produces a third light nucleus such as helium-4 (90%) or tritium (7%).

== Definitions ==
There are several types of yields. For the most common fission reactions, the decay of the fission products preserve mass number. Thus the products form decay chains of constant mass. That makes the independent yield especially useful.

The independent yield is a product of three factors, Y(A) the sum yield or mass yield, $f(A,Z)$ the fractional independent yield, and R(A,Z,I) the isomeric yield ratio:
$$\textrm{y}(A,Z,I) = \textrm{Y}(A)\cdot f(A,Z) \cdot R(A,Z,I)$$
Here possible product of fission can be represented by a triplet (A,Z,I), where A is the mass number, Z is the atomic number, and I is an integer for isomeric excited state, numbered from 0 for the ground state. For each decay chain (mass number A) the fractional independent yields and isomeric yield formulas sum to one:
$$\Sigma_Z f(A,Z) = \Sigma_I R(A,Z,I) = 1$$
and the independent yields sum to the sum yield for each chain:
$$\textrm{Y}(A) = \Sigma_{Z,I} \textrm{y}(A,Z,I).$$
The independent yield excludes delayed neutron emission. The cumulative yield,, c(A,Z,I), of a nuclide (A,Z,I) is the total number of atoms produced by one fission over all time. The chain yield, Ch(A), is the sum of all the cumulative yields for one mass chain for one fission. The independent, cumulative, and chain yields are given as percent per fission, that is as the yield of products per 100 fission reaction.

== Examples ==
The main fission products can be distinguished based on their lifetime: medium- or long-lived fission products, as presented in the two tables below.

Long-lived fission products
Nuclide	t_{1/2}	Yield	Q (Note: Decay energy is split among β, neutrino, and γ if any.)	βγ
	(Ma)	(%) (Note: Per 65 thermal neutron fissions of ^{235}U and 35 of ^{239}Pu.)	(keV)	
^{99}Tc	0.211	6.1385	294	β
^{126}Sn	0.23	0.1084	4050 (Note: Has decay energy 380 keV, but its decay product ^{126}Sb has decay energy 3.67 MeV.)	βγ
^{79}Se	0.33	0.0447	151	β
^{135}Cs	1.33	6.9110 (Note: Lower in thermal reactors because ^{135}Xe, its predecessor, readily absorbs neutrons.)	269	β
^{93}Zr	1.61	5.4575	91	βγ
^{107}Pd	6.5	1.2499	33	β
^{129}I	16.1	0.8410	194	βγ

Medium-lived fission products
Nuclide	t_{1/2}	Yield	Q (Note: Decay energy is split among β, neutrino, and γ if any.)	βγ
	(a)	(%) (Note: Per 65 thermal neutron fissions of ^{235}U and 35 of ^{239}Pu.)	(keV)	
^{155}Eu	4.74	0.0803 (Note: Neutron poison; in thermal reactors, most is destroyed by further neutron capture.)	252	βγ
^{85}Kr	10.73	0.2180 (Note: Less than 1/4 of mass-85 fission products as most bypass ground state: ^{85}Br → ^{85m}Kr → ^{85}Rb.)	687	βγ
^{113m}Cd	13.9	0.0008	316	β
^{90}Sr	28.91	4.505	2826 (Note: Has decay energy 546 keV; its decay product ^{90}Y has decay energy 2.28 MeV with weak gamma branching.)	β
^{137}Cs	30.04	6.337	1176	βγ
^{121m}Sn	43.9	0.00005	390	βγ
^{151}Sm	94.6	0.5314	77	β

== Mass vs. yield curve ==
Fission product yields by mass for thermal neutron fission of U-235, Pu-239, a combination of the two typical of current nuclear power reactors, and U-233 used in the thorium fuel cycle

If a graph of the mass or mole yield of fission products against the atomic number of the fragments is drawn then it has two peaks, one in the area zirconium through to palladium and one at xenon through to neodymium. This is because the fission event causes the nucleus to split in an asymmetric manner, as nuclei closer to magic numbers are more stable.

Yield vs. Z - This is a typical distribution for the fission of uranium. Note that in the calculations used to make this graph the activation of fission products was ignored and the fission was assumed to occur in a single moment rather than a length of time. In this bar chart results are shown for different cooling times (time after fission).

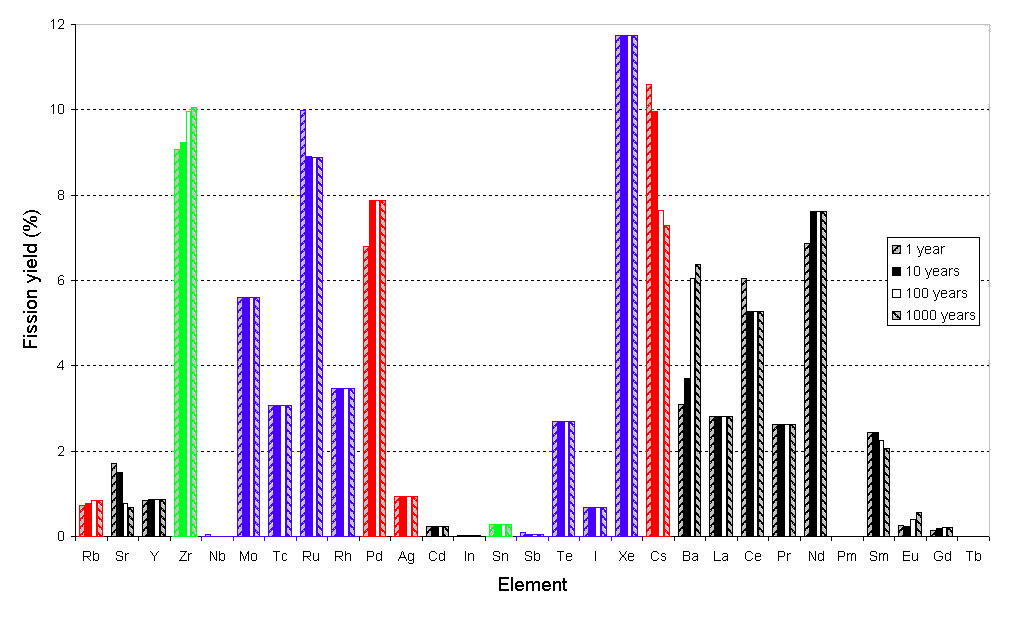
Yield vs Z. Colors indicate fluoride volatility, which is important in nuclear reprocessing: Blue elements have volatile fluorides or are already volatile; green elements do not but have volatile chlorides; red elements have neither, but the elements themselves are volatile at very high temperatures. Yields at 10^{0,1,2,3} years after fission, not considering later neutron capture, fraction of 100% not 200%. Beta decay Kr-85→Rb, Sr-90→Zr, Ru-106→Pd, Sb-125→Te, Cs-137→Ba, Ce-144→Nd, Sm-151→Eu, Eu-155→Gd visible.

Because of the stability of nuclei with even numbers of protons and/or neutrons the curve of yield against element is not a smooth curve. It tends to alternate.

In general, the higher the energy of the state that undergoes nuclear fission, the more likely a symmetric fission is, hence as the neutron energy increases and/or the energy of the fissile atom increases, the valley between the two peaks becomes more shallow; for instance, the curve of yield against mass for Pu-239 has a more shallow valley than that observed for U-235, when the neutrons are thermal neutrons. The curves for the fission of the later actinides tend to make even more shallow valleys. In extreme cases such as ^{259}Fm, only one peak is seen.

Yield is usually expressed relative to number of fissioning nuclei, not the number of fission product nuclei, that is, yields should sum to 200%.

The table in the next section ("Ordered by yield") gives yields for notable radioactive (with half-lives greater than one year, plus iodine-131) fission products, and (the few most absorptive) neutron poison fission products, from thermal neutron fission of U-235 (typical of nuclear power reactors), computed from.

The yields in the table sum to only 45.5522%, including 34.8401% which have half-lives greater than one year:

t_{½} in years	Yield
1 to 5	2.7252%
10 to 100	12.5340%
200,000 to 300,000	6.1251%
1.5 to 16 million	13.4494%

The remainder and the unlisted 54.4478% decay with half-lives less than one year into nonradioactive nuclei.

This is before accounting for the effects of any subsequent neutron capture; e.g.:

- ^{135}Xe capturing a neutron and becoming nearly stable ^{136}Xe, rather than decaying to ^{135}Cs which is radioactive with a half-life of 2.3 million years
- Nonradioactive ^{133}Cs capturing a neutron and becoming ^{134}Cs, which is radioactive with a half-life of 2 years
- Many of the fission products with mass 147 or greater such as ^{147}Pm, ^{149}Sm, ^{151}Sm, and ^{155}Eu have significant cross sections for neutron capture, so that one heavy fission product atom can undergo multiple successive neutron captures.

Besides fission products, the other types of radioactive products are

- plutonium containing ^{238}Pu, ^{239}Pu, ^{240}Pu, ^{241}Pu, and ^{242}Pu,
- minor actinides including ^{237}Np, ^{241}Am, ^{243}Am, curium isotopes, and perhaps californium
- reprocessed uranium containing ^{236}U and other isotopes
- tritium, mostly from ternary fission or as an activation product in heavy water reactors
- activation products of neutron capture by the reactor or bomb structure or the environment
- Helium-4 from alpha decay

== Fission products from U-235 ==
Yield	Element	Isotope	Halflife	Comment
6.7896%	Caesium	^{133}Cs → ^{134}Cs	2.065 y	Neutron capture (29 barns) slowly converts stable ^{133}Cs to ^{134}Cs, which itself is low-yield because beta decay stops at ^{134}Xe; can be further converted (140 barns) to ^{135}Cs.
6.3333%	Iodine, xenon	^{135}I → ^{135}Xe	6.57 h	Most important neutron poison; neutron capture converts 10–50% of ^{135}Xe to ^{136}Xe; remainder decays (9.14h) to ^{135}Cs (2.3 My).
6.2956%	Zirconium	^{93}Zr	1.53 My	Long-lived fission product also produced by neutron activation in zircalloy cladding.
6.1%	Molybdenum	^{99}Mo	65.94 h	Its daughter nuclide ^{99m}Tc is important in medical diagnosing.
6.0899%	Caesium	^{137}Cs	30.17 y	Source of most of the decay heat from years to decades after irradiation, together with ^{90}Sr.
6.0507%	Technetium	^{99}Tc	211 ky	Candidate for disposal by nuclear transmutation.
5.7518%	Strontium	^{90}Sr	28.9 y	Source of much of the decay heat together with ^{137}Cs on the timespan of years to decades after irradiation. Formerly used in radioisotope thermoelectric generators.
2.8336%	Iodine	^{131}I	8.02 d	Reason for the use of potassium iodide tablets after nuclear accidents or nuclear bomb explosions.
2.2713%	Promethium	^{147}Pm	2.62 y	beta decays to very long lived Samarium-147 (half-life>age of the universe); has seen some use in radioisotope thermoelectric generators
1.0888%	Samarium	^{149}Sm	Observationally stable	2nd most significant neutron poison.
0.9%	Iodine	^{129}I	15.7 My	Long-lived fission product. Candidate for disposal by nuclear transmutation.
0.4203%	Samarium	^{151}Sm	90 y	Neutron poison; most will be converted to stable ^{152}Sm.
0.3912%	Ruthenium	^{106}Ru	373.6 d	ruthenium tetroxide is volatile and chemically aggressive; daughter nuclide ^{106}Rh decays quickly to stable ^{106}Pd
0.2717%	Krypton	^{85}Kr	10.78 y	noble gas; has some uses in industry to detect fine cracks in materials via autoradiography
0.1629%	Palladium	^{107}Pd	6.5 My	Long-lived fission product; hampers extraction of stable isotopes of platinum group metals for use due to chemical similarity.
0.0508%	Selenium	^{79}Se	327 ky	
0.0330%	Europium, gadolinium	^{155}Eu → ^{155}Gd	4.76 y	Both neutron poisons, most will be destroyed while fuel still in use.
0.0297%	Antimony	^{125}Sb	2.76 y	
0.0236%	Tin	^{126}Sn	230 ky	
0.0065%	Gadolinium	^{157}Gd	stable	Neutron poison.
0.0003%	Cadmium	^{113m}Cd	14.1 y	Neutron poison, most will be destroyed while fuel still in use.

== Cumulative fission yields ==
Cumulative fission yields give the amounts of nuclides produced either directly in the fission or by decay of other nuclides.

Cumulative fission yields per fission for U-235 (%)
Product	Thermal fission yield	Fast fission yield	14-MeV fission yield
^{1}_{1}H	0.00171 ± 0.00018	0.00269 ± 0.00044	0.00264 ± 0.00045
^{2}_{1}H	0.00084 ± 0.00015	0.00082 ± 0.00012	0.00081 ± 0.00012
^{3}_{1}H	0.0108 ± 0.0004	0.0108 ± 0.0004	0.0174 ± 0.0036
^{3}_{2}He	0.0108 ± 0.0004	0.0108 ± 0.0004	0.0174 ± 0.0036
^{4}_{2}He	0.1702 ± 0.0049	0.17 ± 0.0049	0.1667 ± 0.0088
^{85}_{35}Br	1.304 ± 0.012	1.309 ± 0.043	1.64 ± 0.31
^{82}_{36}Kr	0.000285 ± 0.000076	0.00044 ± 0.00016	0.038 ± 0.012
^{85}_{36}Kr	0.286 ± 0.021	0.286 ± 0.026	0.47 ± 0.1
^{85m}_{36}Kr	1.303 ± 0.012	1.307 ± 0.043	1.65 ± 0.31
^{90}_{38}Sr	5.73 ± 0.13	5.22 ± 0.18	4.41 ± 0.18
^{95}_{40}Zr	6.502 ± 0.072	6.349 ± 0.083	5.07 ± 0.19
^{94}_{41}Nb	0.00000042 ± 0.00000011	2.90±0.770 × 10^{−8}	0.00004 ± 0.000015
^{95}_{41}Nb	6.498 ± 0.072	6.345 ± 0.083	5.07 ± 0.19
^{95m}_{41}Nb	0.0702 ± 0.0067	0.0686 ± 0.0071	0.0548 ± 0.0072
^{92}_{42}Mo	0 ± 0	0 ± 0	0 ± 0
^{94}_{42}Mo	8.70 × 10^{−10} ± 3.20 × 10^{−10}	0 ± 0	6.20 × 10^{−8} ± 2.50 × 10^{−8}
^{96}_{42}Mo	0.00042 ± 0.00015	0.000069 ± 0.000025	0.0033 ± 0.0015
^{99}_{42}Mo	6.132 ± 0.092	5.8 ± 0.13	5.02 ± 0.13
^{99}_{43}Tc	6.132 ± 0.092	5.8 ± 0.13	5.02 ± 0.13
^{103}_{44}Ru	3.103 ± 0.084	3.248 ± 0.042	3.14 ± 0.11
^{106}_{44}Ru	0.41 ± 0.011	0.469 ± 0.036	2.15 ± 0.59
^{106}_{45}Rh	0.41 ± 0.011	0.469 ± 0.036	2.15 ± 0.59
^{121m}_{50}Sn	0.00106 ± 0.00011	0.0039 ± 0.00091	0.142 ± 0.023
^{122}_{51}Sb	0.000000366 ± 0.000000098	0.0000004 ± 0.00000014	0.00193 ± 0.00068
^{124}_{51}Sb	0.000089 ± 0.000021	0.000112 ± 0.000034	0.027 ± 0.01
^{125}_{51}Sb	0.026 ± 0.0014	0.067 ± 0.011	1.42 ± 0.42
^{132}_{52}Te	4.276 ± 0.043	4.639 ± 0.065	3.85 ± 0.16
^{129}_{53}I	0.706 ± 0.032	1.03 ± 0.26	1.59 ± 0.18
^{131}_{53}I	2.878 ± 0.032	3.365 ± 0.054	4.11 ± 0.14
^{133}_{53}I	6.59 ± 0.11	6.61 ± 0.13	5.42 ± 0.4
^{135}_{53}I	6.39 ± 0.22	6.01 ± 0.18	4.8 ± 1.4
^{128}_{54}Xe	0 ± 0	0 ± 0	0.00108 ± 0.00048
^{130}_{54}Xe	0.000038 ± 0.0000098	0.000152 ± 0.000055	0.038 ± 0.014
^{131m}_{54}Xe	0.0313 ± 0.003	0.0365 ± 0.0031	0.047 ± 0.0049
^{133}_{54}Xe	6.6 ± 0.11	6.61 ± 0.13	5.57 ± 0.41
^{133m}_{54}Xe	0.189 ± 0.015	0.19 ± 0.015	0.281 ± 0.049
^{135}_{54}Xe	6.61 ± 0.22	6.32 ± 0.18	6.4 ± 1.8
^{135m}_{54}Xe	1.22 ± 0.12	1.23 ± 0.13	2.17 ± 0.66
^{134}_{55}Cs	0.0000121 ± 0.0000032	0.0000279 ± 0.0000073	0.0132 ± 0.0035
^{137}_{55}Cs	6.221 ± 0.069	5.889 ± 0.096	5.6 ± 1.3
^{140}_{56}Ba	6.314 ± 0.095	5.959 ± 0.048	4.474 ± 0.081
^{140}_{57}La	6.315 ± 0.095	5.96 ± 0.048	4.508 ± 0.081
^{141}_{58}Ce	5.86 ± 0.15	5.795 ± 0.081	4.44 ± 0.2
^{144}_{58}Ce	5.474 ± 0.055	5.094 ± 0.076	3.154 ± 0.038
^{144}_{59}Pr	5.474 ± 0.055	5.094 ± 0.076	3.155 ± 0.038
^{142}_{60}Nd	6.30 × 10^{−9} ± 1.70 × 10^{−9}	1.70 × 10^{−9} ± 4.80 × 10^{−10}	0.0000137 ± 0.0000049
^{144}_{60}Nd	5.475 ± 0.055	5.094 ± 0.076	3.155 ± 0.038
^{147}_{60}Nd	2.232 ± 0.04	2.148 ± 0.028	1.657 ± 0.045
^{147}_{61}Pm	2.232 ± 0.04	2.148 ± 0.028	1.657 ± 0.045
^{148}_{61}Pm	5.00 × 10^{−8} ± 1.70 × 10^{−8}	7.40 × 10^{−9} ± 2.50 × 10^{−9}	0.0000013 ± 0.00000042
^{148m}_{61}Pm	0.000000104 ± 0.000000039	1.78 × 10^{−8} ± 6.60 × 10^{−9}	0.0000048 ± 0.0000018
^{149}_{61}Pm	1.053 ± 0.021	1.064 ± 0.03	0.557 ± 0.09
^{151}_{61}Pm	0.4204 ± 0.0071	0.431 ± 0.015	0.388 ± 0.061
^{148}_{62}Sm	0.000000149 ± 0.000000041	2.43 × 10^{−8} ± 6.80 × 10^{−9}	0.0000058 ± 0.0000018
^{150}_{62}Sm	0.000061 ± 0.000022	0.0000201 ± 0.0000077	0.00045 ± 0.00018
^{151}_{62}Sm	0.4204 ± 0.0071	0.431 ± 0.015	0.388 ± 0.061
^{153}_{62}Sm	0.1477 ± 0.0071	0.1512 ± 0.0097	0.23 ± 0.015
^{151}_{63}Eu	0.4204 ± 0.0071	0.431 ± 0.015	0.388 ± 0.061
^{152}_{63}Eu	3.24 × 10^{−10} ± 8.50 × 10^{−11}	0 ± 0	3.30 × 10^{−8} ± 1.10 × 10^{−8}
^{154}_{63}Eu	0.000000195 ± 0.000000064	4.00 × 10^{−8} ± 1.10 × 10^{−8}	0.0000033 ± 0.0000011
^{155}_{63}Eu	0.0308 ± 0.0013	0.044 ± 0.01	0.088 ± 0.014

Cumulative fission yield per fission for Pu-239 (%)
Product	Thermal fission yield	Fast fission yield	14-MeV fission yield
^{1}_{1}H	0.00408 ± 0.00041	0.00346 ± 0.00057	-
^{2}_{1}H	0.00135 ± 0.00019	0.00106 ± 0.00016	-
^{3}_{1}H	0.0142 ± 0.0007	0.0142 ± 0.0007	-
^{3}_{2}He	0.0142 ± 0.0007	0.0142 ± 0.0007	-
^{4}_{2}He	0.2192 ± 0.009	0.219 ± 0.009	-
^{85}_{35}Br	0.574 ± 0.026	0.617 ± 0.049	-
^{82}_{36}Kr	0.00175 ± 0.0006	0.00055 ± 0.0002	-
^{85}_{36}Kr	0.136 ± 0.014	0.138 ± 0.017	-
^{85m}_{36}Kr	0.576 ± 0.026	0.617 ± 0.049	-
^{90}_{38}Sr	2.013 ± 0.054	2.031 ± 0.057	-
^{95}_{40}Zr	4.949 ± 0.099	4.682 ± 0.098	-
^{94}_{41}Nb	0.0000168 ± 0.0000045	0.00000255 ± 0.00000069	-
^{95}_{41}Nb	4.946 ± 0.099	4.68 ± 0.098	-
^{95m}_{41}Nb	0.0535 ± 0.0066	0.0506 ± 0.0062	-
^{92}_{42}Mo	0 ± 0	0 ± 0	-
^{94}_{42}Mo	3.60 × 10^{−8} ± 1.30 × 10^{−8}	4.80 × 10^{−9} ± 1.70 × 10^{−9}	-
^{96}_{42}Mo	0.0051 ± 0.0018	0.0017 ± 0.00062	-
^{99}_{42}Mo	6.185 ± 0.056	5.82 ± 0.13	-
^{99}_{43}Tc	6.184 ± 0.056	5.82 ± 0.13	-
^{103}_{44}Ru	6.948 ± 0.083	6.59 ± 0.16	-
^{106}_{44}Ru	4.188 ± 0.092	4.13 ± 0.24	-
^{106}_{45}Rh	4.188 ± 0.092	4.13 ± 0.24	-
^{121m}_{50}Sn	0.0052 ± 0.0011	0.0053 ± 0.0012	-
^{122}_{51}Sb	0.000024 ± 0.0000063	0.0000153 ± 0.000005	-
^{124}_{51}Sb	0.00228 ± 0.00049	0.00154 ± 0.00043	-
^{125}_{51}Sb	0.117 ± 0.015	0.138 ± 0.022	-
^{132}_{52}Te	5.095 ± 0.094	4.92 ± 0.32	-
^{129}_{53}I	1.407 ± 0.086	1.31 ± 0.13	-
^{131}_{53}I	3.724 ± 0.078	4.09 ± 0.12	-
^{133}_{53}I	6.97 ± 0.13	6.99 ± 0.33	-
^{135}_{53}I	6.33 ± 0.23	6.24 ± 0.22	-
^{128}_{54}Xe	0.00000234 ± 0.00000085	0.0000025 ± 0.0000012	-
^{130}_{54}Xe	0.00166 ± 0.00056	0.00231 ± 0.00085	-
^{131m}_{54}Xe	0.0405 ± 0.004	0.0444 ± 0.0044	-
^{133}_{54}Xe	6.99 ± 0.13	7.03 ± 0.33	-
^{133m}_{54}Xe	0.216 ± 0.016	0.223 ± 0.021	-
^{135}_{54}Xe	7.36 ± 0.24	7.5 ± 0.23	-
^{135m}_{54}Xe	1.78 ± 0.21	1.97 ± 0.25	-
^{134}_{55}Cs	0.00067 ± 0.00018	0.00115 ± 0.0003	-
^{137}_{55}Cs	6.588 ± 0.08	6.35 ± 0.12	-
^{140}_{56}Ba	5.322 ± 0.059	5.303 ± 0.074	-
^{140}_{57}La	5.333 ± 0.059	5.324 ± 0.075	-
^{141}_{58}Ce	5.205 ± 0.073	5.01 ± 0.16	-
^{144}_{58}Ce	3.755 ± 0.03	3.504 ± 0.053	-
^{144}_{59}Pr	3.756 ± 0.03	3.505 ± 0.053	-
^{142}_{60}Nd	0.00000145 ± 0.0000004	0.00000251 ± 0.00000072	-
^{144}_{60}Nd	3.756 ± 0.03	3.505 ± 0.053	-
^{147}_{60}Nd	2.044 ± 0.039	1.929 ± 0.046	-
^{147}_{61}Pm	2.044 ± 0.039	1.929 ± 0.046	-
^{148}_{61}Pm	0.0000056 ± 0.0000019	0.000012 ± 0.000004	-
^{148m}_{61}Pm	0.0000118 ± 0.0000044	0.000029 ± 0.000011	-
^{149}_{61}Pm	1.263 ± 0.032	1.275 ± 0.056	-
^{151}_{61}Pm	0.776 ± 0.018	0.796 ± 0.037	-
^{148}_{62}Sm	0.0000168 ± 0.0000046	0.000039 ± 0.000011	-
^{150}_{62}Sm	0.00227 ± 0.00078	0.0051 ± 0.0019	-
^{151}_{62}Sm	0.776 ± 0.018	0.797 ± 0.037	-
^{153}_{62}Sm	0.38 ± 0.03	0.4 ± 0.18	-
^{151}_{63}Eu	0.776 ± 0.018	0.797 ± 0.037	-
^{152}_{63}Eu	0.000000195 ± 0.00000005	0.00000048 ± 0.00000014	-
^{154}_{63}Eu	0.000049 ± 0.000012	0.000127 ± 0.000043	-
^{155}_{63}Eu	0.174 ± 0.03	0.171 ± 0.054	-

JEFF-3.1	Joint Evaluated Fission and Fusion File, Incident-neutron data, http://www-nds.iaea.org/exfor/endf00.htm, 2 October 2006; see also A. Koning, R. Forrest, M. Kellett, R. Mills, H. Henriksson, Y. Rugama, The JEFF-3.1 Nuclear Data Library, JEFF Report 21, OECD/NEA, Paris, France, 2006, ISBN 92-64-02314-3.

== Ordered by mass number ==
Decays, even if lengthy, are given down to the stable nuclide.

Decays with half-lives longer than a century are marked with a single asterisk (*), while decays with a half-life longer than a hundred million years are marked with two asterisks (**).

Yield	Isotope			
0.0508%	selenium-79→*	bromine-79		
0.2717%	krypton-85→	rubidium-85		
5.7518%	strontium-90 →	yttrium-90→	zirconium-90	
6.2956%	zirconium-93 →*	niobium-93		
6.0507%	technetium-99→*	ruthenium-99		
0.3912%	ruthenium-106→	rhodium-106→	palladium-106	
0.1629%	palladium-107→*	silver-107		
0.0003%	cadmium-113m→	cadmium-113 (essentially stable)→**	indium-113	
0.0297%	antimony-125→	tellurium-125m→	tellurium-125	
0.0236%	tin-126 →*	antimony-126→	tellurium-126	
0.9%	iodine-129→*	xenon-129		
2.8336%	iodine-131→	xenon-131		
6.7896%	caesium-133 →	caesium-134→	barium-134	
6.3333%	iodine-135 →	xenon-135 →	caesium-135→*	barium-135
6.3333%	iodine-135 →	xenon-135 →	xenon-136 (essentially stable)→**	barium-136
6.0899%	caesium-137→	barium-137		
2.2713%	promethium-147→	samarium-147 (essentially stable)→**	neodymium-143	
1.0888%	samarium-149			
0.4203%	samarium-151			
0.0330%	europium-155 →	gadolinium-155		
0.0065%	gadolinium-157			

== Half lives, decay modes, and branching fractions ==
Half-lives and decay branching fractions for fission products
Nuclide	Half-life	Decay mode	Branching fraction	Source	Notes
^{85}_{35}Br	2.9 ± 0.06 m	β^{−}	1.0		(Note: β^{−} decay branches of 0.9982 ± 0.0002 to Kr-85m and 0.0018 ± 0.0002 to Kr-85.)
^{85}_{36}Kr	10.752 ± 0.023 y	β^{−}	1.0		
^{85m}_{36}Kr	4.48 ± 0.008 h	IT	0.214 ± 0.005		
^{85m}_{36}Kr	4.48 ± 0.008 h	β^{−}	0.786 ± 0.005		
^{90}_{38}Sr	28.8 ± 0.07 y	β^{−}	1.0		
^{95}_{40}Zr	64.032 ± 0.006 d	β^{−}	1.0		
^{94}_{41}Nb	(7.3 ± 0.9) × 10^{6} d	β^{−}	1.0		
^{95m}_{41}Nb	3.61 ± 0.03 d	β^{−}	0.025 ± 0.001		(Note: ENSDF branching fractions: 0.944 ± 0.007 for IT and 0.056 ± 0.007 for β^{−}.)
^{95m}_{41}Nb	3.61 ± 0.03 d	IT	0.975 ± 0.001		(Note: ENSDF branching fractions: 0.944 ± 0.007 for IT and 0.056 ± 0.007 for β^{−}.)
^{95}_{41}Nb	34.985 ± 0.012 d	β^{−}	1.0		
^{99}_{43}Tc	(2.111 ± 0.012) × 10^{5} y	β^{−}	1.0		
^{103}_{44}Ru	39.247 ± 0.013 d	β^{−}	1.0		
^{106}_{44}Ru	1.018 ± 0.005 y	β^{−}	1.0		
^{106}_{45}Rh	30.1 ± 0.3 s	β^{−}	1.0		
^{121m}_{50}Sn	55 ± 5 y	β^{−}	0.224 ± 0.02		
^{121m}_{50}Sn	55 ± 5 y	IT	0.776 ± 0.02		
^{122}_{51}Sb	2.7238 ± 0.0002 d	EC	0.0241 ± 0.0012		
^{122}_{51}Sb	2.7238 ± 0.0002 d	β^{−}	0.9759 ± 0.0012		
^{124}_{51}Sb	60.2 ± 0.03 d	β^{−}	1.0		
^{125}_{51}Sb	2.7584 ± 0.0006 y	β^{−}	1.0		
^{129}_{53}I	(5.89 ± 0.23) × 10^{9} d	β^{−}	1.0		
^{131}_{53}I	8.0233 ± 0.0019 d	β^{−}	1.0		
^{133}_{53}I	20.87 ± 0.08 h	β^{−}	1.0		(Note: β^{−} decay branch of 0.0288 ± 0.0002 to Xe-133m.)
^{135}_{53}I	6.57 ± 0.02 h	β^{−}	1.0		
^{131m}_{54}Xe	11.930 ± 0.016 d	IT	1.0		
^{133}_{54}Xe	5.243 ± 0.001 d	β^{−}	1.0		
^{133m}_{54}Xe	2.19 ± 0.01 d	IT	1.0		
^{135}_{54}Xe	9.14 ± 0.02 h	β^{−}	1.0		
^{135m}_{54}Xe	15.29 ± 0.05 m	β^{−}	0.003 ± 0.003		(Note: Branching fractions were averaged from ENSDF database.)
^{135m}_{54}Xe	15.29 ± 0.05 m	IT	0.997 ± 0.003		(Note: Branching fractions were averaged from ENSDF database.)
^{134}_{55}Cs	2.063 ± 0.003 y	EC	0.000003 ± 0.000001		(Note: Branching fractions were adopted from ENSDF database.)
^{134}_{55}Cs	2.063 ± 0.003 y	β^{−}	0.999997 ± 0.000001		(Note: Branching fractions were adopted from ENSDF database.)
^{137}_{55}Cs	30.05 ± 0.08 y	β^{−}	1.0		
^{140}_{56}Ba	12.753 ± 0.004 d	β^{−}	1.0		
^{140}_{57}La	1.67850 ± 0.00017 d	β^{−}	1.0		
^{141}_{58}Ce	32.508 ± 0.010 d	β^{−}	1.0		
^{144}_{58}Ce	285.1 ± 0.6 d	β^{−}	1.0		
^{144}_{59}Pr	17.28 ± 0.05 m	β^{−}	1.0		
^{147}_{60}Nd	10.98 ± 0.01 d	β^{−}	1.0		
^{147}_{61}Pm	2.6234 ± 0.0002 y	β^{−}	1.0		
^{148m}_{61}Pm	41.29 ± 0.11 d	IT	0.042 ± 0.007		
^{148m}_{61}Pm	41.29 ± 0.11 d	β^{−}	0.958 ± 0.007		
^{148}_{61}Pm	5.368 ± 0.002 d	β^{−}	1.0		
^{149}_{61}Pm	2.2117 ± 0.0021 d	β^{−}	1.0		
^{151}_{61}Pm	1.1833 ± 0.0017 d	β^{−}	1.0		
^{151}_{62}Sm	90 ± 6 y	β^{−}	1.0		
^{153}_{62}Sm	1.938 ± 0.010 d	β^{−}	1.0		
^{152}_{63}Eu	(4.941 ± 0.007) × 10^{3} d	β^{−}	0.279 ± 0.003		(Note: Branching fractions were adopted from LNHB data.)
^{152}_{63}Eu	(4.941 ± 0.007) × 10^{3} d	EC	0.721 ± 0.003		(Note: Branching fractions were adopted from LNHB data.)
^{154}_{63}Eu	(3.1381 ± 0.0014) × 10^{3} d	EC	0.00018 ± 0.00013		
^{154}_{63}Eu	(3.1381 ± 0.0014) × 10^{3} d	β^{−}	0.99982 ± 0.00013		
^{155}_{63}Eu	4.753 ± 0.016 y	β^{−}	1.0		

== Ordered by thermal neutron absorption cross section ==
Barns	Yield	Isotope	t_{½}	Comment
2,650,000	6.3333%	^{135}I → ^{135}Xe	6.57 h	Most important neutron poison; neutron capture rapidly converts ^{135}Xe to ^{136}Xe; remainder decays (9.14 h) to ^{135}Cs (2.3 My).
254,000	0.0065%	^{157}Gd	∞	Neutron poison, but low yield.
40,140	1.0888%	^{149}Sm	∞	2nd most important neutron poison.
20,600	0.0003%	^{113m}Cd	14.1 y	Most will be destroyed by neutron capture.
15,200	0.4203%	^{151}Sm	90 y	Most will be destroyed by neutron capture.
3,950; 60,900	0.0330%	^{155}Eu → ^{155}Gd	4.76 y	Both neutron poisons.
96	2.2713%	^{147}Pm	2.62 y	Suitable for radioisotope thermoelectric generators with annual or semi-annual refueling.
80	2.8336%	^{131}I	8.02 d	
29; 140	6.7896%	^{133}Cs → ^{134}Cs	∞ 2.065 y	Neutron capture converts a few percent of nonradioactive ^{133}Cs to ^{134}Cs, which has very low direct yield because beta decay stops at ^{134}Xe; further capture will add to long-lived ^{135}Cs.
20	6.0507%	^{99}Tc	211 ky	Candidate for disposal by nuclear transmutation.
18	0.6576%	^{129}I	15.7 My	Candidate for disposal by nuclear transmutation.
2.7	6.2956%	^{93}Zr	1.53 My	Transmutation impractical.
1.8	0.1629%	^{107}Pd	6.5 My	
1.66	0.2717%	^{85}Kr	10.78 y	
0.90	5.7518%	^{90}Sr	28.9 y	
0.15	0.3912%	^{106}Ru	373.6 d	
0.11	6.0899%	^{137}Cs	30.17 y	
	0.0297%	^{125}Sb	2.76 y	
	0.0236%	^{126}Sn	230 ky	
	0.0508%	^{79}Se	327 ky	
