= Isotopes of terbium =

Isotopes of terbium (_{65}Tb)
Main isotopes			Decay	
Isotope	abundance	half-life (t_{1/2})	mode	product
^{157}Tb	synth	71 y	ε	^{157}Gd
^{158}Tb	synth	180 y	ε	^{158}Gd
^{158}Tb	synth	180 y	β^{−}	^{158}Dy
^{159}Tb	100%	stable		
^{160}Tb	synth	72.3 d	β^{−}	^{160}Dy
^{161}Tb	synth	6.948 d	β^{−}	^{161}Dy

Standard atomic weight A_{r}°(Tb)
- 158.925354±0.000007; 158.93±0.01 (abridged)

Naturally occurring terbium (_{65}Tb) is composed of one stable isotope, ^{159}Tb. Thirty-seven radioisotopes have been characterized, with the most stable being ^{158}Tb with a half-life of 180 years, ^{157}Tb with a half-life of 71 years, and ^{160}Tb with a half-life of 72.3 days. All of the remaining radioactive isotopes have half-lives that are less than one week, and the majority of these have half-lives that are less than 24 seconds. This element also has 27 meta states, with the most stable being ^{156m2}Tb (t_{1/2} = 24.4 hours), ^{154m2}Tb (t_{1/2} = 22.7 hours) and ^{154m1}Tb (t_{1/2} = 21.5 hours).

The primary decay mode before the most abundant stable isotope, ^{159}Tb, is electron capture to gadolinium isotopes, and the primary mode after is beta decay to dysprosium isotopes.

It is also the heaviest element with no observationally stable isotopes that are predicted to be radioactive excluding the possibilities of proton decay (never observed so far) and spontaneous fission (not observed until the actinides).

== List of isotopes ==
Nuclide (Note: ^{m}Tb – Excited nuclear isomer.)	Z	N	Isotopic mass (Da) (Note: ( ) – Uncertainty (1σ) is given in concise form in parentheses after the corresponding last digits.) (Note: # – Atomic mass marked #: value and uncertainty derived not from purely experimental data, but at least partly from trends from the Mass Surface (TMS).)	Discovery year	Half-life (Note: # – Values marked # are not purely derived from experimental data, but at least partly from trends of neighboring nuclides (TNN).)	Decay mode (Note: Modes of decay: EC: / Electron capture; IT: / Isomeric transition; p: / Proton emission)	Daughter isotope (Note: Bold italics symbol as daughter – Daughter product is nearly stable.) (Note: Bold symbol as daughter – Daughter product is stable.)	Spin and parity (Note: ( ) spin value – Indicates spin with weak assignment arguments.)	Isotopic abundance
Nuclide	Excitation energy			Discovery year	Half-life	Decay mode	Daughter isotope	Spin and parity	Isotopic abundance
^{135}Tb	65	70	134.96452(43)#	2004	1.01(28) ms	p	^{134}Gd	(7/2−)	
^{136}Tb	65	71	135.96146(54)#	2026	200# ms [>310 ns]			5−#	
^{137}Tb	65	72	136.95602(43)#	2026	600# ms [>310 ns]			3/2+#	
^{138}Tb	65	73	137.95319(32)#	2026	800# ms [>310 ns]			2+#	
^{139}Tb	65	74	138.94833(32)#	1999	1.6(2) s	β^{+}	^{139}Gd	5/2−#	
^{140}Tb	65	75	139.94581(86)	1986	2.29(15) s	β^{+} (99.74%)	^{140}Gd	(7+)	
^{140}Tb	65	75	139.94581(86)	1986	2.29(15) s	EC (<3%)	^{140}Gd	(7+)	
^{140}Tb	65	75	139.94581(86)	1986	2.29(15) s	β^{+}, p (0.26%)	^{139}Eu	(7+)	
^{141}Tb	65	76	140.94145(11)	1986	3.5(2) s	β^{+}	^{141}Gd	(5/2−)	
^{141m}Tb (Note: Order of ground state and isomer is uncertain.) (Note: Discovery of this isotope is disputed.)	0(200)# keV			(1988) (Note: Only published in a conference proceeding and not a refereed journal)	7.9(6) s	β^{+}	^{141}Gd	11/2−#	
^{142}Tb	65	77	141.93928(75)	1991	597(17) ms	β^{+} (96.8%)	^{142}Gd	1+	
^{142}Tb	65	77	141.93928(75)	1991	597(17) ms	EC (3.2%)	^{142}Gd	1+	
^{142}Tb	65	77	141.93928(75)	1991	597(17) ms	β^{+}, p (0.0022%)	^{141}Eu	1+	
^{142m1}Tb	279.7(4) keV			1991	303(17) ms	IT	^{142}Tb	5−	
^{142m2}Tb	652.1(6) keV			2009	26(1) μs	IT	^{142}Tb	8+	
^{143}Tb	65	78	142.935137(55)	1985	12(1) s	β^{+}	^{143}Gd	(11/2−)	
^{143m}Tb	0(100)# keV			(1986) (Note: Half-life not measured, not included in discovery database)	17(4) s			5/2+#	
^{144}Tb	65	79	143.933045(30)	1982	~1 s	β^{+}	^{144}Gd	1+	
^{144m1}Tb	396.9(5) keV			1982	4.25(15) s	IT (66%)	^{144}Tb	6−	
^{144m1}Tb	396.9(5) keV			1982	4.25(15) s	β^{+} (34%)	^{144}Gd	6−	
^{144m2}Tb	476.2(5) keV			1996	2.8(3) μs	IT	^{144}Tb	(8−)	
^{144m3}Tb	517.1(5) keV			1996	670(60) ns	IT	^{144}Tb	(9+)	
^{144m4}Tb	544.5(6) keV			(1996)	<300 ns	IT	^{144}Tb	(10+)	
^{145}Tb	65	80	144.92872(12)	1981	30.9(6) s	β^{+}	^{145}Gd	(11/2−)	
^{145m}Tb	860(230) keV			1993				(3/2+)	
^{146}Tb	65	81	145.927253(48)	1974	8(4) s	β^{+}	^{146}Gd	1+	
^{146m1}Tb	150(100)# keV			1982	24.1(5) s	β^{+}	^{146}Gd	5−	
^{146m2}Tb	930(100)# keV			1984	1.18(2) ms	IT	^{146}Tb	10+	
^{147}Tb	65	82	146.9240546(87)	1969	1.64(3) h	β^{+}	^{147}Gd	(1/2+)	
^{147m}Tb	50.6(9) keV			1969	1.87(5) min	β^{+}	^{147}Gd	(11/2−)	
^{148}Tb	65	83	147.924275(13)	1960	60(1) min	β^{+}	^{148}Gd	2−	
^{148m1}Tb	90.1(3) keV			1973	2.20(5) min	β^{+}	^{148}Gd	(9)+	
^{148m2}Tb	8618.6(10) keV			1980	1.310(7) μs	IT	^{148}Tb	(27+)	
^{149}Tb	65	84	148.9232538(39)	1950	4.118(25) h	β^{+} (83.3%)	^{149}Gd	1/2+	
^{149}Tb	65	84	148.9232538(39)	1950	4.118(25) h	α (16.7%)	^{145}Eu	1/2+	
^{149m}Tb	35.78(13) keV			1962	4.16(4) min	β^{+} (99.98%)	^{149}Gd	11/2−	
^{149m}Tb	35.78(13) keV			1962	4.16(4) min	α (0.022%)	^{145}Eu	11/2−	
^{150}Tb	65	85	149.9236648(79)	1959	3.48(16) h	β^{+}	^{150}Gd	(2)−	
^{150m}Tb	461(27) keV			1972	5.8(2) min	β^{+}	^{150}Gd	9+	
^{151}Tb	65	86	150.9231090(44)	1953	17.609(1) h	β^{+} (99.99%)	^{151}Gd	1/2+	
^{151}Tb	65	86	150.9231090(44)	1953	17.609(1) h	α (0.0095%)	^{147}Eu	1/2+	
^{151m}Tb	99.53(5) keV			1978	25(3) s	IT (93.4%)	^{151}Tb	11/2−	
^{151m}Tb	99.53(5) keV			1978	25(3) s	β^{+} (6.6%)	^{151}Gd	11/2−	
^{152}Tb	65	87	151.924082(43)	1959	17.8784(95) h	EC (83%)	^{152}Gd	2−	
^{152}Tb	65	87	151.924082(43)	1959	17.8784(95) h	β^{+} (17%)	^{152}Gd	2−	
^{152}Tb	65	87	151.924082(43)	1959	17.8784(95) h	α (<7×10^{−7}%)	^{148}Eu	2−	
^{152m1}Tb	342.15(16) keV			1980	960(10) ns	IT	^{152}Tb	5−	
^{152m2}Tb	501.74(19) keV			1959	4.2(1) min	IT (78.9%)	^{152}Tb	8+	
^{152m2}Tb	501.74(19) keV			1959	4.2(1) min	β^{+} (21.1%)	^{152}Gd	8+	
^{153}Tb	65	88	152.9234417(42)	1957	2.34(1) d	β^{+}	^{153}Gd	5/2+	
^{153m}Tb	163.175(5) keV			1965	186(4) μs	IT	^{153}Tb	11/2−	
^{154}Tb	65	89	153.924684(49)	1950	9.994(39) h	β^{+}	^{154}Gd	3−	
^{154m1}Tb	130(50)# keV			1955	21.5(4) h	β^{+}	^{154}Gd	0−	
^{154m2}Tb	200(150)# keV			1971	22.7(5) h	β^{+}	^{154}Gd	7−	
^{154m3}Tb	405(150)# keV			1982	513(42) ns	IT	^{154}Tb		
^{155}Tb	65	90	154.923510(11)	1957	5.2346(36) d	EC	^{155}Gd	3/2+	
^{156}Tb	65	91	155.9247542(40)	1950	5.35(10) d	β^{+}	^{156}Gd	3−	
^{156m1}Tb	88.4(2) keV			1955	5.3(2) h	IT	^{156}Tb	(0+)	
^{156m2}Tb	100(50)# keV			1970	24.4(10) h	IT	^{156}Tb	(7−)	
^{157}Tb	65	92	156.9240319(11)	1960	71(7) y	EC	^{157}Gd	3/2+	
^{158}Tb	65	93	157.9254199(14)	1957	180(11) y	β^{+} (83.4%)	^{158}Gd	3−	
^{158}Tb	65	93	157.9254199(14)	1957	180(11) y	β^{−} (16.6%)	^{158}Dy	3−	
^{158m1}Tb	110.3(12) keV			1957	10.70(17) s	IT	^{158}Tb	0−	
^{158m2}Tb	388.39(11) keV			1967	0.40(4) ms	IT	^{158}Tb	7−	
^{159}Tb (Note: Fission product)	65	94	158.9253537(12)	1933	Stable			3/2+	1.0000
^{160}Tb	65	95	159.9271746(12)	1943	72.3(2) d	β^{−}	^{160}Dy	3−	
^{161}Tb	65	96	160.9275768(13)	1949	6.948(5) d	β^{−}	^{161}Dy	3/2+	
^{162}Tb	65	97	161.9292754(22)	1965	7.60(15) min	β^{−}	^{162}Dy	(1−)	
^{162m}Tb	286(3) keV			2020	10# min			4−#	
^{163}Tb	65	98	162.9306536(44)	1966	19.5(3) min	β^{−}	^{163}Dy	3/2+	
^{164}Tb	65	99	163.9333276(20)	1968	3.0(1) min	β^{−}	^{164}Dy	(5+)	
^{164m}Tb	145(12) keV			2020	2# min			2+#	
^{165}Tb	65	100	164.9349552(17)	1983	2.11(10) min	β^{−}	^{165}Dy	(3/2+)	
^{165m}Tb	207(5) keV			(1986)	0.81(8) μs	IT	^{165}Tb	(7/2−)	
^{166}Tb	65	101	165.9379397(16)	1996	27.1(15) s	β^{−}	^{166}Dy	(1−)	
^{166m}Tb	159.0(15) keV			(1986)	3.5(4) μs	IT	^{166}Tb	4−#	
^{167}Tb	65	102	166.9400070(21)	1999	18.9(16) s	β^{−}	^{167}Dy	(3/2+)	
^{167m}Tb	200(6) keV			(1986)	1.2(1) μs	IT	^{167}Tb	(7/2−)	
^{168}Tb	65	103	167.9433371(45)	1999	9.4(4) s	β^{−}	^{168}Dy	(4−)	
^{168m}Tb	211(1) keV			(1986)	0.71(3) μs	IT	^{168}Tb	(6+)	
^{169}Tb	65	104	168.94581(32)#	2012	5.13(32) s	β^{−}	^{169}Dy	3/2+#	
^{170}Tb	65	105	169.94986(32)#	2012	960(78) ms	β^{−}	^{170}Dy	2−#	
^{171}Tb	65	106	170.95301(43)#	2012	1.23(10) s	β^{−}	^{171}Dy	3/2+#	
^{172}Tb	65	107	171.95739(54)#	2012	760(190) ms	β^{−}	^{172}Dy	6+#	
^{173}Tb	65	108	172.96081(54)#	2018	400# ms [>550 ns]			3/2+#	
^{174}Tb	65	109	173.96568(54)#	2018	240# ms [>550 ns]			2−#	
^{175}Tb	65	110		2026					
This table header & footer:

== See also ==
Daughter products other than terbium

- Isotopes of dysprosium
- Isotopes of gadolinium
- Isotopes of europium
