= Krypton-85 =

Isotope of krypton

General
- Symbol: ^{85}Kr
- Names: krypton-85
- Protons (Z): 36
- Neutrons (N): 49

Nuclide data
- Half-life (t_{1/2}): 10.728 years
- Isotope mass: 84.9125273(21) Da
- Spin: 9/2+
- Excess energy: −81480.267 keV
- Nuclear binding energy: 8698.562 keV
- Decay products: ^{85}Rb

Decay modes
- Decay mode: Decay energy (MeV)
- Beta decay: 0.687
- Beta decay: 0.173

Krypton-85 (^{85}Kr) is a radioisotope of krypton, distributed throughout the atmosphere and presently forming about 15 ppt of atmospheric krypton on average.

Krypton-85 has a half-life of 10.76 years and a maximum decay energy of 687 keV. It decays into stable rubidium-85. Its most common decay (99.57%) is by beta particle emission with a maximum energy of 687 keV and an average energy of 251 keV. The second most common decay (0.43%) is by beta particle emission (maximum energy of 173 keV) followed by gamma ray emission (energy of 514 keV). Other decay modes have very small probabilities and emit less energetic gamma rays. Krypton-85 is mostly synthetic, though it is produced naturally in trace quantities by cosmic ray spallation.

In terms of radiotoxicity, 440 Bq of ^{85}Kr is equivalent to 1 Bq of radon-222, without considering the rest of the radon decay chain.

== Presence in Earth's atmosphere ==
Medium-lived fission products
Nuclide	t_{1/2}	Yield	Q (Note: Decay energy is split among β, neutrino, and γ if any.)	βγ
	(a)	(%) (Note: Per 65 thermal neutron fissions of ^{235}U and 35 of ^{239}Pu.)	(keV)	
^{155}Eu	4.74	0.0803 (Note: Neutron poison; in thermal reactors, most is destroyed by further neutron capture.)	252	βγ
^{85}Kr	10.73	0.2180 (Note: Less than 1/4 of mass-85 fission products as most bypass ground state: ^{85}Br → ^{85m}Kr → ^{85}Rb.)	687	βγ
^{113m}Cd	13.9	0.0008	316	β
^{90}Sr	28.91	4.505	2826 (Note: Has decay energy 546 keV; its decay product ^{90}Y has decay energy 2.28 MeV with weak gamma branching.)	β
^{137}Cs	30.04	6.337	1176	βγ
^{121m}Sn	43.9	0.00005	390	βγ
^{151}Sm	94.6	0.5314	77	β

=== Natural production ===
Krypton-85 is produced in small quantities by the interaction of cosmic rays with stable krypton-84 in the atmosphere. Natural sources maintain an equilibrium inventory of about 0.09 PBq in the atmosphere.

=== Anthropogenic production ===
As of 2009, the total amount in the atmosphere is estimated at 5500 PBq due to anthropogenic sources. At the end of the year 2000, it was estimated to be 4800 PBq, and in 1973, an estimated 1961 PBq (53 megacuries). The most important of these human sources is nuclear fuel reprocessing, as krypton-85 is one of the seven common medium-lived fission products. Nuclear fission produces about three atoms of krypton-85 for every 1000 fissions (i.e., it has a fission yield of 0.3%). Most or all of this krypton-85 is retained in the spent nuclear fuel rods; spent fuel on discharge from a reactor contains between 0.13 and 1.8 PBq/Mg of krypton-85. Some of this spent fuel is reprocessed. Current nuclear reprocessing releases the gaseous ^{85}Kr into the atmosphere when the spent fuel is dissolved. It would be possible in principle to capture and store this krypton gas as nuclear waste or for use. The cumulative global amount of krypton-85 released from reprocessing activity has been estimated as 10,600 PBq as of 2000. The global inventory noted above is smaller than this amount due to radioactive decay; a smaller fraction is dissolved into the deep oceans.

Other man-made sources are small contributors to the total. Atmospheric nuclear weapons tests released an estimated 111–185 PBq. The 1979 accident at the Three Mile Island nuclear power plant released about 1.6 PBq (43 kCi). The Chernobyl accident released about 35 PBq, and the Fukushima Daiichi accident released an estimated 44–84 PBq.

The average atmospheric concentration of krypton-85 was approximately 0.6 Bq/m^{3} in 1976, and has increased to approximately 1.3 Bq/m^{3} as of 2005. These are approximate global average values; concentrations are higher locally around nuclear reprocessing facilities, and are generally higher in the northern hemisphere than in the southern hemisphere.

For wide-area atmospheric monitoring, krypton-85 is the best indicator for clandestine plutonium separations.

Krypton-85 releases increase the electrical conductivity of atmospheric air. Meteorological effects are expected to be stronger closer to the source of the emissions.

== Uses in industry ==
Krypton-85 is used in arc discharge lamps commonly used in the entertainment industry for large HMI film lights as well as high-intensity discharge lamps. The presence of krypton-85 in discharge tube of the lamps can make the lamps easy to ignite. Early experimental krypton-85 lighting developments included a railroad signal light designed in 1957 and an illuminated highway sign erected in Arizona in 1969. A 60 μCi (2.22 MBq) capsule of krypton-85 was used by the random number server HotBits (an allusion to the radioactive element being a quantum mechanical source of entropy), but was replaced with a 5 μCi (185 kBq) Cs-137 source in 1998.

Krypton-85 is also used to inspect aircraft components for small defects. Krypton-85 is allowed to penetrate small cracks, and then its presence is detected by autoradiography. The method is called "krypton gas penetrant imaging". The gas penetrates smaller openings than the liquids used in dye penetrant inspection and fluorescent penetrant inspection.

Krypton-85 was used in cold-cathode voltage regulator electron tubes, such as the type 5651.

Krypton-85 is also used for Industrial Process Control mainly for thickness and density measurements as an alternative to Sr-90 or Cs-137.

Krypton-85 is also used as a charge neutralizer in aerosol sampling systems.
