= Isotopes of erbium =

Isotopes of erbium (_{68}Er)
Main isotopes			Decay	
Isotope	abundance	half-life (t_{1/2})	mode	product
^{162}Er	0.139%	stable		
^{164}Er	1.60%	stable		
^{165}Er	synth	10.36 h	ε	^{165}Ho
^{166}Er	33.5%	stable		
^{167}Er	22.9%	stable		
^{168}Er	27.0%	stable		
^{169}Er	synth	9.39 d	β^{−}	^{169}Tm
^{170}Er	14.9%	stable		

Standard atomic weight A_{r}°(Er)
- 167.259±0.003; 167.26±0.01 (abridged)

Naturally occurring erbium (_{68}Er) is composed of six stable isotopes, with ^{166}Er being the most abundant (33.503% natural abundance). Radioisotopes have been characterized with from ^{145}Er to ^{175}Er, all having half-lives less than ten days: the most stable are ^{169}Er (9.39 days), ^{172}Er (49.3 hours), and ^{160}Er (28.58 hours). All of the remaining radioactive isotopes have half-lives that are less than 11 hours, and the majority of these have half-lives that are less than 4 minutes. This element also has numerous meta states, with the most stable being ^{149m1}Er (t_{1/2} = 8.9 seconds).

The primary decay mode before the most abundant stable isotope, ^{166}Er, is electron capture to holmium isotopes, and the primary mode after is beta decay to thulium isotopes. All isotopes of erbium are either radioactive or observationally stable, meaning that they are predicted to be radioactive but no actual decay has been observed.

== List of isotopes ==
Nuclide (Note: ^{m}Er – Excited nuclear isomer.)	Z	N	Isotopic mass (Da) (Note: ( ) – Uncertainty (1σ) is given in concise form in parentheses after the corresponding last digits.) (Note: # – Atomic mass marked #: value and uncertainty derived not from purely experimental data, but at least partly from trends from the Mass Surface (TMS).)	Discovery year	Half-life (Note: # – Values marked # are not purely derived from experimental data, but at least partly from trends of neighboring nuclides (TNN).)	Decay mode (Note: Modes of decay: EC: / Electron capture; IT: / Isomeric transition; p: / Proton emission)	Daughter isotope (Note: Bold symbol as daughter – Daughter product is stable.)	Spin and parity (Note: ( ) spin value – Indicates spin with weak assignment arguments.)	Natural abundance (mole fraction)	
Nuclide	Excitation energy			Discovery year	Half-life	Decay mode	Daughter isotope	Spin and parity	Normal proportion	Range of variation
^{143}Er	68	75	142.96655(43)#	2026	200# ms			9/2−#		
^{144}Er	68	76	143.96070(21)#	2003	400# ms [> 200 ns]			0+		
^{145}Er	68	77	144.95787(22)#	1989	900(200) ms	β^{+}	^{145}Ho	1/2+#		
^{145}Er	68	77	144.95787(22)#	1989	900(200) ms	β^{+}, p (?%)	^{144}Dy	1/2+#		
^{145m}Er	205(4)# keV			2003	1.0(3) s	β^{+}	^{145}Ho	(11/2-)		
^{145m}Er	205(4)# keV			2003	1.0(3) s	β^{+}, p (?%)	^{144}Dy	(11/2-)		
^{146}Er	68	78	145.952418(7)	1993	1.7(6) s	β^{+}	^{146}Ho	0+		
^{146}Er	68	78	145.952418(7)	1993	1.7(6) s	β^{+}, p (?%)	^{145}Dy	0+		
^{147}Er	68	79	146.94996(4)#	1992	3.2(12) s	β^{+}	^{147}Ho	(1/2+)		
^{147}Er	68	79	146.94996(4)#	1992	3.2(12) s	β^{+}, p (?%)	^{146}Dy	(1/2+)		
^{147m}Er (Note: Order of ground state and isomer is uncertain.)	100(50)# keV			2010	1.6(2) s	β^{+}	^{147}Ho	(11/2−)		
^{147m}Er	100(50)# keV			2010	1.6(2) s	β^{+}, p (?%)	^{146}Dy	(11/2−)		
^{148}Er	68	80	147.944735(11)#	1982	4.6(2) s	β^{+} (99.85%)	^{148}Ho	0+		
^{148}Er	68	80	147.944735(11)#	1982	4.6(2) s	β^{+}, p (0.15%)	^{147}Dy	0+		
^{148m}Er	2913,2(4) keV			1982	13(3) μs	IT	^{148}Er	(10+)		
^{149}Er	68	81	148.94231(3)	1984	4(2) s	β^{+} (93%)	^{149}Ho	(1/2+)		
^{149}Er	68	81	148.94231(3)	1984	4(2) s	β^{+}, p (7%)	^{148}Dy	(1/2+)		
^{149m1}Er	741.8(2) keV			1985	8.9(2) s	β^{+} (96.3%)	^{149}Ho	(11/2−)		
^{149m1}Er	741.8(2) keV			1985	8.9(2) s	IT (3.5%)	^{149}Er	(11/2−)		
^{149m1}Er	741.8(2) keV			1985	8.9(2) s	β^{+}, p (0.18%)	^{148}Dy	(11/2−)		
^{149m2}Er	2611.1(3) keV			1987	0.61(8) μs	IT	^{149}Er	(19/2+)		
^{149m3}Er	3302(7) keV			1987	4.8(1) μs	IT	^{149}Er	(27/2−)		
^{150}Er	68	82	149.937916(18)	1982	18.5(7) s	β^{+}	^{150}Ho	0+		
^{150m}Er	2796.5(5) keV			1982	2.55(10) μs	IT	^{150}Er	10+		
^{151}Er	68	83	150.937449(18)	1970	23.5(20) s	β^{+}	^{151}Ho	(7/2−)		
^{151m1}Er	2586.0(5) keV			1980	580(20) ms	IT (95.3%)	^{151}Er	(27/2−)		
^{151m1}Er	2586.0(5) keV			1980	580(20) ms	β^{+} (4.7%)	^{151}Ho	(27/2−)		
^{151m2}Er	10286.6(10) keV			1990	0.42(5) μs	IT	^{151}Er	(65/2-, 61/2+)		
^{152}Er	68	84	151.935050(9)	1963	10.3(1) s	α (90%)	^{148}Dy	0+		
^{152}Er	68	84	151.935050(9)	1963	10.3(1) s	β^{+} (10%)	^{152}Ho	0+		
^{153}Er	68	85	152.935086(10)	1963	37.1(2) s	α (53%)	^{149}Dy	7/2−		
^{153}Er	68	85	152.935086(10)	1963	37.1(2) s	β^{+} (47%)	^{153}Ho	7/2−		
^{153m1}Er	2798.2(10) keV			1979	373(9) ns	IT	^{153}Er	(27/2-)		
^{153m2}Er	5248.1(10) keV			1980	248(32) ns	IT	^{153}Er	(41/2-)		
^{154}Er	68	86	153.932791(5)	1963	3.73(9) min	β^{+} (99.53%)	^{154}Ho	0+		
^{154}Er	68	86	153.932791(5)	1963	3.73(9) min	α (0.47%)	^{150}Dy	0+		
^{155}Er	68	87	154.933216(7)	1969	5.3(3) min	β^{+} (99.978%)	^{155}Ho	7/2−		
^{155}Er	68	87	154.933216(7)	1969	5.3(3) min	α (0.022%)	^{151}Dy	7/2−		
^{156}Er	68	88	155.931066(26)	1967	19.5(10) min	β^{+}	^{156}Ho	0+		
^{156}Er	68	88	155.931066(26)	1967	19.5(10) min	α (1.2×10^{−5}%)	^{152}Dy	0+		
^{157}Er	68	89	156.931923(28)	1965	18.65(10) min	β^{+}	^{157}Ho	3/2−		
^{157m}Er	155.4(3) keV			(1971) (Note: Only published in a conference proceeding and not a refereed journal.)	76(6) ms	IT	^{157}Er	9/2+		
^{158}Er	68	90	157.929893(27)	1960	2.29(6) h	EC	^{158}Ho	0+		
^{159}Er	68	91	158.930691(4)	1961	36(1) min	β^{+}	^{159}Ho	3/2−		
^{159m1}Er	182.602(24) keV			1975	337(14) ns	IT	^{159}Er	9/2+		
^{159m2}Er	429.05(3) keV			1975	590(60) ns	IT	^{159}Er	11/2−		
^{160}Er	68	92	159.929077(26)	1954	28.58(9) h	EC	^{160}Ho	0+		
^{161}Er	68	93	160.930004(9)	1954	3.21(3) h	β^{+}	^{161}Ho	3/2−		
^{161m}Er	396.44(4) keV			1969	7.5(7) μs	IT	^{161}Er	11/2−		
^{162}Er	68	94	161.9287873(8)	1938	Observationally Stable (Note: Believed to undergo α decay to ^{158}Dy or β^{+}β^{+} to ^{162}Dy with a half-life over 1.40×10^{14} years)			0+	0.00139(5)	
^{162m}Er	2026.01(13) keV			(2012) (Note: Half-life shorter than 100ns, not included in discovery database)	88(16) ns	IT	^{162}Er	7(-)		
^{163}Er	68	95	162.930040(5)	1953	75.0(4) min	β^{+}	^{163}Ho	5/2−		
^{163m}Er	445.5(6) keV			1970	580(100) ns	IT	^{163}Er	(11/2−)		
^{164}Er	68	96	163.9292077(8)	1938	Observationally Stable (Note: Believed to undergo α decay to ^{160}Dy or β^{+}β^{+} to ^{164}Dy)			0+	0.01601(3)	
^{165}Er	68	97	164.9307335(10)	1950	10.36(4) h	EC	^{165}Ho	5/2−		
^{165m1}Er	551.3(6) keV			1974	250(30) ns	IT	^{165}Er	11/2-		
^{165m2}Er	1823.0(6) keV			2012	370(40) ns	IT	^{165}Er	(19/2)		
^{166}Er	68	98	165.9303011(4)	1934	Observationally Stable (Note: Believed to undergo α decay to ^{162}Dy)			0+	0.33503(36)	
^{167}Er	68	99	166.9320562(3)	1934	Observationally Stable (Note: Believed to undergo α decay to ^{163}Dy)			7/2+	0.22869(9)	
^{167m}Er	207.801(5) keV			1963	2.269(6) s	IT	^{167}Er	1/2−		
^{168}Er	68	100	167.93237828(28)	1934	Observationally Stable (Note: Believed to undergo α decay to ^{164}Dy)			0+	0.26978(18)	
^{168m}Er	1094.0383(16) keV			1957	109.0(7) ns	IT	^{168}Er	4-		
^{169}Er	68	101	168.9345984(3)	1956	9.392(18) d	β^{−}	^{169}Tm	1/2−		
^{169m1}Er	92.05(10) keV			(1969)	285(20) ns	IT	^{169}Er	(5/2)-		
^{169m2}Er	243.69(17) keV			(1969)	200(10) ns	IT	^{169}Er	7/2+		
^{170}Er	68	102	169.9354719(15)	1934	Observationally Stable (Note: Believed to undergo α decay to ^{166}Dy or β^{−}β^{−} to ^{170}Yb with a half-life over 4.10×10^{17} years)			0+	0.14910(36)	
^{171}Er	68	103	170.9380374(15)	1938	7.516(2) h	β^{−}	^{171}Tm	5/2−		
^{171m}Er	198.61(9) keV			1990	210(10) ns	IT	^{171}Er	1/2−		
^{172}Er	68	104	171.939363(4)	1956	49.3(5) h	β^{−}	^{172}Tm	0+		
^{172m}Er	1500,9(3) keV			2006	579(62) ns	IT	^{172}Er	(6+)		
^{173}Er	68	105	172.94240(21)#	1972	1.434(17) min	β^{−}	^{173}Tm	(7/2−)		
^{174}Er	68	106	173.94423(32)#	1989	3.2(2) min	β^{−}	^{174}Tm	0+		
^{174m}Er	1111.5(7) keV			2006	3.9(3) s	IT	^{174}Er	8-		
^{175}Er	68	107	174.94777(43)#	1996	1.2(3) min	β^{−}	^{175}Tm	9/2+#		
^{176}Er	68	108	175.94994(43)#	2012	12# s [>300 ns]			0+		
^{177}Er	68	109	176.95399(54)#	2012	8# s [>300 ns]			1/2−#		
^{178}Er	68	110	177.95678(64)#	2012	4# s [>300 ns]			0+		
^{179}Er	68	111	178.96127(54)#	2018	3# s [>550 ns]			3/2−#		
^{180}Er	68	112	179.96438(54)#	2018	2# s [>550 ns]			0+		
^{181}Er	68	113		2026						
^{182}Er	68	114		2026						
This table header & footer:

== See also ==
Daughter products other than erbium

- Isotopes of thulium
- Isotopes of holmium
- Isotopes of dysprosium
