= Isotopes of dysprosium =

Isotopes of dysprosium (_{66}Dy)
Main isotopes			Decay	
Isotope	abundance	half-life (t_{1/2})	mode	product
^{154}Dy	synth	1.40×10^{6} y	α	^{150}Gd
^{156}Dy	0.056%	stable		
^{158}Dy	0.095%	stable		
^{159}Dy	synth	144.4 d	ε	^{159}Tb
^{160}Dy	2.33%	stable		
^{161}Dy	18.9%	stable		
^{162}Dy	25.5%	stable		
^{163}Dy	24.9%	stable		
^{164}Dy	28.3%	stable		
^{165}Dy	synth	2.332 h	β^{−}	^{165}Ho
^{166}Dy	synth	3.40 d	β^{−}	^{166}Ho

Standard atomic weight A_{r}°(Dy)
- 162.500±0.001; 162.50±0.01 (abridged)

Naturally occurring dysprosium (_{66}Dy) is composed of 7 stable isotopes, ^{156}Dy, ^{158}Dy, ^{160}Dy, ^{161}Dy, ^{162}Dy, ^{163}Dy and ^{164}Dy, with ^{164}Dy being the most abundant (28.26% natural abundance). Twenty-nine radioisotopes have been characterized, with the most stable being ^{154}Dy with a half-life of 1.4 million years, ^{159}Dy with a half-life of 144.4 days, and ^{166}Dy with a half-life of 81.6 hours. All of the remaining radioactive isotopes have half-lives that are less than 10 hours, and the majority of these have half-lives that are less than 30 seconds. This element also has 12 meta states, with the most stable being ^{165m}Dy (half-life 1.257 minutes), ^{147m}Dy (half-life 55.7 seconds) and ^{145m}Dy (half-life 13.6 seconds).

The primary decay mode before the most abundant stable isotope, ^{164}Dy, is electron capture to isotopes of terbium, and after beta decay to those of holmium. Dysprosium is the heaviest element to have isotopes that are theoretically stable (163, 164), rather than only ones that are observationally stable and predicted to be radioactive. ^{164}Dy has a surprisingly large thermal neutron absorption and the product isotope ^{165}Dy has found medical use (see below).

== List of isotopes ==
Nuclide (Note: ^{m}Dy – Excited nuclear isomer.)	Z	N	Isotopic mass (Da) (Note: ( ) – Uncertainty (1σ) is given in concise form in parentheses after the corresponding last digits.) (Note: # – Atomic mass marked #: value and uncertainty derived not from purely experimental data, but at least partly from trends from the Mass Surface (TMS).)	Discovery year	Half-life (Note: # – Values marked # are not purely derived from experimental data, but at least partly from trends of neighboring nuclides (TNN).)	Decay mode (Note: Modes of decay: EC: / Electron capture; IT: / Isomeric transition; p: / Proton emission)	Daughter isotope (Note: Bold symbol as daughter – Daughter product is stable.)	Spin and parity (Note: ( ) spin value – Indicates spin with weak assignment arguments.)	Natural abundance (mole fraction)	
Nuclide	Excitation energy			Discovery year	Half-life	Decay mode	Daughter isotope	Spin and parity	Normal proportion	Range of variation
^{138}Dy	66	72	137.96250(54)#	2026	200# ms [>310 ns]			0+		
^{139}Dy	66	73	138.95953(54)#	1999	600(200) ms	β^{+} (~89%)	^{139}Tb	(7/2+)		
^{139}Dy	66	73	138.95953(54)#	1999	600(200) ms	β^{+}, p (~11%)	^{138}Gd	(7/2+)		
^{140}Dy	66	74	139.95402(43)#	2002	700# ms	β^{+}?	^{140}Tb	0+		
^{140}Dy	66	74	139.95402(43)#	2002	700# ms	β^{+}, p?	^{139}Gd	0+		
^{140m}Dy	2166.1(5) keV			2002	7.0(5) μs	IT	^{140}Dy	8−		
^{141}Dy	66	75	140.95128(32)#	1984	0.90(14) s	β^{+}	^{141}Tb	(9/2−)		
^{141}Dy	66	75	140.95128(32)#	1984	0.90(14) s	β^{+}, p?	^{140}Gd	(9/2−)		
^{142}Dy	66	76	141.94619(78)#	1986	2.3(3) s	β^{+} (90%)	^{142}Tb	0+		
^{142}Dy	66	76	141.94619(78)#	1986	2.3(3) s	EC (10%)	^{142}Tb	0+		
^{142}Dy	66	76	141.94619(78)#	1986	2.3(3) s	β^{+}, p (0.06%)	^{141}Gd	0+		
^{143}Dy	66	77	142.943994(14)	1983	5.6(10) s	β^{+}	^{143}Tb	(1/2+)		
^{143}Dy	66	77	142.943994(14)	1983	5.6(10) s	β^{+}, p?	^{142}Gd	(1/2+)		
^{143m1}Dy	310.7(6) keV			2003	3.0(3) s	β^{+}	^{143}Tb	(11/2−)		
^{143m1}Dy	310.7(6) keV			2003	3.0(3) s	β^{+}, p?	^{142}Gd	(11/2−)		
^{143m2}Dy	406.3(8) keV			(2005) (Note: Only published in a conference proceeding and not a refereed journal.)	1.2(3) μs	IT	^{143}Dy	(7/2−)		
^{144}Dy	66	78	143.9392695(77)	1986	9.1(4) s	β^{+}	^{144}Tb	0+		
^{144}Dy	66	78	143.9392695(77)	1986	9.1(4) s	β^{+}, p?	^{143}Gd	0+		
^{145}Dy	66	79	144.9374740(70)	1982	9.5(10) s	β^{+}	^{145}Tb	(1/2+)		
^{145}Dy	66	79	144.9374740(70)	1982	9.5(10) s	β^{+}, p?	^{144}Gd	(1/2+)		
^{145m}Dy	118.2(2) keV			1993	14.1(7) s	β^{+}	^{145}Tb	(11/2−)		
^{145m}Dy	118.2(2) keV			1993	14.1(7) s	β^{+}, p (~50%)	^{144}Gd	(11/2−)		
^{146}Dy	66	80	145.9328445(72)	1981	33.2(7) s	β^{+}	^{146}Tb	0+		
^{146m}Dy	2934.5(4) keV			1982	150(20) ms	IT	^{146}Dy	10+		
^{147}Dy	66	81	146.9310827(95)	1975	67(7) s	β^{+} (99.95%)	^{147}Tb	(1/2+)		
^{147}Dy	66	81	146.9310827(95)	1975	67(7) s	β^{+}, p (0.05%)	^{146}Gd	(1/2+)		
^{147m1}Dy	750.5(4) keV			1975	55.2(5) s	β^{+} (68.9%)	^{147}Tb	(11/2−)		
^{147m1}Dy	750.5(4) keV			1975	55.2(5) s	IT (31.1%)	^{147}Dy	(11/2−)		
^{147m2}Dy	3407.2(8) keV			1985	0.40(1) μs	IT	^{147}Dy	(27/2−)		
^{148}Dy	66	82	147.9271499(94)	1974	3.3(2) min	β^{+}	^{148}Tb	0+		
^{148m}Dy	2919.1(10) keV			1978	471(20) ns	IT	^{148}Dy	10+		
^{149}Dy	66	83	148.9273275(99)	1958	4.20(14) min	β^{+}	^{149}Tb	7/2−		
^{149m}Dy	2661.1(4) keV			1976	490(15) ms	IT (99.3%)	^{149}Dy	27/2−		
^{149m}Dy	2661.1(4) keV			1976	490(15) ms	β^{+} (0.7%)	^{149}Tb	27/2−		
^{150}Dy	66	84	149.9255931(46)	1958	7.17(5) min	β^{+} (66.4%)	^{150}Tb	0+		
^{150}Dy	66	84	149.9255931(46)	1958	7.17(5) min	α (33.6%)	^{146}Gd	0+		
^{151}Dy	66	85	150.9261913(35)	1958	17.9(3) min	β^{+} (94.4%)	^{151}Tb	7/2−		
^{151}Dy	66	85	150.9261913(35)	1958	17.9(3) min	α (5.6%)	^{147}Gd	7/2−		
^{152}Dy	66	86	151.9247253(49)	1958	2.38(2) h	EC (99.90%)	^{152}Tb	0+		
^{152}Dy	66	86	151.9247253(49)	1958	2.38(2) h	α (0.100%)	^{148}Gd	0+		
^{153}Dy	66	87	152.9257717(43)	1958	6.4(1) h	β^{+} (99.99%)	^{153}Tb	7/2−		
^{153}Dy	66	87	152.9257717(43)	1958	6.4(1) h	α (0.0094%)	^{149}Gd	7/2−		
^{154}Dy	66	88	153.9244289(80)	1961	1.40(8)×10^{6} y	α (Note: Theorized to also undergo β^{+}β^{+} decay to ^{154}Gd)	^{150}Gd	0+		
^{155}Dy	66	89	154.925758(10)	1958	9.9(2) h	β^{+}	^{155}Tb	3/2−		
^{155m}Dy	234.33(3) keV			1970	6(1) μs	IT	^{155}Dy	11/2−		
^{156}Dy	66	90	155.9242836(11)	1948	Observationally Stable (Note: Believed to undergo α decay to ^{152}Gd with a half-life over 10^{18} years or β^{+}β^{+} decay to ^{156}Gd)			0+	5.6(3)×10^{−4}	
^{157}Dy	66	91	156.9254696(55)	1953	8.14(4) h	β^{+}	^{157}Tb	3/2−		
^{157m1}Dy	161.99(3) keV			1974	1.3(2) μs	IT	^{157}Dy	9/2+		
^{157m2}Dy	199.38(7) keV			1970	21.6(16) ms	IT	^{157}Dy	11/2−		
^{158}Dy	66	92	157.9244148(25)	1938	Observationally Stable (Note: Believed to undergo α decay to ^{154}Gd or β^{+}β^{+} decay to ^{158}Gd)			0+	9.5(3)×10^{−4}	
^{159}Dy	66	93	158.9257459(15)	1951	144.4(2) d	EC	^{159}Tb	3/2−		
^{159m}Dy	352.77(14) keV			1965	122(3) μs	IT	^{159}Dy	11/2−		
^{160}Dy	66	94	159.92520358(75)	1938	Observationally Stable (Note: Believed to undergo α decay to ^{156}Gd)			0+	0.02329(18)	
^{161}Dy (Note: Fission product)	66	95	160.92693943(75)	1934	Observationally Stable (Note: Believed to undergo α decay to ^{157}Gd)			5/2+	0.18889(42)	
^{161m}Dy	485.56(16) keV			2012	0.76(17) μs	IT	^{161}Dy	11/2−		
^{162}Dy	66	96	161.92680451(75)	1934	Observationally Stable (Note: Believed to undergo α decay to ^{158}Gd)			0+	0.25475(36)	
^{162m}Dy	2188.1(3) keV			2011	8.3(3) μs	IT	^{162}Dy	8+		
^{163}Dy	66	97	162.92873722(74)	1934	Stable (Note: Can undergo bound-state β^{−} decay to ^{163}Ho^{66+} with a half-life of 47 days when fully ionized)			5/2−	0.24896(42)	
^{164}Dy (Note: Heaviest theoretically stable nuclide)	66	98	163.92918082(75)	1934	Stable			0+	0.28260(54)	
^{165}Dy	66	99	164.93170940(75)	1935	2.332(4) h	β^{−}	^{165}Ho	7/2+		
^{165m}Dy	108.1552(13) keV			1960	1.257(6) min	IT (97.76%)	^{165}Dy	1/2−		
^{165m}Dy	108.1552(13) keV			1960	1.257(6) min	β^{−} (2.24%)	^{165}Ho	1/2−		
^{166}Dy	66	100	165.93281281(86)	1949	81.6(1) h	β^{−}	^{166}Ho	0+		
^{167}Dy	66	101	166.9356824(43)	1960	6.20(8) min	β^{−}	^{167}Ho	(1/2−)		
^{168}Dy	66	102	167.93713(15)	1982	8.7(3) min	β^{−}	^{168}Ho	0+		
^{168m}Dy	1378.2(6) keV			2019	0.57(7) μs	IT	^{168}Dy	(4−)		
^{169}Dy	66	103	168.94032(32)	1990	39(8) s	β^{−}	^{169}Ho	(5/2)−		
^{169m}Dy	166.1(5) keV			2019	1.26(17) μs	IT	^{169}Dy	(1/2−)		
^{170}Dy	66	104	169.94234(22)#	2010	54.9(80) s	β^{−}	^{170}Ho	0+		
^{170m}Dy	1643.8(3) keV			2016	0.99(4) μs	IT	^{170}Dy	(6+)		
^{171}Dy	66	105	170.94631(22)#	2012	4.07(40) s	β^{−}	^{171}Ho	7/2−#		
^{172}Dy	66	106	171.94873(32)#	2012	3.4(2) s	β^{−}	^{172}Ho	0+		
^{172m}Dy	1278(1) keV			2016	710(50) ms	IT (81%)	^{172}Dy	(8−)		
^{172m}Dy	1278(1) keV			2016	710(50) ms	β^{−} (19%)	^{172}Ho	(8−)		
^{173}Dy	66	107	172.95304(43)#	2012	1.43(20) s	β^{−}	^{173}Ho	9/2+#		
^{173}Dy	66	107	172.95304(43)#	2012	1.43(20) s	β^{−}, n?	^{172}Ho	9/2+#		
^{174}Dy	66	108	173.95585(54)#	2012	1# s [>300 ns]	β^{−}?	^{174}Ho	0+		
^{174}Dy	66	108	173.95585(54)#	2012	1# s [>300 ns]	β^{−}, n?	^{173}Ho	0+		
^{175}Dy	66	109	174.96057(54)#	2018	390# ms [>550 ns]	β^{−}?	^{175}Ho	1/2-#		
^{175}Dy	66	109	174.96057(54)#	2018	390# ms [>550 ns]	β^{−}, n?	^{174}Ho	1/2-#		
^{176}Dy	66	110	175.96392(54)#	2018	440# ms [>550 ns]	β^{−}?	^{176}Ho	0+		
^{176}Dy	66	110	175.96392(54)#	2018	440# ms [>550 ns]	β^{−}, n?	^{175}Ho	0+		
This table header & footer:

== Dysprosium-165 ==
The radioactive isotope ^{165}Dy, with a half-life of 2.332 hours, has radiopharmaceutical uses in radiation synovectomy of the knee. It had been previously performed with colloidal-sized particles containing longer-lived isotopes such as ^{198}Au and ^{90}Y. The major problem with the usage of those isotopes was radiation leakage out of the knee. ^{165}Dy, with its shorter half-life and thus shorter period of potential radiation leakage, is more suitable for the procedure.

== See also ==
Daughter products other than dysprosium

- Isotopes of holmium
- Isotopes of terbium
- Isotopes of gadolinium
