= Isotopes of europium =

Isotopes of europium (_{63}Eu)
Main isotopes			Decay	
Isotope	abundance	half-life (t_{1/2})	mode	product
^{150}Eu	synth	36.9 y	β^{+}	^{150}Sm
^{151}Eu	47.8%	4.6×10^{18} y	α	^{147}Pm
^{152}Eu	synth	13.517 y	β^{+}	^{152}Sm
^{152}Eu	synth	13.517 y	β^{−}	^{152}Gd
^{153}Eu	52.2%	stable		
^{154}Eu	synth	8.592 y	β^{−}	^{154}Gd
^{154}Eu	synth	8.592 y	ε	^{154}Sm
^{155}Eu	synth	4.742 y	β^{−}	^{155}Gd

Standard atomic weight A_{r}°(Eu)
- 151.964±0.001; 151.96±0.01 (abridged)

Naturally occurring europium (_{63}Eu) is composed of two isotopes, ^{151}Eu and ^{153}Eu, with ^{153}Eu being the more abundant (52.2% natural abundance). While ^{153}Eu is observationally stable, ^{151}Eu was found in 2007 to be unstable and undergo alpha decay; its measured half-life of 4.6 × 10^{18} years corresponds to 1 alpha decay per two minutes per kilogram of natural europium, so for practical purposes it can be considered stable. Besides the natural radioisotope ^{151}Eu, artificial radioisotopes from ^{130}Eu to ^{170}Eu have been made, with the most stable being ^{150}Eu with a half-life of 36.9 years, ^{152}Eu with a half-life of 13.517 years, ^{154}Eu with a half-life of 8.592 years, and ^{155}Eu with a half-life of 4.742 years. All the others have half-lives shorter than 100 days, with the majority shorter than 3 minutes.

This element also has 27 metastable isomers, with the most stable being ^{150m}Eu (12.8 hours), ^{152m1}Eu (9.3116 hours) and ^{152m5}Eu (96 minutes). The primary decay mode for isotopes lighter than ^{153}Eu is electron capture to samarium isotopes, and the primary mode for heavier isotopes is beta minus decay to gadolinium isotopes. ^{152}Eu and ^{154}Eu can decay either way, as can ^{150m}Eu (meta state only).

== List of isotopes ==
Nuclide (Note: ^{m}Eu – Excited nuclear isomer.)	Z	N	Isotopic mass (Da) (Note: ( ) – Uncertainty (1σ) is given in concise form in parentheses after the corresponding last digits.) (Note: # – Atomic mass marked #: value and uncertainty derived not from purely experimental data, but at least partly from trends from the Mass Surface (TMS).)	Discovery year	Half-life (Note: Bold half-life – nearly stable, half-life longer than age of universe.) (Note: # – Values marked # are not purely derived from experimental data, but at least partly from trends of neighboring nuclides (TNN).)	Decay mode (Note: Modes of decay: α: / Alpha decay; β^{+}: / Positron emission; EC: / Electron capture; β^{−}: / Beta decay; IT: / Isomeric transition; p: / Proton emission)	Daughter isotope (Note: Bold italics symbol as daughter – Daughter product is nearly stable.) (Note: Bold symbol as daughter – Daughter product is stable.)	Spin and parity (Note: ( ) spin value – Indicates spin with weak assignment arguments.)	Natural abundance (mole fraction)	
Nuclide	Excitation energy			Discovery year	Half-life	Decay mode	Daughter isotope	Spin and parity	Normal proportion	Range of variation
^{130}Eu	63	67	129.96402(58)#	2004	1.0(4) ms	p	^{129}Sm	(1+)		
^{131}Eu	63	68	130.95763(43)#	1998	17.8(19) ms	p (89%)	^{130}Sm	3/2+		
^{131}Eu	63	68	130.95763(43)#	1998	17.8(19) ms	β^{+} (?%)	^{131}Sm	3/2+		
^{131}Eu	63	68	130.95763(43)#	1998	17.8(19) ms	β^{+}, p (?%)	^{130}Pm	3/2+		
^{132}Eu	63	69	131.95470(43)#	2026	100# ms [>310 ns]			1+#		
^{133}Eu	63	70	132.94929(32)#	2026	200# ms [>310 ns]			5/2+#		
^{134}Eu	63	71	133.94654(32)#	1989	0.5(2) s	β^{+}	^{134}Sm			
^{134}Eu	63	71	133.94654(32)#	1989	0.5(2) s	β^{+}, p (?%)	^{133}Pm			
^{135}Eu	63	72	134.94187(21)#	1989	1.5(2) s	β^{+}	^{135}Sm	5/2+#		
^{136}Eu	63	73	135.93962(21)#	1987	3.3(3) s	β^{+} (99.91%)	^{136}Sm	6+#		
^{136}Eu	63	73	135.93962(21)#	1987	3.3(3) s	β^{+}, p (0.09%)	^{135}Pm	6+#		
^{136m}Eu (Note: Order of ground state and isomer is uncertain.)	100(100)# keV			1989	3.8(3) s	β^{+} (99.91%)	^{136}Sm	1+#		
^{136m}Eu	100(100)# keV			1989	3.8(3) s	β^{+}, p (0.09%)	^{135}Pm	1+#		
^{137}Eu	63	74	136.9354307(47)	1982	8.4(5) s	β^{+}	^{137}Sm	5/2+#		
^{138}Eu	63	75	137.933709(30)	1982	5# s			2−#		
^{138m}Eu	100(50)# keV			---- (Note: Only the 12.1s half-life has been observed, not the 5#s.)	12.1(6) s	β^{+}	^{138}Sm	7−#		
^{139}Eu	63	76	138.929792(14)	1975	17.9(6) s	β^{+}	^{139}Sm	(11/2)−		
^{139m}Eu	148.3(3) keV			2011	10(2) μs	IT	^{139}Eu	(7/2+)		
^{140}Eu	63	77	139.928088(55)	1982	1.51(2) s	β^{+} (95.1%)	^{140}Sm	1+		
^{140}Eu	63	77	139.928088(55)	1982	1.51(2) s	EC (4.9%)	^{140}Sm	1+		
^{140m1}Eu	210(14) keV			1991	125(2) ms	IT (>99%)	^{140}Eu	(5−)		
^{140m1}Eu	210(14) keV			1991	125(2) ms	β^{+} (>1%)	^{140}Sm	(5−)		
^{140m2}Eu	669(14) keV			2002	299.8(21) ns	IT	^{140}Eu	(8+)		
^{141}Eu	63	78	140.924932(14)	1977	40.7(7) s	β^{+}	^{141}Sm	5/2+		
^{141m}Eu	96.45(7) keV			1977	2.7(3) s	IT (86%)	^{141}Eu	11/2−		
^{141m}Eu	96.45(7) keV			1977	2.7(3) s	β^{+} (14%)	^{141}Sm	11/2−		
^{142}Eu	63	79	141.923447(32)	1966	2.36(10) s	β^{+} (89.9%)	^{142}Sm	1+		
^{142}Eu	63	79	141.923447(32)	1966	2.36(10) s	EC (11.1%)	^{142}Sm	1+		
^{142m}Eu	450(30) keV			1975	1.223(8) min	β^{+}	^{142}Sm	8−		
^{143}Eu	63	80	142.920299(12)	1965	2.59(2) min	β^{+}	^{143}Sm	5/2+		
^{143m}Eu	389.51(4) keV			1976	50.0(5) μs	IT	^{143}Eu	11/2−		
^{144}Eu	63	81	143.918819(12)	1965	10.2(1) s	β^{+}	^{144}Sm	1+		
^{144m}Eu	1127.6(6) keV			1976	1.0(1) μs	IT	^{144}Eu	8−		
^{145}Eu	63	82	144.9162727(33)	1951	5.93(4) d	β^{+}	^{145}Sm	5/2+		
^{145m}Eu	716.0(3) keV			1975	490(30) ns	IT	^{145}Eu	11/2−		
^{146}Eu	63	83	145.9172109(65)	1957	4.61(3) d	β^{+}	^{146}Sm	4−		
^{146m}Eu	666.33(11) keV			1962	235(3) μs	IT	^{146}Eu	9+		
^{147}Eu	63	84	146.9167524(28)	1951	24.1(6) d	β^{+}	^{147}Sm	5/2+		
^{147}Eu	63	84	146.9167524(28)	1951	24.1(6) d	α (0.0022%)	^{143}Pm	5/2+		
^{147m}Eu	625.27(5) keV			1960	765(15) ns	IT	^{147}Eu	11/2−		
^{148}Eu	63	85	147.918091(11)	1951	54.5(5) d	β^{+}	^{148}Sm	5−		
^{148}Eu	63	85	147.918091(11)	1951	54.5(5) d	α (9.4×10^{−7}%)	^{144}Pm	5−		
^{148m}Eu	720.4(3) keV			1980	162(8) ns	IT	^{148}Eu	9+		
^{149}Eu	63	86	148.9179369(42)	1959	93.1(4) d	EC	^{149}Sm	5/2+		
^{149m}Eu	496.386(2) keV			1960	2.45(5) μs	IT	^{149}Eu	11/2−		
^{150}Eu	63	87	149.9197071(67)	1950	36.9(9) y	β^{+}	^{150}Sm	5−		
^{150m}Eu	41.7(10) keV			1961	12.8(1) h	β^{−} (89%)	^{150}Gd	0−		
^{150m}Eu	41.7(10) keV			1961	12.8(1) h	β^{+} (11%)	^{150}Sm	0−		
^{150m}Eu	41.7(10) keV			1961	12.8(1) h	IT (<5×10^{−8}%)	^{150}Eu	0−		
^{151}Eu (Note: Fission product) (Note: Primordial radionuclide)	63	88	150.9198566(13)	1933	4.6(12)×10^{18} y	α	^{147}Pm	5/2+	0.4781(6)	
^{151m}Eu	196.245(10) keV			1958	58.9(5) μs	IT	^{151}Eu	11/2−		
^{152}Eu	63	89	151.9217510(13)	1938	13.517(6) y	β^{+} (72.08%)	^{152}Sm	3−		
^{152}Eu	63	89	151.9217510(13)	1938	13.517(6) y	β^{−} (27.92%)	^{152}Gd	3−		
^{152m1}Eu	45.5998(4) keV			1947	9.3116(13) h	β^{−} (73%)	^{152}Gd	0−		
^{152m1}Eu	45.5998(4) keV			1947	9.3116(13) h	β^{+} (27%)	^{152}Sm	0−		
^{152m2}Eu	65.2969(4) keV			1978	940(80) ns	IT	^{152}Eu	1−		
^{152m3}Eu	78.2331(4) keV			1978	165(10) ns	IT	^{152}Eu	1+		
^{152m4}Eu	89.8496(4) keV			1965	384(10) ns	IT	^{152}Eu	4+		
^{152m5}Eu	147.86(10) keV			1963	95.8(4) min	IT	^{152}Eu	8−		
^{153}Eu	63	90	152.9212368(13)	1933	Observationally Stable (Note: Believed to undergo α decay to ^{149}Pm with a half-life over 5.5×10^{17} years)			5/2+	0.5219(6)	
^{153m}Eu	1771.0(4) keV			2000	475(10) ns	IT	^{153}Eu	19/2−		
^{154}Eu	63	91	153.9229857(13)	1947	8.592(3) y	β^{−} (99.98%)	^{154}Gd	3−		
^{154}Eu	63	91	153.9229857(13)	1947	8.592(3) y	EC (0.02%)	^{154}Sm	3−		
^{154m1}Eu	68.1702(4) keV			1965	2.2(1) μs	IT	^{154}Eu	2+		
^{154m2}Eu	145.3(3) keV			1975	46.3(4) min	IT	^{154}Eu	(8−)		
^{155}Eu	63	92	154.9228998(13)	1951	4.742(8) y	β^{−}	^{155}Gd	5/2+		
^{156}Eu	63	93	155.9247630(38)	1951	15.19(8) d	β^{−}	^{156}Gd	0+		
^{157}Eu	63	94	156.9254326(45)	1951	15.18(3) h	β^{−}	^{157}Gd	5/2+		
^{158}Eu	63	95	157.9277822(22)	1951	45.9(2) min	β^{−}	^{158}Gd	1−		
^{159}Eu	63	96	158.9290995(46)	1961	18.1(1) min	β^{−}	^{159}Gd	5/2+		
^{160}Eu	63	97	159.93183698(97)	1973	42.6(5) s	β^{−}	^{160}Gd	(5−)		
^{160m}Eu	93.0(12) keV			2018	30.8(5) s	IT	^{160}Eu	(1−)		
^{161}Eu	63	98	160.933664(11)	1986	26.2(23) s	β^{−}	^{161}Gd	5/2+#		
^{162}Eu	63	99	161.9369583(14)	1987	~10 s	β^{−}	^{162}Gd	1+#		
^{162m}Eu	158.0(17) keV			2018	15.0(5) s	IT	^{162}Eu	(6+)		
^{163}Eu	63	100	162.93926551(97)	2007	7.7(4) s	β^{−}	^{163}Gd	5/2+#		
^{163m}Eu	964.5(5) keV			2017	911(24) ns	IT	^{163}Eu	(13/2−)		
^{164}Eu	63	101	163.9428529(22)	2007	4.16(19) s	β^{−}	^{164}Gd	3−#		
^{165}Eu	63	102	164.9455401(56)	2007	2.163+0.139 −0.120 s	β^{−}	^{165}Gd	5/2+#		
^{166}Eu	63	103	165.94981(11)#	2012	1.277+0.100 −0.145 s	β^{−} (99.37%)	^{166}Gd	0−#		
^{166}Eu	63	103	165.94981(11)#	2012	1.277+0.100 −0.145 s	β^{−}, n (0.63%)	^{165}Gd	0−#		
^{167}Eu	63	104	166.95301(43)#	2012	852+76 −54 ms	β^{−} (98.05%)	^{167}Gd	5/2+#		
^{167}Eu	63	104	166.95301(43)#	2012	852+76 −54 ms	β^{−}, n (1.95%)	^{166}Gd	5/2+#		
^{168}Eu	63	105	167.95786(43)#	2012	440+48 −47 ms	β^{−} (96.05%)	^{168}Gd	6−#		
^{168}Eu	63	105	167.95786(43)#	2012	440+48 −47 ms	β^{−}, n (3.95%)	^{167}Gd	6−#		
^{169}Eu	63	106	168.96172(54)#	2018	389+92 −88 ms	β^{−} (85.38%)	^{169}Gd	5/2+#		
^{169}Eu	63	106	168.96172(54)#	2018	389+92 −88 ms	β^{−}, n (14.62%)	^{168}Gd	5/2+#		
^{170}Eu	63	107	169.96687(54)#	2022	197+74 −71 ms	β^{−} (>76%)	^{170}Gd			
^{170}Eu	63	107	169.96687(54)#	2022	197+74 −71 ms	β^{−}, n (<24%)	^{169}Gd			
This table header & footer:

== Europium-155 ==
Medium-lived fission products
Nuclide	t_{1/2}	Yield	Q (Note: Decay energy is split among β, neutrino, and γ if any.)	βγ
	(a)	(%) (Note: Per 65 thermal neutron fissions of ^{235}U and 35 of ^{239}Pu.)	(keV)	
^{155}Eu	4.74	0.0803 (Note: Neutron poison; in thermal reactors, most is destroyed by further neutron capture.)	252	βγ
^{85}Kr	10.73	0.2180 (Note: Less than 1/4 of mass-85 fission products as most bypass ground state: ^{85}Br → ^{85m}Kr → ^{85}Rb.)	687	βγ
^{113m}Cd	13.9	0.0008	316	β
^{90}Sr	28.91	4.505	2826 (Note: Has decay energy 546 keV; its decay product ^{90}Y has decay energy 2.28 MeV with weak gamma branching.)	β
^{137}Cs	30.04	6.337	1176	βγ
^{121m}Sn	43.9	0.00005	390	βγ
^{151}Sm	94.6	0.5314	77	β

Europium-155 is a fission product with a half-life of 4.742 years and has a maximum decay energy of 252 keV. Because of its position on the high-mass end of the yield curve, it has a low fission product yield, about 1 to 2% that of the most abundant fission products.

^{155}Eu's large neutron capture cross section means that most of the small amount produced is destroyed in the course of the nuclear fuel's burnup. Yield, decay energy, and half-life are all far less than that of ^{137}Cs and ^{90}Sr, so ^{155}Eu is not a significant contributor to nuclear waste.

Some ^{155}Eu is also produced by successive neutron captures on ^{153}Eu and ^{154}Eu, whose direct fission yield is extremely small as its mass chain stops at ^{154}Sm. However, the high cross sections, and even higher for 155 than 154, mean that both ^{155}Eu and ^{154}Eu are destroyed faster than they are produced. See the table below for numeric details on this process.

Isotope	Half-life	Relative yield (fission)	Thermal neutron	Resonance integral
Eu-153	Stable	5	350	1500
Eu-154	8.592 years	~0	1500	1600
Eu-155	4.742 years	1	3900	16000

== See also ==
Daughter products other than europium

- Isotopes of gadolinium
- Isotopes of samarium
- Isotopes of promethium
