= Isotopes of gadolinium =

Isotopes of gadolinium (_{64}Gd)
Main isotopes			Decay	
Isotope	abundance	half-life (t_{1/2})	mode	product
^{148}Gd	synth	86.9 y	α	^{144}Sm
^{150}Gd	synth	1.79×10^{6} y	α	^{146}Sm
^{151}Gd	synth	123.9 d	ε	^{151}Eu
^{151}Gd	synth	123.9 d	α	^{147}Sm
^{152}Gd	0.20%	1.08×10^{14} y	α	^{148}Sm
^{153}Gd	synth	240.6 d	ε	^{153}Eu
^{154}Gd	2.18%	stable		
^{155}Gd	14.80%	stable		
^{156}Gd	20.47%	stable		
^{157}Gd	15.65%	stable		
^{158}Gd	24.84%	stable		
^{159}Gd	synth	18.479 h	β^{−}	^{159}Tb
^{160}Gd	21.86%	stable		

Standard atomic weight A_{r}°(Gd)
- 157.249±0.002; 157.25±0.01 (abridged)

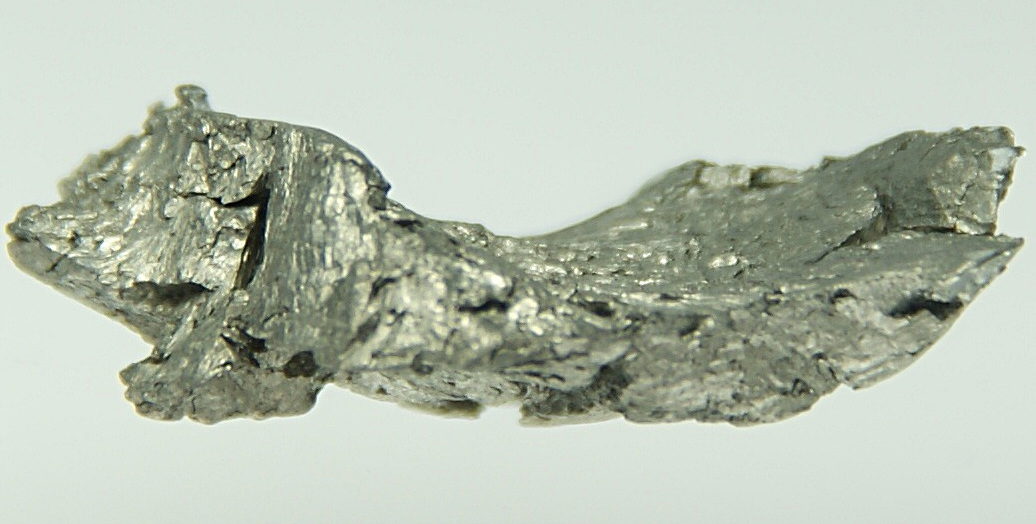
Gadolinium

Naturally occurring gadolinium (_{64}Gd) is composed of six stable isotopes, ^{154}Gd, ^{155}Gd, ^{156}Gd, ^{157}Gd, ^{158}Gd and ^{160}Gd, and one long-lived radioisotope, ^{152}Gd, with ^{158}Gd being the most abundant (24.84% natural abundance). The predicted double beta decay of ^{160}Gd has not been observed.

In all, 32 radioisotopes of gadolinium have been characterized, with the three most stable being alpha emitters: ^{152}Gd (naturally occurring) with a half-life of 1.08×10^{14} years, ^{150}Gd with a half-life of 1.79×10^{6} years, and ^{148}Gd (theoretically not beta-stable) with a half-life of 86.9 years. All of the remaining radioactive isotopes have half-lives less than a year, the majority of these having half-lives less than two minutes. There are also 16 metastable isomers, with the most stable being ^{143m}Gd (t_{1/2} = 110 seconds), ^{145m}Gd (t_{1/2} = 85 seconds) and ^{141m}Gd (t_{1/2} = 24.5 seconds).

The isotopes with atomic masses lower than the most abundant stable isotope, ^{158}Gd, primarily decay by electron capture to isotopes of europium. For higher atomic masses, the primary decay mode is beta decay to isotopes of terbium.

== List of isotopes ==
Nuclide (Note: ^{m}Gd – Excited nuclear isomer.)	Z	N	Isotopic mass (Da) (Note: ( ) – Uncertainty (1σ) is given in concise form in parentheses after the corresponding last digits.) (Note: # – Atomic mass marked #: value and uncertainty derived not from purely experimental data, but at least partly from trends from the Mass Surface (TMS).)	Discovery year	Half-life (Note: Bold half-life – nearly stable, half-life longer than age of universe.) (Note: # – Values marked # are not purely derived from experimental data, but at least partly from trends of neighboring nuclides (TNN).)	Decay mode (Note: Modes of decay: EC: / Electron capture; IT: / Isomeric transition)	Daughter isotope (Note: Bold italics symbol as daughter – Daughter product is nearly stable.) (Note: Bold symbol as daughter – Daughter product is stable.)	Spin and parity (Note: ( ) spin value – Indicates spin with weak assignment arguments.)	Natural abundance (mole fraction)	
Nuclide	Excitation energy			Discovery year	Half-life	Decay mode	Daughter isotope	Spin and parity	Normal proportion	Range of variation
^{133}Gd	64	69	132.96129(54)#	2026	10# ms [>310 ns]			5/2+#		
^{134}Gd	64	70	133.95542(43)#	2026	400# ms [>310 ns]			0+		
^{135}Gd	64	71	134.95250(43)#	1996	1.1(2) s	β^{+} (98%)	^{135}Eu	(5/2+)		
^{135}Gd	64	71	134.95250(43)#	1996	1.1(2) s	β^{+}, p (98%)	^{134}Sm	(5/2+)		
^{136}Gd	64	72	135.94730(32)#	2026	1# s [>310 ns]	β^{+}?	^{136}Eu	0+		
^{136}Gd	64	72	135.94730(32)#	2026	1# s [>310 ns]	β^{+}, p?	^{135}Sm	0+		
^{137}Gd	64	73	136.94502(32)#	1999	2.2(2) s	β^{+}	^{137}Eu	(7/2)+#		
^{137}Gd	64	73	136.94502(32)#	1999	2.2(2) s	β^{+}, p?	^{136}Sm	(7/2)+#		
^{138}Gd	64	74	137.94025(22)#	1985	4.7(9) s	β^{+}	^{138}Eu	0+		
^{138m}Gd	2232.6(11) keV			1997	6.2(0.2) μs	IT	^{138}Gd	(8−)		
^{139}Gd	64	75	138.93813(21)#	1983	5.7(3) s	β^{+}	^{139}Eu	9/2−#		
^{139}Gd	64	75	138.93813(21)#	1983	5.7(3) s	β^{+}, p?	^{138}Sm	9/2−#		
^{139m}Gd (Note: Order of ground state and isomer is uncertain.)	250(150)# keV			1999	4.8(9) s	β^{+}	^{139}Eu	1/2+#		
^{139m}Gd	250(150)# keV			1999	4.8(9) s	β^{+}, p?	^{138}Sm	1/2+#		
^{140}Gd	64	76	139.933674(30)	1985	15.8(4) s	β^{+} (67(8)%)	^{140}Eu	0+		
^{140}Gd	64	76	139.933674(30)	1985	15.8(4) s	EC (33(8)%)	^{140}Eu	0+		
^{141}Gd	64	77	140.932126(21)	1986	14(4) s	β^{+} (99.97%)	^{141}Eu	(1/2+)		
^{141}Gd	64	77	140.932126(21)	1986	14(4) s	β^{+}, p (0.03%)	^{140}Sm	(1/2+)		
^{141m}Gd	377.76(9) keV			1989	24.5(5) s	β^{+} (89%)	^{141}Eu	(11/2−)		
^{141m}Gd	377.76(9) keV			1989	24.5(5) s	IT (11%)	^{141}Gd	(11/2−)		
^{142}Gd	64	78	141.928116(30)	1986	70.2(6) s	EC (52(5)%)	^{142}Eu	0+		
^{142}Gd	64	78	141.928116(30)	1986	70.2(6) s	β^{+} (48(5)%)	^{142}Eu	0+		
^{143}Gd	64	79	142.92675(22)	1975	39(2) s	β^{+}	^{143}Eu	1/2+		
^{143}Gd	64	79	142.92675(22)	1975	39(2) s	β^{+}, p?	^{142}Sm	1/2+		
^{143}Gd	64	79	142.92675(22)	1975	39(2) s	β^{+}, α?	^{139}Pm	1/2+		
^{143m}Gd	152.6(5) keV			1975	110.0(14) s	β^{+}	^{143}Eu	11/2−		
^{143m}Gd	152.6(5) keV			1975	110.0(14) s	β^{+}, p?	^{142}Sm	11/2−		
^{143m}Gd	152.6(5) keV			1975	110.0(14) s	β^{+}, α?	^{139}Pm	11/2−		
^{144}Gd	64	80	143.922963(30)	1968	4.47(6) min	β^{+}	^{144}Eu	0+		
^{144m}Gd	3433.1(5) keV			1978	145(30) ns	IT	^{144}Gd	(10+)		
^{145}Gd	64	81	144.921710(21)	1959	23.0(4) min	β^{+}	^{145}Eu	1/2+		
^{145m}Gd	749.1(2) keV			1969	85(3) s	IT (94.3%)	^{145}Gd	11/2−		
^{145m}Gd	749.1(2) keV			1969	85(3) s	β^{+} (5.7%)	^{145}Eu	11/2−		
^{146}Gd	64	82	145.9183185(44)	1957	48.27(9) d	EC	^{146}Eu	0+		
^{147}Gd	64	83	146.9191010(20)	1957	38.06(12) h	β^{+}	^{147}Eu	7/2−		
^{147m}Gd	8587.8(5) keV			1978	510(20) ns	IT	^{147}Gd	49/2+		
^{148}Gd	64	84	147.9181214(16)	1953	86.9(39) y	α (Note: Theorized to also undergo β^{+}β^{+} decay to ^{148}Sm or EC to ^{148}Eu)	^{144}Sm	0+		
^{149}Gd	64	85	148.9193477(36)	1951	9.28(10) d	β^{+}	^{149}Eu	7/2−		
^{149}Gd	64	85	148.9193477(36)	1951	9.28(10) d	α (4.3×10^{−4}%)	^{145}Sm	7/2−		
^{150}Gd	64	86	149.9186639(65)	1953	1.79(8)×10^{6} y	α (Note: Theorized to also undergo β^{+}β^{+} decay to ^{150}Sm)	^{146}Sm	0+		
^{151}Gd	64	87	150.9203549(32)	1950	123.9(10) d	EC	^{151}Eu	7/2−		
^{151}Gd	64	87	150.9203549(32)	1950	123.9(10) d	α (1.1×10^{−6}%)	^{147}Sm	7/2−		
^{152}Gd (Note: primordial radionuclide)	64	88	151.9197984(11)	1938	1.08(8)×10^{14} y	α (Note: Theorized to also undergo β^{+}β^{+} decay to ^{152}Sm)	^{148}Sm	0+	0.0020(1)	
^{153}Gd	64	89	152.9217569(11)	1947	240.6(7) d	EC	^{153}Eu	3/2−		
^{153m1}Gd	95.1737(8) keV			1979	3.5(4) μs	IT	^{153}Gd	9/2+		
^{153m2}Gd	171.188(4) keV			1967	76.0(14) μs	IT	^{153}Gd	(11/2−)		
^{154}Gd (Note: Fission product)	64	90	153.9208730(11)	1938	Observationally Stable (Note: Believed to undergo α decay to ^{150}Sm)			0+	0.0218(2)	
^{155}Gd	64	91	154.9226294(11)	1933	Observationally Stable (Note: Believed to undergo α decay to ^{151}Sm)			3/2−	0.1480(9)	
^{155m}Gd	121.10(19) keV			1967	31.97(27) ms	IT	^{155}Gd	11/2−		
^{156}Gd	64	92	155.9221301(11)	1933	Stable			0+	0.2047(3)	
^{156m}Gd	2137.60(5) keV			1969	1.3(1) μs	IT	^{156}Gd	7-		
^{157}Gd	64	93	156.9239674(10)	1933	Stable			3/2−	0.1565(4)	
^{157m1}Gd	63.916(5) keV			1964	460(40) ns	IT	^{157}Gd	5/2+		
^{157m2}Gd	426.539(23) keV			1967	18.5(23) μs	IT	^{157}Gd	11/2−		
^{158}Gd	64	94	157.9241112(10)	1933	Stable			0+	0.2484(8)	
^{159}Gd	64	95	158.9263958(11)	1949	18.479(4) h	β^{−}	^{159}Tb	3/2−		
^{160}Gd	64	96	159.9270612(12)	1933	Observationally Stable (Note: Believed to undergo β^{−}β^{−} decay to ^{160}Dy with a half-life over 3.1×10^{19} years)			0+	0.2186(3)	
^{161}Gd	64	97	160.9296763(16)	1949	3.646(3) min	β^{−}	^{161}Tb	5/2−		
^{162}Gd	64	98	161.9309918(43)	1967	8.4(2) min	β^{−}	^{162}Tb	0+		
^{162m}Gd	1448.6 keV			2021	99(3) μs	IT	^{162}Gd	(6−)		
^{163}Gd	64	99	162.93409664(86)	1982	68(3) s	β^{−}	^{163}Tb	7/2+		
^{163m}Gd	138.22(20) keV			2014	23.5(10) s	IT?	^{163}Gd	1/2−		
^{163m}Gd	138.22(20) keV			2014	23.5(10) s	β^{−}	^{163}Tb	1/2−		
^{164}Gd	64	100	163.9359162(11)	1988	45(3) s	β^{−}	^{164}Tb	0+		
^{164m}Gd	1095.8(4) keV			2017	589(18) ns	IT	^{164}Gd	(4−)		
^{165}Gd	64	101	164.9393171(14)	1998	11.6(10) s	β^{−}	^{165}Tb	1/2−#		
^{166}Gd	64	102	165.9416304(17)	2005	5.1(8) s	β^{−}	^{166}Tb	0+		
^{166m}Gd	1601.5(11) keV			2014	950(60) ns	IT	^{166}Gd	(6−)		
^{167}Gd	64	103	166.9454900(56)	2012	4.2(3) s	β^{−}	^{167}Tb	5/2−#		
^{168}Gd	64	104	167.94831(32)#	2012	3.03(16) s	β^{−}	^{168}Tb	0+		
^{169}Gd	64	105	168.95288(43)#	2012	750(210) ms	β^{−}	^{169}Tb	7/2−#		
^{169}Gd	64	105	168.95288(43)#	2012	750(210) ms	β^{−}, n? (<0.7%)	^{168}Tb	7/2−#		
^{170}Gd	64	106	169.95615(54)#	2012	675+94 −75 ms	β^{−}	^{170}Tb	0+		
^{170}Gd	64	106	169.95615(54)#	2012	675+94 −75 ms	β^{−}, n? (<3%)	^{169}Tb	0+		
^{171}Gd	64	107	170.96113(54)#	2018	392+145 −136 ms	β^{−}	^{171}Tb	9/2+#		
^{171}Gd	64	107	170.96113(54)#	2018	392+145 −136 ms	β^{−}, n? (<10%)	^{170}Tb	9/2+#		
^{172}Gd	64	108	171.96461(32)#	2022	163+113 −99 ms	β^{−}	^{172}Tb	0+#		
^{172}Gd	64	108	171.96461(32)#	2022	163+113 −99 ms	β^{−}, n? (<50%)	^{171}Tb	0+#		
^{173}Gd	64	109		2026	>310 ns					
This table header & footer:

== Gadolinium-148 ==
As a pure alpha emitter with a half-life of 86.9±3.9 years (the same as plutonium-238 within error), gadolinium-148 would be ideal for radioisotope thermoelectric generators. However, gadolinium-148 cannot be economically synthesized in sufficient quantities to power a RTG.

== Gadolinium-153 ==
Gadolinium-153 has a half-life of 240.6 days and emits gamma radiation with strong peaks at 41 keV and 102 keV. It is used as a gamma ray source for X-ray absorptiometry and fluorescence, for bone density gauges for osteoporosis screening, and for radiometric profiling in the Lixiscope portable x-ray imaging system, also known as the Lixi Profiler. In nuclear medicine, it serves to calibrate the equipment needed like single-photon emission computed tomography systems (SPECT) to make x-rays. It ensures that the machines work correctly to produce images of radioisotope distribution inside the patient. This isotope is produced in a nuclear reactor from europium or enriched gadolinium. It can also detect the loss of calcium in the hip and back bones, allowing the ability to diagnose osteoporosis.

== See also ==
Daughter products other than gadolinium

- Isotopes of terbium
- Isotopes of europium
- Isotopes of samarium
- Isotopes of promethium
