= Table of nuclides (segmented, narrow) =

Periodic table for looking up element numbers (atomic number)

The isotope tables given below show all of the known isotopes of the chemical elements, arranged with increasing atomic number from left to right and increasing neutron number from top to bottom.

Half lives are indicated by the color of each isotope's cell (see color chart in each section). Colored borders indicate half lives of the most stable nuclear isomer states.

The data for these tables came from Brookhaven National Laboratory which has an interactive Table of Nuclides with data on ~3000 nuclides.

== Isotopes for elements 0-14 ==
← Previous | Next →Go to Unitized table (all elements)Go to Periodic table

Half-lives (example: Gd)
^{145}Gd	< 1 day
^{149}Gd	1–10 days
^{146}Gd	10–100 days
^{153}Gd	100 days–10 a
^{148}Gd	10–10,000 a
^{150}Gd	10 ka–700 Ma
^{152}Gd	> 700 Ma
^{158}Gd	Stable

Z →	0	1	2	3											
n ↓	n	H	He	Li	4	5									
0		^{1}H			Be	B	6	7							
1	^{1}n	^{2}H	^{3}He	^{4}Li			C	N	8						
2		^{3}H	^{4}He	^{5}Li	^{6}Be	^{7}B	^{8}C	^{9}N	O	9					
3		^{4}H	^{5}He	^{6}Li	^{7}Be	^{8}B	^{9}C	^{10}N	^{11}O	F	10				
4		^{5}H	^{6}He	^{7}Li	^{8}Be	^{9}B	^{10}C	^{11}N	^{12}O	^{13}F	Ne	11	12		
	5	^{6}H	^{7}He	^{8}Li	^{9}Be	^{10}B	^{11}C	^{12}N	^{13}O	^{14}F	^{15}Ne	Na	Mg	13	
	6	^{7}H	^{8}He	^{9}Li	^{10}Be	^{11}B	^{12}C	^{13}N	^{14}O	^{15}F	^{16}Ne	^{17}Na	^{18}Mg	Al	14
		7	^{9}He	^{10}Li	^{11}Be	^{12}B	^{13}C	^{14}N	^{15}O	^{16}F	^{17}Ne	^{18}Na	^{19}Mg	^{20}Al	Si
		8	^{10}He	^{11}Li	^{12}Be	^{13}B	^{14}C	^{15}N	^{16}O	^{17}F	^{18}Ne	^{19}Na	^{20}Mg	^{21}Al	^{22}Si
			9	^{12}Li	^{13}Be	^{14}B	^{15}C	^{16}N	^{17}O	^{18}F	^{19}Ne	^{20}Na	^{21}Mg	^{22}Al	^{23}Si
			10	^{13}Li	^{14}Be	^{15}B	^{16}C	^{17}N	^{18}O	^{19}F	^{20}Ne	^{21}Na	^{22}Mg	^{23}Al	^{24}Si
				11	^{15}Be	^{16}B	^{17}C	^{18}N	^{19}O	^{20}F	^{21}Ne	^{22}Na	^{23}Mg	^{24}Al	^{25}Si
				12	^{16}Be	^{17}B	^{18}C	^{19}N	^{20}O	^{21}F	^{22}Ne	^{23}Na	^{24}Mg	^{25}Al	^{26}Si
					13	^{18}B	^{19}C	^{20}N	^{21}O	^{22}F	^{23}Ne	^{24}Na	^{25}Mg	^{26}Al	^{27}Si
					14	^{19}B	^{20}C	^{21}N	^{22}O	^{23}F	^{24}Ne	^{25}Na	^{26}Mg	^{27}Al	^{28}Si
					15	^{20}B		^{22}N	^{23}O	^{24}F	^{25}Ne	^{26}Na	^{27}Mg	^{28}Al	^{29}Si
					16	^{21}B	^{22}C	^{23}N	^{24}O	^{25}F	^{26}Ne	^{27}Na	^{28}Mg	^{29}Al	^{30}Si
						17			^{25}O	^{26}F	^{27}Ne	^{28}Na	^{29}Mg	^{30}Al	^{31}Si
							18		^{26}O	^{27}F	^{28}Ne	^{29}Na	^{30}Mg	^{31}Al	^{32}Si
								19	^{27}O	^{28}F	^{29}Ne	^{30}Na	^{31}Mg	^{32}Al	^{33}Si
								20	^{28}O	^{29}F	^{30}Ne	^{31}Na	^{32}Mg	^{33}Al	^{34}Si
									21	^{30}F	^{31}Ne	^{32}Na	^{33}Mg	^{34}Al	^{35}Si
									22	^{31}F	^{32}Ne	^{33}Na	^{34}Mg	^{35}Al	^{36}Si
										23		^{34}Na	^{35}Mg	^{36}Al	^{37}Si
										24	^{34}Ne	^{35}Na	^{36}Mg	^{37}Al	^{38}Si
											25		^{37}Mg	^{38}Al	^{39}Si
											26	^{37}Na	^{38}Mg	^{39}Al	^{40}Si
											27			^{40}Al	^{41}Si
											28	^{39}Na	^{40}Mg	^{41}Al	^{42}Si
												29		^{42}Al	^{43}Si
													30	^{43}Al	^{44}Si
														31	^{45}Si

== Isotopes for elements 15-29 ==
← Previous | Next →Go to Unitized table (all elements)Go to Periodic table

Half-lives (example: Gd)
^{145}Gd	< 1 day
^{149}Gd	1–10 days
^{146}Gd	10–100 days
^{153}Gd	100 days–10 a
^{148}Gd	10–10,000 a
^{150}Gd	10 ka–700 Ma
^{152}Gd	> 700 Ma
^{158}Gd	Stable

Z →	15														
n ↓	P	16													
9		S	17	18											
10			Cl	Ar	19										
11	^{26}P	^{27}S	^{28}Cl	^{29}Ar	K	20									
12	^{27}P	^{28}S	^{29}Cl	^{30}Ar	^{31}K	Ca	21								
13	^{28}P	^{29}S	^{30}Cl	^{31}Ar			Sc	22							
14	^{29}P	^{30}S	^{31}Cl	^{32}Ar	^{33}K			Ti	23						
15	^{30}P	^{31}S	^{32}Cl	^{33}Ar	^{34}K	^{35}Ca			V	24					
16	^{31}P	^{32}S	^{33}Cl	^{34}Ar	^{35}K	^{36}Ca	^{37}Sc			Cr	25				
17	^{32}P	^{33}S	^{34}Cl	^{35}Ar	^{36}K	^{37}Ca	^{38}Sc	^{39}Ti			Mn	26			
18	^{33}P	^{34}S	^{35}Cl	^{36}Ar	^{37}K	^{38}Ca	^{39}Sc	^{40}Ti		^{42}Cr		Fe	27	28	
19	^{34}P	^{35}S	^{36}Cl	^{37}Ar	^{38}K	^{39}Ca	^{40}Sc	^{41}Ti		^{43}Cr		^{45}Fe	Co	Ni	
20	^{35}P	^{36}S	^{37}Cl	^{38}Ar	^{39}K	^{40}Ca	^{41}Sc	^{42}Ti	^{43}V	^{44}Cr		^{46}Fe		^{48}Ni	
21	^{36}P	^{37}S	^{38}Cl	^{39}Ar	^{40}K	^{41}Ca	^{42}Sc	^{43}Ti	^{44}V	^{45}Cr	^{46}Mn	^{47}Fe		^{49}Ni	29
22	^{37}P	^{38}S	^{39}Cl	^{40}Ar	^{41}K	^{42}Ca	^{43}Sc	^{44}Ti	^{45}V	^{46}Cr	^{47}Mn	^{48}Fe		^{50}Ni	Cu
23	^{38}P	^{39}S	^{40}Cl	^{41}Ar	^{42}K	^{43}Ca	^{44}Sc	^{45}Ti	^{46}V	^{47}Cr	^{48}Mn	^{49}Fe	^{50}Co	^{51}Ni	
24	^{39}P	^{40}S	^{41}Cl	^{42}Ar	^{43}K	^{44}Ca	^{45}Sc	^{46}Ti	^{47}V	^{48}Cr	^{49}Mn	^{50}Fe	^{51}Co	^{52}Ni	
25	^{40}P	^{41}S	^{42}Cl	^{43}Ar	^{44}K	^{45}Ca	^{46}Sc	^{47}Ti	^{48}V	^{49}Cr	^{50}Mn	^{51}Fe	^{52}Co	^{53}Ni	
26	^{41}P	^{42}S	^{43}Cl	^{44}Ar	^{45}K	^{46}Ca	^{47}Sc	^{48}Ti	^{49}V	^{50}Cr	^{51}Mn	^{52}Fe	^{53}Co	^{54}Ni	^{55}Cu
27	^{42}P	^{43}S	^{44}Cl	^{45}Ar	^{46}K	^{47}Ca	^{48}Sc	^{49}Ti	^{50}V	^{51}Cr	^{52}Mn	^{53}Fe	^{54}Co	^{55}Ni	^{56}Cu
28	^{43}P	^{44}S	^{45}Cl	^{46}Ar	^{47}K	^{48}Ca	^{49}Sc	^{50}Ti	^{51}V	^{52}Cr	^{53}Mn	^{54}Fe	^{55}Co	^{56}Ni	^{57}Cu
29	^{44}P	^{45}S	^{46}Cl	^{47}Ar	^{48}K	^{49}Ca	^{50}Sc	^{51}Ti	^{52}V	^{53}Cr	^{54}Mn	^{55}Fe	^{56}Co	^{57}Ni	^{58}Cu
30	^{45}P	^{46}S	^{47}Cl	^{48}Ar	^{49}K	^{50}Ca	^{51}Sc	^{52}Ti	^{53}V	^{54}Cr	^{55}Mn	^{56}Fe	^{57}Co	^{58}Ni	^{59}Cu
31	^{46}P	^{47}S	^{48}Cl	^{49}Ar	^{50}K	^{51}Ca	^{52}Sc	^{53}Ti	^{54}V	^{55}Cr	^{56}Mn	^{57}Fe	^{58}Co	^{59}Ni	^{60}Cu
32	^{47}P	^{48}S	^{49}Cl	^{50}Ar	^{51}K	^{52}Ca	^{53}Sc	^{54}Ti	^{55}V	^{56}Cr	^{57}Mn	^{58}Fe	^{59}Co	^{60}Ni	^{61}Cu
	33	^{49}S	^{50}Cl	^{51}Ar	^{52}K	^{53}Ca	^{54}Sc	^{55}Ti	^{56}V	^{57}Cr	^{58}Mn	^{59}Fe	^{60}Co	^{61}Ni	^{62}Cu
		34	^{51}Cl	^{52}Ar	^{53}K	^{54}Ca	^{55}Sc	^{56}Ti	^{57}V	^{58}Cr	^{59}Mn	^{60}Fe	^{61}Co	^{62}Ni	^{63}Cu
		35	^{52}Cl	^{53}Ar	^{54}K	^{55}Ca	^{56}Sc	^{57}Ti	^{58}V	^{59}Cr	^{60}Mn	^{61}Fe	^{62}Co	^{63}Ni	^{64}Cu
			36	^{54}Ar	^{55}K	^{56}Ca	^{57}Sc	^{58}Ti	^{59}V	^{60}Cr	^{61}Mn	^{62}Fe	^{63}Co	^{64}Ni	^{65}Cu
				37	^{56}K	^{57}Ca	^{58}Sc	^{59}Ti	^{60}V	^{61}Cr	^{62}Mn	^{63}Fe	^{64}Co	^{65}Ni	^{66}Cu
				38	^{57}K	^{58}Ca	^{59}Sc	^{60}Ti	^{61}V	^{62}Cr	^{63}Mn	^{64}Fe	^{65}Co	^{66}Ni	^{67}Cu
				39		^{59}Ca	^{60}Sc	^{61}Ti	^{62}V	^{63}Cr	^{64}Mn	^{65}Fe	^{66}Co	^{67}Ni	^{68}Cu
				40	^{59}K	^{60}Ca	^{61}Sc	^{62}Ti	^{63}V	^{64}Cr	^{65}Mn	^{66}Fe	^{67}Co	^{68}Ni	^{69}Cu
					41		^{62}Sc	^{63}Ti	^{64}V	^{65}Cr	^{66}Mn	^{67}Fe	^{68}Co	^{69}Ni	^{70}Cu
						42		^{64}Ti	^{65}V	^{66}Cr	^{67}Mn	^{68}Fe	^{69}Co	^{70}Ni	^{71}Cu
							43		^{66}V	^{67}Cr	^{68}Mn	^{69}Fe	^{70}Co	^{71}Ni	^{72}Cu
								44	^{67}V	^{68}Cr	^{69}Mn	^{70}Fe	^{71}Co	^{72}Ni	^{73}Cu
									45	^{69}Cr	^{70}Mn	^{71}Fe	^{72}Co	^{73}Ni	^{74}Cu
									46	^{70}Cr	^{71}Mn	^{72}Fe	^{73}Co	^{74}Ni	^{75}Cu
										47	^{72}Mn	^{73}Fe	^{74}Co	^{75}Ni	^{76}Cu
										48	^{73}Mn	^{74}Fe	^{75}Co	^{76}Ni	^{77}Cu
											49	^{75}Fe	^{76}Co	^{77}Ni	^{78}Cu
											50	^{76}Fe	^{77}Co	^{78}Ni	^{79}Cu
												51	^{78}Co	^{79}Ni	^{80}Cu
													52	^{80}Ni	^{81}Cu
													53	^{81}Ni	^{82}Cu
													54	^{82}Ni	^{83}Cu

== Isotopes for elements 30-44 ==
← Previous | Next →Go to Unitized table (all elements)Go to Periodic table

Half-lives (example: Gd)
^{145}Gd	< 1 day
^{149}Gd	1–10 days
^{146}Gd	10–100 days
^{153}Gd	100 days–10 a
^{148}Gd	10–10,000 a
^{150}Gd	10 ka–700 Ma
^{152}Gd	> 700 Ma
^{158}Gd	Stable

Z →	30														
n ↓	Zn	31													
24	^{54}Zn	Ga	32												
25	^{55}Zn		Ge	33											
26	^{56}Zn			As											
27	^{57}Zn		^{59}Ge		34										
28	^{58}Zn		^{60}Ge		Se	35									
29	^{59}Zn	^{60}Ga	^{61}Ge		^{63}Se	Br	36								
30	^{60}Zn	^{61}Ga	^{62}Ge		^{64}Se		Kr								
31	^{61}Zn	^{62}Ga	^{63}Ge	^{64}As	^{65}Se		^{67}Kr								
32	^{62}Zn	^{63}Ga	^{64}Ge	^{65}As	^{66}Se		^{68}Kr	37							
33	^{63}Zn	^{64}Ga	^{65}Ge	^{66}As	^{67}Se	^{68}Br	^{69}Kr	Rb	38						
34	^{64}Zn	^{65}Ga	^{66}Ge	^{67}As	^{68}Se	^{69}Br	^{70}Kr		Sr	39					
35	^{65}Zn	^{66}Ga	^{67}Ge	^{68}As	^{69}Se	^{70}Br	^{71}Kr	^{72}Rb	^{73}Sr	Y	40				
36	^{66}Zn	^{67}Ga	^{68}Ge	^{69}As	^{70}Se	^{71}Br	^{72}Kr	^{73}Rb	^{74}Sr		Zr	41			
37	^{67}Zn	^{68}Ga	^{69}Ge	^{70}As	^{71}Se	^{72}Br	^{73}Kr	^{74}Rb	^{75}Sr	^{76}Y	^{77}Zr	Nb	42		
38	^{68}Zn	^{69}Ga	^{70}Ge	^{71}As	^{72}Se	^{73}Br	^{74}Kr	^{75}Rb	^{76}Sr	^{77}Y	^{78}Zr		Mo	43	
39	^{69}Zn	^{70}Ga	^{71}Ge	^{72}As	^{73}Se	^{74}Br	^{75}Kr	^{76}Rb	^{77}Sr	^{78}Y	^{79}Zr		^{81}Mo	Tc	44
40	^{70}Zn	^{71}Ga	^{72}Ge	^{73}As	^{74}Se	^{75}Br	^{76}Kr	^{77}Rb	^{78}Sr	^{79}Y	^{80}Zr		^{82}Mo		Ru
41	^{71}Zn	^{72}Ga	^{73}Ge	^{74}As	^{75}Se	^{76}Br	^{77}Kr	^{78}Rb	^{79}Sr	^{80}Y	^{81}Zr	^{82}Nb	^{83}Mo		^{85}Ru
42	^{72}Zn	^{73}Ga	^{74}Ge	^{75}As	^{76}Se	^{77}Br	^{78}Kr	^{79}Rb	^{80}Sr	^{81}Y	^{82}Zr	^{83}Nb	^{84}Mo		^{86}Ru
43	^{73}Zn	^{74}Ga	^{75}Ge	^{76}As	^{77}Se	^{78}Br	^{79}Kr	^{80}Rb	^{81}Sr	^{82}Y	^{83}Zr	^{84}Nb	^{85}Mo	^{86}Tc	^{87}Ru
44	^{74}Zn	^{75}Ga	^{76}Ge	^{77}As	^{78}Se	^{79}Br	^{80}Kr	^{81}Rb	^{82}Sr	^{83}Y	^{84}Zr	^{85}Nb	^{86}Mo	^{87}Tc	^{88}Ru
45	^{75}Zn	^{76}Ga	^{77}Ge	^{78}As	^{79}Se	^{80}Br	^{81}Kr	^{82}Rb	^{83}Sr	^{84}Y	^{85}Zr	^{86}Nb	^{87}Mo	^{88}Tc	^{89}Ru
46	^{76}Zn	^{77}Ga	^{78}Ge	^{79}As	^{80}Se	^{81}Br	^{82}Kr	^{83}Rb	^{84}Sr	^{85}Y	^{86}Zr	^{87}Nb	^{88}Mo	^{89}Tc	^{90}Ru
47	^{77}Zn	^{78}Ga	^{79}Ge	^{80}As	^{81}Se	^{82}Br	^{83}Kr	^{84}Rb	^{85}Sr	^{86}Y	^{87}Zr	^{88}Nb	^{89}Mo	^{90}Tc	^{91}Ru
48	^{78}Zn	^{79}Ga	^{80}Ge	^{81}As	^{82}Se	^{83}Br	^{84}Kr	^{85}Rb	^{86}Sr	^{87}Y	^{88}Zr	^{89}Nb	^{90}Mo	^{91}Tc	^{92}Ru
49	^{79}Zn	^{80}Ga	^{81}Ge	^{82}As	^{83}Se	^{84}Br	^{85}Kr	^{86}Rb	^{87}Sr	^{88}Y	^{89}Zr	^{90}Nb	^{91}Mo	^{92}Tc	^{93}Ru
50	^{80}Zn	^{81}Ga	^{82}Ge	^{83}As	^{84}Se	^{85}Br	^{86}Kr	^{87}Rb	^{88}Sr	^{89}Y	^{90}Zr	^{91}Nb	^{92}Mo	^{93}Tc	^{94}Ru
51	^{81}Zn	^{82}Ga	^{83}Ge	^{84}As	^{85}Se	^{86}Br	^{87}Kr	^{88}Rb	^{89}Sr	^{90}Y	^{91}Zr	^{92}Nb	^{93}Mo	^{94}Tc	^{95}Ru
52	^{82}Zn	^{83}Ga	^{84}Ge	^{85}As	^{86}Se	^{87}Br	^{88}Kr	^{89}Rb	^{90}Sr	^{91}Y	^{92}Zr	^{93}Nb	^{94}Mo	^{95}Tc	^{96}Ru
53	^{83}Zn	^{84}Ga	^{85}Ge	^{86}As	^{87}Se	^{88}Br	^{89}Kr	^{90}Rb	^{91}Sr	^{92}Y	^{93}Zr	^{94}Nb	^{95}Mo	^{96}Tc	^{97}Ru
54	^{84}Zn	^{85}Ga	^{86}Ge	^{87}As	^{88}Se	^{89}Br	^{90}Kr	^{91}Rb	^{92}Sr	^{93}Y	^{94}Zr	^{95}Nb	^{96}Mo	^{97}Tc	^{98}Ru
55	^{85}Zn	^{86}Ga	^{87}Ge	^{88}As	^{89}Se	^{90}Br	^{91}Kr	^{92}Rb	^{93}Sr	^{94}Y	^{95}Zr	^{96}Nb	^{97}Mo	^{98}Tc	^{99}Ru
	56	^{87}Ga	^{88}Ge	^{89}As	^{90}Se	^{91}Br	^{92}Kr	^{93}Rb	^{94}Sr	^{95}Y	^{96}Zr	^{97}Nb	^{98}Mo	^{99}Tc	^{100}Ru
	57		^{89}Ge	^{90}As	^{91}Se	^{92}Br	^{93}Kr	^{94}Rb	^{95}Sr	^{96}Y	^{97}Zr	^{98}Nb	^{99}Mo	^{100}Tc	^{101}Ru
		58	^{90}Ge	^{91}As	^{92}Se	^{93}Br	^{94}Kr	^{95}Rb	^{96}Sr	^{97}Y	^{98}Zr	^{99}Nb	^{100}Mo	^{101}Tc	^{102}Ru
			59	^{92}As	^{93}Se	^{94}Br	^{95}Kr	^{96}Rb	^{97}Sr	^{98}Y	^{99}Zr	^{100}Nb	^{101}Mo	^{102}Tc	^{103}Ru
				60	^{94}Se	^{95}Br	^{96}Kr	^{97}Rb	^{98}Sr	^{99}Y	^{100}Zr	^{101}Nb	^{102}Mo	^{103}Tc	^{104}Ru
				61	^{95}Se	^{96}Br	^{97}Kr	^{98}Rb	^{99}Sr	^{100}Y	^{101}Zr	^{102}Nb	^{103}Mo	^{104}Tc	^{105}Ru
					62	^{97}Br	^{98}Kr	^{99}Rb	^{100}Sr	^{101}Y	^{102}Zr	^{103}Nb	^{104}Mo	^{105}Tc	^{106}Ru
					63	^{98}Br	^{99}Kr	^{100}Rb	^{101}Sr	^{102}Y	^{103}Zr	^{104}Nb	^{105}Mo	^{106}Tc	^{107}Ru
					64		^{100}Kr	^{101}Rb	^{102}Sr	^{103}Y	^{104}Zr	^{105}Nb	^{106}Mo	^{107}Tc	^{108}Ru
					65		^{101}Kr	^{102}Rb	^{103}Sr	^{104}Y	^{105}Zr	^{106}Nb	^{107}Mo	^{108}Tc	^{109}Ru
					66	^{101}Br	^{102}Kr	^{103}Rb	^{104}Sr	^{105}Y	^{106}Zr	^{107}Nb	^{108}Mo	^{109}Tc	^{110}Ru
							67	^{104}Rb	^{105}Sr	^{106}Y	^{107}Zr	^{108}Nb	^{109}Mo	^{110}Tc	^{111}Ru
							68	^{105}Rb	^{106}Sr	^{107}Y	^{108}Zr	^{109}Nb	^{110}Mo	^{111}Tc	^{112}Ru
							69	^{106}Rb	^{107}Sr	^{108}Y	^{109}Zr	^{110}Nb	^{111}Mo	^{112}Tc	^{113}Ru
								70	^{108}Sr	^{109}Y	^{110}Zr	^{111}Nb	^{112}Mo	^{113}Tc	^{114}Ru
									71	^{110}Y	^{111}Zr	^{112}Nb	^{113}Mo	^{114}Tc	^{115}Ru
									72	^{111}Y	^{112}Zr	^{113}Nb	^{114}Mo	^{115}Tc	^{116}Ru
										73	^{113}Zr	^{114}Nb	^{115}Mo	^{116}Tc	^{117}Ru
											74	^{115}Nb	^{116}Mo	^{117}Tc	^{118}Ru
											75	^{116}Nb	^{117}Mo	^{118}Tc	^{119}Ru
											76	^{117}Nb	^{118}Mo	^{119}Tc	^{120}Ru
												77	^{119}Mo	^{120}Tc	^{121}Ru
													78	^{121}Tc	^{122}Ru
													79	^{122}Tc	^{123}Ru
														80	^{124}Ru
														81	^{125}Ru

== Isotopes for elements 45-59 ==
← Previous | Next →Go to Unitized table (all elements)Go to Periodic table

Half-lives (example: Gd)
^{145}Gd	< 1 day
^{149}Gd	1–10 days
^{146}Gd	10–100 days
^{153}Gd	100 days–10 a
^{148}Gd	10–10,000 a
^{150}Gd	10 ka–700 Ma
^{152}Gd	> 700 Ma
^{158}Gd	Stable

Z →	45														
n ↓	Rh	46													
43		Pd	47												
44	^{89}Rh	^{90}Pd	Ag	48											
45	^{90}Rh	^{91}Pd	^{92}Ag	Cd	49										
46	^{91}Rh	^{92}Pd	^{93}Ag	^{94}Cd	In										
47	^{92}Rh	^{93}Pd	^{94}Ag	^{95}Cd	^{96}In	50									
48	^{93}Rh	^{94}Pd	^{95}Ag	^{96}Cd	^{97}In	Sn									
49	^{94}Rh	^{95}Pd	^{96}Ag	^{97}Cd	^{98}In	^{99}Sn	51								
50	^{95}Rh	^{96}Pd	^{97}Ag	^{98}Cd	^{99}In	^{100}Sn	Sb	52							
51	^{96}Rh	^{97}Pd	^{98}Ag	^{99}Cd	^{100}In	^{101}Sn		Te	53						
52	^{97}Rh	^{98}Pd	^{99}Ag	^{100}Cd	^{101}In	^{102}Sn	^{103}Sb	^{104}Te	I	54					
53	^{98}Rh	^{99}Pd	^{100}Ag	^{101}Cd	^{102}In	^{103}Sn	^{104}Sb	^{105}Te		Xe					
54	^{99}Rh	^{100}Pd	^{101}Ag	^{102}Cd	^{103}In	^{104}Sn	^{105}Sb	^{106}Te		^{108}Xe	55				
55	^{100}Rh	^{101}Pd	^{102}Ag	^{103}Cd	^{104}In	^{105}Sn	^{106}Sb	^{107}Te	^{108}I	^{109}Xe	Cs	56			
56	^{101}Rh	^{102}Pd	^{103}Ag	^{104}Cd	^{105}In	^{106}Sn	^{107}Sb	^{108}Te	^{109}I	^{110}Xe		Ba			
57	^{102}Rh	^{103}Pd	^{104}Ag	^{105}Cd	^{106}In	^{107}Sn	^{108}Sb	^{109}Te	^{110}I	^{111}Xe	^{112}Cs		57		
58	^{103}Rh	^{104}Pd	^{105}Ag	^{106}Cd	^{107}In	^{108}Sn	^{109}Sb	^{110}Te	^{111}I	^{112}Xe	^{113}Cs	^{114}Ba	La		
59	^{104}Rh	^{105}Pd	^{106}Ag	^{107}Cd	^{108}In	^{109}Sn	^{110}Sb	^{111}Te	^{112}I	^{113}Xe	^{114}Cs	^{115}Ba		58	
60	^{105}Rh	^{106}Pd	^{107}Ag	^{108}Cd	^{109}In	^{110}Sn	^{111}Sb	^{112}Te	^{113}I	^{114}Xe	^{115}Cs	^{116}Ba	^{117}La	Ce	59
61	^{106}Rh	^{107}Pd	^{108}Ag	^{109}Cd	^{110}In	^{111}Sn	^{112}Sb	^{113}Te	^{114}I	^{115}Xe	^{116}Cs	^{117}Ba	^{118}La		Pr
62	^{107}Rh	^{108}Pd	^{109}Ag	^{110}Cd	^{111}In	^{112}Sn	^{113}Sb	^{114}Te	^{115}I	^{116}Xe	^{117}Cs	^{118}Ba	^{119}La		^{121}Pr
63	^{108}Rh	^{109}Pd	^{110}Ag	^{111}Cd	^{112}In	^{113}Sn	^{114}Sb	^{115}Te	^{116}I	^{117}Xe	^{118}Cs	^{119}Ba	^{120}La	^{121}Ce	^{122}Pr
64	^{109}Rh	^{110}Pd	^{111}Ag	^{112}Cd	^{113}In	^{114}Sn	^{115}Sb	^{116}Te	^{117}I	^{118}Xe	^{119}Cs	^{120}Ba	^{121}La	^{122}Ce	^{123}Pr
65	^{110}Rh	^{111}Pd	^{112}Ag	^{113}Cd	^{114}In	^{115}Sn	^{116}Sb	^{117}Te	^{118}I	^{119}Xe	^{120}Cs	^{121}Ba	^{122}La	^{123}Ce	^{124}Pr
66	^{111}Rh	^{112}Pd	^{113}Ag	^{114}Cd	^{115}In	^{116}Sn	^{117}Sb	^{118}Te	^{119}I	^{120}Xe	^{121}Cs	^{122}Ba	^{123}La	^{124}Ce	^{125}Pr
67	^{112}Rh	^{113}Pd	^{114}Ag	^{115}Cd	^{116}In	^{117}Sn	^{118}Sb	^{119}Te	^{120}I	^{121}Xe	^{122}Cs	^{123}Ba	^{124}La	^{125}Ce	^{126}Pr
68	^{113}Rh	^{114}Pd	^{115}Ag	^{116}Cd	^{117}In	^{118}Sn	^{119}Sb	^{120}Te	^{121}I	^{122}Xe	^{123}Cs	^{124}Ba	^{125}La	^{126}Ce	^{127}Pr
69	^{114}Rh	^{115}Pd	^{116}Ag	^{117}Cd	^{118}In	^{119}Sn	^{120}Sb	^{121}Te	^{122}I	^{123}Xe	^{124}Cs	^{125}Ba	^{126}La	^{127}Ce	^{128}Pr
70	^{115}Rh	^{116}Pd	^{117}Ag	^{118}Cd	^{119}In	^{120}Sn	^{121}Sb	^{122}Te	^{123}I	^{124}Xe	^{125}Cs	^{126}Ba	^{127}La	^{128}Ce	^{129}Pr
71	^{116}Rh	^{117}Pd	^{118}Ag	^{119}Cd	^{120}In	^{121}Sn	^{122}Sb	^{123}Te	^{124}I	^{125}Xe	^{126}Cs	^{127}Ba	^{128}La	^{129}Ce	^{130}Pr
72	^{117}Rh	^{118}Pd	^{119}Ag	^{120}Cd	^{121}In	^{122}Sn	^{123}Sb	^{124}Te	^{125}I	^{126}Xe	^{127}Cs	^{128}Ba	^{129}La	^{130}Ce	^{131}Pr
73	^{118}Rh	^{119}Pd	^{120}Ag	^{121}Cd	^{122}In	^{123}Sn	^{124}Sb	^{125}Te	^{126}I	^{127}Xe	^{128}Cs	^{129}Ba	^{130}La	^{131}Ce	^{132}Pr
74	^{119}Rh	^{120}Pd	^{121}Ag	^{122}Cd	^{123}In	^{124}Sn	^{125}Sb	^{126}Te	^{127}I	^{128}Xe	^{129}Cs	^{130}Ba	^{131}La	^{132}Ce	^{133}Pr
75	^{120}Rh	^{121}Pd	^{122}Ag	^{123}Cd	^{124}In	^{125}Sn	^{126}Sb	^{127}Te	^{128}I	^{129}Xe	^{130}Cs	^{131}Ba	^{132}La	^{133}Ce	^{134}Pr
76	^{121}Rh	^{122}Pd	^{123}Ag	^{124}Cd	^{125}In	^{126}Sn	^{127}Sb	^{128}Te	^{129}I	^{130}Xe	^{131}Cs	^{132}Ba	^{133}La	^{134}Ce	^{135}Pr
77	^{122}Rh	^{123}Pd	^{124}Ag	^{125}Cd	^{126}In	^{127}Sn	^{128}Sb	^{129}Te	^{130}I	^{131}Xe	^{132}Cs	^{133}Ba	^{134}La	^{135}Ce	^{136}Pr
78	^{123}Rh	^{124}Pd	^{125}Ag	^{126}Cd	^{127}In	^{128}Sn	^{129}Sb	^{130}Te	^{131}I	^{132}Xe	^{133}Cs	^{134}Ba	^{135}La	^{136}Ce	^{137}Pr
79	^{124}Rh	^{125}Pd	^{126}Ag	^{127}Cd	^{128}In	^{129}Sn	^{130}Sb	^{131}Te	^{132}I	^{133}Xe	^{134}Cs	^{135}Ba	^{136}La	^{137}Ce	^{138}Pr
80	^{125}Rh	^{126}Pd	^{127}Ag	^{128}Cd	^{129}In	^{130}Sn	^{131}Sb	^{132}Te	^{133}I	^{134}Xe	^{135}Cs	^{136}Ba	^{137}La	^{138}Ce	^{139}Pr
81	^{126}Rh	^{127}Pd	^{128}Ag	^{129}Cd	^{130}In	^{131}Sn	^{132}Sb	^{133}Te	^{134}I	^{135}Xe	^{136}Cs	^{137}Ba	^{138}La	^{139}Ce	^{140}Pr
82	^{127}Rh	^{128}Pd	^{129}Ag	^{130}Cd	^{131}In	^{132}Sn	^{133}Sb	^{134}Te	^{135}I	^{136}Xe	^{137}Cs	^{138}Ba	^{139}La	^{140}Ce	^{141}Pr
83	^{128}Rh	^{129}Pd	^{130}Ag	^{131}Cd	^{132}In	^{133}Sn	^{134}Sb	^{135}Te	^{136}I	^{137}Xe	^{138}Cs	^{139}Ba	^{140}La	^{141}Ce	^{142}Pr
	84	^{130}Pd	^{131}Ag	^{132}Cd	^{133}In	^{134}Sn	^{135}Sb	^{136}Te	^{137}I	^{138}Xe	^{139}Cs	^{140}Ba	^{141}La	^{142}Ce	^{143}Pr
	85	^{131}Pd	^{132}Ag	^{133}Cd	^{134}In	^{135}Sn	^{136}Sb	^{137}Te	^{138}I	^{139}Xe	^{140}Cs	^{141}Ba	^{142}La	^{143}Ce	^{144}Pr
		86		^{134}Cd	^{135}In	^{136}Sn	^{137}Sb	^{138}Te	^{139}I	^{140}Xe	^{141}Cs	^{142}Ba	^{143}La	^{144}Ce	^{145}Pr
			87		^{136}In	^{137}Sn	^{138}Sb	^{139}Te	^{140}I	^{141}Xe	^{142}Cs	^{143}Ba	^{144}La	^{145}Ce	^{146}Pr
				88	^{137}In	^{138}Sn	^{139}Sb	^{140}Te	^{141}I	^{142}Xe	^{143}Cs	^{144}Ba	^{145}La	^{146}Ce	^{147}Pr
					89	^{139}Sn	^{140}Sb	^{141}Te	^{142}I	^{143}Xe	^{144}Cs	^{145}Ba	^{146}La	^{147}Ce	^{148}Pr
					90	^{140}Sn	^{141}Sb	^{142}Te	^{143}I	^{144}Xe	^{145}Cs	^{146}Ba	^{147}La	^{148}Ce	^{149}Pr
						91	^{142}Sb	^{143}Te	^{144}I	^{145}Xe	^{146}Cs	^{147}Ba	^{148}La	^{149}Ce	^{150}Pr
							92	^{144}Te	^{145}I	^{146}Xe	^{147}Cs	^{148}Ba	^{149}La	^{150}Ce	^{151}Pr
							93	^{145}Te	^{146}I	^{147}Xe	^{148}Cs	^{149}Ba	^{150}La	^{151}Ce	^{152}Pr
								94	^{147}I	^{148}Xe	^{149}Cs	^{150}Ba	^{151}La	^{152}Ce	^{153}Pr
									95	^{149}Xe	^{150}Cs	^{151}Ba	^{152}La	^{153}Ce	^{154}Pr
									96	^{150}Xe	^{151}Cs	^{152}Ba	^{153}La	^{154}Ce	^{155}Pr
										97	^{152}Cs	^{153}Ba	^{154}La	^{155}Ce	^{156}Pr
											98	^{154}Ba	^{155}La	^{156}Ce	^{157}Pr
												99	^{156}La	^{157}Ce	^{158}Pr
												100	^{157}La	^{158}Ce	^{159}Pr
													101		^{160}Pr
														102	^{161}Pr

== Isotopes for elements 60-74 ==
← Previous | Next →Go to Unitized table (all elements)Go to Periodic table

Half-lives (example: Gd)
^{145}Gd	< 1 day
^{149}Gd	1–10 days
^{146}Gd	10–100 days
^{153}Gd	100 days–10 a
^{148}Gd	10–10,000 a
^{150}Gd	10 ka–700 Ma
^{152}Gd	> 700 Ma
^{158}Gd	Stable

Z →	60														
n ↓	Nd	61													
64		Pm	62												
65	^{125}Nd		Sm	63											
66	^{126}Nd			Eu											
67	^{127}Nd	^{128}Pm	^{129}Sm	^{130}Eu	64										
68	^{128}Nd	^{129}Pm	^{130}Sm	^{131}Eu	Gd	65									
69	^{129}Nd	^{130}Pm	^{131}Sm			Tb									
70	^{130}Nd	^{131}Pm	^{132}Sm			^{135}Tb	66								
71	^{131}Nd	^{132}Pm	^{133}Sm	^{134}Eu	^{135}Gd		Dy	67							
72	^{132}Nd	^{133}Pm	^{134}Sm	^{135}Eu	^{136}Gd			Ho	68						
73	^{133}Nd	^{134}Pm	^{135}Sm	^{136}Eu	^{137}Gd	^{138}Tb	^{139}Dy	^{140}Ho	Er	69					
74	^{134}Nd	^{135}Pm	^{136}Sm	^{137}Eu	^{138}Gd	^{139}Tb	^{140}Dy	^{141}Ho		Tm					
75	^{135}Nd	^{136}Pm	^{137}Sm	^{138}Eu	^{139}Gd	^{140}Tb	^{141}Dy	^{142}Ho	^{143}Er	^{144}Tm					
76	^{136}Nd	^{137}Pm	^{138}Sm	^{139}Eu	^{140}Gd	^{141}Tb	^{142}Dy	^{143}Ho	^{144}Er	^{145}Tm	70				
77	^{137}Nd	^{138}Pm	^{139}Sm	^{140}Eu	^{141}Gd	^{142}Tb	^{143}Dy	^{144}Ho	^{145}Er	^{146}Tm	Yb	71			
78	^{138}Nd	^{139}Pm	^{140}Sm	^{141}Eu	^{142}Gd	^{143}Tb	^{144}Dy	^{145}Ho	^{146}Er	^{147}Tm		Lu			
79	^{139}Nd	^{140}Pm	^{141}Sm	^{142}Eu	^{143}Gd	^{144}Tb	^{145}Dy	^{146}Ho	^{147}Er	^{148}Tm	^{149}Yb	^{150}Lu	72		
80	^{140}Nd	^{141}Pm	^{142}Sm	^{143}Eu	^{144}Gd	^{145}Tb	^{146}Dy	^{147}Ho	^{148}Er	^{149}Tm	^{150}Yb	^{151}Lu	Hf	73	74
81	^{141}Nd	^{142}Pm	^{143}Sm	^{144}Eu	^{145}Gd	^{146}Tb	^{147}Dy	^{148}Ho	^{149}Er	^{150}Tm	^{151}Yb	^{152}Lu	^{153}Hf	Ta	W
82	^{142}Nd	^{143}Pm	^{144}Sm	^{145}Eu	^{146}Gd	^{147}Tb	^{148}Dy	^{149}Ho	^{150}Er	^{151}Tm	^{152}Yb	^{153}Lu	^{154}Hf	^{155}Ta	^{156}W
83	^{143}Nd	^{144}Pm	^{145}Sm	^{146}Eu	^{147}Gd	^{148}Tb	^{149}Dy	^{150}Ho	^{151}Er	^{152}Tm	^{153}Yb	^{154}Lu	^{155}Hf	^{156}Ta	^{157}W
84	^{144}Nd	^{145}Pm	^{146}Sm	^{147}Eu	^{148}Gd	^{149}Tb	^{150}Dy	^{151}Ho	^{152}Er	^{153}Tm	^{154}Yb	^{155}Lu	^{156}Hf	^{157}Ta	^{158}W
85	^{145}Nd	^{146}Pm	^{147}Sm	^{148}Eu	^{149}Gd	^{150}Tb	^{151}Dy	^{152}Ho	^{153}Er	^{154}Tm	^{155}Yb	^{156}Lu	^{157}Hf	^{158}Ta	^{159}W
86	^{146}Nd	^{147}Pm	^{148}Sm	^{149}Eu	^{150}Gd	^{151}Tb	^{152}Dy	^{153}Ho	^{154}Er	^{155}Tm	^{156}Yb	^{157}Lu	^{158}Hf	^{159}Ta	^{160}W
87	^{147}Nd	^{148}Pm	^{149}Sm	^{150}Eu	^{151}Gd	^{152}Tb	^{153}Dy	^{154}Ho	^{155}Er	^{156}Tm	^{157}Yb	^{158}Lu	^{159}Hf	^{160}Ta	^{161}W
88	^{148}Nd	^{149}Pm	^{150}Sm	^{151}Eu	^{152}Gd	^{153}Tb	^{154}Dy	^{155}Ho	^{156}Er	^{157}Tm	^{158}Yb	^{159}Lu	^{160}Hf	^{161}Ta	^{162}W
89	^{149}Nd	^{150}Pm	^{151}Sm	^{152}Eu	^{153}Gd	^{154}Tb	^{155}Dy	^{156}Ho	^{157}Er	^{158}Tm	^{159}Yb	^{160}Lu	^{161}Hf	^{162}Ta	^{163}W
90	^{150}Nd	^{151}Pm	^{152}Sm	^{153}Eu	^{154}Gd	^{155}Tb	^{156}Dy	^{157}Ho	^{158}Er	^{159}Tm	^{160}Yb	^{161}Lu	^{162}Hf	^{163}Ta	^{164}W
91	^{151}Nd	^{152}Pm	^{153}Sm	^{154}Eu	^{155}Gd	^{156}Tb	^{157}Dy	^{158}Ho	^{159}Er	^{160}Tm	^{161}Yb	^{162}Lu	^{163}Hf	^{164}Ta	^{165}W
92	^{152}Nd	^{153}Pm	^{154}Sm	^{155}Eu	^{156}Gd	^{157}Tb	^{158}Dy	^{159}Ho	^{160}Er	^{161}Tm	^{162}Yb	^{163}Lu	^{164}Hf	^{165}Ta	^{166}W
93	^{153}Nd	^{154}Pm	^{155}Sm	^{156}Eu	^{157}Gd	^{158}Tb	^{159}Dy	^{160}Ho	^{161}Er	^{162}Tm	^{163}Yb	^{164}Lu	^{165}Hf	^{166}Ta	^{167}W
94	^{154}Nd	^{155}Pm	^{156}Sm	^{157}Eu	^{158}Gd	^{159}Tb	^{160}Dy	^{161}Ho	^{162}Er	^{163}Tm	^{164}Yb	^{165}Lu	^{166}Hf	^{167}Ta	^{168}W
95	^{155}Nd	^{156}Pm	^{157}Sm	^{158}Eu	^{159}Gd	^{160}Tb	^{161}Dy	^{162}Ho	^{163}Er	^{164}Tm	^{165}Yb	^{166}Lu	^{167}Hf	^{168}Ta	^{169}W
96	^{156}Nd	^{157}Pm	^{158}Sm	^{159}Eu	^{160}Gd	^{161}Tb	^{162}Dy	^{163}Ho	^{164}Er	^{165}Tm	^{166}Yb	^{167}Lu	^{168}Hf	^{169}Ta	^{170}W
97	^{157}Nd	^{158}Pm	^{159}Sm	^{160}Eu	^{161}Gd	^{162}Tb	^{163}Dy	^{164}Ho	^{165}Er	^{166}Tm	^{167}Yb	^{168}Lu	^{169}Hf	^{170}Ta	^{171}W
98	^{158}Nd	^{159}Pm	^{160}Sm	^{161}Eu	^{162}Gd	^{163}Tb	^{164}Dy	^{165}Ho	^{166}Er	^{167}Tm	^{168}Yb	^{169}Lu	^{170}Hf	^{171}Ta	^{172}W
99	^{159}Nd	^{160}Pm	^{161}Sm	^{162}Eu	^{163}Gd	^{164}Tb	^{165}Dy	^{166}Ho	^{167}Er	^{168}Tm	^{169}Yb	^{170}Lu	^{171}Hf	^{172}Ta	^{173}W
100	^{160}Nd	^{161}Pm	^{162}Sm	^{163}Eu	^{164}Gd	^{165}Tb	^{166}Dy	^{167}Ho	^{168}Er	^{169}Tm	^{170}Yb	^{171}Lu	^{172}Hf	^{173}Ta	^{174}W
101	^{161}Nd	^{162}Pm	^{163}Sm	^{164}Eu	^{165}Gd	^{166}Tb	^{167}Dy	^{168}Ho	^{169}Er	^{170}Tm	^{171}Yb	^{172}Lu	^{173}Hf	^{174}Ta	^{175}W
102	^{162}Nd	^{163}Pm	^{164}Sm	^{165}Eu	^{166}Gd	^{167}Tb	^{168}Dy	^{169}Ho	^{170}Er	^{171}Tm	^{172}Yb	^{173}Lu	^{174}Hf	^{175}Ta	^{176}W
103	^{163}Nd	^{164}Pm	^{165}Sm	^{166}Eu	^{167}Gd	^{168}Tb	^{169}Dy	^{170}Ho	^{171}Er	^{172}Tm	^{173}Yb	^{174}Lu	^{175}Hf	^{176}Ta	^{177}W
	104	^{165}Pm	^{166}Sm	^{167}Eu	^{168}Gd	^{169}Tb	^{170}Dy	^{171}Ho	^{172}Er	^{173}Tm	^{174}Yb	^{175}Lu	^{176}Hf	^{177}Ta	^{178}W
	105	^{166}Pm	^{167}Sm	^{168}Eu	^{169}Gd	^{170}Tb	^{171}Dy	^{172}Ho	^{173}Er	^{174}Tm	^{175}Yb	^{176}Lu	^{177}Hf	^{178}Ta	^{179}W
		106	^{168}Sm	^{169}Eu	^{170}Gd	^{171}Tb	^{172}Dy	^{173}Ho	^{174}Er	^{175}Tm	^{176}Yb	^{177}Lu	^{178}Hf	^{179}Ta	^{180}W
			107	^{170}Eu	^{171}Gd	^{172}Tb	^{173}Dy	^{174}Ho	^{175}Er	^{176}Tm	^{177}Yb	^{178}Lu	^{179}Hf	^{180}Ta	^{181}W
				108	^{172}Gd	^{173}Tb	^{174}Dy	^{175}Ho	^{176}Er	^{177}Tm	^{178}Yb	^{179}Lu	^{180}Hf	^{181}Ta	^{182}W
					109	^{174}Tb	^{175}Dy	^{176}Ho	^{177}Er	^{178}Tm	^{179}Yb	^{180}Lu	^{181}Hf	^{182}Ta	^{183}W
						110	^{176}Dy	^{177}Ho	^{178}Er	^{179}Tm	^{180}Yb	^{181}Lu	^{182}Hf	^{183}Ta	^{184}W
							111	^{178}Ho	^{179}Er	^{180}Tm	^{181}Yb	^{182}Lu	^{183}Hf	^{184}Ta	^{185}W
								112	^{180}Er	^{181}Tm	^{182}Yb	^{183}Lu	^{184}Hf	^{185}Ta	^{186}W
									113	^{182}Tm	^{183}Yb	^{184}Lu	^{185}Hf	^{186}Ta	^{187}W
									114	^{183}Tm	^{184}Yb	^{185}Lu	^{186}Hf	^{187}Ta	^{188}W
										115	^{185}Yb	^{186}Lu	^{187}Hf	^{188}Ta	^{189}W
										116	^{186}Yb	^{187}Lu	^{188}Hf	^{189}Ta	^{190}W
										117	^{187}Yb	^{188}Lu	^{189}Hf	^{190}Ta	^{191}W
											118	^{189}Lu	^{190}Hf	^{191}Ta	^{192}W
											119	^{190}Lu	^{191}Hf	^{192}Ta	^{193}W
												120	^{192}Hf	^{193}Ta	^{194}W
													121	^{194}Ta	^{195}W
														122	^{196}W
														123	^{197}W

== Isotopes for elements 75-89 ==
← Previous | Next →Go to Unitized table (all elements)Go to Periodic table

Half-lives (example: Gd)
^{145}Gd	< 1 day
^{149}Gd	1–10 days
^{146}Gd	10–100 days
^{153}Gd	100 days–10 a
^{148}Gd	10–10,000 a
^{150}Gd	10 ka–700 Ma
^{152}Gd	> 700 Ma
^{158}Gd	Stable

Z →	75	76													
n ↓	Re	Os													
84	^{159}Re	^{160}Os	77												
85	^{160}Re	^{161}Os	Ir	78											
86	^{161}Re	^{162}Os		Pt											
87	^{162}Re	^{163}Os		^{165}Pt	79										
88	^{163}Re	^{164}Os	^{165}Ir	^{166}Pt	Au	80									
89	^{164}Re	^{165}Os	^{166}Ir	^{167}Pt		Hg									
90	^{165}Re	^{166}Os	^{167}Ir	^{168}Pt		^{170}Hg									
91	^{166}Re	^{167}Os	^{168}Ir	^{169}Pt	^{170}Au	^{171}Hg									
92	^{167}Re	^{168}Os	^{169}Ir	^{170}Pt	^{171}Au	^{172}Hg									
93	^{168}Re	^{169}Os	^{170}Ir	^{171}Pt	^{172}Au	^{173}Hg	81								
94	^{169}Re	^{170}Os	^{171}Ir	^{172}Pt	^{173}Au	^{174}Hg	Tl	82							
95	^{170}Re	^{171}Os	^{172}Ir	^{173}Pt	^{174}Au	^{175}Hg	^{176}Tl	Pb							
96	^{171}Re	^{172}Os	^{173}Ir	^{174}Pt	^{175}Au	^{176}Hg	^{177}Tl	^{178}Pb							
97	^{172}Re	^{173}Os	^{174}Ir	^{175}Pt	^{176}Au	^{177}Hg	^{178}Tl	^{179}Pb							
98	^{173}Re	^{174}Os	^{175}Ir	^{176}Pt	^{177}Au	^{178}Hg	^{179}Tl	^{180}Pb							
99	^{174}Re	^{175}Os	^{176}Ir	^{177}Pt	^{178}Au	^{179}Hg	^{180}Tl	^{181}Pb	83						
100	^{175}Re	^{176}Os	^{177}Ir	^{178}Pt	^{179}Au	^{180}Hg	^{181}Tl	^{182}Pb	Bi	84					
101	^{176}Re	^{177}Os	^{178}Ir	^{179}Pt	^{180}Au	^{181}Hg	^{182}Tl	^{183}Pb	^{184}Bi	Po	85				
102	^{177}Re	^{178}Os	^{179}Ir	^{180}Pt	^{181}Au	^{182}Hg	^{183}Tl	^{184}Pb	^{185}Bi	^{186}Po	At				
103	^{178}Re	^{179}Os	^{180}Ir	^{181}Pt	^{182}Au	^{183}Hg	^{184}Tl	^{185}Pb	^{186}Bi	^{187}Po	^{188}At				
104	^{179}Re	^{180}Os	^{181}Ir	^{182}Pt	^{183}Au	^{184}Hg	^{185}Tl	^{186}Pb	^{187}Bi	^{188}Po					
105	^{180}Re	^{181}Os	^{182}Ir	^{183}Pt	^{184}Au	^{185}Hg	^{186}Tl	^{187}Pb	^{188}Bi	^{189}Po	^{190}At	86			
106	^{181}Re	^{182}Os	^{183}Ir	^{184}Pt	^{185}Au	^{186}Hg	^{187}Tl	^{188}Pb	^{189}Bi	^{190}Po	^{191}At	Rn			
107	^{182}Re	^{183}Os	^{184}Ir	^{185}Pt	^{186}Au	^{187}Hg	^{188}Tl	^{189}Pb	^{190}Bi	^{191}Po	^{192}At	^{193}Rn			
108	^{183}Re	^{184}Os	^{185}Ir	^{186}Pt	^{187}Au	^{188}Hg	^{189}Tl	^{190}Pb	^{191}Bi	^{192}Po	^{193}At	^{194}Rn	87		
109	^{184}Re	^{185}Os	^{186}Ir	^{187}Pt	^{188}Au	^{189}Hg	^{190}Tl	^{191}Pb	^{192}Bi	^{193}Po	^{194}At	^{195}Rn	Fr		
110	^{185}Re	^{186}Os	^{187}Ir	^{188}Pt	^{189}Au	^{190}Hg	^{191}Tl	^{192}Pb	^{193}Bi	^{194}Po	^{195}At	^{196}Rn	^{197}Fr		
111	^{186}Re	^{187}Os	^{188}Ir	^{189}Pt	^{190}Au	^{191}Hg	^{192}Tl	^{193}Pb	^{194}Bi	^{195}Po	^{196}At	^{197}Rn	^{198}Fr	88	
112	^{187}Re	^{188}Os	^{189}Ir	^{190}Pt	^{191}Au	^{192}Hg	^{193}Tl	^{194}Pb	^{195}Bi	^{196}Po	^{197}At	^{198}Rn	^{199}Fr	Ra	89
113	^{188}Re	^{189}Os	^{190}Ir	^{191}Pt	^{192}Au	^{193}Hg	^{194}Tl	^{195}Pb	^{196}Bi	^{197}Po	^{198}At	^{199}Rn	^{200}Fr	^{201}Ra	Ac
114	^{189}Re	^{190}Os	^{191}Ir	^{192}Pt	^{193}Au	^{194}Hg	^{195}Tl	^{196}Pb	^{197}Bi	^{198}Po	^{199}At	^{200}Rn	^{201}Fr	^{202}Ra	^{203}Ac
115	^{190}Re	^{191}Os	^{192}Ir	^{193}Pt	^{194}Au	^{195}Hg	^{196}Tl	^{197}Pb	^{198}Bi	^{199}Po	^{200}At	^{201}Rn	^{202}Fr	^{203}Ra	^{204}Ac
116	^{191}Re	^{192}Os	^{193}Ir	^{194}Pt	^{195}Au	^{196}Hg	^{197}Tl	^{198}Pb	^{199}Bi	^{200}Po	^{201}At	^{202}Rn	^{203}Fr	^{204}Ra	^{205}Ac
117	^{192}Re	^{193}Os	^{194}Ir	^{195}Pt	^{196}Au	^{197}Hg	^{198}Tl	^{199}Pb	^{200}Bi	^{201}Po	^{202}At	^{203}Rn	^{204}Fr	^{205}Ra	^{206}Ac
118	^{193}Re	^{194}Os	^{195}Ir	^{196}Pt	^{197}Au	^{198}Hg	^{199}Tl	^{200}Pb	^{201}Bi	^{202}Po	^{203}At	^{204}Rn	^{205}Fr	^{206}Ra	^{207}Ac
119	^{194}Re	^{195}Os	^{196}Ir	^{197}Pt	^{198}Au	^{199}Hg	^{200}Tl	^{201}Pb	^{202}Bi	^{203}Po	^{204}At	^{205}Rn	^{206}Fr	^{207}Ra	^{208}Ac
120	^{195}Re	^{196}Os	^{197}Ir	^{198}Pt	^{199}Au	^{200}Hg	^{201}Tl	^{202}Pb	^{203}Bi	^{204}Po	^{205}At	^{206}Rn	^{207}Fr	^{208}Ra	^{209}Ac
121	^{196}Re	^{197}Os	^{198}Ir	^{199}Pt	^{200}Au	^{201}Hg	^{202}Tl	^{203}Pb	^{204}Bi	^{205}Po	^{206}At	^{207}Rn	^{208}Fr	^{209}Ra	^{210}Ac
122	^{197}Re	^{198}Os	^{199}Ir	^{200}Pt	^{201}Au	^{202}Hg	^{203}Tl	^{204}Pb	^{205}Bi	^{206}Po	^{207}At	^{208}Rn	^{209}Fr	^{210}Ra	^{211}Ac
123	^{198}Re	^{199}Os	^{200}Ir	^{201}Pt	^{202}Au	^{203}Hg	^{204}Tl	^{205}Pb	^{206}Bi	^{207}Po	^{208}At	^{209}Rn	^{210}Fr	^{211}Ra	^{212}Ac
124	^{199}Re	^{200}Os	^{201}Ir	^{202}Pt	^{203}Au	^{204}Hg	^{205}Tl	^{206}Pb	^{207}Bi	^{208}Po	^{209}At	^{210}Rn	^{211}Fr	^{212}Ra	^{213}Ac
	125	^{201}Os	^{202}Ir	^{203}Pt	^{204}Au	^{205}Hg	^{206}Tl	^{207}Pb	^{208}Bi	^{209}Po	^{210}At	^{211}Rn	^{212}Fr	^{213}Ra	^{214}Ac
	126	^{202}Os	^{203}Ir	^{204}Pt	^{205}Au	^{206}Hg	^{207}Tl	^{208}Pb	^{209}Bi	^{210}Po	^{211}At	^{212}Rn	^{213}Fr	^{214}Ra	^{215}Ac
	127	^{203}Os	^{204}Ir	^{205}Pt	^{206}Au	^{207}Hg	^{208}Tl	^{209}Pb	^{210}Bi	^{211}Po	^{212}At	^{213}Rn	^{214}Fr	^{215}Ra	^{216}Ac
		128	^{205}Ir	^{206}Pt	^{207}Au	^{208}Hg	^{209}Tl	^{210}Pb	^{211}Bi	^{212}Po	^{213}At	^{214}Rn	^{215}Fr	^{216}Ra	^{217}Ac
			129	^{207}Pt	^{208}Au	^{209}Hg	^{210}Tl	^{211}Pb	^{212}Bi	^{213}Po	^{214}At	^{215}Rn	^{216}Fr	^{217}Ra	^{218}Ac
			130	^{208}Pt	^{209}Au	^{210}Hg	^{211}Tl	^{212}Pb	^{213}Bi	^{214}Po	^{215}At	^{216}Rn	^{217}Fr	^{218}Ra	^{219}Ac
				131	^{210}Au	^{211}Hg	^{212}Tl	^{213}Pb	^{214}Bi	^{215}Po	^{216}At	^{217}Rn	^{218}Fr	^{219}Ra	^{220}Ac
					132	^{212}Hg	^{213}Tl	^{214}Pb	^{215}Bi	^{216}Po	^{217}At	^{218}Rn	^{219}Fr	^{220}Ra	^{221}Ac
					133	^{213}Hg	^{214}Tl	^{215}Pb	^{216}Bi	^{217}Po	^{218}At	^{219}Rn	^{220}Fr	^{221}Ra	^{222}Ac
					134	^{214}Hg	^{215}Tl	^{216}Pb	^{217}Bi	^{218}Po	^{219}At	^{220}Rn	^{221}Fr	^{222}Ra	^{223}Ac
					135	^{215}Hg	^{216}Tl	^{217}Pb	^{218}Bi	^{219}Po	^{220}At	^{221}Rn	^{222}Fr	^{223}Ra	^{224}Ac
					136	^{216}Hg	^{217}Tl	^{218}Pb	^{219}Bi	^{220}Po	^{221}At	^{222}Rn	^{223}Fr	^{224}Ra	^{225}Ac
						137		^{219}Pb	^{220}Bi	^{221}Po	^{222}At	^{223}Rn	^{224}Fr	^{225}Ra	^{226}Ac
							138	^{220}Pb	^{221}Bi	^{222}Po	^{223}At	^{224}Rn	^{225}Fr	^{226}Ra	^{227}Ac
								139	^{222}Bi	^{223}Po	^{224}At	^{225}Rn	^{226}Fr	^{227}Ra	^{228}Ac
								140	^{223}Bi	^{224}Po	^{225}At	^{226}Rn	^{227}Fr	^{228}Ra	^{229}Ac
								141	^{224}Bi	^{225}Po	^{226}At	^{227}Rn	^{228}Fr	^{229}Ra	^{230}Ac
									142	^{226}Po	^{227}At	^{228}Rn	^{229}Fr	^{230}Ra	^{231}Ac
									143	^{227}Po	^{228}At	^{229}Rn	^{230}Fr	^{231}Ra	^{232}Ac
										144	^{229}At	^{230}Rn	^{231}Fr	^{232}Ra	^{233}Ac
										145	^{230}At	^{231}Rn	^{232}Fr	^{233}Ra	^{234}Ac
											146	^{232}Rn	^{233}Fr	^{234}Ra	^{235}Ac
													147		^{236}Ac
														148	

== Isotopes for elements 90-104 ==
← Previous | Next →Go to Unitized table (all elements)Go to Periodic table

Half-lives (example: Gd)
^{145}Gd	< 1 day
^{149}Gd	1–10 days
^{146}Gd	10–100 days
^{153}Gd	100 days–10 a
^{148}Gd	10–10,000 a
^{150}Gd	10 ka–700 Ma
^{152}Gd	> 700 Ma
^{158}Gd	Stable

Z →	90														
n ↓	Th														
117	^{207}Th	91													
118	^{208}Th	Pa													
119	^{209}Th	^{210}Pa													
120	^{210}Th	^{211}Pa	92												
121	^{211}Th	^{212}Pa	U												
122	^{212}Th	^{213}Pa	^{214}U												
123	^{213}Th	^{214}Pa	^{215}U												
124	^{214}Th	^{215}Pa	^{216}U	93											
125	^{215}Th	^{216}Pa	^{217}U	Np	94										
126	^{216}Th	^{217}Pa	^{218}U	^{219}Np	Pu	95									
127	^{217}Th	^{218}Pa	^{219}U	^{220}Np		Am									
128	^{218}Th	^{219}Pa													
129	^{219}Th	^{220}Pa	^{221}U	^{222}Np											
130	^{220}Th	^{221}Pa	^{222}U	^{223}Np											
131	^{221}Th	^{222}Pa	^{223}U	^{224}Np			96	97							
132	^{222}Th	^{223}Pa	^{224}U	^{225}Np	^{226}Pu		Cm	Bk							
133	^{223}Th	^{224}Pa	^{225}U	^{226}Np	^{227}Pu										
134	^{224}Th	^{225}Pa	^{226}U	^{227}Np	^{228}Pu	^{229}Am									
135	^{225}Th	^{226}Pa	^{227}U	^{228}Np	^{229}Pu	^{230}Am									
136	^{226}Th	^{227}Pa	^{228}U	^{229}Np	^{230}Pu			^{233}Bk							
137	^{227}Th	^{228}Pa	^{229}U	^{230}Np	^{231}Pu	^{232}Am	^{233}Cm	^{234}Bk	98						
138	^{228}Th	^{229}Pa	^{230}U	^{231}Np	^{232}Pu	^{233}Am	^{234}Cm		Cf	99					
139	^{229}Th	^{230}Pa	^{231}U	^{232}Np	^{233}Pu	^{234}Am	^{235}Cm	^{236}Bk	^{237}Cf	Es	100				
140	^{230}Th	^{231}Pa	^{232}U	^{233}Np	^{234}Pu	^{235}Am	^{236}Cm		^{238}Cf		Fm				
141	^{231}Th	^{232}Pa	^{233}U	^{234}Np	^{235}Pu	^{236}Am	^{237}Cm	^{238}Bk	^{239}Cf	^{240}Es	^{241}Fm	101			
142	^{232}Th	^{233}Pa	^{234}U	^{235}Np	^{236}Pu	^{237}Am	^{238}Cm		^{240}Cf	^{241}Es	^{242}Fm	Md			
143	^{233}Th	^{234}Pa	^{235}U	^{236}Np	^{237}Pu	^{238}Am	^{239}Cm	^{240}Bk	^{241}Cf	^{242}Es	^{243}Fm	^{244}Md			
144	^{234}Th	^{235}Pa	^{236}U	^{237}Np	^{238}Pu	^{239}Am	^{240}Cm	^{241}Bk	^{242}Cf	^{243}Es	^{244}Fm	^{245}Md	102		
145	^{235}Th	^{236}Pa	^{237}U	^{238}Np	^{239}Pu	^{240}Am	^{241}Cm	^{242}Bk	^{243}Cf	^{244}Es	^{245}Fm	^{246}Md	No		
146	^{236}Th	^{237}Pa	^{238}U	^{239}Np	^{240}Pu	^{241}Am	^{242}Cm	^{243}Bk	^{244}Cf	^{245}Es	^{246}Fm	^{247}Md		103	104
147	^{237}Th	^{238}Pa	^{239}U	^{240}Np	^{241}Pu	^{242}Am	^{243}Cm	^{244}Bk	^{245}Cf	^{246}Es	^{247}Fm	^{248}Md	^{249}No	Lr	Rf
148	^{238}Th	^{239}Pa	^{240}U	^{241}Np	^{242}Pu	^{243}Am	^{244}Cm	^{245}Bk	^{246}Cf	^{247}Es	^{248}Fm	^{249}Md	^{250}No	^{251}Lr	^{252}Rf
149			^{241}U	^{242}Np	^{243}Pu	^{244}Am	^{245}Cm	^{246}Bk	^{247}Cf	^{248}Es	^{249}Fm	^{250}Md	^{251}No	^{252}Lr	^{253}Rf
	150		^{242}U	^{243}Np	^{244}Pu	^{245}Am	^{246}Cm	^{247}Bk	^{248}Cf	^{249}Es	^{250}Fm	^{251}Md	^{252}No	^{253}Lr	^{254}Rf
		151		^{244}Np	^{245}Pu	^{246}Am	^{247}Cm	^{248}Bk	^{249}Cf	^{250}Es	^{251}Fm	^{252}Md	^{253}No	^{254}Lr	^{255}Rf
			152		^{246}Pu	^{247}Am	^{248}Cm	^{249}Bk	^{250}Cf	^{251}Es	^{252}Fm	^{253}Md	^{254}No	^{255}Lr	^{256}Rf
				153	^{247}Pu		^{249}Cm	^{250}Bk	^{251}Cf	^{252}Es	^{253}Fm	^{254}Md	^{255}No	^{256}Lr	^{257}Rf
					154		^{250}Cm	^{251}Bk	^{252}Cf	^{253}Es	^{254}Fm	^{255}Md	^{256}No	^{257}Lr	^{258}Rf
						155	^{251}Cm	^{252}Bk	^{253}Cf	^{254}Es	^{255}Fm	^{256}Md	^{257}No	^{258}Lr	^{259}Rf
						156		^{253}Bk	^{254}Cf	^{255}Es	^{256}Fm	^{257}Md	^{258}No	^{259}Lr	^{260}Rf
							157		^{255}Cf	^{256}Es	^{257}Fm	^{258}Md	^{259}No	^{260}Lr	^{261}Rf
								158	^{256}Cf	^{257}Es	^{258}Fm	^{259}Md	^{260}No	^{261}Lr	^{262}Rf
									159		^{259}Fm	^{260}Md		^{262}Lr	^{263}Rf
										160	^{260}Fm		^{262}No		
											161			^{264}Lr	^{265}Rf
												162			
													163	^{266}Lr	^{267}Rf
														164	

== Isotopes for elements 105-118 ==
← Previous | Next →Go to Unitized table (all elements)Go to Periodic table

Half-lives (example: Gd)
^{145}Gd	< 1 day
^{149}Gd	1–10 days
^{146}Gd	10–100 days
^{153}Gd	100 days–10 a
^{148}Gd	10–10,000 a
^{150}Gd	10 ka–700 Ma
^{152}Gd	> 700 Ma
^{158}Gd	Stable

Z →	105													
n ↓	Db													
150	^{255}Db	106												
151	^{256}Db	Sg	107											
152	^{257}Db	^{258}Sg	Bh											
153	^{258}Db	^{259}Sg	^{260}Bh	108										
154	^{259}Db	^{260}Sg	^{261}Bh	Hs	109									
155	^{260}Db	^{261}Sg	^{262}Bh	^{263}Hs	Mt	110								
156	^{261}Db	^{262}Sg		^{264}Hs		Ds								
157	^{262}Db	^{263}Sg	^{264}Bh	^{265}Hs	^{266}Mt	^{267}Ds								
158	^{263}Db	^{264}Sg	^{265}Bh	^{266}Hs										
159		^{265}Sg	^{266}Bh	^{267}Hs	^{268}Mt	^{269}Ds	111							
160		^{266}Sg	^{267}Bh	^{268}Hs		^{270}Ds	Rg							
161	^{266}Db	^{267}Sg		^{269}Hs	^{270}Mt	^{271}Ds	^{272}Rg							
162	^{267}Db	^{268}Sg		^{270}Hs				112						
163	^{268}Db	^{269}Sg	^{270}Bh	^{271}Hs		^{273}Ds	^{274}Rg	Cn	113					
164			^{271}Bh	^{272}Hs					Nh					
165	^{270}Db	^{271}Sg	^{272}Bh	^{273}Hs	^{274}Mt	^{275}Ds		^{277}Cn	^{278}Nh					
	166				^{275}Mt	^{276}Ds								
	167		^{274}Bh	^{275}Hs	^{276}Mt	^{277}Ds	^{278}Rg							
		168			^{277}Mt		^{279}Rg	^{280}Cn		114				
		169		^{277}Hs	^{278}Mt	^{279}Ds	^{280}Rg	^{281}Cn	^{282}Nh	Fl	115			
		170				^{280}Ds	^{281}Rg	^{282}Cn	^{283}Nh	^{284}Fl	Mc	116		
		171				^{281}Ds	^{282}Rg	^{283}Cn	^{284}Nh	^{285}Fl	^{286}Mc	Lv		
			172					^{284}Cn	^{285}Nh	^{286}Fl	^{287}Mc	^{288}Lv	117	
				173				^{285}Cn	^{286}Nh	^{287}Fl	^{288}Mc	^{289}Lv	Ts	118
					174					^{288}Fl	^{289}Mc	^{290}Lv		Og
						175				^{289}Fl	^{290}Mc	^{291}Lv		
							176					^{292}Lv	^{293}Ts	^{294}Og
								177				^{293}Lv	^{294}Ts	
