= Isotopes of indium =

Isotopes of indium (_{49}In)
Main isotopes			Decay	
Isotope	abundance	half-life (t_{1/2})	mode	product
^{111}In	synth	2.8048 d	ε	^{111}Cd
^{113}In	4.28%	stable		
^{114m}In	synth	49.51 d	IT96.8%	^{114}In
^{114m}In	synth	49.51 d	β^{+}3.25%	^{114}Cd
^{115}In	95.7%	4.41×10^{14} y	β^{−}	^{115}Sn

Standard atomic weight A_{r}°(In)
- 114.818±0.001; 114.82±0.01 (abridged)

Indium (_{49}In) consists of two primordial nuclides, with the most common (95.7%) nuclide (^{115}In) being measurably though weakly radioactive. Its spin-forbidden decay has a half-life of 4.41×10^{14} years, much longer than the currently accepted age of the Universe.

The stable isotope ^{113}In is only 4.3% of naturally occurring indium. Among elements with a known stable isotope, only tellurium and rhenium also have all stable isotopes in lower abundance than a long-lived radioactive isotope, but the discrepancy is not so striking. Other than ^{115}In, the longest-lived radioisotope is ^{111}In, with a half-life of 2.8048 days. All other radioisotopes have half-lives less than 5 hours. This element also has 47 isomers, the longest-lived being ^{114m1}In, with a half-life of 49.51 days. All other meta-states have half-lives also less than 5 hours.

Indium-111 is used medically in nuclear imaging, as a radiotracer nuclide tag for gamma camera localization of protein radiopharmaceuticals, such as In-111-labeled octreotide, which binds to receptors on certain endocrine tumors (Octreoscan). Indium-111 is also used in indium white blood cell scans, which use nuclear medical techniques to search for hidden infections.

Several proton-rich isotopes of indium have been used to help measure the mass of the doubly-magic isotope tin-100.

== List of isotopes ==
Nuclide (Note: ^{m}In – Excited nuclear isomer.)	Z	N	Isotopic mass (Da) (Note: ( ) – Uncertainty (1σ) is given in concise form in parentheses after the corresponding last digits.) (Note: # – Atomic mass marked #: value and uncertainty derived not from purely experimental data, but at least partly from trends from the Mass Surface (TMS).)	Discovery year	Half-life (Note: # – Values marked # are not purely derived from experimental data, but at least partly from trends of neighboring nuclides (TNN).)	Decay mode (Note: Modes of decay: EC: / Electron capture; IT: / Isomeric transition; n: / Neutron emission; p: / Proton emission)	Daughter isotope (Note: Bold italics symbol as daughter – Daughter product is nearly stable.) (Note: Bold symbol as daughter – Daughter product is stable.)	Spin and parity (Note: ( ) spin value – Indicates spin with weak assignment arguments.)	Natural abundance (mole fraction)	
Nuclide	Excitation energy			Discovery year	Half-life	Decay mode	Daughter isotope	Spin and parity	Normal proportion	Range of variation
^{96}In	49	47	95.95911(54)#	2016	1# ms [>400 ns]	β^{+}?	^{96}Cd	9/2+#		
^{96}In	49	47	95.95911(54)#	2016	1# ms [>400 ns]	p?	^{95}Cd	9/2+#		
^{97}In	49	48	96.94913(43)#	2012	36(6) ms	β^{+} (97.7%)	^{97}Cd	9/2+#		
^{97}In	49	48	96.94913(43)#	2012	36(6) ms	β^{+}, p (2.3%)	^{96}Ag	9/2+#		
^{97}In	49	48	96.94913(43)#	2012	36(6) ms	p?	^{96}Cd	9/2+#		
^{97m}In	400(100)# keV			2018	0.12(7) ms	p?	^{96}Cd	1/2−#		
^{98}In	49	49	97.94213(33)#	1994	30(1) ms	β^{+} (>99.87%)	^{98}Cd	(0+)		
^{98}In	49	49	97.94213(33)#	1994	30(1) ms	β^{+}, p (<0.13%)	^{97}Ag	(0+)		
^{98m}In (Note: Order of ground state and isomer is uncertain.)	820(730) keV			2001	890(20) ms	β^{+} (56%)	^{98}Cd	(9+)		
^{98m}In	820(730) keV			2001	890(20) ms	β^{+}, p (44%)	^{97}Ag	(9+)		
^{99}In	49	50	98.93411(32)#	1994	3.11(6) s	β^{+} (99.71%)	^{99}Cd	9/2+#		
^{99}In	49	50	98.93411(32)#	1994	3.11(6) s	β^{+}, p (0.29%)	^{98}Ag	9/2+#		
^{99m}In	671(37) keV			2023	1 s#			1/2−#		
^{100}In	49	51	99.9311019(24)	1982	5.62(6) s	β^{+} (98.34%)	^{100}Cd	6+#		
^{100}In	49	51	99.9311019(24)	1982	5.62(6) s	β^{+}, p (1.66%)	^{99}Ag	6+#		
^{101}In	49	52	100.926414(13)	1988	15.1(11) s	β^{+} (>98.3%)	^{101}Cd	(9/2+)		
^{101}In	49	52	100.926414(13)	1988	15.1(11) s	β^{+}, p (<1.7%)	^{100}Ag	(9/2+)		
^{101m}In	640(40) keV			2019	10# s	β^{+}?	^{101}Cd	1/2−#		
^{101m}In	640(40) keV			2019	10# s	IT?	^{101}In	1/2−#		
^{102}In	49	53	101.9241059(49)	1981	23.3(1) s	β^{+} (99.99%)	^{102}Cd	(6+)		
^{102}In	49	53	101.9241059(49)	1981	23.3(1) s	β^{+}, p (0.0093%)	^{101}Ag	(6+)		
^{103}In	49	54	102.9198788(96)	1978	60(1) s	β^{+}	^{103}Cd	(9/2+)		
^{103m}In	631.7(1) keV			1997	34(2) s	β^{+} (67%)	^{103}Cd	(1/2−)		
^{103m}In	631.7(1) keV			1997	34(2) s	IT (33%)	^{103}In	(1/2−)		
^{104}In	49	55	103.9182145(62)	1977	1.80(3) min	β^{+}	^{104}Cd	(5+)		
^{104m}In	93.48(10) keV			1988	15.7(5) s	IT (80%)	^{104}In	(3+)		
^{104m}In	93.48(10) keV			1988	15.7(5) s	β^{+} (20%)	^{104}Cd	(3+)		
^{105}In	49	56	104.914502(11)	1975	5.07(7) min	β^{+}	^{105}Cd	9/2+		
^{105m}In	674.09(25) keV			1975	48(6) s	IT	^{105}In	(1/2)−		
^{105m}In	674.09(25) keV			1975	48(6) s	β^{+}?	^{105}Cd	(1/2)−		
^{106}In	49	57	105.9134636(13)	1962	6.2(1) min	β^{+}	^{106}Cd	7+		
^{106m}In	28.6(3) keV			1966	5.2(1) min	β^{+}	^{106}Cd	(2)+		
^{107}In	49	58	106.910287(10)	1949	32.4(3) min	β^{+}	^{107}Cd	9/2+		
^{107m}In	678.5(3) keV			1973	50.4(6) s	IT	^{107}In	1/2−		
^{108}In	49	59	107.9096937(93)	1949	58.0(12) min	β^{+}	^{108}Cd	7+		
^{108m}In	29.75(5) keV			1962	39.6(7) min	β^{+}	^{108}Cd	2+		
^{109}In	49	60	108.9071497(43)	1948	4.159(10) h	β^{+}	^{109}Cd	9/2+		
^{109m1}In	649.79(10) keV			1966	1.34(6) min	IT	^{109}In	1/2−		
^{109m2}In	2101.86(11) keV			1965	210.0(9) ms	IT	^{109}In	19/2+		
^{110}In	49	61	109.907171(12)	1939	4.92(8) h	β^{+}	^{110}Cd	7+		
^{110m}In	62.08(4) keV			1951	69.1(5) min	β^{+}	^{110}Cd	2+		
^{111}In (Note: Used in medical applications)	49	62	110.9051072(37)	1947	2.8048(1) d	EC	^{111}Cd	9/2+		
^{111m}In	536.99(7) keV			1966	7.7(2) min	IT	^{111}In	1/2−		
^{112}In	49	63	111.9055387(46)	1947	14.88(15) min	β^{+} (62%)	^{112}Cd	1+		
^{112}In	49	63	111.9055387(46)	1947	14.88(15) min	β^{−} (38%)	^{112}Sn	1+		
^{112m1}In	156.592(25) keV			1947	20.67(8) min	IT	^{112}In	4+		
^{112m2}In	350.80(5) keV			1976	690(50) ns	IT	^{112}In	(7)+		
^{112m3}In	613.82(6) keV			1976	2.81(3) μs	IT	^{112}In	8−		
^{113}In (Note: Fission product)	49	64	112.90406045(20)	1934	Stable			9/2+	0.04281(52)	
^{113m}In	391.699(3) keV			1939	1.6579(4) h	IT	^{113}In	1/2−		
^{114}In	49	65	113.90491641(32)	1937	71.9(1) s	β^{−} (99.50%)	^{114}Sn	1+		
^{114}In	49	65	113.90491641(32)	1937	71.9(1) s	β^{+} (0.50%)	^{114}Cd	1+		
^{114m1}In	190.2682(8) keV			1940	49.51(1) d	IT (96.75%)	^{114}In	5+		
^{114m1}In	190.2682(8) keV			1940	49.51(1) d	β^{+} (3.25%)	^{114}Cd	5+		
^{114m2}In	501.948(3) keV			1958	43.1(6) ms	IT	^{114m1}In	8−		
^{115}In (Note: Primordial radionuclide)	49	66	114.903878772(12)	1924	4.41(25)×10^{14} y	β^{−}	^{115}Sn	9/2+	0.95719(52)	
^{115m}In	336.244(17) keV			1939	4.486(4) h	IT (95.0%)	^{115}In	1/2−		
^{115m}In	336.244(17) keV			1939	4.486(4) h	β^{−} (5.0%)	^{115}Sn	1/2−		
^{116}In	49	67	115.90525999(24)	1937	14.10(3) s	β^{−} (99.98%)	^{116}Sn	1+		
^{116}In	49	67	115.90525999(24)	1937	14.10(3) s	EC (0.0237%)	^{116}Cd	1+		
^{116m1}In	127.267(6) keV			1937	54.29(17) min	β^{−}	^{116}Sn	5+		
^{116m2}In	289.660(6) keV			1960	2.18(4) s	IT	^{116m1}In	8−		
^{117}In	49	68	116.9045157(52)	1937	43.2(3) min	β^{−}	^{117}Sn	9/2+		
^{117m}In	315.303(11) keV			1955	116.2(3) min	β^{−} (52.9%)	^{117}Sn	1/2−		
^{117m}In	315.303(11) keV			1955	116.2(3) min	IT (47.1%)	^{117}In	1/2−		
^{118}In	49	69	117.9063567(83)	1949	5.0(5) s	β^{−}	^{118}Sn	1+		
^{118m1}In	100(50)# keV			1961	4.364(7) min	β^{−}	^{118}Sn	5+		
^{118m2}In	240(50)# keV			1969	8.5(3) s	IT (98.6%)	^{118m1}In	8−		
^{118m2}In	240(50)# keV			1969	8.5(3) s	β^{−} (1.4%)	^{118}Sn	8−		
^{119}In	49	70	118.9058516(78)	1949	2.4(1) min	β^{−}	^{119}Sn	9/2+		
^{119m1}In	311.37(3) keV			1960	18.0(3) min	β^{−} (97.4%)	^{119}Sn	1/2−		
^{119m1}In	311.37(3) keV			1960	18.0(3) min	IT (2.6%)	^{119}In	1/2−		
^{119m2}In	654.27(7) keV			1974	130(15) ns	IT	^{119}In	(3/2)+		
^{119m3}In	2656.9(18) keV			2002	265(10) ns	IT	^{119}In	(25/2+)		
^{120}In	49	71	119.9079875(33)	1958	3.08(8) s	β^{−}	^{120}Sn	1+		
^{120m1}In	90.1(26) keV			1960	46.2(8) s	β^{−}	^{120}Sn	5+		
^{120m2}In (Note: Order of isomers is uncertain.)	90.1(26) keV			1978	47.3(5) s	β^{−}	^{120}Sn	8−		
^{121}In	49	72	120.9078416(13)	1960	23.1(6) s	β^{−}	^{121}Sn	9/2+		
^{121m1}In	313.68(7) keV			1960	3.88(10) min	β^{−} (98.8%)	^{121}Sn	1/2−		
^{121m1}In	313.68(7) keV			1960	3.88(10) min	IT (1.2%)	^{121}In	1/2−		
^{121m2}In	2550(100)# keV			2010	7.3(2) μs	IT	^{121}In	(25/2+)		
^{122}In	49	73	121.9103046(13)	1963	10.3(6) s	β^{−}	^{122}Sn	5+		
^{122m1}In	<15 keV			1971	10.8(4) s	β^{−}	^{122}Sn	8−		
^{122m2}In	77.2(15) keV			1979	1.5(3) s	β^{−}	^{122}Sn	1+		
^{123}In	49	74	122.9104679(12)	1960	6.17(5) s	β^{−}	^{123}Sn	9/2+		
^{123m1}In	327.21(4) keV			1960	47.4(4) s	β^{−}	^{123m1}Sn	1/2−		
^{123m2}In	2078.1(6) keV			2004	1.4(2) μs	IT	^{123}In	(17/2−)		
^{123m3}In	2103(14)# keV			2010	>100 μs	IT	^{123}In	(21/2−)		
^{124}In	49	75	123.9131390(34)	1974	3.67(3) s	β^{−}	^{124}Sn	8−		
^{124m}In	24.2(26) keV			1964	3.12(9) s	β^{−}	^{124}Sn	3+		
^{125}In	49	76	124.9136738(19)	1967	2.36(4) s	β^{−}	^{125}Sn	9/2+		
^{125m1}In	352(12) keV			1983	12.2(2) s	β^{−}	^{125m1}Sn	1/2−		
^{125m2}In	2009.4(7) keV			2004	9.4(6) μs	IT	^{125}In	(19/2+)		
^{125m3}In	2161.2(9) keV			2004	5.0(15) ms	IT	^{125}In	(23/2−)		
^{126}In	49	77	125.9164682(45)	1974	1.53(1) s	β^{−}	^{126}Sn	3+		
^{126m1}In	90(7) keV			1979	1.64(5) s	β^{−}	^{126}Sn	8−		
^{126m2}In	243.3(2) keV			2004	22(2) μs	IT	^{126}In	1−		
^{127}In	49	78	126.9174539(14)	1975	1.086(7) s	β^{−} (>99.97%)	^{127}Sn	9/2+		
^{127}In	49	78	126.9174539(14)	1975	1.086(7) s	β^{−}, n (<0.03%)	^{126}Sn	9/2+		
^{127m1}In	407.9(50) keV			1975	3.618(21) s	β^{−} (99.30%)	^{127}Sn	1/2−#		
^{127m1}In	407.9(50) keV			1975	3.618(21) s	β^{−}, n (0.70%)	^{126}Sn	1/2−#		
^{127m2}In	1728.7(12) keV			2004	1.04(10) s	β^{−}	^{127}Sn	(21/2−)		
^{127m2}In	1728.7(12) keV			2004	1.04(10) s	β^{−}, n?	^{126}Sn	(21/2−)		
^{127m3}In	2364.7(9) keV			2004	9(2) μs	IT	^{127}In	(29/2+)		
^{128}In	49	79	127.9203536(14)	1975	816(27) ms	β^{−} (99.96%)	^{128}Sn	(3)+		
^{128}In	49	79	127.9203536(14)	1975	816(27) ms	β^{−}, n (0.038%)	^{127}Sn	(3)+		
^{128m1}In	247.87(10) keV			2004	23(2) μs	IT	^{128}In	(1)−		
^{128m2}In	285.1(22) keV			1986	720(100) ms	β^{−}	^{128}Sn	(8−)		
^{128m2}In	285.1(22) keV			1986	720(100) ms	IT?	^{128}In	(8−)		
^{128m2}In	285.1(22) keV			1986	720(100) ms	β^{−}, n?	^{127}Sn	(8−)		
^{128m3}In	1797.6(16) keV			2020	>0.3 s	β^{−}	^{128}Sn	(16+)		
^{128m3}In	1797.6(16) keV			2020	>0.3 s	IT?	^{128}In	(16+)		
^{128m3}In	1797.6(16) keV			2020	>0.3 s	β^{−}, n?	^{127}Sn	(16+)		
^{129}In	49	80	128.9218085(21)	1975	570(10) ms	β^{−} (99.77%)	^{129}Sn	9/2+		
^{129}In	49	80	128.9218085(21)	1975	570(10) ms	β^{−}, n (0.23%)	^{128}Sn	9/2+		
^{129m1}In	449.1(59) keV			1976	1.23(3) s	β^{−} (96.2%)	^{129}Sn	1/2−		
^{129m1}In	449.1(59) keV			1976	1.23(3) s	β^{−}, n (3.6%)	^{128}Sn	1/2−		
^{129m1}In	449.1(59) keV			1976	1.23(3) s	IT?	^{129}In	1/2−		
^{129m2}In	1646.6(33) keV			2004	670(100) ms	β^{−}	^{129}Sn	(23/2−)		
^{129m2}In	1646.6(33) keV			2004	670(100) ms	IT?	^{129}In	(23/2−)		
^{129m3}In	1687.97(25) keV			2003	11.2(2) μs	IT	^{129}In	(17/2−)		
^{129m4}In	1927.6(33) keV			2021	110(15) ms	IT	^{129}In	(29/2+)		
^{129m4}In	1927.6(33) keV			2021	110(15) ms	β^{−}?	^{129}Sn	(29/2+)		
^{130}In	49	81	129.9249523(19)	1973	273(5) ms	β^{−} (99.07%)	^{130}Sn	1(−)		
^{130}In	49	81	129.9249523(19)	1973	273(5) ms	β^{−}, n (0.93%)	^{129}Sn	1(−)		
^{130m1}In	66.5(27) keV			1981	540(10) ms	β^{−} (98.20%)	^{130}Sn	(10-)		
^{130m1}In	66.5(27) keV			1981	540(10) ms	β^{−}, n (1.80%)	^{129}Sn	(10-)		
^{130m2}In	385.4(26) keV			1981	540(10) ms	β^{−} (98.20%)	^{130}Sn	(5+)		
^{130m2}In	385.4(26) keV			1981	540(10) ms	β^{−}, n (1.80%)	^{129}Sn	(5+)		
^{130m3}In	388.3(2) keV			2004	4.6(2) μs	IT	^{130}In	(3+)		
^{131}In	49	82	130.9269728(24)	1976	261.5(28) ms	β^{−} (97.75%)	^{131}Sn	9/2+		
^{131}In	49	82	130.9269728(24)	1976	261.5(28) ms	β^{−}, n (2.25%)	^{130}Sn	9/2+		
^{131m1}In	376(3) keV			1980	328(15) ms	β^{−} (97.75%)	^{131}Sn	1/2−		
^{131m1}In	376(3) keV			1980	328(15) ms	β^{−}, n (2.25%)	^{130}Sn	1/2−		
^{131m1}In	376(3) keV			1980	328(15) ms	IT?	^{131}In	1/2−		
^{131m2}In	3750(90) keV			1984	322(41) ms	β^{−} (88%)	^{131}Sn	(21/2+)		
^{131m2}In	3750(90) keV			1984	322(41) ms	β^{−}, n (12%)	^{130}Sn	(21/2+)		
^{131m2}In	3750(90) keV			1984	322(41) ms	IT?	^{131}In	(21/2+)		
^{131m3}In	3783.6(5) keV			2009	669(34) ns	IT	^{131}In	(17/2+)		
^{132}In	49	83	131.932998(64)	1973	202.2(2) ms	β^{−} (87.7%)	^{132}Sn	(7−)		
^{132}In	49	83	131.932998(64)	1973	202.2(2) ms	β^{−}, n (12.3%)	^{131}Sn	(7−)		
^{132}In	49	83	131.932998(64)	1973	202.2(2) ms	β^{−}, 2n?	^{130}Sn	(7−)		
^{133}In	49	84	132.93807(22)#	1996	163.0(16) ms	β^{−}, n (85%)	^{132}Sn	(9/2+)		
^{133}In	49	84	132.93807(22)#	1996	163.0(16) ms	β^{−} (15%)	^{133}Sn	(9/2+)		
^{133}In	49	84	132.93807(22)#	1996	163.0(16) ms	β^{−}, 2n?	^{131}Sn	(9/2+)		
^{133m}In	330(40)# keV			2000	167(11) ms	β^{−}, n (93%)	^{132}Sn	(1/2−)		
^{133m}In	330(40)# keV			2000	167(11) ms	β^{−} (7%)	^{133}Sn	(1/2−)		
^{134}In	49	85	133.94421(22)#	1996	140(4) ms	β^{−}, n (65%)	^{133}Sn	7−#		
^{134}In	49	85	133.94421(22)#	1996	140(4) ms	β^{−}?	^{134}Sn	7−#		
^{134}In	49	85	133.94421(22)#	1996	140(4) ms	β^{−}, 2n (<4%)	^{132}Sn	7−#		
^{134m}In	56.7(1) keV			2019	3.5(4) μs	IT	^{134}In	(5−)		
^{135}In	49	86	134.94943(32)#	2002	103(3) ms	β^{−}	^{135}Sn	9/2+#		
^{135}In	49	86	134.94943(32)#	2002	103(3) ms	β^{−}, n?	^{134}Sn	9/2+#		
^{135}In	49	86	134.94943(32)#	2002	103(3) ms	β^{−}, 2n?	^{133}Sn	9/2+#		
^{136}In	49	87	135.95602(32)#	2015	86(9) ms	β^{−}	^{136}Sn	7−#		
^{136}In	49	87	135.95602(32)#	2015	86(9) ms	β^{−}, n?	^{135}Sn	7−#		
^{136}In	49	87	135.95602(32)#	2015	86(9) ms	β^{−}, 2n?	^{134}Sn	7−#		
^{137}In	49	88	136.96154(43)#	2015	70(40) ms	β^{−}	^{137}Sn	9/2+#		
^{137}In	49	88	136.96154(43)#	2015	70(40) ms	β^{−}, n?	^{136}Sn	9/2+#		
^{137}In	49	88	136.96154(43)#	2015	70(40) ms	β^{−}, 2n?	^{135}Sn	9/2+#		
This table header & footer:

== See also ==
Daughter products other than indium

- Isotopes of tin
- Isotopes of cadmium
- Isotopes of silver
