= Isotopes of cadmium =

Isotopes of cadmium (_{48}Cd)
Main isotopes			Decay	
Isotope	abundance	half-life (t_{1/2})	mode	product
^{106}Cd	1.25%	stable		
^{108}Cd	0.89%	stable		
^{109}Cd	synth	461.3 d	ε	^{109}Ag
^{110}Cd	12.5%	stable		
^{111}Cd	12.8%	stable		
^{112}Cd	24.1%	stable		
^{113}Cd	12.2%	8.04×10^{15} y	β^{−}	^{113}In
^{113m}Cd	synth	13.9 y	β^{−}	^{113}In
^{113m}Cd	synth	13.9 y	IT	^{113}Cd
^{114}Cd	28.8%	stable		
^{115m}Cd	synth	44.56 d	β^{−}	^{115}In
^{116}Cd	7.51%	2.69×10^{19} y	β^{−}β^{−}	^{116}Sn

Standard atomic weight A_{r}°(Cd)
- 112.414±0.004; 112.41±0.01 (abridged)

Naturally occurring cadmium (_{48}Cd) is composed of 8 isotopes. For two of them, natural radioactivity has been observed, and three others are predicted to possibly decay though this has not been observed; it may be presumed the half-lives are extremely long. The two natural radioactive isotopes are ^{113}Cd (beta decay, half-life 8.04×10^{15} years) and ^{116}Cd (double beta decay, half-life 2.69×10^{19} years). The other three are ^{106}Cd, ^{108}Cd (double electron capture), and ^{114}Cd (double beta decay); only lower limits on their decays have been set. Only three isotopes—^{110}Cd, ^{111}Cd, and ^{112}Cd—are theoretically stable. Among the isotopes absent in natural cadmium, the most long-lived are ^{109}Cd with a half-life of 461.3 days, and ^{115}Cd with a half-life of 53.46 hours. All of the remaining radioactive isotopes have half-lives that are less than 7 hours and the majority of these are less than 5 minutes. This element also has 12 known meta states, with the most stable being ^{113m}Cd (t_{1/2} 13.9 years), ^{115m}Cd (t_{1/2} 44.6 days) and ^{117m}Cd (t_{1/2} 3.44 hours).

The known isotopes of cadmium range from ^{95}Cd to ^{132}Cd. The primary decay mode before the stable isotope ^{112}Cd is electron capture to isotopes of silver, and after, beta emission to isotopes of indium.

A 2021 study has shown at high ionic strengths, cadmium isotope fractionation mainly depends on its complexation with carboxylic sites. At low ionic strengths, nonspecific cadmium binding induced by electrostatic attractions plays a dominant role and promotes cadmium isotope fractionation during complexation.

== List of isotopes ==
Nuclide (Note: ^{m}Cd – Excited nuclear isomer.)	Z	N	Isotopic mass (Da) (Note: ( ) – Uncertainty (1σ) is given in concise form in parentheses after the corresponding last digits.) (Note: # – Atomic mass marked #: value and uncertainty derived not from purely experimental data, but at least partly from trends from the Mass Surface (TMS).)	Discovery year	Half-life (Note: Bold half-life – nearly stable, half-life longer than age of universe.)	Decay mode (Note: Modes of decay: EC: / Electron capture; IT: / Isomeric transition; n: / Neutron emission; p: / Proton emission)	Daughter isotope (Note: Bold italics symbol as daughter – Daughter product is nearly stable.) (Note: Bold symbol as daughter – Daughter product is stable.)	Spin and parity (Note: ( ) spin value – Indicates spin with weak assignment arguments.) (Note: # – Values marked # are not purely derived from experimental data, but at least partly from trends of neighboring nuclides (TNN).)	Natural abundance (mole fraction)	
Nuclide	Excitation energy			Discovery year	Half-life	Decay mode	Daughter isotope	Spin and parity	Normal proportion	Range of variation
^{94}Cd	48	46	93.95659(54)#	2016	80# ms [> 760 ns]			0+		
^{95}Cd	48	47	94.94948(61)#	2012	32(3) ms	β^{+} (95.4%)	^{95}Ag	9/2+#		
^{95}Cd	48	47	94.94948(61)#	2012	32(3) ms	β^{+}, p (4.6%)	^{94}Pd	9/2+#		
^{96}Cd	48	48	95.94034(44)#	2008	1.003(47) s	β^{+} (98.4%)	^{96}Ag	0+		
^{96}Cd	48	48	95.94034(44)#	2008	1.003(47) s	β^{+}, p (1.6%)	^{95}Pd	0+		
^{96m1}Cd	6000(1400) keV			2019	511(26) ms	β^{+} (84.6%)	^{96}Ag	16+		
^{96m1}Cd	6000(1400) keV			2019	511(26) ms	β^{+}, p (15.4%)	^{95}Pd	16+		
^{96m2}Cd	5605(5) keV			2011	198(18) ns	IT	^{96}Cd	(12−,13−)		
^{97}Cd	48	49	96.93480(45)	1978	1.16(5) s	β^{+} (92.6%)	^{97}Ag	(9/2+)		
^{97}Cd	48	49	96.93480(45)	1978	1.16(5) s	β^{+}, p (7.4%)	^{96}Pd	(9/2+)		
^{97m1}Cd	1245.1(2) keV			2019	730(70) μs	IT	^{97}Cd	(1/2−)		
^{97m2}Cd	2620(580) keV			2011	3.86(6) s	β^{+} (74.9%)	^{97}Ag	(25/2+)		
^{97m2}Cd	2620(580) keV			2011	3.86(6) s	β^{+}, p (25.1%)	^{96}Pd	(25/2+)		
^{98}Cd	48	50	97.927389(56)	1978	9.29(10) s	β^{+} (>99.97%)	^{98}Ag	0+		
^{98}Cd	48	50	97.927389(56)	1978	9.29(10) s	β^{+}, p (<0.029%)	^{97}Pd	0+		
^{98m1}Cd	2428.3(4) keV			1997	154(16) ns	IT	^{98}Cd	(8+)		
^{98m2}Cd	6635(2) keV			2004	224(5) ns	IT	^{98}Cd	(12+)		
^{99}Cd	48	51	98.9249258(17)	1978	17(1) s	β^{+} (99.79%)	^{99}Ag	5/2+#		
^{99}Cd	48	51	98.9249258(17)	1978	17(1) s	β^{+}, p (0.21%)	^{98}Pd	5/2+#		
^{99}Cd	48	51	98.9249258(17)	1978	17(1) s	β^{+}, α (<10^{−4}%)	^{95}Rh	5/2+#		
^{100}Cd	48	52	99.9203488(18)	1970	49.1(5) s	β^{+}	^{100}Ag	0+		
^{101}Cd	48	53	100.9185862(16)	1969	1.36(5) min	β^{+}	^{101}Ag	5/2+		
^{102}Cd	48	54	101.9144818(18)	1969	5.5(5) min	β^{+}	^{102}Ag	0+		
^{103}Cd	48	55	102.9134169(19)	1960	7.3(1) min	β^{+}	^{103}Ag	5/2+		
^{104}Cd	48	56	103.9098562(18)	1955	57.7(10) min	β^{+}	^{104}Ag	0+		
^{105}Cd	48	57	104.9094639(15)	1950	55.5(4) min	β^{+}	^{105}Ag	5/2+		
^{105m}Cd	2517.6(5) keV			1978	4.5(5) μs	IT	^{105}Cd	(21/2+)		
^{106}Cd	48	58	105.9064598(12)	1934	Observationally stable (Note: Believed to decay by β^{+}β^{+} to ^{106}Pd with a half-life over 1.1×10^{21} years)			0+	0.01245(22)	
^{107}Cd	48	59	106.9066120(18)	1946	6.50(2) h	β^{+}	^{107}Ag	5/2+		
^{108}Cd	48	60	107.9041836(12)	1934	Observationally stable (Note: Believed to decay by β^{+}β^{+} to ^{108}Pd with a half-life over 4.1×10^{17} years)			0+	0.00888(11)	
^{109}Cd	48	61	108.9049867(16)	1950	461.3(5) d	EC	^{109}Ag	5/2+		
^{109m1}Cd	59.60(7) keV			1964	11.8(16) μs	IT	^{109}Cd	1/2+		
^{109m2}Cd	463.10(11) keV			1966	10.6(4) μs	IT	^{109}Cd	11/2−		
^{110}Cd	48	62	109.90300747(41)	1924	Stable			0+	0.12470(61)	
^{111}Cd (Note: Fission product)	48	63	110.90418378(38)	1924	Stable			1/2+	0.12795(12)	
^{111m}Cd	396.214(21) keV			1951	48.50(9) min	IT	^{111}Cd	11/2−		
^{112}Cd	48	64	111.90276390(27)	1924	Stable			0+	0.24109(7)	
^{113}Cd (Note: Primordial radionuclide)	48	65	112.90440811(26)	1924	8.04(5)×10^{15} y	β^{−}	^{113}In	1/2+	0.12227(7)	
^{113m}Cd	263.54(3) keV			1959	13.89(11) y	β^{−} (99.90%)	^{113}In	11/2−		
^{113m}Cd	263.54(3) keV			1959	13.89(11) y	IT (0.0964%)	^{113}Cd	11/2−		
^{114}Cd	48	66	113.90336500(30)	1924	Observationally stable (Note: Believed to undergo β^{−}β^{−} decay to ^{114}Sn with a half-life over 9.2×10^{16} years)			0+	0.28754(81)	
^{115}Cd	48	67	114.90543743(70)	1939	53.46(5) h	β^{−}	^{115m}In	1/2+		
^{115}Cd	48	67	114.90543743(70)	1939	53.46(5) h	β^{−} (8.0×10^{−5}%)	^{115}In (Note: Parent isotope has a branching ratio of 0.013% to decay the (1/2^{+},3/2) state of ^{115}In at 1192.491 keV, which has a branching ratio of 0.61% to deexcites to ^{115}In and a branching ratio of 99.39% to deexcites to ^{115m}In.)	1/2+		
^{115m}Cd	181.0(5) keV			1947	44.56(24) d	β^{−} (98.3%)	^{115}In	11/2−		
^{115m}Cd	181.0(5) keV			1947	44.56(24) d	β^{−} (1.7%)	^{115m}In (Note: Parent isotope has a branching ratio of 1.7% to decay the 7/2^{+} state of ^{115}In at 933.838 keV which has a branching ratio of 100% to deexcites to ^{115m}In_{.}.)	11/2−		
^{116}Cd	48	68	115.90476323(17)	1924	2.69(9)×10^{19} y	β^{−}β^{−}	^{116}Sn	0+	0.07512(54)	
^{117}Cd	48	69	116.9072260(11)	1939	2.503(5) h	β^{−}	^{117}In	1/2+		
^{117m}Cd	136.4(2) keV			1966	3.441(9) h	β^{−}	^{117}In	11/2−		
^{118}Cd	48	70	117.906922(21)	1961	50.3(2) min	β^{−}	^{118}In	0+		
^{119}Cd	48	71	118.909847(40)	1961	2.69(2) min	β^{−}	^{119}In	1/2+		
^{119m}Cd	146.54(11) keV			1974	2.20(2) min	β^{−}	^{119}In	11/2−		
^{120}Cd	48	72	119.9098681(40)	1971	50.80(21) s	β^{−}	^{120}In	0+		
^{121}Cd	48	73	120.9129637(21)	1965	13.5(3) s	β^{−}	^{121}In	3/2+		
^{121m}Cd	214.86(15) keV			1974	8.3(8) s	β^{−}	^{121}In	11/2−		
^{122}Cd	48	74	121.9134591(25)	1973	5.98(10) s	β^{−}	^{122}In	0+		
^{123}Cd	48	75	122.9168925(29)	1983	2.10(2) s	β^{−}	^{123}In	3/2+		
^{123m}Cd	143(4) keV			1986	1.82(3) s	β^{−} (?%)	^{123}In	11/2−		
^{123m}Cd	143(4) keV			1986	1.82(3) s	IT (?%)	^{123}Cd	11/2−		
^{124}Cd	48	76	123.9176598(28)	1974	1.25(2) s	β^{−}	^{124}In	0+		
^{125}Cd	48	77	124.9212576(31)	1986	680(40) ms	β^{−}	^{125}In	3/2+		
^{125m1}Cd	186(4) keV			1989	480(30) ms	β^{−}	^{125}In	11/2−		
^{125m2}Cd	1648(4) keV			2012	19(3) μs	IT	^{125}Cd	(19/2+)		
^{126}Cd	48	78	125.9224303(25)	1978	512(5) ms	β^{−}	^{126}In	0+		
^{127}Cd	48	79	126.9262033(67)	1986	480(100) ms	β^{−}	^{127}In	3/2+		
^{127m1}Cd	285(8) keV			2013	360(40) ms	β^{−}	^{127}In	11/2−		
^{127m2}Cd	1845(8) keV			2010	17.5(3) μs	IT	^{127}Cd	(19/2+)		
^{128}Cd	48	80	127.9278168(69)	1986	246(2) ms	β^{−}	^{128}In	0+		
^{128m1}Cd	1870.5(3) keV			2009	270(7) ns	IT	^{128}Cd	(5−)		
^{128m2}Cd	2714.6(4) keV			2009	3.56(6) μs	IT	^{128}Cd	(10+)		
^{128m3}Cd	4286.6(15) keV			2017	6.3(8) ms	IT	^{128}Cd	(15−)		
^{129}Cd	48	81	128.9322356(57)	1986	147(3) ms	β^{−} (?%)	^{129}In	11/2−		
^{129}Cd	48	81	128.9322356(57)	1986	147(3) ms	β^{−}, n (?%)	^{128}In	11/2−		
^{129m1}Cd	343(8) keV			2013	157(8) ms	β^{−} (?%)	^{129}In	3/2+		
^{129m1}Cd	343(8) keV			2013	157(8) ms	β^{−}, n (?%)	^{128}In	3/2+		
^{129m2}Cd	2283(8) keV			2014	3.6(2) ms	IT	^{129}Cd	(21/2+)		
^{130}Cd	48	82	129.934388(24)	1986	126.8(18) ms	β^{−} (96.5%)	^{130}In	0+		
^{130}Cd	48	82	129.934388(24)	1986	126.8(18) ms	β^{−}, n (3.5%)	^{129}In	0+		
^{130m}Cd	2129.6(10) keV			2007	240(16) ns	IT	^{130}Cd	(8+)		
^{131}Cd	48	83	130.940728(21)	2000	98(2) ms	β^{−} (96.5%)	^{131}In	7/2−#		
^{131}Cd	48	83	130.940728(21)	2000	98(2) ms	β^{−}, n (3.5%)	^{130}In	7/2−#		
^{132}Cd	48	84	131.945823(64)	2000	84(5) ms	β^{−}, n (60%)	^{131}In	0+		
^{132}Cd	48	84	131.945823(64)	2000	84(5) ms	β^{−} (40%)	^{132}In	0+		
^{133}Cd	48	85	132.95261(22)#	2010	61(6) ms	β^{−} (?%)	^{133}In	7/2−#		
^{133}Cd	48	85	132.95261(22)#	2010	61(6) ms	β^{−}, n (?%)	^{132}In	7/2−#		
^{134}Cd	48	86	133.95764(32)#	2015	65(15) ms	β^{−}	^{134}In	0+		
This table header & footer:

== See also ==
Daughter products other than cadmium

- Isotopes of tin
- Isotopes of indium
- Isotopes of silver
- Isotopes of palladium
- Isotopes of rhodium
