= Isotopes of silver =

Isotopes of silver (_{47}Ag)
Main isotopes			Decay	
Isotope	abundance	half-life (t_{1/2})	mode	product
^{105}Ag	synth	41.29 d	ε	^{105}Pd
^{106m}Ag	synth	8.28 d	ε	^{106}Pd
^{107}Ag	51.8%	stable		
^{108m}Ag	synth	439 y	ε	^{108}Pd
^{108m}Ag	synth	439 y	IT	^{108}Ag
^{109}Ag	48.2%	stable		
^{110m2}Ag	synth	249.86 d	β^{−}	^{110}Cd
^{111}Ag	synth	7.43 d	β^{−}	^{111}Cd

Standard atomic weight A_{r}°(Ag)
- 107.8682±0.0002; 107.87±0.01 (abridged)

Naturally occurring silver (_{47}Ag) is composed of the two stable isotopes ^{107}Ag and ^{109}Ag in almost equal proportions, with ^{107}Ag being slightly more abundant (51.839% natural abundance). Notably, silver is the only element with multiple NMR-active isotopes all having spin 1/2. Thus both ^{107}Ag and ^{109}Ag nuclei produce narrow lines in nuclear magnetic resonance spectra.

40 radioisotopes have been characterized with the most stable being ^{105}Ag with a half-life of 41.29 days, ^{111}Ag with a half-life of 7.43 days, and ^{112}Ag with a half-life of 3.13 hours.

All of the remaining radioactive isotopes have half-lives that are less than an hour, and the majority of these have half-lives that are less than 3 minutes. This element has numerous meta states, with the most stable being ^{108m}Ag (half-life 439 years), ^{110m}Ag (half-life 249.86 days) and ^{106m}Ag (half-life 8.28 days).

Known isotopes of silver range in atomic weight from ^{92}Ag to ^{132}Ag. The primary decay mode before the most abundant stable isotope, ^{107}Ag, is electron capture and the primary mode after is beta decay. The primary decay products before ^{107}Ag are palladium (element 46) isotopes and the primary products after are cadmium (element 48) isotopes.

The palladium isotope ^{107}Pd decays by beta emission to ^{107}Ag with a half-life of 6.5 million years. Iron meteorites are the only objects with a high enough palladium/silver ratio to yield measurable variations in ^{107}Ag abundance. Radiogenic ^{107}Ag was first discovered in the Santa Clara meteorite in 1978.

The discoverers suggest that the coalescence and differentiation of iron-cored small planets may have occurred 10 million years after a nucleosynthetic event. ^{107}Pd versus ^{107}Ag correlations observed in bodies, which have clearly been melted since the accretion of the Solar System, must reflect the presence of live short-lived nuclides in the early Solar System.

== List of isotopes ==
Nuclide (Note: ^{m}Ag – Excited nuclear isomer.)	Z	N	Isotopic mass (Da) (Note: ( ) – Uncertainty (1σ) is given in concise form in parentheses after the corresponding last digits.) (Note: # – Atomic mass marked #: value and uncertainty derived not from purely experimental data, but at least partly from trends from the Mass Surface (TMS).)	Discovery year	Half-life (Note: # – Values marked # are not purely derived from experimental data, but at least partly from trends of neighboring nuclides (TNN).)	Decay mode (Note: Modes of decay: EC: / Electron capture; IT: / Isomeric transition; n: / Neutron emission; p: / Proton emission)	Daughter isotope (Note: Bold italics symbol as daughter – Daughter product is nearly stable.) (Note: Bold symbol as daughter – Daughter product is stable.)	Spin and parity (Note: ( ) spin value – Indicates spin with weak assignment arguments.)	Natural abundance (mole fraction)	
Nuclide	Excitation energy			Discovery year	Half-life	Decay mode	Daughter isotope	Spin and parity	Normal proportion	Range of variation
^{92}Ag	47	45	91.95971(43)#	2016	1# ms [>400 ns]	β^{+}?	^{92}Pd			
^{92}Ag	47	45	91.95971(43)#	2016	1# ms [>400 ns]	p?	^{91}Pd			
^{93}Ag	47	46	92.95019(43)#	1995	228(16) ns	β^{+}?	^{93}Pd	9/2+#		
^{93}Ag	47	46	92.95019(43)#	1995	228(16) ns	p?	^{92}Pd	9/2+#		
^{93}Ag	47	46	92.95019(43)#	1995	228(16) ns	β^{+}, p?	^{92}Rh	9/2+#		
^{94}Ag	47	47	93.94374(43)#	1994	27(2) ms	β^{+} (>99.8%)	^{94}Pd	0+#		
^{94}Ag	47	47	93.94374(43)#	1994	27(2) ms	β^{+}, p (<0.2%)	^{93}Rh	0+#		
^{94m1}Ag	1350(400)# keV			2002	470(10) ms	β^{+} (83%)	^{94}Pd	(7+)		
^{94m1}Ag	1350(400)# keV			2002	470(10) ms	β^{+}, p (17%)	^{93}Rh	(7+)		
^{94m2}Ag	6500(550)# keV			2002	400(40) ms	β^{+} (~68.4%)	^{94}Pd	(21+)		
^{94m2}Ag	6500(550)# keV			2002	400(40) ms	β^{+}, p (~27%)	^{93}Rh	(21+)		
^{94m2}Ag	6500(550)# keV			2002	400(40) ms	p (4.1%)	^{93}Pd	(21+)		
^{94m2}Ag	6500(550)# keV			2002	400(40) ms	2p (0.5%)	^{92}Rh	(21+)		
^{95}Ag	47	48	94.93569(43)#	1994	1.78(6) s	β^{+} (97.7%)	^{95}Pd	(9/2+)		
^{95}Ag	47	48	94.93569(43)#	1994	1.78(6) s	β^{+}, p (2.3%)	^{94}Rh	(9/2+)		
^{95m1}Ag	344.2(3) keV			2003	<0.5 s	IT	^{95}Ag	(1/2−)		
^{95m2}Ag	2531.3(15) keV			2003	<16 ms	IT	^{95}Ag	(23/2+)		
^{95m3}Ag	4860.0(15) keV			2003	<40 ms	IT	^{95}Ag	(37/2+)		
^{96}Ag	47	49	95.93074(10)	1982	4.45(3) s	β^{+} (95.8%)	^{96}Pd	(8)+		
^{96}Ag	47	49	95.93074(10)	1982	4.45(3) s	β^{+}, p (4.2%)	^{95}Rh	(8)+		
^{96m1}Ag (Note: Order of ground state and isomer is uncertain.)	0(50)# keV			2003	6.9(5) s	β^{+} (85.1%)	^{96}Pd	(2+)		
^{96m1}Ag	0(50)# keV			2003	6.9(5) s	β^{+}, p (14.9%)	^{95}Rh	(2+)		
^{96m2}Ag	2461.4(3) keV			2011	103.2(45) μs	IT	^{96}Ag	(13−)		
^{96m3}Ag	2686.7(4) keV			2011	1.561(16) μs	IT	^{96}Ag	(15+)		
^{96m4}Ag	6951.8(14) keV			2011	132(17) ns	IT	^{96}Ag	(19+)		
^{97}Ag	47	50	96.923881(13)	1978	25.5(3) s	β^{+}	^{97}Pd	(9/2)+		
^{97m}Ag	620(40) keV			2020	100# ms	IT?	^{97}Ag	1/2−#		
^{98}Ag	47	51	97.92156(4)	1978	47.5(3) s	β^{+}	^{98}Pd	(6)+		
^{98}Ag	47	51	97.92156(4)	1978	47.5(3) s	β^{+}, p (.0012%)	^{97}Rh	(6)+		
^{98m}Ag	107.28(10) keV			2017	161(7) ns	IT	^{98}Ag	(4+)		
^{99}Ag	47	52	98.917646(7)	1967	2.07(5) min	β^{+}	^{99}Pd	(9/2)+		
^{99m}Ag	506.2(4) keV			1978	10.5(5) s	IT	^{99}Ag	(1/2−)		
^{100}Ag	47	53	99.916115(5)	1970	2.01(9) min	β^{+}	^{100}Pd	(5)+		
^{100m}Ag	15.52(16) keV			1980	2.24(13) min	IT?	^{100}Ag	(2)+		
^{100m}Ag	15.52(16) keV			1980	2.24(13) min	β^{+}?	^{100}Pd	(2)+		
^{101}Ag	47	54	100.912684(5)	1966	11.1(3) min	β^{+}	^{101}Pd	9/2+		
^{101m}Ag	274.1(3) keV			1975	3.10(10) s	IT	^{101}Ag	(1/2)−		
^{102}Ag	47	55	101.911705(9)	1960	12.9(3) min	β^{+}	^{102}Pd	5+		
^{102m}Ag	9.40(7) keV			1967	7.7(5) min	β^{+} (51%)	^{102}Pd	2+		
^{102m}Ag	9.40(7) keV			1967	7.7(5) min	IT (49%)	^{102}Ag	2+		
^{103}Ag	47	56	102.908961(4)	1954	65.7(7) min	β^{+}	^{103}Pd	7/2+		
^{103m}Ag	134.45(4) keV			1962	5.7(3) s	IT	^{103}Ag	1/2−		
^{104}Ag	47	57	103.908624(5)	1955	69.2(10) min	β^{+}	^{104}Pd	5+		
^{104m}Ag	6.90(22) keV			1959	33.5(20) min	β^{+} (>99.93%)	^{104}Pd	2+		
^{104m}Ag	6.90(22) keV			1959	33.5(20) min	IT (<0.07%)	^{104}Ag	2+		
^{105}Ag	47	58	104.906526(5)	1939	41.29(7) d	β^{+}	^{105}Pd	1/2−		
^{105m}Ag	25.468(16) keV			1969	7.23(16) min	IT (99.66%)	^{105}Ag	7/2+		
^{105m}Ag	25.468(16) keV			1969	7.23(16) min	β^{+} (.34%)	^{105}Pd	7/2+		
^{106}Ag	47	59	105.906663(3)	1937	23.96(4) min	β^{+}	^{106}Pd	1+		
^{106}Ag	47	59	105.906663(3)	1937	23.96(4) min	β^{−}?	^{106}Cd	1+		
^{106m}Ag	89.66(7) keV			1938	8.28(2) d	β^{+}	^{106}Pd	6+		
^{106m}Ag	89.66(7) keV			1938	8.28(2) d	IT?	^{106}Ag	6+		
^{107}Ag (Note: Used to date certain events in the early history of the Solar System)	47	60	106.9050915(26)	1923	Stable			1/2−	0.51839(8)	
^{107m}Ag	93.125(19) keV			1946	44.3(2) s	IT	^{107}Ag	7/2+		
^{108}Ag	47	61	107.9059502(26)	1937	2.382(11) min	β^{−} (97.15%)	^{108}Cd	1+		
^{108}Ag	47	61	107.9059502(26)	1937	2.382(11) min	EC (2.57%)	^{108}Pd	1+		
^{108}Ag	47	61	107.9059502(26)	1937	2.382(11) min	β^{+} (0.283%)	^{108}Pd	1+		
^{108m}Ag	109.466(7) keV			1960	439(9) y	EC (91.3%)	^{108}Pd	6+		
^{108m}Ag	109.466(7) keV			1960	439(9) y	IT (8.7%)	^{108}Ag	6+		
^{109}Ag (Note: Fission product)	47	62	108.9047558(14)	1923	Stable			1/2−	0.48161(8)	
^{109m}Ag	88.0337(10) keV			1946	39.79(21) s	IT	^{109}Ag	7/2+		
^{110}Ag	47	63	109.9061107(14)	1937	24.56(11) s	β^{−} (99.70%)	^{110}Cd	1+		
^{110}Ag	47	63	109.9061107(14)	1937	24.56(11) s	EC (0.30%)	^{110}Pd	1+		
^{110m1}Ag	1.112(16) keV			1975	660(40) ns	IT	^{110}Ag	2−		
^{110m2}Ag	117.59(5) keV			1950	249.863(24) d	β^{−} (98.67%)	^{110}Cd	6+		
^{110m2}Ag	117.59(5) keV			1950	249.863(24) d	IT (1.33%)	^{110}Ag	6+		
^{111}Ag	47	64	110.9052968(16)	1937	7.433(10) d	β^{−}	^{111}Cd	1/2−		
^{111m}Ag	59.82(4) keV			1957	64.8(8) s	IT (99.3%)	^{111}Ag	7/2+		
^{111m}Ag	59.82(4) keV			1957	64.8(8) s	β^{−} (0.7%)	^{111}Cd	7/2+		
^{112}Ag	47	65	111.9070485(26)	1938	3.130(8) h	β^{−}	^{112}Cd	2(−)		
^{113}Ag	47	66	112.906573(18)	1949	5.37(5) h	β^{−}	^{113m}Cd	1/2−		
^{113m}Ag	43.50(10) keV			1958	68.7(16) s	IT (64%)	^{113}Ag	7/2+		
^{113m}Ag	43.50(10) keV			1958	68.7(16) s	β^{−} (36%)	^{113}Cd	7/2+		
^{114}Ag	47	67	113.908823(5)	1958	4.6(1) s	β^{−}	^{114}Cd	1+		
^{114m}Ag	198.9(10) keV			(1990) (Note: Only published in a conference proceeding and not a refereed journal.)	1.50(5) ms	IT	^{114}Ag	(6+)		
^{115}Ag	47	68	114.908767(20)	1949	20.0(5) min	β^{−}	^{115m}Cd	1/2−		
^{115m}Ag	41.16(10) keV			1958	18.0(7) s	β^{−} (79.0%)	^{115}Cd	7/2+		
^{115m}Ag	41.16(10) keV			1958	18.0(7) s	IT (21.0%)	^{115}Ag	7/2+		
^{116}Ag	47	69	115.911387(4)	1958	3.83(8) min	β^{−}	^{116}Cd	(0−)		
^{116m1}Ag	47.90(10) keV			2005	20(1) s	β^{−} (93%)	^{116}Cd	(3+)		
^{116m1}Ag	47.90(10) keV			2005	20(1) s	IT (7%)	^{116}Ag	(3+)		
^{116m2}Ag	129.80(22) keV			1971	9.3(3) s	β^{−} (92%)	^{116}Cd	(6−)		
^{116m2}Ag	129.80(22) keV			1971	9.3(3) s	IT (8%)	^{116}Ag	(6−)		
^{117}Ag	47	70	116.911774(15)	1958	73.6(14) s	β^{−}	^{117m}Cd	1/2−#		
^{117m}Ag	28.6(2) keV			1990	5.34(5) s	β^{−} (94.0%)	^{117m}Cd	7/2+#		
^{117m}Ag	28.6(2) keV			1990	5.34(5) s	IT (6.0%)	^{117}Ag	7/2+#		
^{118}Ag	47	71	117.9145955(27)	1968	3.76(15) s	β^{−}	^{118}Cd	(2−)		
^{118m1}Ag	45.79(9) keV			1989	~0.1 μs (Note: Half-life only estimated)	IT	^{118}Ag	(1,2)−		
^{118m2}Ag	123.5(12) keV			2025	1.92(7) s	β^{−}	^{118}Cd	(7-)		
^{118m3}Ag	127.63(10) keV			1971	2.0(2) s	β^{−} (59%)	^{118}Cd	(5+)		
^{118m3}Ag	127.63(10) keV			1971	2.0(2) s	IT (41%)	^{118}Ag	(5+)		
^{118m4}Ag	279.37(20) keV			1993	~0.1 μs	IT	^{118}Ag	(3+)		
^{119}Ag	47	72	118.915570(16)	1975	2.1(1) s	β^{−}	^{119}Cd	(7/2+)		
^{119m}Ag	33.5(3) keV			1991	6.0(5) s	β^{−}	^{119}Cd	(1/2−)		
^{120}Ag	47	73	119.918785(5)	1971	1.52(7) s	β^{−}	^{120}Cd	4(+)		
^{120}Ag	47	73	119.918785(5)	1971	1.52(7) s	β^{−}, n (<.003%)	^{119}Cd	4(+)		
^{120m1}Ag	0(50)# keV			2012	940(100) ms	β^{−}?	^{120}Cd	(0−, 1−)		
^{120m1}Ag	0(50)# keV			2012	940(100) ms	IT?	^{120}Ag	(0−, 1−)		
^{120m1}Ag	0(50)# keV			2012	940(100) ms	β^{−}, n?	^{119}Cd	(0−, 1−)		
^{120m2}Ag	203.2(2) keV			1971	384(22) ms	IT (68%)	^{120}Ag	7(−)		
^{120m2}Ag	203.2(2) keV			1971	384(22) ms	β^{−} (32%)	^{120}Cd	7(−)		
^{120m2}Ag	203.2(2) keV			1971	384(22) ms	β^{−}, n?	^{119}Cd	7(−)		
^{121}Ag	47	74	120.920125(13)	1982	777(10) ms	β^{−} (99.92%)	^{121}Cd	7/2+#		
^{121}Ag	47	74	120.920125(13)	1982	777(10) ms	β^{−}, n (0.080%)	^{120}Cd	7/2+#		
^{122}Ag	47	75	121.9235420(56)	1978	550(50) ms	β^{−}	^{122}Cd	(1−)		
^{122}Ag	47	75	121.9235420(56)	1978	550(50) ms	β^{−}, n?	^{121}Cd	(1−)		
^{122m1}Ag	303.7(50) keV			2000	200(50) ms	β^{−}	^{122}Cd	(9−)		
^{122m1}Ag	303.7(50) keV			2000	200(50) ms	β^{−}, n?	^{121}Cd	(9−)		
^{122m1}Ag	303.7(50) keV			2000	200(50) ms	IT?	^{122}Ag	(9−)		
^{122m2}Ag	171(50)# keV			2013	6.3(1) μs	IT	^{122}Ag	(1+)		
^{123}Ag	47	76	122.92532(4)	1976	294(5) ms	β^{−} (99.44%)	^{123}Cd	(7/2+)		
^{123}Ag	47	76	122.92532(4)	1976	294(5) ms	β^{−}, n (0.56%)	^{122}Cd	(7/2+)		
^{123m1}Ag	59.5(5) keV			2019	100# ms	β^{−}	^{123}Cd	(1/2−)		
^{123m1}Ag	59.5(5) keV			2019	100# ms	β^{−}, n?	^{122}Cd	(1/2−)		
^{123m2}Ag	1450(14)# keV			2013	202(20) ns	IT	^{123}Ag			
^{123m3}Ag	1472.8(8) keV			2009	393(16) ns	IT	^{123}Ag	(17/2−)		
^{124}Ag	47	77	123.9289318(74)	1984	177.9(26) ms	β^{−} (98.7%)	^{124}Cd	(2−)		
^{124}Ag	47	77	123.9289318(74)	1984	177.9(26) ms	β^{−}, n (1.3%)	^{123}Cd	(2−)		
^{124m1}Ag	188.2(25) keV			2014	144(20) ms	β^{−}	^{124}Cd	(8−)		
^{124m1}Ag	188.2(25) keV			2014	144(20) ms	β^{−}, n?	^{123}Cd	(8−)		
^{124m2}Ag	155.6(5) keV			2013	140(50) ns	IT	^{124}Ag	(1+)		
^{124m3}Ag	231.1(7) keV			2012	1.48(15) μs	IT	^{124}Ag	(1−)		
^{125}Ag	47	78	124.9310029(43)	1994	160(5) ms	β^{−} (88.2%)	^{125}Cd	(9/2+)		
^{125}Ag	47	78	124.9310029(43)	1994	160(5) ms	β^{−}, n (11.8%)	^{124}Cd	(9/2+)		
^{125m1}Ag	97.1(5) keV			2019	50# ms	β^{−}?	^{125}Cd	(1/2−)		
^{125m1}Ag	97.1(5) keV			2019	50# ms	IT?	^{125}Ag	(1/2−)		
^{125m1}Ag	97.1(5) keV			2019	50# ms	β^{−}, n?	^{124}Cd	(1/2−)		
^{125m2}Ag	1501.2(6) keV			2009	491(20) ns	IT	^{125}Ag	(17/2−)		
^{126}Ag	47	79	125.93481(22)#	1994	52(10) ms	β^{−} (86.3%)	^{126}Cd	3+#		
^{126}Ag	47	79	125.93481(22)#	1994	52(10) ms	β^{−}, n (13.7%)	^{125}Cd	3+#		
^{126m1}Ag	100(100)# keV			1995	108.4(24) ms	β^{−}	^{126}Cd	9−#		
^{126m1}Ag	100(100)# keV			1995	108.4(24) ms	IT?	^{126}Ag	9−#		
^{126m1}Ag	100(100)# keV			1995	108.4(24) ms	β^{−}, n?	^{125}Cd	9−#		
^{126m2}Ag	254.8(5) keV			2012	27(6) μs	IT	^{126}Ag	1−#		
^{127}Ag	47	80	126.93704(22)#	1995	89(2) ms	β^{−} (85.4%)	^{127}Cd	(9/2+)		
^{127}Ag	47	80	126.93704(22)#	1995	89(2) ms	β^{−}, n (14.6%)	^{126}Cd	(9/2+)		
^{127m}Ag	1938(17) keV			2021	67.5(9) ms	β^{−} (91.2%)	^{127}Cd	(27/2+)		
^{127m}Ag	1938(17) keV			2021	67.5(9) ms	IT (8.8%)	^{127}Ag	(27/2+)		
^{128}Ag	47	81	127.94127(32)#	2000	54(4) ms	β^{−} (80%)	^{128}Cd	(9−)		
^{128}Ag	47	81	127.94127(32)#	2000	54(4) ms	β^{−}, n (20%)	^{127}Cd	(9−)		
^{128}Ag	47	81	127.94127(32)#	2000	54(4) ms	β^{−}, 2n?	^{126}Cd	(9−)		
^{128m}Ag	2053.9+Z keV			2025	1.60(7) μs	IT	^{128}Ag	(16−)		
^{129}Ag	47	82	128.94432(43)#	2000	49.9(35) ms	β^{−} (>80%)	^{129}Cd	9/2+#		
^{129}Ag	47	82	128.94432(43)#	2000	49.9(35) ms	β^{−}, n (<20%)	^{128}Cd	9/2+#		
^{130}Ag	47	83	129.95073(46)#	2000	40.6(45) ms	β^{−}	^{130}Cd	1−#		
^{130}Ag	47	83	129.95073(46)#	2000	40.6(45) ms	β^{−}, n?	^{129}Cd	1−#		
^{130}Ag	47	83	129.95073(46)#	2000	40.6(45) ms	β^{−}, 2n?	^{128}Cd	1−#		
^{131}Ag	47	84	130.95625(54)#	2013	35(8) ms	β^{−} (90%)	^{131}Cd	9/2+#		
^{131}Ag	47	84	130.95625(54)#	2013	35(8) ms	β^{−}, 2n (10%)	^{129}Cd	9/2+#		
^{131}Ag	47	84	130.95625(54)#	2013	35(8) ms	β^{−}, n?	^{130}Cd	9/2+#		
^{132}Ag	47	85	131.96307(54)#	2015	30(14) ms	β^{−}	^{132}Cd	6−#		
^{132}Ag	47	85	131.96307(54)#	2015	30(14) ms	β^{−}, n?	^{131}Cd	6−#		
^{132}Ag	47	85	131.96307(54)#	2015	30(14) ms	β^{−}, 2n?	^{130}Cd	6−#		
This table header & footer:

== See also ==
Daughter products other than silver

- Isotopes of cadmium
- Isotopes of palladium
- Isotopes of rhodium
