= Cegelec =

French engineering company

Actemium
- Industry: Electrical engineering
- Predecessor: Compagnie Générale d'Entreprises Électriques (CGEE)
- Founded: 1989
- Headquarters: Saint-Denis, Seine-Saint-Denis, France
- Area served: Worldwide
- Revenue: €2.8 billion (2010)
- Number of employees: 22,000 (2010)
- Parent: Škoda Transportation
- Website: www.cegelec.fr

Cegelec or Actemium is a French engineering company specialized in electrical infrastructure, HVAC, information technology, nuclear energy development, transport infrastructure, robotics and offering both public and private services. Cegelec was officially formed in 1989, and as of 2014 the company employs around 22,000 people and operates in 30 countries, with major activity in France, Brazil, Indonesia, the Middle East and Africa. It was acquired by Vinci on 14 April 2010, assimilating the collection of Cegelec's sub-companies, which each specialize in a specific field or geographical region, into Vinci's corporate system. In 2024 it was purchased by Škoda Transportation

== History ==
In 1913 the company Compagnie Générale d'Entreprises Électriques (CGEE) was established by the Compagnie Générale d'Electricité (CGE).

In 1971 it was renamed CGEE-Alstom. In 1989 CGE and General Electric Company formed the joint operation GEC-Alstom, and CGEE-Alstom was renamed Cegelec. In 1999 Cegelec became Alstom Entreprise and Alstom Contracting.

On 20 July 2001 Alstom Contracting was subject to a Leveraged Management Buyout supported by Caisse des dépôts et consignations and Charterhouse Capital Partners, and was renamed Cegelec.

The company was acquired by private equity fund LBO France in 2006. In 2008 Qatari Diar became the majority shareholder. In September 2009, Cegelec was purchased by Vinci. In 2014, Cegelec adopted the Actemium brand name. In 2024 the business was acquired by Škoda Transportation.

== Organisation ==
After Vinci's acquisition of the company from Qatari Diar in 2010, Cegelec's organisation and operation under the Cegelec company title did not change; Vinci's energy and engineering divisions have assisted Cegelec endeavors but have not actively changed the organisational structure of Cegelec.

Cegelec is split into 15 separate sub-companies, which are all owned by the overarching Cegelec company known as Cegelec Enterprise. After the acquisition, the administration and direction of each company were controlled by Vinci Energies, yet each sub-company maintained their original specializations. The following are all the Cegelec sub-companies listed on Cegelec.com as of 17/April/2020:

- Cegelec CEM
  - Specializing in nuclear energy engineering, Cegelec CEM has 240 employees and offers services across the nuclear cycle to nuclear plants throughout France. Some notable customers are Électricité de France (EDF), the French Alternative Energies and Atomic Energy Commission (CEA), the National Agency for Radioactive Waste Management (ANDRA), Areva, and the International Thermonuclear Experimental Reactor (ITER). Cegelec CEM is further subdivided into three business units, each responsible for different stages of the nuclear cycle.
    - CEM Ingénierie:
      - Specialized in preliminary designs and assisting in the creation of new nuclear plants, Ingénierie ensures all designs and plans satisfy nuclear safety protocols, are secure, are sustainable and are feasible to construct. Such practices were useful in developing modern-day nuclear reactor safety protocols, as seen in their contribution to the 1993 IEEE Conference Record Nuclear Science Symposium.
    - CEM Projets:
      - Primarily focused on research projects and waste management, this business unit is usually contracted for innovative nuclear projects, such as that of ITER and their experimental reactor. They provide services in reactor pool liners, robotics, high specification tasks and high integrity handling systems.
    - CEM Énergie:
      - This business unit is mostly concerned with post-construction maintenance and refurbishment. They are regularly tasked with renewing EDF’s nuclear power plants, upgrading plants across France to updated nuclear regulations, and currently partaking in NDT (Non-Destructive Testing) and associated services for EDF’s Hinkley Point C nuclear plant in Somerset, England.
- Cegelec Projets Espace
  - This sub-company is specialized in space projects and works closely with French national agencies such as CNES, by whom they have been contracted "to develop the cryogenic interfaces between the launcher and ground systems" on the Ariane 6 rocket in French Guiana. Like with this project, this branch of Cegelec operates on a contract basis, assisting larger corporations in engineering, maintaining fire solutions for launch and designing personal protective equipment.
- Cegelec Défense
  - Cegelec Défense is a sub-company offering personalized security and information security to customers, frequently updating the content of their services via exchanges with the French Armed Forces and networks from both within Vinci Group and without. Recently, Cegelec Défense has been contracted by the French government to maintain a fleet of adaptable Chalands Multi-Missions (CMM), useful tasks such as underwater repair missions, training duties and pollution management. This subsidiary is further subdivided into four business units, each further specializing in security: Cegelec Défense Solutions & Services, Cegelec Défense Infrastructure & Networks, Cegelec Défense Marine and Cegelec Défense Protection & Security.
    - Cegelec Défense Solutions & Services
      - Primarily responsible for designing and completing one time installments, this business unit offers services to military and civilian companies alike. Such services include mobile command centres, expeditionary logistics, climate simulators, medical equipment and custom services.
    - Cegelec Défense Infrastructure & Networks
      - Specializing in large infrastructure development and prolonged construction tasks, this unit takes on more permanent tasks. Such tasks include developing hardened bunkers, communication networks, site security reinforcement and long-term maintenance on any infrastructure based security measures.
    - Cegelec Défense Marine
      - Specializing in military naval ships, the Marine business unit maintains and refits existing vessels with up-to-date technology and software. While focussing on maintenance and refitting, this unit is can be involved at any point in a vessel's lifetime from construction to decommission. They offer services primarily in France, but also conduct business in an international setting.
    - Cegelec Défense Protection & Security
      - Generally involved with civilian security related contracts, this unit offers surveys of premises and provides solutions to potential perimeter breaches and logistics. They offer surveillance, perimeter security, access control and upgrades to existing facilities.
- Cegelec Centre-Est Tertiaire
- Cegelec Mobility
  - Mobility started as one of the central elements of Cegelec prior to the acquisition by Vinci, specializing in transportation engineering and currently operating under its own brand name of Mobility, while technically classified as Cegelec sub-company. They design, construct, and manage infrastructure of roads, tunnels and railways, both existing and developing. Their work generally involves electrical aspects of transport, such as renewal of railway electrification lines or developing intelligent traffic management systems. Mobility works internationally, having completed projects in France, Luxembourg, Morocco, Algeria and other countries. One of their recent contracts include the electrification of the new tram line between Rabat and Salé, Morocco in 2008.
- Cegelec Netherlands
- Cegelec Nord Grands Projets
- Cegelec Perpigna
- Cegelec Polynésie
- Cegelec Quimper Infras
- Cegelec Ancenis Infras
- Cegelec Belgium
- Cegelec Shelters Transport Métallerie (STM)
- Cegelec Tertiaire IDF
- Cegelec Valenciennes Tertiaire

== Geographic Areas of Influence ==
=== France ===
From the 2010 Cegelec Financial Report, 58.1% of Cegelec's total sales were made within France, the country which contains the highest diversity of Cegelec's operations, hosting their nuclear, marine, defense and the largest amount of electrical engineering/transport sub-companies. Cegelec's international headquarters are in Saint-Denis, acting as the central hub for Cegelec's international interactions. One of their recent contracts in France was the assignment "to design remote handling equipment for France’s proposed underground [nuclear] repository" in 2014. This contract was estimated to be valued at €20 million and took approximately four years to complete.

=== Rest of Europe ===
Excluding France, the rest of Europe constituted 26% of annual sales in 2010, with countries closer to France yielding higher revenue. Operations in each nation vary from team to team, with countries like the Netherlands and the Czech Republic having their websites in the local language and conducting business independently of the broader Cegelec brand name.

List of countries in which Cegelec has been involved in Europe (excluding France) since 2010:

- Austria
- Belgium
- Czech Republic
- Germany
- Italy
- Luxembourg
- Netherlands
- Portugal
- Poland
- Spain
- Switzerland

=== Africa ===
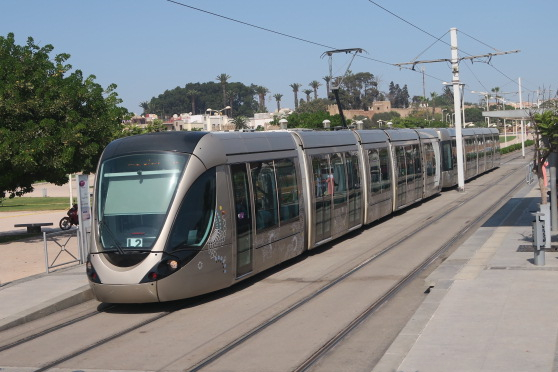
Electric tram line in Rabat, Morocco. Manufactured by Alstom/Cegelec

Cegelec's operations in Africa are focused on developing/managing electrical and transport infrastructure, with countries involved generally putting forth specific contracts in their individual requests. Some of such contracts include management of the electrification of the 18 km long tram line in Rabat, Morocco, in 2008, which officials commissioned to connect the inner and outer bounds of the capital city. In 2010, Cameroon's Société Nationale de Raffinage contracted Cegelec to refit and redevelop Cameroon's national oil refinery. With the refinery's last upgrade in the late 1970s, Cegelec was offered €25 million to implement modern pneumatic technology and completely redesign the safety features and protocols of the refinery. This contract lasted 18 months and resulted in the refinery raising its efficiency and meeting modern safety standards.

List of countries in which Cegelec has been involved in Africa:

- Algeria
- Angola
- Cameroon
- Democratic Republic of Congo
- Gabon
- Morocco
- Nigeria

=== Middle East ===
Beginning in the early 2000s, the Middle East's oil and gas supply entered the world economy, increasing regional GDP by 32% for local involved countries, who then employed offshore companies to assist the management of the new supply. Cegelec became involved on account of their engineering and safety system services, with one such assignment from the Abu Dhabi Gas Industries Limited contracting them to "design, supply and install new integrated control systems (ICS) for the gas liquefaction plants of Bab and Adab". The contract was priced at $72 million USD for a time frame of 28 months, and was completed in mid-2007.

List of countries in which Cegelec has been involved in the Middle East:

- Bahrain
- United Arab Emirates
- Oman
- Qatar

=== Other Areas of Operation ===
List of countries in which Cegelec has been involved in the rest of the world:

- China
- Brazil
- Indonesia
- Singapore

== Scientific Achievements ==
As an engineering company, Cegelec has contributed to the global community in the fields of nuclear engineering, electrification logistics, robotics, infrastructure, information systems and safety systems. Developments in which they have participated include a programmable safety protection system (SPS – AC 132–16), which was one of the centrepieces of nuclear reactor safety protocols and controllers in 1999. The code base and core components of this system have been integrated into modern nuclear plants, which Cegelec has been contracted to develop, maintain and innovate for clients. They own various patents on energy technology (primarily transistor and energy-loss prevention techniques) that have since been incorporated into current energy sources. Two such patents that pertain to renewable energy include design components for a wave energy converter and a variable speed converter for wind turbines, put forth at the 1997 IEE Colloquium, and implemented in later projects. Cegelec designed and implemented a common DC bus fed inverter for the wave energy power generator known as the OSPREY (Ocean Swell Powered Renewable EnergY) project, a new generation of international, modular wave energy generators; Cegelec's role in this project was regulating the electrical output of each generator and maximizing conversion efficiency. For wind turbines, Cegelec developed a product called Alspa GD4000, a "bi-directional 45 kW power electronic variable speed driver and controller," used for integrating generators and flywheel systems within wind turbines. Both patents and consequent projects center around electrical energy conversion and provided a foundation for future advances in both wave and wind energy technology, fields which are generally not as profitable for Cegelec as nuclear, coal, and electrical infrastructure work.

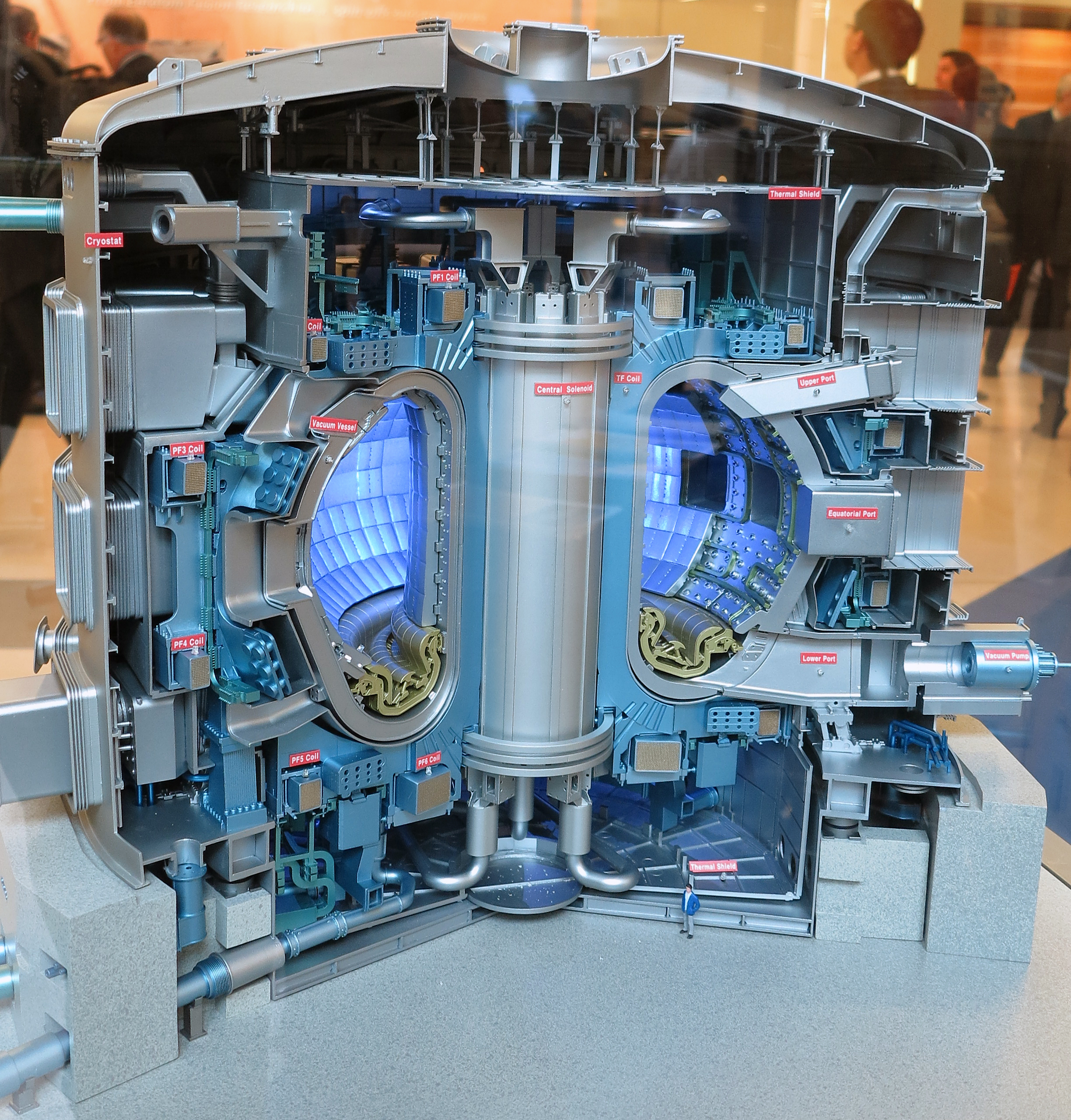
Cross sectional model of an ITER experimental fusion reactor

International, large-scale scientific projects that Cegelec has been invited to work in include the two below:

The first is their participation in the ITER fusion program starting in 2016, known as Fusion for Energy (F4E), in which they have been employed to design, produce, operate and maintain remote handling equipment to function within the fusion reactor. According to World Nuclear News, Fusion for Energy is the "world's largest experimental nuclear fusion facility," and is doing work in the field of fusion energy; Cegelec's involvement in the first Cask and Plus Remote Handling System (CPRHS) of this size is one of Cegelec's most recognized nuclear projects.

In 2017, they were contracted to by the Centre National d’Études Spatiales (CNES) to remodel and create cryogenic interfaces operating between Ariane 6 rocket launch systems and the ground systems in French Guiana. The CNES aimed to horizontally integrate the entire launcher system for the first time in the Ariane space programs history, tasking Latecoere Services (the lead contractor), Air Liquide and Cegelec to allow fuelling arms to operate efficiently within this system.
