= PROTO (fusion reactor) =

PROTO is a proposed nuclear fusion reactor to be implemented after 2050, a successor to the ITER and DEMO projects. It is part of the European Commission long-term strategy for research of fusion energy. PROTO would act as a prototype power station, taking in any technology refinements from earlier projects, and demonstrating electricity generation on a commercial basis. It may or may not be a second part of DEMO/PROTO experiment.
