= Pietro Barabaschi =

Italian fusion engineer and ITER director-general

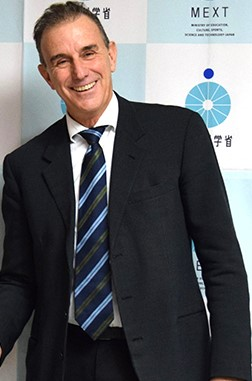
- Barabaschi in 2024
- Known for: Director-General of ITER
- Scientific career
- Fields: Fusion power
- Institutions: ITER, Fusion for Energy

Pietro Barabaschi is an Italian engineer and fusion-energy executive who has served as the Director-General of ITER since 2022. He leads the multinational ITER fusion experiment under construction in southern France.

== Career ==
Before becoming director-general of ITER, Barabaschi worked in the European and international fusion research sector. He held senior roles at Fusion for Energy (F4E), the European domestic agency responsible for managing Europe's contribution to ITER and related fusion projects. He has also been associated with the Joint European Torus and earlier phases of the ITER programme.

In September 2022, the ITER Council appointed Barabaschi as the next director-general of the ITER Organization, succeeding Bernard Bigot, who had died earlier that year.

== Director-General of ITER ==
Barabaschi took over ITER during a period of technical and scheduling challenges for the project. In early 2023 he acknowledged that ITER could face years of additional delays and that the previous timetable had not been realistic.

In 2023, Bloomberg reported that Barabaschi was attempting to reorganize the 34-nation project after setbacks linked to global supply disruptions and earlier engineering issues.

Industry publications later reported improved progress at the project. In 2025, Nuclear Engineering International wrote that ITER was "back on track" following a period of restructuring and recovery under Barabaschi's leadership.

Barabaschi has also served as a public spokesman for the international fusion project and its multinational governance structure. A 2024 feature in Monocle described him as managing expectations around fusion energy while maintaining political support for the long-running collaboration.

A 2025 Reuters report on ITER's magnet system quoted Barabaschi as saying that the project's earlier "crisis" had passed and that construction was proceeding at the fastest pace in ITER's history.

== Public profile ==
Barabaschi has appeared in international media coverage of the global effort to develop fusion energy. He was featured in a National Geographic report examining the scientific and political challenges of fusion power.

In addition to his management role at ITER, Barabaschi has written about scientific culture and the importance of documenting failure in research.

== See also ==
- ITER
- Fusion power
- Fusion for Energy
