= Kaname Ikeda =

Japanese civil servant (born 1946)

Kaname Ikeda (池田 要, Ikeda Kaname, born January 1, 1946) is a Japanese civil servant.

Ikeda graduated from the University of Tokyo in 1968, and joined the Atomic Energy Bureau of the Japanese Science and Technology Agency (STA). In 1984 he became Director of the Nuclear Fuels Division of the STA. In 1985 he was appointed Counselor to the Scientific Section of the Japanese Embassy in Washington D.C.

From 1988 to 2003 he served in various roles at STA and the Japanese Ministry of International Trade and Industry (MITI), including Director-General of the Nuclear Safety Bureau (1996-1998), Director-General of the R&D Development Bureau (1998-2000). In 2000 he was appointed Deputy Minister for Science and Technology at STA, and in 2001, became the Executive Director of Japan's National Space Development Agency.

In 2003 he was appointed Ambassador to Croatia. He was named as the first director-general (DG) of the International Thermonuclear Experimental Reactor (ITER) in December 2005.
