= Lithium orthosilicate =

Chemical compound

Identifiers
| CAS Number | 13453-84-4 |
| 3D model (JSmol) | Interactive image |
| ChemSpider | 8096016 |
| ECHA InfoCard | 100.033.290 |
| EC Number | 264-592-4 |
| PubChem CID | 9920381 |
| CompTox Dashboard (EPA) | DTXSID401014490 |
- InChI: InChI=1S/4Li.O4Si/c;;;;1-5(2,3)4/q4*+1;-4 Key: YTZVWGRNMGHDJE-UHFFFAOYSA-N
- SMILES: [Li+].[Li+].[Li+].[Li+].[O-][Si]([O-])([O-])[O-]

Properties
| Chemical formula | Li_{4}O_{4}Si |
| Molar mass | 119.84 g·mol^{−1} |
- Except where otherwise noted, data are given for materials in their standard state (at 25 °C [77 °F], 100 kPa). Infobox references

Lithium orthosilicate is a compound with the chemical formula Li_{4}SiO_{4}. It is a white ceramic compound, which melts congruently at a temperature of 1,258 °C (2,296 °F).

Lithium orthosilicate is of primary interest towards carbon dioxide capture, as this compound reacts with CO_{2} at elevated temperatures to form lithium carbonate, and has been implemented in limited scale in such applications. Further applications of Li_{4}SiO_{4} include solid electrolytes for lithium-ion batteries, specifically solid state batteries, and tritium breeding materials, as a component of the breeding blanket for planned fusion energy systems such as ITER.

== See also ==
- Lithium metasilicate — other lithium silicate compound
- Carbon dioxide scrubber
