= Fusion for Energy =

European atomic energy undertaking

European Joint Undertaking for ITER and the Development of Fusion Energy
- Fusion for Energy (F4E)

Joint undertaking overview
- Formed: March 27, 2007
- Jurisdiction: European Atomic Energy Community (European Union)
- Headquarters: c/ Josep Pla, nº 2 Torres Diagonal Litoral Edificio B3 08019 Barcelona Spain; 41.408310°N 2.218846°E
- Joint undertaking executive: Marc Lachaise, Director
- Key document: Council Decision No. 2007/198/Euratom
- Website: fusionforenergy.europa.eu

Fusion for Energy (F4E) is a joint undertaking of the European Atomic Energy Community (Euratom) that is responsible for the EU's contribution to the International Thermonuclear Experimental Reactor (ITER), the world's largest scientific partnership aiming to demonstrate fusion as a viable and sustainable source of energy. The organisation is officially named European Joint Undertaking for ITER and the Development of Fusion Energy and was created under article 45 of the Treaty establishing the European Atomic Energy Community by the decision of the Council of the European Union on 27 March 2007 for a period of 35 years.

F4E counts 450 members of staff. Its seat is located in Barcelona, Spain, and it has offices in Saint-Paul-lès-Durance, France, and Garching, Germany. One of its main tasks is to work together with European industry and research organisations to develop and provide a wide range of high technology components for the ITER project.

== Mission and governance ==
The European Union is the host party for the ITER project. Its contribution amounts to 45%, while the other six parties have an in-kind contribution of approximately 9% each. Since 2008, F4E has been collaborating with at least 440 companies and more than 65 R&D organisations.

F4E's primary mission is to manage the European contribution to the ITER project; therefore it provides financial funds, which mostly come from the European Community budget. Among other tasks, F4E oversees the preparation of the ITER construction site in Saint-Paul-lès-Durance, in France. F4E is formed by Euratom (represented by the European Commission), the Member States of the European Union and Switzerland, which participates as a third country. To ensure the overall supervision of its activities, the members sit on a governing board, which has a wide range of responsibilities including appointing the director.

=== Difficulties ===
A report by the consultancy Ernst & Young published in 2013 by the European Parliament's Budgetary Control Committee found that F4E had suffered from significant management difficulties. According to the report, "the organisation faced a series of internal problems that have only been gradually addressed, notably an organisational structure ill-adapted for project-oriented activities." From 2010, a host of reforms were undertaken within F4E, including a reshuffling and reorientation of the governance and management structures, as well as a cost-savings programme.

== Projects ==
Fusion is the process which powers the sun, producing energy by fusing together light atoms such as hydrogen at extremely high pressures and temperatures. Fusion reactors use two forms of hydrogen, deuterium and tritium, as fuel.

The benefits of fusion energy are that it is an inherently safe process and it does not create greenhouse gases or long-lasting radioactive waste.

=== ITER ===
ITER, meaning "the way" in Latin, is an international experiment aiming to demonstrate the scientific and technical feasibility of fusion as an energy source. The machine is being constructed in Saint-Paul-lès-Durance in the South of France and is funded by seven parties: China, the European Union, India, Japan, Russia, South Korea and the United States. Collectively, the parties taking part in the ITER project represent over one half of the world's population and 80% of the global GDP.

=== The DEMO project ===
F4E also aims to contribute to DEMO (Demonstration Power Plant). This experiment is supposed to generate significant amounts of electricity over extended periods and will be self-sufficient in tritium, one of the necessary gases to create fusion. The first commercial fusion electricity power plants are set to be established following DEMO, which is set to be larger in size than ITER and to produce significantly larger fusion power over long periods: a continuous production of up to 500 megawatts of electricity.

== Broader Approach activities ==
The Broader Approach (BA) activities are three research projects carried out under an agreement between the European Atomic Energy Community (Euratom) and Japan, which contribute equally financially. They are meant to complement the ITER project and accelerate the development of fusion energy through R&D by cooperating on a number of projects of mutual interest.

This agreement entered into force on 1 June 2007 and runs for at least 10 years. The Broader Approach consists of three main projects located in Japan: the Satellite Tokamak Programme project JT-60SA (super advanced), the International Fusion Materials Irradiation Facility / Engineering Validation and Engineering Design Activities (IFMIF/EVEDA) and the International Fusion Energy Research Centre (IFERC).

== See also ==
- ITER
- Fusenet
- Fusion power
- European Atomic Energy Community
- List of plasma physics software
