= Breeding blanket =

Component of nuclear fission or fusion reactors

A breeding blanket is a device used in nuclear engineering to transmute quantities of an element, using the neutron flux from a fission reactor or fusion reactor. In the fission context, breeding blankets have been used since the 1950s in breeder reactors, to manufacture fission fuel from fertile material. In the fusion context, they have been conceptualized for the manufacture of tritium from lithium-6. In both scenarios, neutron radiation is converted into thermal energy in the blanket, leading it to require its own cooling system.

== Fission blanket ==
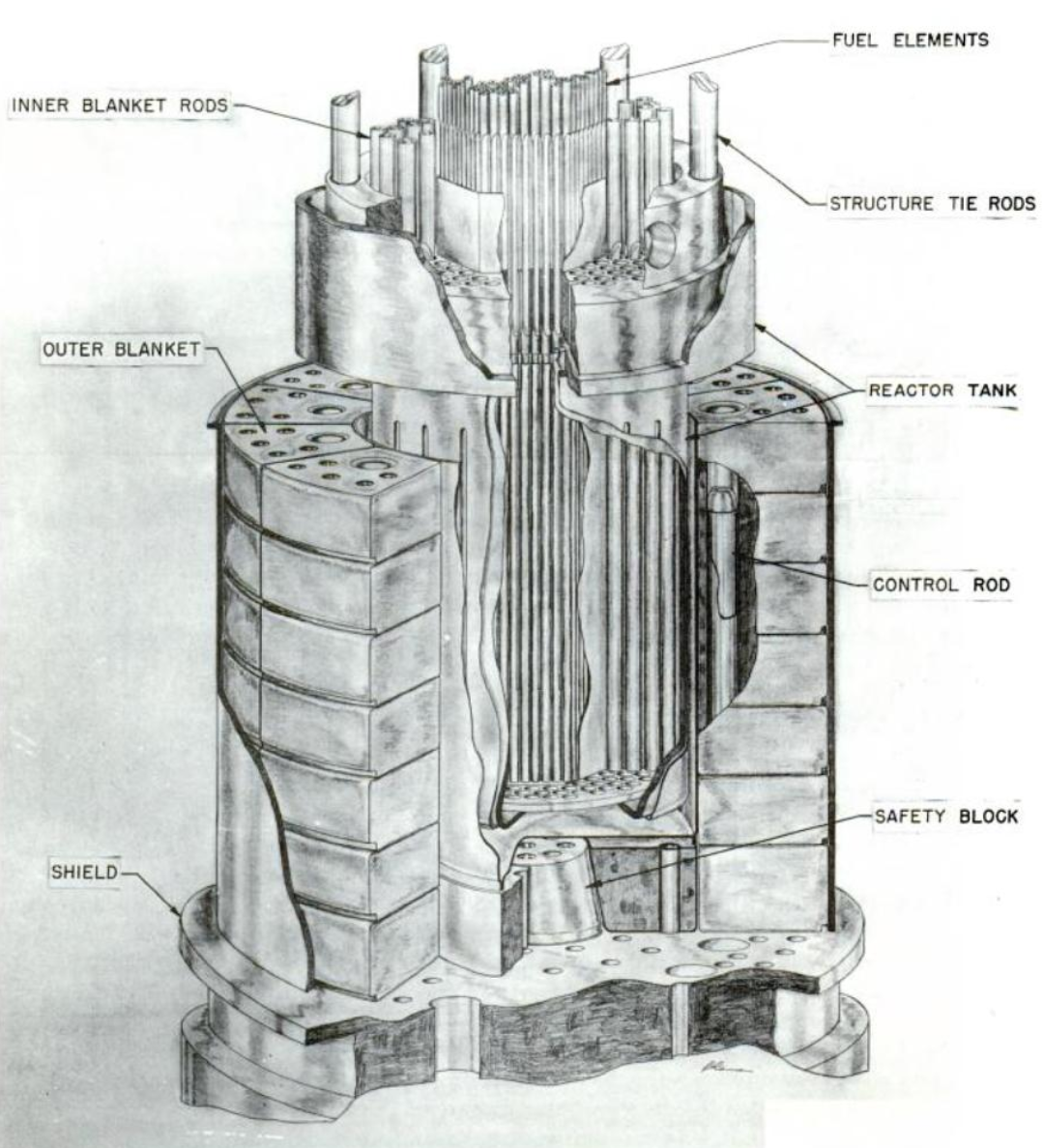
Diagram of the two blankets within the Experimental Breeder Reactor I

Breeder reactors come in two types: thermal and fast. The former use thermal neutrons to activate thorium-232, ultimately producing uranium-233:

$\ce{{^{232}_{90}Th} + ^{1}_{0}n -> [\text{(n,}\gamma\text{)}] {^{233}_{90}Th}->[\beta^-][\text{21.8 min}] {^{233}_{91}Pa} ->[\beta^-][\text{27 days}] {^{233}_{92}U}}$

The latter use fast neutrons to activate uranium-238, ultimately producing plutonium-239:

$\ce{^{238}_{92}U + {}^{1}_{0}n -> {}^{239}_{92}U ->[\beta^-][23.5\ \ce{min}] {}^{239}_{93}Np ->[\beta^-][2.356\ \ce{d}] {}^{239}_{94}Pu}$

Historically the production of both was more common in rod assemblies, such as in the Hanford Site and Mayak nuclear weapons production facilities. However, blankets are used to minimize the neutron and energy loss rate. Examples include the Experimental Breeder Reactor I and Shippingport Atomic Power Station initial core in the 1950s.

== Fusion blanket ==
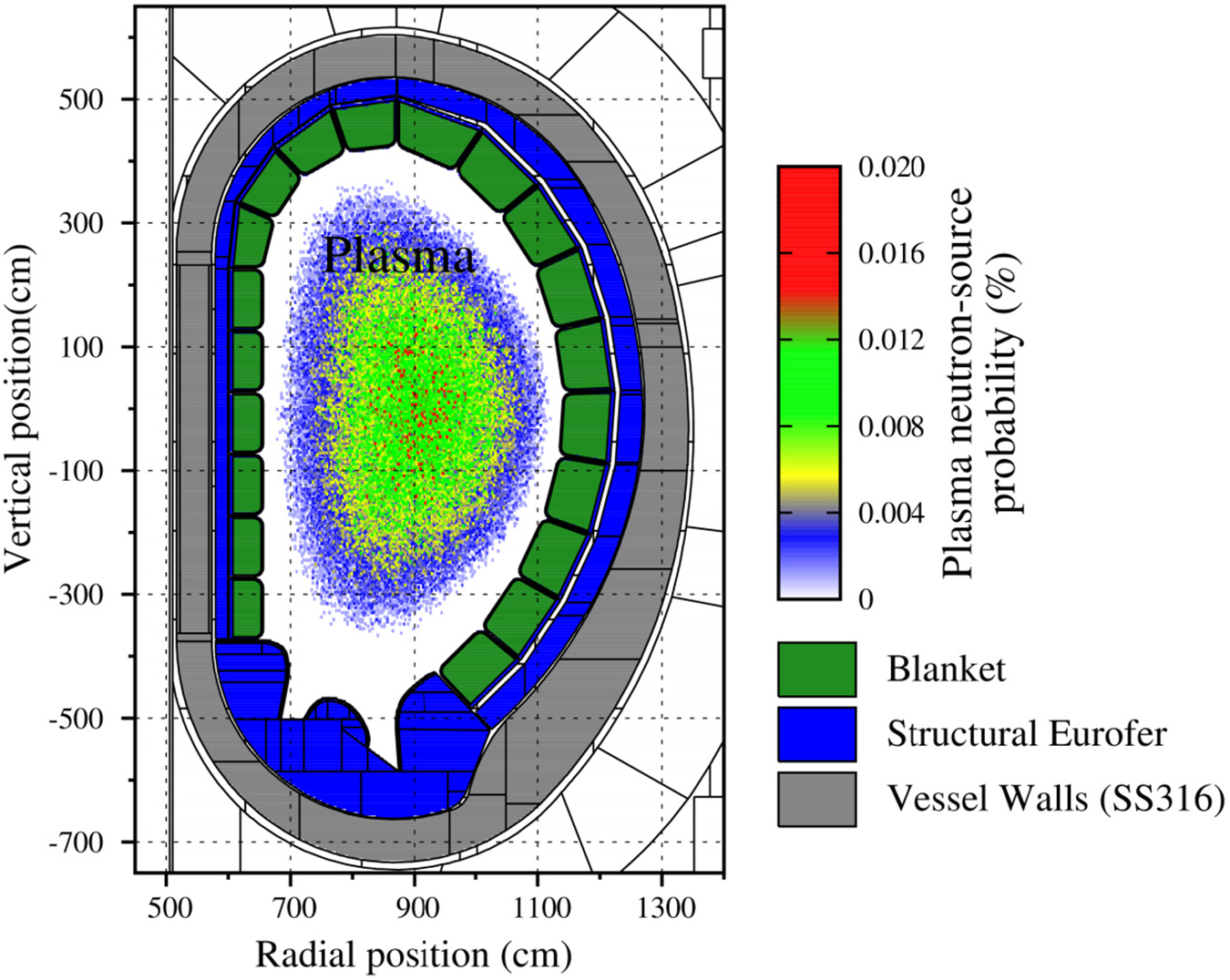
Model simulation showing the breeding blanket in the conceptual DEMOnstration Power Plant

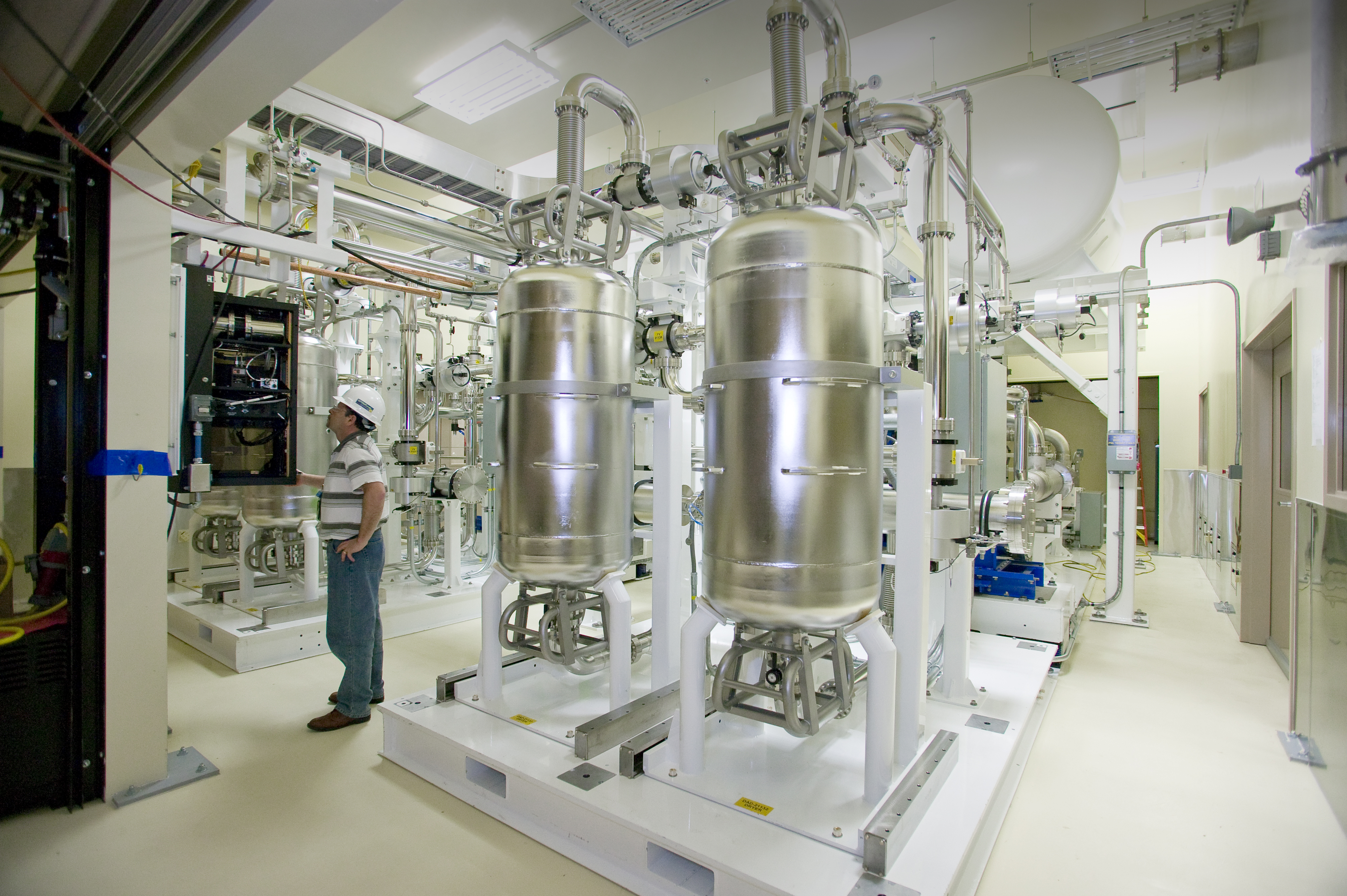
Tritium processing at the National Ignition Facility. A fusion blanket would require a much larger system to continually process the lithium-bearing material.

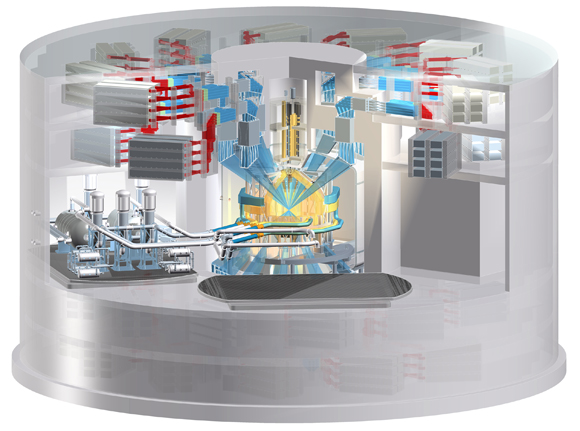
LIFE inertial confinement fusion power plant concept. The breeding blanket is visible in the center.

In conceptual fusion power plants, including both magnetic and inertial confinement schemes, a breeding blanket can serve multiple purposes:

- Absorbing fusion neutrons to breed tritium from lithium
- Multiplying the neutron flux
- Absorbing fusion neutrons to produce thermal energy from the reactor
- Cooling the interior reactor components such as the first wall
- Shielding the exterior reactor components from neutron radiation and limited X-ray radiation

It is only the breeding portion that cannot be replaced by other means. For instance, a large quantity of water makes an excellent cooling system and neutron shield, as in the case of a conventional nuclear reactor. However, tritium is not a naturally occurring resource, and thus is difficult to obtain in sufficient quantity to run a reactor through other means, so if commercial fusion using the D-T cycle is to be achieved, successful breeding of the tritium in commercial quantities is a requirement.

=== Tritium breeding ===
The primary purpose is to breed further tritium fuel for the nuclear fusion reaction through the reaction of neutrons with lithium in the blanket:

$^{6}_{3}\text{Li} + {}^{1}_{0}\text{n} \longrightarrow {}^{3}_{1}\text{H} + ^{4}_{2}\text{He}+ \text{4.8 MeV}$

$^{7}_{3}\text{Li} + {}^{1}_{0}\text{n} \longrightarrow {}^{3}_{1}\text{H} + ^{4}_{2}\text{He}+ {}^{1}_{0}\text{n'}-\text{2.5 MeV}$

For the 14 MeV neutrons from fusion reactions, the latter reaction has a cross section ~10 times smaller. Thus most blankets propose the use of highly-enriched (>90%) lithium-6, derived from the 2% to 8% which exists in natural lithium. The most common method for lithium enrichment is the chemical COLEX process.

==== Liquid blanket ====
A liquid blanket proposes a molten material containing lithium. One suggestion is a lithium-lead mixture, as lead experiences neutron-doubling spallation in the presence of 14 MeV fusion neutrons:

$\ce{^{208}_{82}{Pb}+ {}^{1}_{0}n -> {}^{207m}_{82}{Pb}+ 2^{1}_{0}n}$

Another is the molten salt FLiBe, where beryllium undergoes the spallation:

$^{9}_{4}\text{Be} + ^{1}_{0}\text{n} \longrightarrow ^{8}_{4}\text{Be} + 2^{1}_{0}\text{n}$

Such a blanket was suggested for the MIT ARC fusion concept. Other liquid metal and molten salt compounds have been proposed. Most are fluoride salts, for which there is the significant absorption:

$^{19}_{9}\text{F} + ^{1}_{0}\text{n} \longrightarrow ^{20}_{9}\text{F}$

The properties of various liquid lithium-bearing compounds proposed for breeding blankets are given below:

Properties of compounds proposed for liquid breeding blankets
Lithium compound	Composition (%mol)	Li content (%mol)	Density	Melting temperature (K)	~Optimum ^{6}Li enrichment	~Tritium breeding ratio	Simulated relative neutron flux (n×10^{14}/cm^{2}/s)
Li	100	100	0.472	454	30%	1.4	7.07
Pb-Li	84-16	16	11.000	508	100%	1.6	28.0
LiF-BeF_{2} (FLiBe)	67-33	28.57	1.960	732	30%	1.2	9.94
LiF-NaF-BeF_{2} (FLiNaBe)	31-31-38	14.29	2.030	588	60%	1.1	10.8
LiF-NaF-KF (FLiNaK)	46.5-11.5-42	23.25	2.020	727	60%	0.9	9.55
LiF-LiBr-NaBr	20-73-7	46.5	3.160	723	100%	1.1	9.06
LiF-LiBr-NaF	14-79-9	46.5	3.200	728	100%	1.1	9.22
LiF-LiI	83.5-16.5	50	3.680	684	100%	1.1	8.54
LiF-NaF-ZrF_{4}	55-22-23	20.36	2.720	863	80%	1.1	11.0

==== Pebble-bed blanket ====
Some breeding blanket designs are based on lithium containing ceramics, with a focus on lithium titanate and lithium orthosilicate. These materials, mostly in a pebble form, are used to produce and extract tritium and helium; must withstand high mechanical and thermal loads; and should not become excessively radioactive upon completion of their useful service life.

=== Coolant system ===
The blanket may also act as a cooling mechanism, absorbing the energy from the neutrons produced by the reaction between deuterium and tritium ("D-T"), and further serves as shielding, preventing the high-energy neutrons from escaping to the area outside the reactor and protecting the more radiation-susceptible portions, such as ohmic or superconducting magnets, from damage.

ITER runs a major effort in blanket design and will test a number of potential solutions. The four main concepts are the

- Dual-cooled lithium lead (DCLL)
- Helium-cooled lithium lead (HCLL)
- Helium-cooled pebble bed (HCPB)
- Water-cooled lithium lead (WCLL)

Light water, helium, and lead coolant systems, and understanding of their neutronic behaviors, have already been developed for various fission reactors. Six different tritium breeding systems, known as Test Blanket Modules (TBM) will be tested in ITER.

To date no large-scale breeding system has been attempted, and it is an open question whether such a system is possible to create.
