= Bernard Bigot =

French physicist (1950–2022)

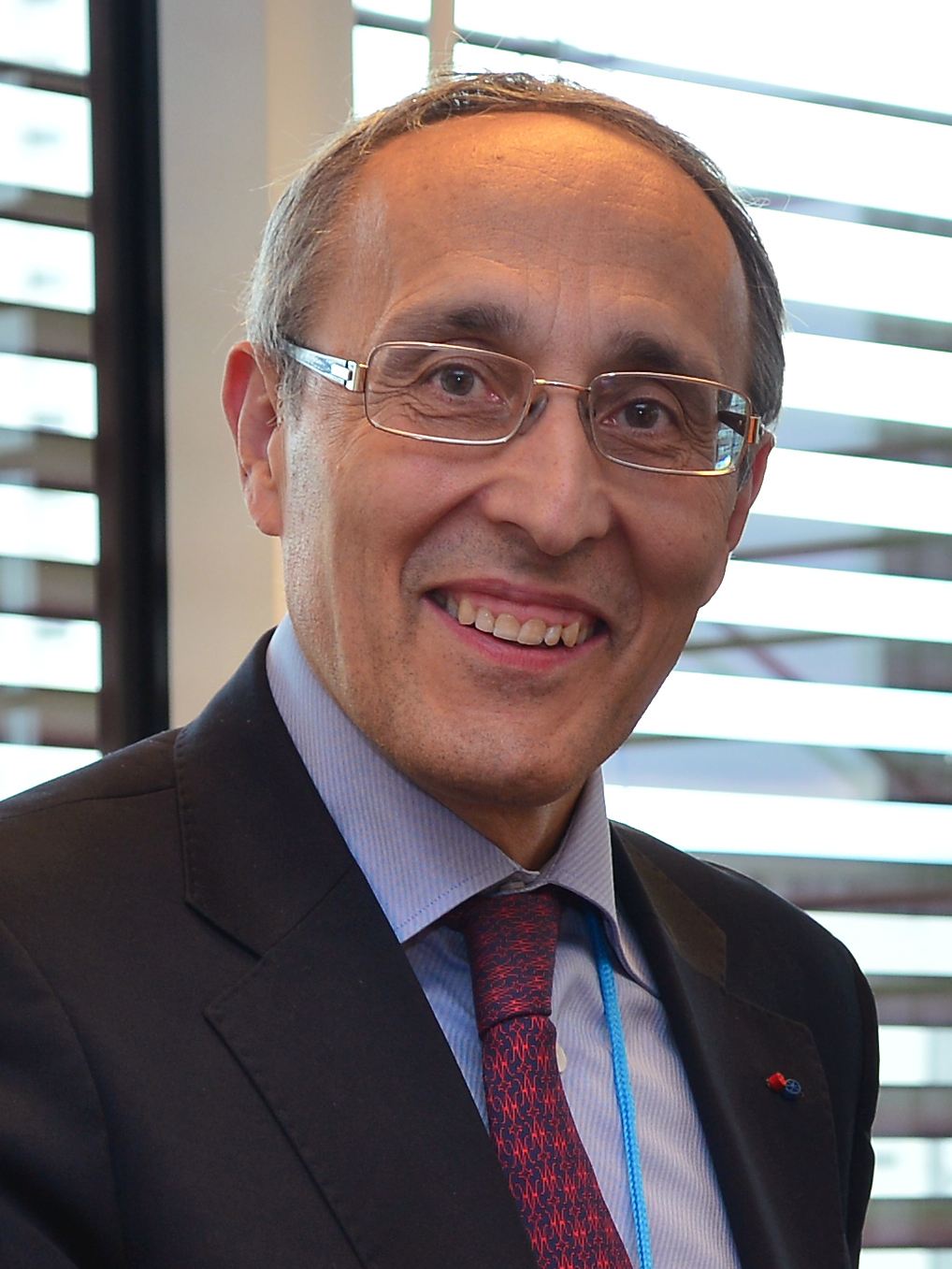
- Bigot in 2013
- Born: 24 January 1950; Blois, France
- Died: 14 May 2022 (aged 72); France
- Education: École normale supérieure de lettres et sciences humaines Pierre and Marie Curie University
- Spouse: Chantal Bigot-Martin (née Martin)
- Scientific career
- Fields: Nuclear physics
- Workplaces: École normale supérieure de Lyon; Commissariat à l'énergie atomique et aux énergies alternatives ITER
- Thesis: Étude théorique de la réactivité des états excités des molécules organiques par la méthode des corrélations naturelles (1979)
- Doctoral advisor: Lionel Salem

Bernard Bigot (French: [bɛʁnar biɡo]; 24 January 1950 – 14 May 2022) was a French academic and civil servant. He served as the Director-General of the ITER organization between 2015 and 2022. He was the president of the École normale supérieure de Lyon and director of the French Commission for Atomic Energy.

== Education ==
Bernard Bigot studied at the École normale supérieure de lettres et sciences humaines, the Orsay faculty of sciences, which is now part of Paris-Saclay University and the Pierre and Marie Curie University. He earned an advanced degree in physical sciences with a major in chemistry and a doctorate in physics and chemistry. Bigot completed his doctoral thesis in 1979 at Orsay with Lionel Salem as his supervisor, titled Étude théorique de la réactivité des états excités des molécules organiques par la méthode des corrélations naturelles.

== Career ==
When the École normale supérieure de Lyon was founded in 1985, Bernard Bigot was appointed deputy director of studies.

In July 2003, he was appointed High Commissioner for Atomic Energy, a post he held until May 2009. In January 2009, he was appointed Director General of the French Atomic Energy Commission, replacing Alain Bugat.

In 2011, he was reappointed as Director General of the CEA for a three-year term from 9 January 2012. In November 2014, he was appointed to succeed Osamu Motojima as Director General of the ITER international research project. He was elected Director-General on 5 March 2015, and unanimously re-elected by the ITER Council in January 2019 for a further five years, but fell ill and died on 14 May 2022. His successor, Pietro Barabaschi, was appointed by the ITER Council on 15 September 2022.

== Personal life ==
Bigot married Chantal Martin in 1975.

Bigot died on 14 May 2022, at the age of 72.

== Honors and awards ==
- Commandeur of the Order of Legion of Honour
- Officier of the Ordre National du Mérite
- Knight of the Ordre des Palmes Académiques
- Order of the Rising Sun
- Commandeur of the Order of the Polar Star
