= International Fusion Materials Irradiation Facility =

Materials testing facility

A schematic representation of the target area of the International Fusion Material Irradiation Facility (IFMIF). A small target area is irradiated by a pair of deuteron beams to study the effects of intense neutron flux (produced by the interaction of deuterons with a stream of lithium) on materials.

The International Fusion Materials Irradiation Facility, also known as IFMIF, is a projected material testing facility in which candidate materials for the use in an energy producing fusion reactor can be fully qualified. IFMIF will be an accelerator-driven neutron source producing a high intensity fast neutron flux with a spectrum similar to that expected at the first wall of a fusion reactor using a deuterium-lithium nuclear reaction. The IFMIF project was started in 1994 as an international scientific research program, carried out by Japan, the European Union, the United States, and Russia, and managed by the International Energy Agency. Since 2007, it has been pursued by Japan and the European Union under the Broader Approach Agreement in the field of fusion energy research, through the IFMIF/EVEDA project, which conducts engineering validation and engineering design activities for IFMIF. The construction of IFMIF is recommended in the European Roadmap for Research Infrastructures Report, which was published by the European Strategy Forum on Research Infrastructures (ESFRI).

== Background ==
The deuterium-tritium fusion reaction generates mono-energetic neutrons with an energy of 14.1 MeV. In fusion power plants, neutrons will be present at fluxes in the order of 10^{18} m^{−2}s^{−1} and will interact with the material structures of the reactor by which their spectrum will be broadened and softened. A fusion relevant neutron source is an indispensable step towards the successful development of fusion energy. Safe design, construction and licensing of a fusion power facility by the corresponding Nuclear Regulatory agency will require data on the plasma-facing materials degradation under neutron irradiation during the life-time of a fusion reactor. The main source of materials degradation is structural damage which is typically quantified in terms of displacements per atom (dpa). Whereas in the currently constructed large fusion experiment, ITER, structural damage in the reactor steels will not exceed 2 dpa at the end of its operational life, damage creation in a fusion power plant is expected to amount to 15 dpa per year of operation.

None of the commonly available neutron sources are adequate for fusion materials testing for various reasons. The accumulation of gas in the material microstructure is intimately related to the energy of the colliding neutrons. Due to the sensitivity of materials to the specificities in the irradiation conditions, such as the α-particle generation/dpa ratio at damage levels above 15 dpa per year of operation under temperature controlled conditions, material tests require the neutron source to be comparable to a fusion reactor environment.

In steels, the ^{54}Fe(n,α)^{51}Cr and ^{54}Fe(n,p)^{54}Mn reactions are responsible for most of the protons and α-particles produced, and these have an incident neutron energy threshold at 0.9 MeV and 2.9 MeV respectively. Therefore, conventional fast fission reactors, which produce neutrons with an average energy around 1-2 MeV, cannot adequately match the testing requirements for fusion materials. In fact the leading factor for embrittlement, the generation of α-particles by transmutation, is far from realistic conditions (actually around 0.3 appm He/dpa). Spallation neutron sources provide a wide spectrum of energies up to the order of hundreds of MeV leading to potentially different defect structures, and generating light transmuted nuclei that intrinsically affect the targeted properties of the alloy. Ion implantation facilities offer insufficient irradiation volume (maximum values of a few hundreds µm layer thickness) for standardized mechanical property tests. Also the low elastic scattering cross section for light ions makes damage levels above 10 dpa impractical.

In 1947, Robert Serber demonstrated theoretically the possibility of producing high energy neutrons by a process in which high energy deuterons are stripped of their proton when hitting a target, while the neutron continues on its way. In the 1970s, the first designs for high energy neutron sources using this stripping reaction were developed in the USA. In the 1980s, the rapid advances in high-current linear accelerator technology led to the design of several accelerator-driven neutron sources for satisfying the requirements of a high-flux high-volume international fusion materials testing facility. The Fusion Materials Irradiation Test (FMIT) facility based on a deuterium-lithium neutron source was proposed for fusion materials and technology testing.

The deuterium-lithium reaction exploited for IFMIF is able to provide an adequate fusion neutron spectrum as shown by the comparison of IFMIF with other available neutron sources. In an experiment with 40 MeV deuterons from a cyclotron impinging on lithium, the neutron spectrum and the radioactivity production in the lithium were measured, and sufficient agreement with calculated estimates was found.

== Description ==
IFMIF will consist of five major systems: an accelerator facility, a Li target facility, a test facility, a post-irradiation examination (PIE) facility and a conventional facility. The whole plant must comply with international nuclear facility regulations. The energy of the beam (40 MeV) and the current of the parallel accelerators (2 x 125 mA) have been tuned to maximize the neutron flux (10^{18} m^{−2} s^{−1}) while creating irradiation conditions comparable to those in the first wall of a fusion reactor. Damage rates higher than 20 dpa per year of operation could be reached in a volume of 0.5 L of its High Flux Test Module that can accommodate around 1000 small test specimens. The small specimen testing techniques developed aim at full mechanical characterization (fatigue, fracture toughness, crack growth rate, creep and tensile stress) of candidate materials, and allow, besides a scientific understanding of fusion neutron induced degradation phenomena, the creation of the major elements of a fusion materials database suited for designing, licensing and reliably operating future fusion reactors. The main expected contributions of IFMIF to the nuclear fusion community are to:

1. provide data for the engineering design for DEMO,
2. provide information to define performance limits of materials,
3. contribute to the completion and validation of existing databases,
4. contribute to the selection or optimization of different alternative fusion materials,
5. validate the fundamental understanding of the radiation response of materials including benchmarking of irradiation effects modelling at length-scales and time-scales relevant for engineering application,
6. tests blanket concept and functional materials prior to or complementary to ITER test blanket module testing.

== IFMIF Intermediate Engineering Design ==
The engineering design of the IFMIF plant is intimately linked with the validation activities and was conducted during the first phase of the so-called IFMIF Engineering Validation and Engineering Design Activities project (IFMIF/EVEDA). The IFMIF Intermediate Engineering Design Report was established in June 2013 and adopted by the stakeholders in December 2013. The IFMIF Intermediate Engineering Design defines the major systems in outline.

=== Accelerator facility (LiPac) ===
The two accelerator CW deuteron beams of 5 MW each impinge in an overlapping manner at an angle of ±9° with a footprint of 200 mm x 50 mm and a steady time profile on the liquid Li jet, with the Bragg peak absorption region at about 20 mm depth.

=== Target facility ===
The target facility, which holds the inventory of about 10 m^{3} of Li, forms and conditions the beam target. The Li screen fulfills two main functions: to react with the deuterons to generate a stable neutron flux in the forward direction and to dissipate the beam power in a continuous manner. The flowing Li (15 m/s; 250 °C) is shaped and accelerated in the proximity of the beam interaction region by a two-stage reducer nozzle forming a concave jet of 25 mm thickness with a minimum radius of curvature of 250 mm in the beam footprint area. The resulting centrifugal pressure raises the boiling point of the flowing Li and thus ensures a stable liquid phase. The beam power absorbed by the Li is evacuated by the heat removal system and the lithium is cooled to 250 °C by a serial of heat exchangers. The control of impurities, essential for the quality of the liquid screen, will be done through a tailored design of cold and hot trap systems, and purities of Li during operation better than 99.9% are expected. On-line monitoring of impurities will detect impurity levels over 50 ppm. Based on numerical analyses carried out in the last three decades, the beam-target interaction is not expected to have a critical impact on jet stability.

=== Test facility ===
The Test Facility will provide high, medium and low flux regions ranging from ›20 dpa/full power year (fpy) to ‹1 dpa /fpy with increasingly available irradiating volumes of 0.5 L, 6 L and 8 L that will house different metallic and non-metallic materials potentially subjected to the different irradiation levels in a power plant. More specifically, in the high flux region, fluences of 50 dpa in ‹3.5 years in a region of 0.5 L, together with power plant relevant fluences of ›120 dpa in ‹5 years in a region of 0.2 L, are planned. The high flux region will accommodate about 1000 small specimens assembled in 12 individual capsules independently temperature controlled that will allow not only mechanical characterization of the candidate structural materials tested, but also an understanding of the influence in their degradation with material temperature during irradiation.

=== Post-irradiation facility ===
The Post-Irradiation Examination facility, an essential part of IFMIF, is hosted in a wing of the main building in order to minimize the handling operations of irradiated specimens. It will not only allow testing irradiated specimens out of the different testing modules, but also characterizing metallographically the specimens after destructive testing.

== IFMIF Engineering Validation Activities ==
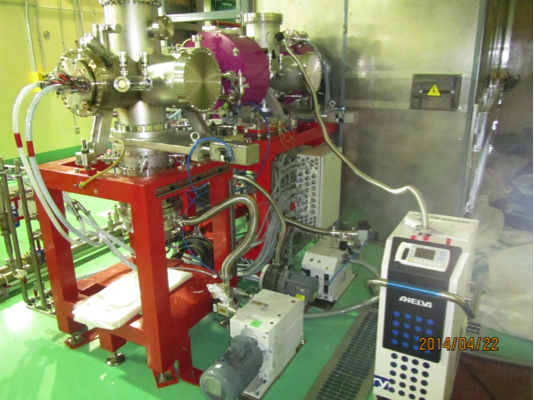
Fig. 7. LEBT image of the deuteron injector of the Linear IFMIF Accelerator Prototype Accelerator (LIPAc) under installation in Rokkasho, Japan.

To minimise the risks in constructing IFMIF, the IFMIF/EVEDA project has constructed or is constructing prototypes of those systems which face the main technological challenges that have been identified throughout the years of international cooperation in establishing a fusion relevant neutron source, namely 1) the Accelerator Facility, 2) the Target Facility, and 3) the Test Facility. An Accelerator Prototype (LIPAc), designed and constructed mainly in European laboratories CEA, CIEMAT, INFN and SCK•CEN under the coordination of F4E and under installation at Rokkasho at JAEA premises, is identical to the IFMIF accelerator design up to its first superconductive accelerating stage (9 MeV energy, 125 mA of D+ in Continuous Wave (CW) current), and will become operational in June 2017. A Li Test Loop (ELTL) at the Oarai premises of JAEA, integrating all elements of the IFMIF Li target facility, was commissioned in February 2011, and is complemented by corrosion experiments performed at a Li loop (Lifus6) in ENEA, Brasimone. A High Flux Test Module (two different designs accommodating either Reduced Activation Ferritic-Martensitic steels (RAFM) or SiC), with a prototype of the capsules housing the small specimens were irradiated in the BR2 research reactor of SCK•CEN and tested in the cooling helium loop HELOKA of the Karlsruhe Institute of Technology, Karlsruhe, together with a Creep Fatigue Test Module manufactured and tested at full scale at the Paul Scherrer Institute. Detailed specific information on the ongoing validation activities is being made available in related publications.

== See also ==
- ITER (International Thermonuclear Experimental Reactor, and Latin for "the way")
