= DEMOnstration Power Plant =

Planned fusion facility

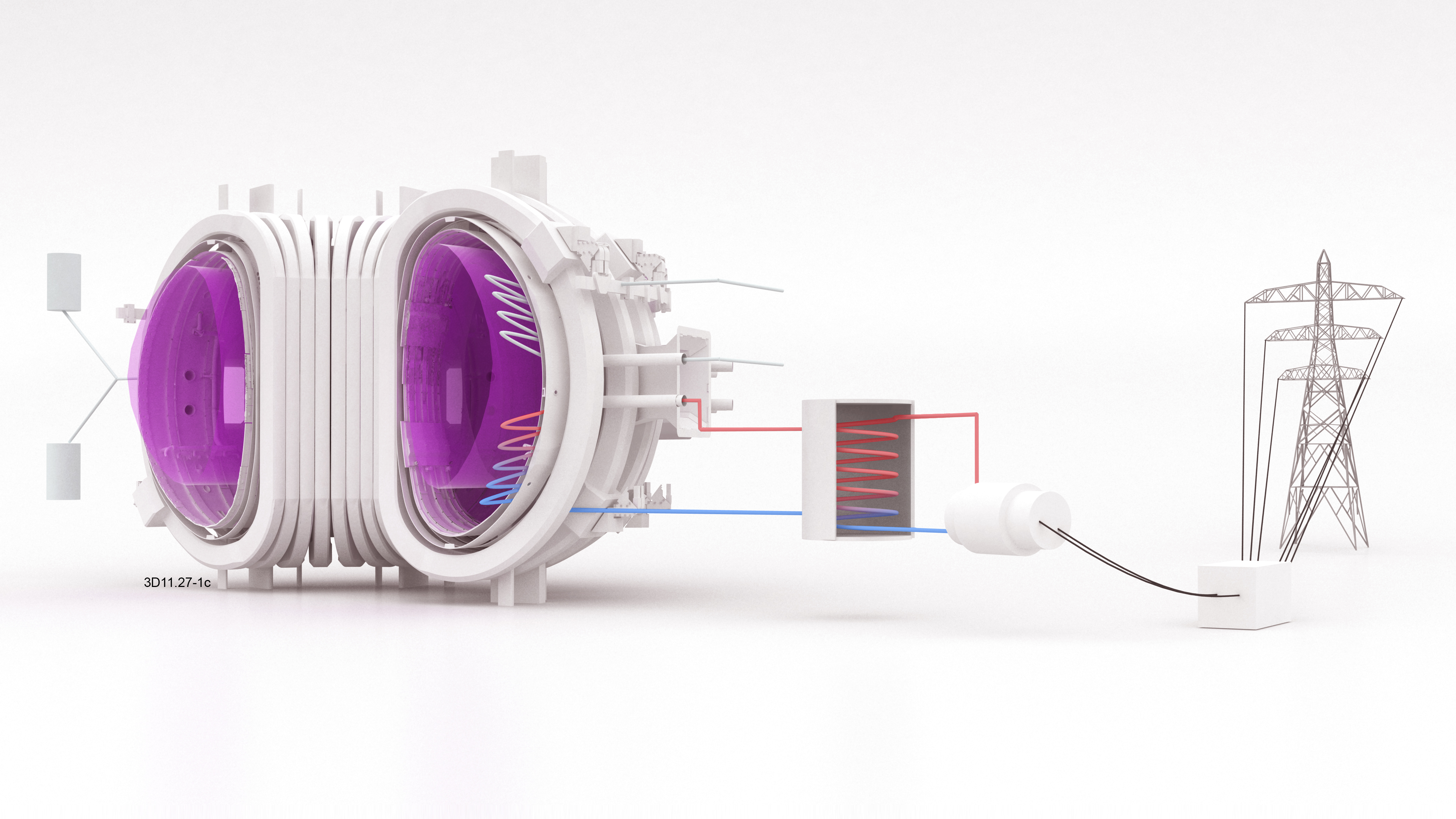
Artist's concept of DEMO connected to the power grid

DEMO, or a demonstration power plant (often stylized as DEMOnstration power plant), refers to a proposed class of nuclear fusion experimental reactors that are intended to demonstrate the net production of electric power from nuclear fusion. Most of the ITER partners have plans for their own DEMO-class reactors. With the possible exception of the EU and Japan, there are no plans for international collaboration as there was with ITER.

Plans for DEMO-class reactors are intended to build upon the ITER experimental nuclear fusion reactor.

The most well-known and documented DEMO-class reactor design is that of the European Union (EU). The following parameters have been used as a baseline for design studies: the EU DEMO should produce at least 2000 megawatts (2 gigawatts) of fusion power on a continuous basis, and it should produce 25 times as much power as required for scientific breakeven, which does not include the power required to operate the reactor. The EU DEMO design of 2 to 4 gigawatts of thermal output will be on the scale of a modern electric power station. However, the nominal value of the steam turbine is 790 megawatts, which, after overcoming a 5% loss because of the coupling from the turbine to the synchronous generator, results in a nominal value for electrical power output of approximately 750 megawatts.^{:5}

Project	Injected Thermal Input	Gross Thermal Output	Q plasma value
JET	24 MW	16 MW	0.6
ITER	50 MW	500 MW	10
EU DEMO	80 MW	2000 MW	25

To achieve its goals, if utilizing a conventional tokamak design, a DEMO reactor must have linear dimensions about 15% larger than ITER, and a plasma density about 30% greater than ITER. According to timeline from EUROfusion, operation is planned to begin in 2051.

It is estimated that subsequent commercial fusion reactors could be built for about a quarter of the cost of DEMO. However, the ITER experience suggests that development of a multi-billion US dollar tokamak-based technology innovation cycle able to develop fusion power stations that can compete with non-fusion energy technologies is likely to encounter the "valley of death" problem in venture capital, i.e., insufficient investment to go beyond prototypes, as DEMO tokamaks will need to develop new supply chains and are labor intensive.

== DEMO's place in the development of fusion power ==
The 2019 US National Academies of Sciences, Engineering, and Medicine 'Final Report of the Committee on a Strategic Plan for U. S. Burning Plasma Research' noted, "a large DEMO device no longer appears to be the best long-term goal for the U.S. program. Instead, science and technology innovations and the growing interest and potential for private-sector ventures to advance fusion energy concepts and technologies suggest that smaller, more compact facilities would better attract industrial participation and shorten the time and lower the cost of the development path to commercial fusion energy". Approximately two dozen private-sector companies are now aiming to develop their own fusion reactors within the DEMO roadmap timetable. The US appears to be working towards one or more national DEMO-class fusion power plants on a cost-sharing basis.

The 3 October 2019 UK Atomic Energy announcement of its Spherical Tokamak for Energy Production (STEP) grid-connected reactor for 2040 suggests a combined DEMO/PROTO phase machine apparently to be designed to leapfrog the ITER timetable. China's proposed CFETR machine, a grid-connected gigawatt-generating reactor, overlaps the DEMO timetable. Japan also has plans for a DEMO reactor, the JA-DEMO, via its upgraded JT-60, as does South Korea (K-DEMO).

In November 2020, an independent expert panel reviewed EUROfusion's design and R&D work on the EU's DEMO, and EUROfusion confirmed it was proceeding with the next step of its Roadmap to Fusion Energy, namely the conceptual design of a DEMO in partnership with the European fusion community and industry, suggesting an EU-backed DEMO-phase machine that could formally bear the DEMO name.

In June 2021, General Fusion announced it would accept the UK government's offer to host the world's first substantial public-private partnership fusion demonstration plant, at Culham Centre for Fusion Energy. The plant will be constructed from 2022 to 2025 and is intended to lead the way for commercial pilot plants in the late 2020s. The plant will be 70% of full scale and is expected to attain a stable plasma of 150 million degrees.

== History of the concept ==
The DEMO reactor concept goes back to the 1970s. A graph by W.M. Stacey shows that by 1979, there were completed DEMO designs by General Atomics and Oak Ridge National Laboratory.

At a June 1986 meeting organized by the IAEA, participants agreed on the following, concise definition for a DEMO reactor: "The DEMO is a complete electric power station demonstrating that all technologies required for a prototype commercial reactor work reliably enough to develop sufficient confidence for such commercial reactors to be competitive with other energy sources. The DEMO does not need to be economic itself nor does it have to be full scale reactor size."

The following year, an IAEA document shows design parameters for a DEMO reactor in the US by Argonne National Laboratory, a DEMO reactor in Italy called FINTOR, (Frascati, Ispra, Napoli Tokamak Reactor), a DEMO reactor at Culham (UK), and a European DEMO reactor called NET (Next European Torus). The major parameters of NET were 628 MW net electrical power and 2200 MW gross thermal power output, nearly the same as the current EU DEMO design.

== Timeline ==
The EU DEMO timeline has slipped several times, following slippage in the ITER timetable. The following timetable was presented at the IAEA Fusion Energy Conference in 2004 by Christopher Llewellyn Smith:

- Conceptual design was to be completed in 2017
- Engineering design is to be complete by 2024 (after input from ITER D-T tests, and data from IFMIF - both delayed as of 2016)
- The first construction phase is to last from 2024 to 2033
- The first phase of operation is to last from 2033 to 2038
- The station is then to be expanded and updated (e.g. with phase 2 blanket design)
- The second phase of operation is to start in 2040

In 2012, European Fusion Development Agreement (EFDA) presented a roadmap to fusion power with a plan showing the dependencies of DEMO activities on ITER and IFMIF.

- Conceptual design to be complete in 2020
- Engineering design complete, and decision to build, in 2030
- Construction from 2031 to 2043
- Operation from 2044, Electricity generation demonstration 2048

This 2012 roadmap was intended to be updated in 2015 and 2019. The EFDA was superseded by EUROfusion in 2013. The roadmap was subsequently updated in 2018.

- Conceptual design to be complete before 2030
- Engineering design 2030-2040
- Construction from 2040

This would imply operations commencing sometime in the 2050s.

== Technical considerations ==
The deuterium-tritium (D-T) fusion reaction is considered the most promising for producing fusion power.

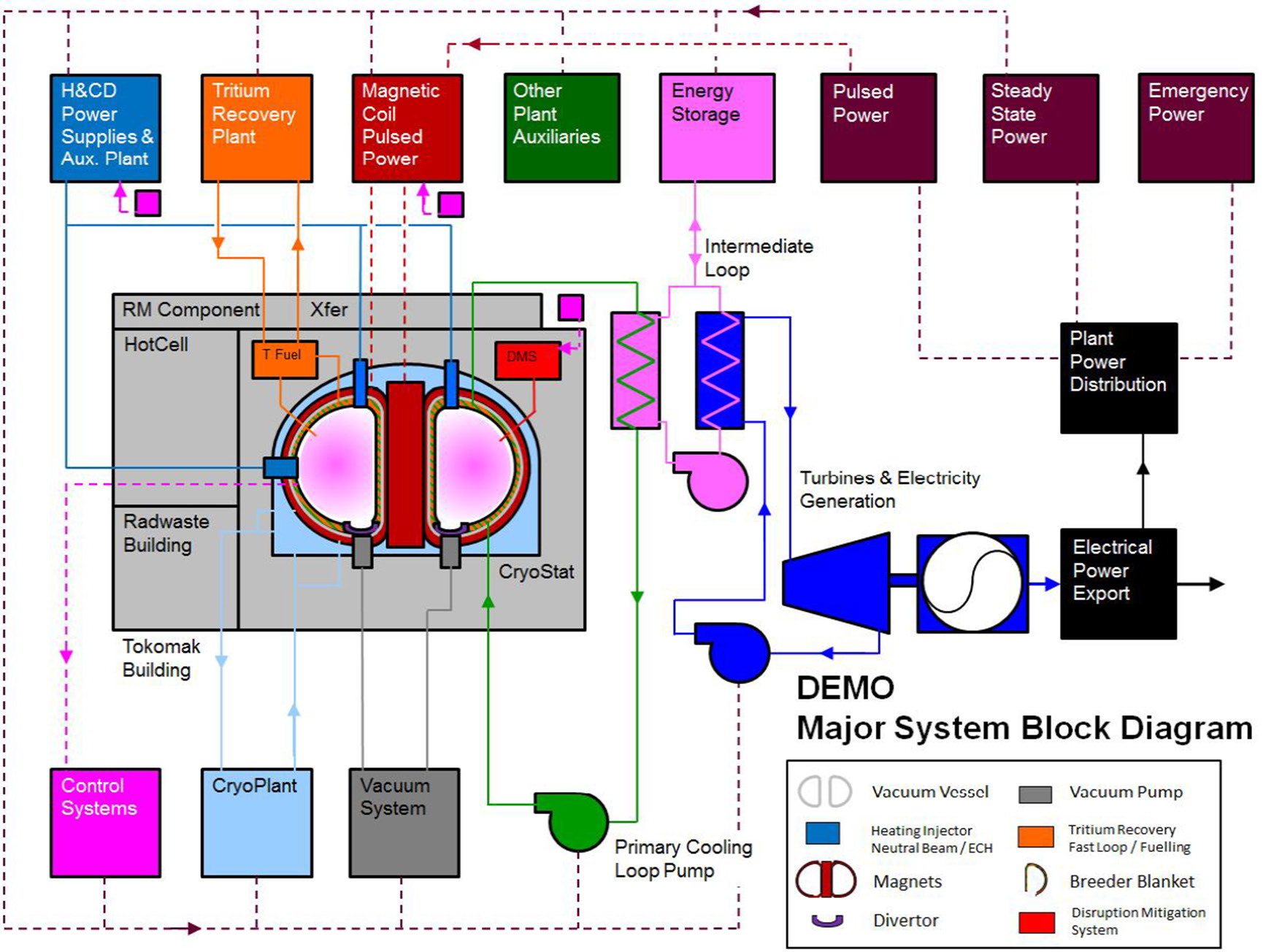
Schematic of a DEMO nuclear fusion power plant

When deuterium and tritium fuse, the two nuclei come together to form a resonant state which splits to form in turn a helium nucleus (an alpha particle) and a high-energy neutron.

^{2}_{1}H + ^{3}_{1}H → ^{4}_{2}He + ^{1}_{0}n + 17.6 MeV

DEMO will be constructed once designs which solve the many problems of current fusion reactors are engineered. These problems include: containing the plasma fuel at high temperatures, maintaining a great enough density of reacting ions, and capturing high-energy neutrons from the reaction without melting the walls of the reactor.

- The activation energy for fusion is very large because the protons in each nucleus strongly repel one another; they are both positively charged. In order to fuse, the nuclei must be within 1 femtometre (1 × 10^{−15} metres) of each other, where quantum-tunnelling effects permit the parent nuclei to fuse together into the resonant state. The principle is to form a quasi-Maxwellian distribution for the deuterons and the tritons, at very high temperatures, where the nuclei in the tail of the Maxwellian undergo fusion, while the continuous elastic collisions among the other nuclei will not alter the state of the plasma.
- DEMO, a Tokamak reactor, requires both dense plasma and high temperatures for the fusion reaction to be sustained.
- High temperatures give the nuclei enough energy to overcome their electrostatic repulsion. This requires temperatures in the region of 100MK, and is achieved using energy from various sources, including Ohmic heating (from electric currents induced in the plasma), microwaves, ion beams, or neutral beam injection.
- Containment vessels melt at these temperatures, so the plasma is to be kept away from the walls using magnetic confinement.

Once fusion has begun, high-energy neutrons at about 160GK will flood out of the plasma along with X-rays, neither being affected by the strong magnetic fields. Since neutrons receive the majority of the energy from the fusion, they will be the reactor's main source of thermal energy output. The ultra-hot helium product at roughly 40GK will remain behind (temporarily) to heat the plasma, and must make up for all the loss mechanisms (mostly bremsstrahlung X-rays from electron deceleration) which tend to cool the plasma rather quickly.

- The Tokamak containment vessel will have a lining composed of ceramic or composite tiles containing tubes in which warm liquid lithium metal will flow, cooling the lining.
- Lithium readily absorbs high-speed neutrons to form helium and tritium, becoming hot in the process.
- This increase in temperature is passed on to another (intermediate) coolant, possibly (pressurized) liquid water in a sealed, pressurized pipe. Lithium (especially when molten) reacts violently with water, even the humidity in the air, and the moisture in other substances, releasing hydrogen gas, which may catch fire explosively.
- Heat from the intermediate coolant will be used to boil water in a heat exchanger.
- Steam from the heat exchanger will be used to drive turbines and generators, to create electric current.
- Waste heat energy in excess of the generated electrical energy is dumped into the environment.
- Helium byproduct is the "ash" of this fusion, and will not be allowed to accumulate too much in the plasma.
- Carefully measured amounts of deuterium and tritium are added back into the plasma and heated.
- The lithium is processed to remove the helium and tritium, with the balance recycled to collect more heat and neutrons. Only a tiny amount of lithium is consumed.

The DEMO project is planned to build upon and improve the concepts of ITER. Since it is only proposed at this time, many of the details, including heating methods and the method for the capture of high-energy neutrons, are still undetermined.

== Conceptual design ==
All aspects of DEMO were discussed in detail in a 2009 document by the Euratom-UKAEA Fusion Association. Four conceptual designs PPCS A, B, C, D were studied. Challenges identified included:

- structural materials resistant to the high neutron flux
- high-temperature superconductors, to avoid the need for large amounts of helium for cooling, that would challenge world helium reserves
- need for high efficiency in the heating and current drive systems.

In the 2012 timeline, the conceptual design should be completed in 2020.

== Radioactive waste ==
While fusion reactors like ITER and DEMO will produce neither transuranic nor fission product wastes, which together make up the bulk of the nuclear wastes produced by fission reactors, some of the components of the ITER and DEMO reactors will become radioactive due to neutrons impinging upon them. It is hoped that plasma facing materials will be developed so that wastes produced in this way will have much shorter half lives than the waste from fission reactors, with wastes remaining harmful for less than one century. Development of these materials is the prime purpose of the International Fusion Materials Irradiation Facility. The process of manufacturing tritium currently comes with production of long-lived waste. However, while early-stage ITER's tritium will mainly come from the current operation of heavy-water CANDU fission reactors, late-stage ITER (to some extent) and DEMO should be able to produce its own tritium thanks to tritium breeding, dispensing with the fission reactor currently used for this purpose.

== PROTO ==
PROTO was a proposal for a beyond-DEMO experiment, part of the European Commission long-term strategy for research of fusion energy. PROTO would act as a prototype power station, taking in any remaining technology refinements, and demonstrating electricity generation on a commercial basis. It was only expected after DEMO, beyond 2050, and probably will not be the second part of a DEMO/PROTO experiment as it no longer appears in official documentation.

== See also ==
- China Fusion Engineering Test Reactor
- COLEX process
- ITER
- List of plasma physics software
- PROTO
- Spherical Tokamak for Energy Production
