= FuseNet =

FuseNet Association
- Established: 2008; 17 years ago
- Chairman: Dr. R.J.E. (Roger) Jaspers
- Affiliations: The European Fusion Education Network
- Website: www.fusenet.eu

FuseNet is a nuclear fusion focused educational organization. Between 2008 and 2013 it was funded by a European Union grant under EURATOM: Fusion Energy Research.

== The FP7 Project ==
The purpose of FuseNet is to coordinate and facilitate fusion education, to share best practices, to jointly develop educational tools, to organize educational events. The members of FuseNet have jointly established academic criteria for the award of European Fusion Doctorate and Master Certificates. These criteria are set to stimulate a high level of fusion education throughout Europe.

== The Association ==
FuseNet is the umbrella organization and single voice for the training and education of the next generation fusion engineers and scientists. FuseNet is recognized as such by the European Commission.
