= ITER =

International nuclear fusion research and engineering megaproject

Coordinates: 43.70831°N 5.77741°E

- Participating members as of 2021 (partners not shown)
- Formation: 24 October 2007; 19 years ago
- Headquarters: Saint-Paul-lès-Durance, France
- Members: China; European Union; India; Japan; South Korea; Russia; United States; Partners: Australia; Canada; Kazakhstan; Thailand
- Director-General: Pietro Barabaschi
- Website: iter.org

ITER
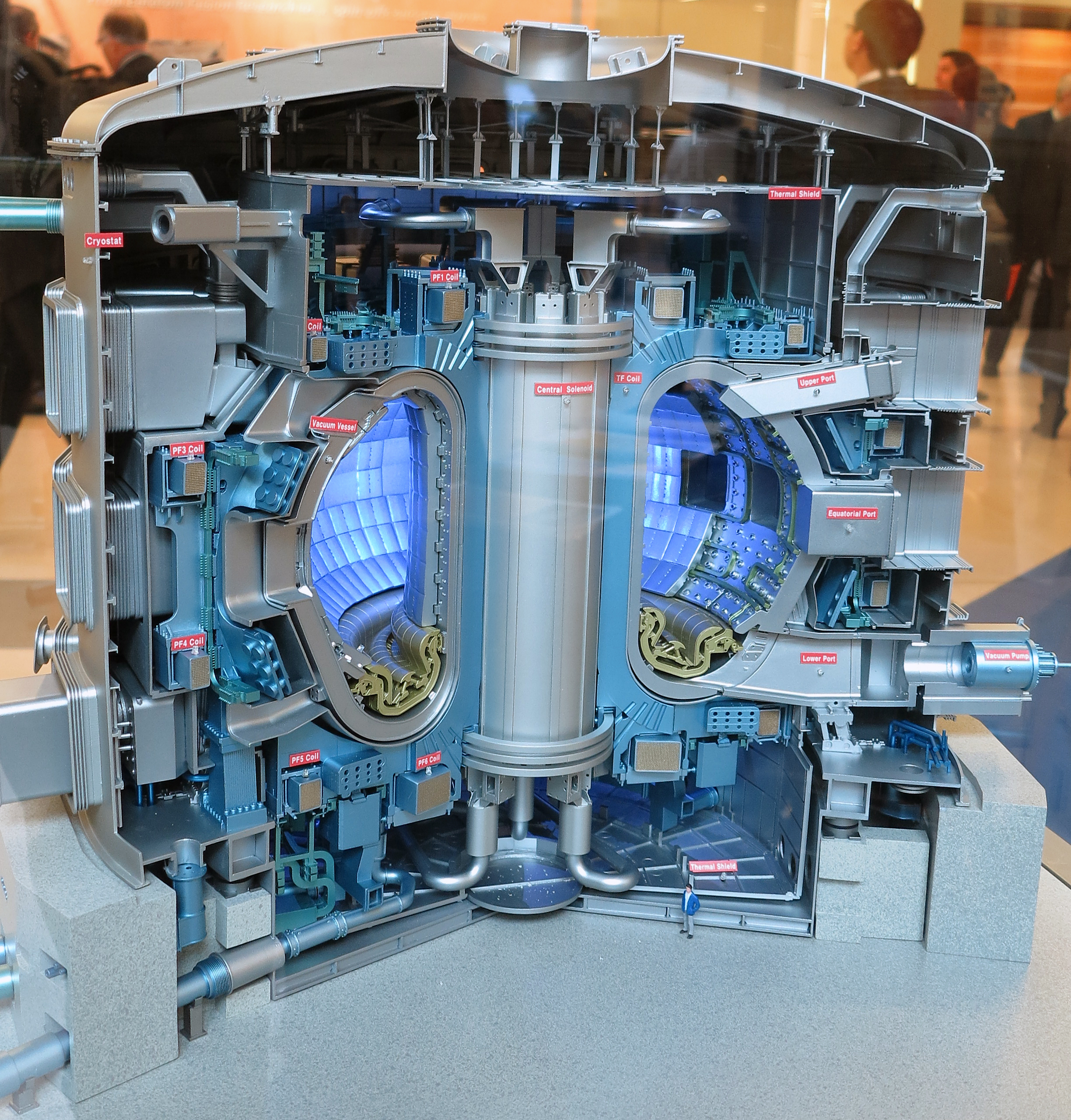
- Small-scale model of ITER
- Device type: Tokamak
- Location: Saint-Paul-lès-Durance, France

Technical specifications
- Major radius: 6.2 m (20 ft)
- Plasma volume: 840 m^{3}
- Magnetic field: 11.8 T (peak toroidal field on coil); 5.3 T (toroidal field on axis); 6 T (peak poloidal field on coil)
- Heating power: 320 MW (electrical input); 50 MW (thermal absorbed)
- Fusion power: 0 MW (electrical generation); 500 MW (thermal from fusion)
- Discharge duration: Up to 1,000 seconds

History
- Date(s) of construction: 2013–2034

ITER (originally an acronym for International Thermonuclear Experimental Reactor, and also meaning "the way" or "the path" in Latin) is an international nuclear fusion research and engineering project designed to demonstrate the feasibility of fusion power. The facility is under construction near the Cadarache research center in southern France. ITER has been under construction since 2013. It is expected to achieve first plasma in 2033–2034, at which point it will be the world's largest fusion reactor, with a plasma volume about six times that of Japan's JT-60SA, previously the largest tokamak.

The long-term goal of fusion research is to generate electricity; ITER's stated purpose is scientific research, and technological demonstration of a large fusion reactor, without electricity generation. ITER's goals include to achieve fusion energy gain factors (Q, the ratio of thermal output power to thermal power absorbed by the plasma) of Q = 10 momentarily and Q = 5 at steady state; to develop fusion power technologies including superconducting magnets, cryogenics, heating, control and diagnostics systems, and remote handling; to study burning plasma; to test tritium breeding; and to demonstrate the safety of a fusion plant.

ITER is funded and operated by seven member parties: China, the European Union (EU), India, Japan, Russia, South Korea and the United States. In the immediate aftermath of Brexit, the United Kingdom continued to participate in ITER through the EU's Fusion for Energy (F4E) program until September 2023. Switzerland participated through Euratom and F4E until 2021, though it is poised to rejoin in 2026 following subsequent negotiations with the EU. ITER also has cooperation agreements with Australia, Canada, Kazakhstan and Thailand.

Construction of the ITER complex in France started in 2013, and assembly of the tokamak began in 2020. The initial budget was close to €6 billion, but the total price of construction and operations is projected to be from €18 to €22 billion; other estimates place the total cost between $45 billion and $65 billion, though these figures are disputed by ITER. Regardless of the final cost, ITER has already been described as the most expensive science experiment of all time, the most complicated engineering project in human history, and one of the most ambitious human collaborations since the development of the International Space Station (€100 billion or $150 billion budget) and the Large Hadron Collider (€7.5 billion budget). (Note: Other large projects include the F-35 Fighter Jet Program ($1.5 trillion), the Manhattan Project ($30.6 billion), the Apollo program ($156 billion), and the James Webb Space Telescope ($9.8 billion).)

ITER's planned successor, the EUROfusion-led DEMO, is expected to be one of the first fusion reactors to produce electricity in an experimental environment.

== Background ==
ITER will produce energy by fusing deuterium and tritium into helium.

Fusion aims to replicate the process that takes place in stars where the intense heat at the core fuses together nuclei and produces large amounts of energy in the form of heat and light. Harnessing fusion power in terrestrial conditions would provide sufficient energy to satisfy mounting demand, and to do so in a sustainable manner that has a relatively small impact on the environment. One gram of deuterium-tritium fuel mixture in the process of nuclear fusion produces 90,000-kilowatt hours of energy, or the equivalent of 11 tonnes of coal.

Nuclear fusion uses a different approach from traditional nuclear energy. Current nuclear power stations rely on nuclear fission with the nucleus of an atom being split to release energy. Nuclear fusion takes multiple nuclei and uses intense heat to fuse them together, a process that also releases energy.

Nuclear fusion has many potential attractions. The fuel is relatively abundant or can be produced in a fusion reactor. After preliminary tests with deuterium, ITER will use a mix of deuterium-tritium for its fusion because of the combination's high energy potential and because this fusion reaction is the easiest to run. The first isotope, deuterium, can be extracted from seawater, from which it is a nearly inexhaustible resource. The second isotope, tritium, only occurs in trace amounts in nature and the estimated world's supply (mainly produced by the heavy-water CANDU fission reactors) is just 20 kilograms per year, insufficient for power plants. ITER will be testing tritium breeding blanket technology that would allow a future fusion reactor to create its own tritium and thus be self-sufficient. Furthermore, a fusion reactor would produce virtually no CO_{2} emissions or atmospheric pollutants, there would be no chance of a meltdown, and its radioactive waste products would mostly be very short-lived compared to those produced by conventional nuclear reactors (fission reactors).

On 21 November 2006, the seven project partners formally agreed to fund the creation of a nuclear fusion reactor. The program is anticipated to last for 30 years – 10 years for construction, and 20 years of operation. ITER was originally expected to cost approximately €5 billion. However, delays, the rising price of raw materials, and changes to the initial design have seen the official budget estimate rise to between €18 billion and €20 billion.

The reactor was expected to take 10 years to build, and ITER had planned to test its first plasma in 2020 and achieve full fusion by 2023. In 2024, ITER published a new schedule with deuterium-deuterium plasma operations starting in 2035. Site preparation has begun near Cadarache center, France, and French President Emmanuel Macron launched the assembly phase of the project at a ceremony in 2020. Under the revised schedule, work to achieve the first hydrogen plasma discharge was 70% complete in the middle of 2020 and considered to be on track.

One of the ITER objectives is a Q-value ("fusion gain") of 10. Q = 1 is called "breakeven". The best result achieved in a tokamak is 0.67 in the JET tokamak. The best result achieved for fusion in general is Q = 4.13, achieved in an inertial confinement fusion (ICF) experiment by the National Ignition Facility in April 2025.

For commercial fusion power stations, engineering gain factor is important. Engineering gain factor is defined as the ratio of a plant electrical power output to electrical power input of all plant's internal systems (tokamak external heating systems, electromagnets, cryogenics plant, diagnostics and control systems, etc.). Commercial fusion plants will be designed with engineering breakeven in mind (see DEMO). Some nuclear engineers consider a Q of 100 to be required for commercial fusion power stations to be viable.

ITER will not produce electricity. Producing electricity from thermal sources is a well-known process (used in many power stations) and ITER will not run with significant fusion power output continuously. Adding electricity production to ITER would raise the cost of the project and bring no value for experiments on the tokamak. The DEMO-class reactors that are planned to follow ITER are intended to demonstrate the net production of electricity.

One of the primary ITER objectives is to achieve a state of "burning plasma". Burning plasma is the state of the plasma when more than 50% of the energy received for plasma heating is received from fusion reactions (not from external sources). No fusion reactors had created a burning plasma until the competing NIF fusion project reached the milestone on 8 August 2021 using inertial confinement. At higher Q_{DT} values, progressively bigger parts of plasma heating power will be produced by fusion reactions. This reduces the power needed from external heating systems at high Q_{DT} values. The bigger a tokamak is, the more fusion-reaction-produced energy is preserved for internal plasma heating (and the less external heating is required), which also improves its Q-value. This is how ITER plans for its tokamak reactor to scale.

ITER's thermonuclear fusion reactor will use over 300 MW of electrical power to cause the plasma to absorb 50 MW of thermal power, creating 500 MW of heat from fusion for periods of 400 to 600 seconds. This would mean a ten-fold gain of plasma heating power Q_{DT}, as measured by heating input to thermal output, or Q_{DT} ≥ 10. The record value of the ratio of the fusion power produced in the core of a tokamak to the applied heating power entering the core Q_{core} is 1.3 in the JET Joint European Torus experiment calculated using the TRANSP code As of 2022, the record for energy production using nuclear fusion is held by the National Ignition Facility reactor, which achieved a Q_{core} of 1.5 in December 2022. Beyond just heating the plasma, the total electricity consumed by the reactor and facilities will range from 110 MW up to 620 MW peak for 30-second periods during plasma operation. As a research reactor, the heat energy generated will not be converted to electricity, but simply vented.

== Organisation history ==
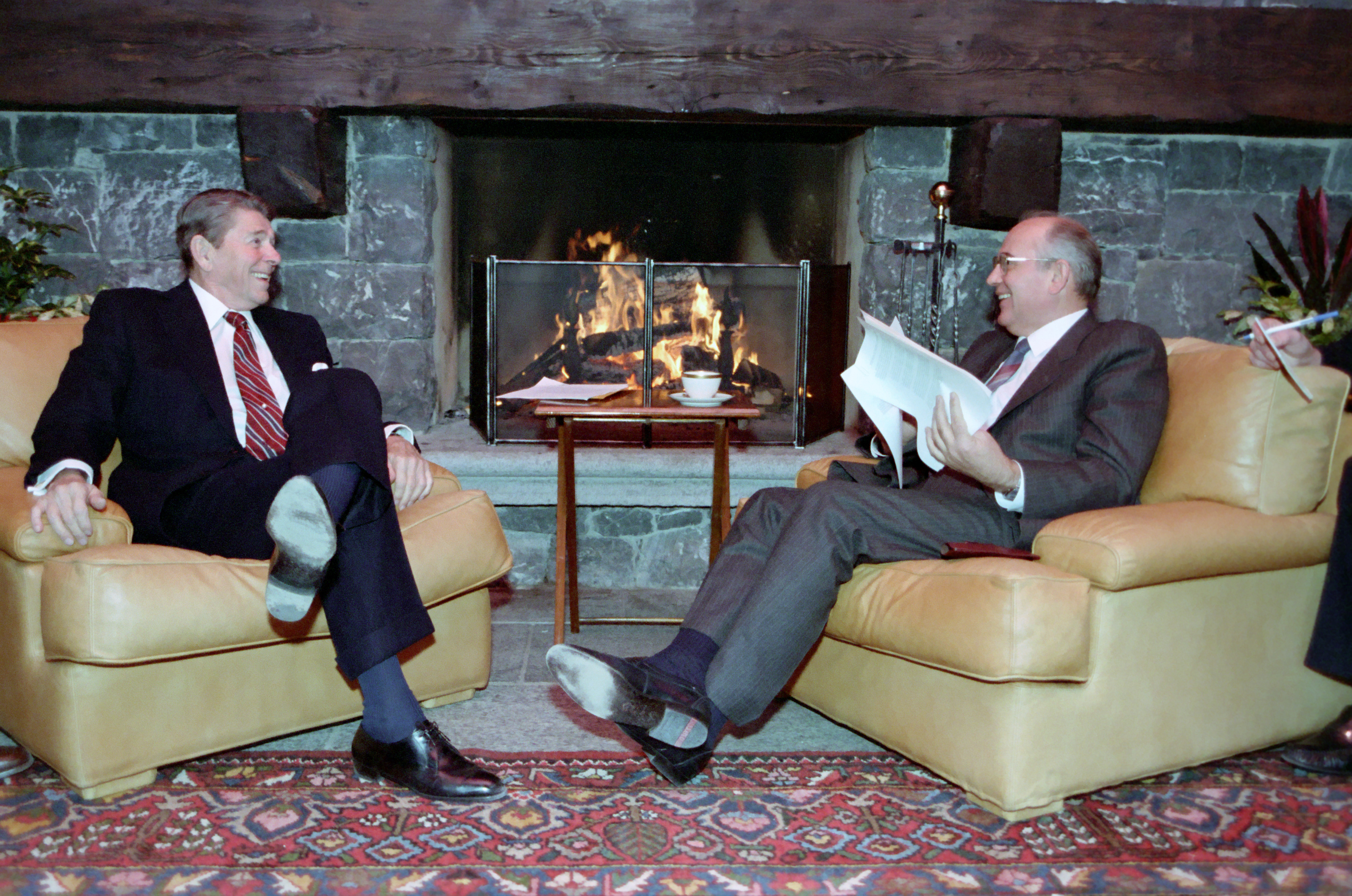
Ronald Reagan and Mikhail Gorbachev at the Geneva Summit in 1985

The initial international cooperation for a nuclear fusion project that was the foundation of ITER began in 1978 with the International Tokamak Reactor, or INTOR, which had four partners: the Soviet Union, the European Atomic Energy Community, the United States, and Japan. However, the INTOR project stalled until Mikhail Gorbachev became general secretary of the Communist Party of the Soviet Union in March 1985. Gorbachev first revived interest in a collaborative fusion project in an October 1985 meeting with French President François Mitterrand, and then the idea was further developed in November 1985 at the Geneva Summit with Ronald Reagan.

Preparations for the Gorbachev-Reagan summit showed that there were no tangible agreements in the works for the summit. However, the ITER project was gaining momentum in political circles due to the quiet work being done by two physicists, the American scientist Alvin Trivelpiece who served as Director of the Office of Energy Research in the 1980s and the Russian scientist Evgeny Velikhov who would become head of the Kurchatov Institute for nuclear research. The two scientists both supported a project to construct a demonstration fusion reactor. At the time, magnetic fusion research was ongoing in Japan, Europe, the Soviet Union and the US, but Trivelpiece and Velikhov believed that taking the next step in fusion research would be beyond the budget of any of the key nations and that collaboration would be useful internationally.

Michael Robert, who is the director of International Programs of the Office of Fusion Energy at the US Department of Energy, explains that, 'In September 1985, I led a US science team to Moscow as part of our bilateral fusion activities. Velikhov proposed to me at lunch one day his idea of having the USSR and USA work together to proceed to a fusion reactor. My response was 'great idea', but from my position, I have no capability of pushing that idea upward to the President.'

This push for cooperation on nuclear fusion is cited as a key moment of science diplomacy, but nonetheless a major bureaucratic fight erupted in the US government over the project. One argument against collaboration was that the Soviets would use it to steal US technology and expertise. A second was symbolic and involved American criticism of how the Soviet physicist Andrei Sakharov was being treated. Sakharov was an early proponent of the peaceful use of nuclear technology and along with Igor Tamm he developed the idea for the tokamak that is at the heart of nuclear fusion research. However, Sakharov also supported broader civil liberties in the Soviet Union, and his activism earned him both the 1975 Nobel peace prize and internal exile in Russia, which he opposed by going on multiple hunger strikes. The United States National Security Council convened a meeting under the direction of William Flynn Martin to discuss the nuclear fusion project that resulted in a consensus that the US should go forward with the project.

Martin, as Executive Secretary (Chief of Staff) of the National Security Council, accompanied President Reagan to the Geneva Summit, where he concluded the agreement with Gorbachev’s science advisor Evgeny Velikhov. This led to nuclear fusion cooperation being discussed at the Geneva summit and release of a historic joint statement from Reagan and Gorbachev that emphasized, "the potential importance of the work aimed at utilizing controlled thermonuclear fusion for peaceful purposes and, in this connection, advocated the widest practicable development of international cooperation in obtaining this source of energy, which is essentially inexhaustible, for the benefit of all mankind." For the fusion community, this statement was a breakthrough, and it was reinforced when Reagan evoked the possibilities of nuclear fusion in a Joint Session of Congress later in the month.

As a result, collaboration on an international fusion experiment began to move forward. In October 1986 at the Reykjavik Summit, the so-called 'Quadripartite Initiative Committee' (Europe through the Euratom countries, Japan, USSR, and the US) was formed to oversee the development of the project. The year after, in March 1987, the Quadripartite Initiative Committee met at the International Atomic Energy Agency (IAEA) headquarters in Vienna. This meeting marked the launch of the conceptual design studies for the experimental reactors as well as the start of negotiations for operational issues such as the legal foundations for the peaceful use of fusion technology, the organizational structure and staffing, and the eventual location for the project. This meeting in Vienna was also where the project was baptized the International Thermonuclear Experimental Reactor, though it was quickly called by its abbreviation alone and its Latin meaning of 'the way'.

Conceptual and engineering design phases were carried out under the auspices of the IAEA. The original technical objectives were established in 1992 and the original Engineering Design Activities (EDA) were completed in 1998. An acceptable, detailed design was validated in July 2001 to complete the extended EDA period, and the validated design then went through a Design Review that began November 2006 and concluded in December 2007. The design process was difficult with arguments over issues such as whether there should be circular cross sections for magnetic confinement or D-shaped cross sections. These issues were partly responsible for the United States temporarily exiting the project in 1998 before rejoining in 2003.

At this same time, the group of ITER partners was expanding; China and South Korea joined the project in 2003 and India formally joined in 2005.

There was a heated competition to host the ITER project with the candidates narrowed down to two possible sites: France and Japan. Russia, China, and the European Union supported the choice of Cadarache in France, while the United States, South Korea, and Japan support the choice of Rokkasho in Japan. In June 2005, it was officially announced that ITER would be built in the South of France at the Cadarache site. The negotiations that led to the decision ended in a compromise between the EU and Japan, in that Japan was promised 20% of the research staff on the French location of ITER, as well as the head of the administrative body of ITER. In addition, it was agreed that 8% of the ITER construction budget would go to partner facilities that would be built in Japan.

On 21 November 2006, at a ceremony hosted by French President Jacques Chirac at the Élysée Palace in Paris, an international consortium signed a formal agreement to build the reactor. Initial work to clear the site for construction began in Cadarache in March 2007 and, once this agreement was ratified by all partners, the ITER Organization was officially established on 24 October 2007.

In 2016, Australia became the first non-member partner of the project. ITER signed a technical cooperation agreement with the Australian Nuclear Science and Technology Organisation (ANSTO), granting this country access to research results of ITER in exchange for the construction of selected parts of the ITER machine. In 2017, Kazakhstan signed a cooperation agreement that laid the groundwork for technical collaboration between the National Nuclear Center of the Republic of Kazakhstan and ITER. Most recently, after collaborating with ITER in the early stages of the project, Canada signed a cooperation agreement in 2020 with a focus on tritium and tritium-related equipment.

The project began its assembly phase in July 2020, launched by French President Emmanuel Macron in the presence of other members of the ITER project.

== Directors-General ==
ITER is supervised by a governing body known as the ITER Council that is composed of representatives of the seven signatories to the ITER Agreement. The ITER Council is responsible for the overall direction of the organization and decides such issues as the budget. The ITER Council also appoints the director-general of the project. There have been five directors-general so far:

- 2005–2010: Kaname Ikeda
- 2010–2015: Osamu Motojima
- 2015–2022: Bernard Bigot
- 2022: Eisuke Tada (acting)
- 2022–present: Pietro Barabaschi

Bernard Bigot was appointed to reform the management and governance of the ITER project in 2015. In January 2019, the ITER Council voted unanimously to reappoint Bigot for a second five-year term. Bigot died on May 14, 2022, and his deputy Eisuke Tada took over leadership of ITER during the search process for the new director.

== Objectives ==
ITER's stated mission is to demonstrate the feasibility of fusion power as a large-scale, carbon-free source of energy. More specifically, the project has aims to:

- Momentarily produce a fusion plasma with thermal power ten times greater than the injected thermal power (a Q_{DT} value of 10).
- Produce a steady-state plasma with a Q_{DT} value greater than 5. (Q_{DT} = 1 is scientific breakeven, as defined in fusion energy gain factor.)
- Maintain a fusion pulse for up to 8 minutes.
- Develop technologies and processes needed for a fusion power station — including superconducting magnets and remote handling (maintenance by robot).
- Verify tritium breeding concepts.
- Refine neutron shield / heat conversion technology (most of the energy in the D+T fusion reaction is released in the form of fast neutrons).
- Experiment with burning plasma state.

The objectives of the ITER project are not limited to creating the nuclear fusion device but are much broader, including building necessary technical, organizational, and logistical capabilities, skills, tools, supply chains, and culture enabling management of such megaprojects among participating countries, bootstrapping their local nuclear fusion industries.

== Timeline and status ==
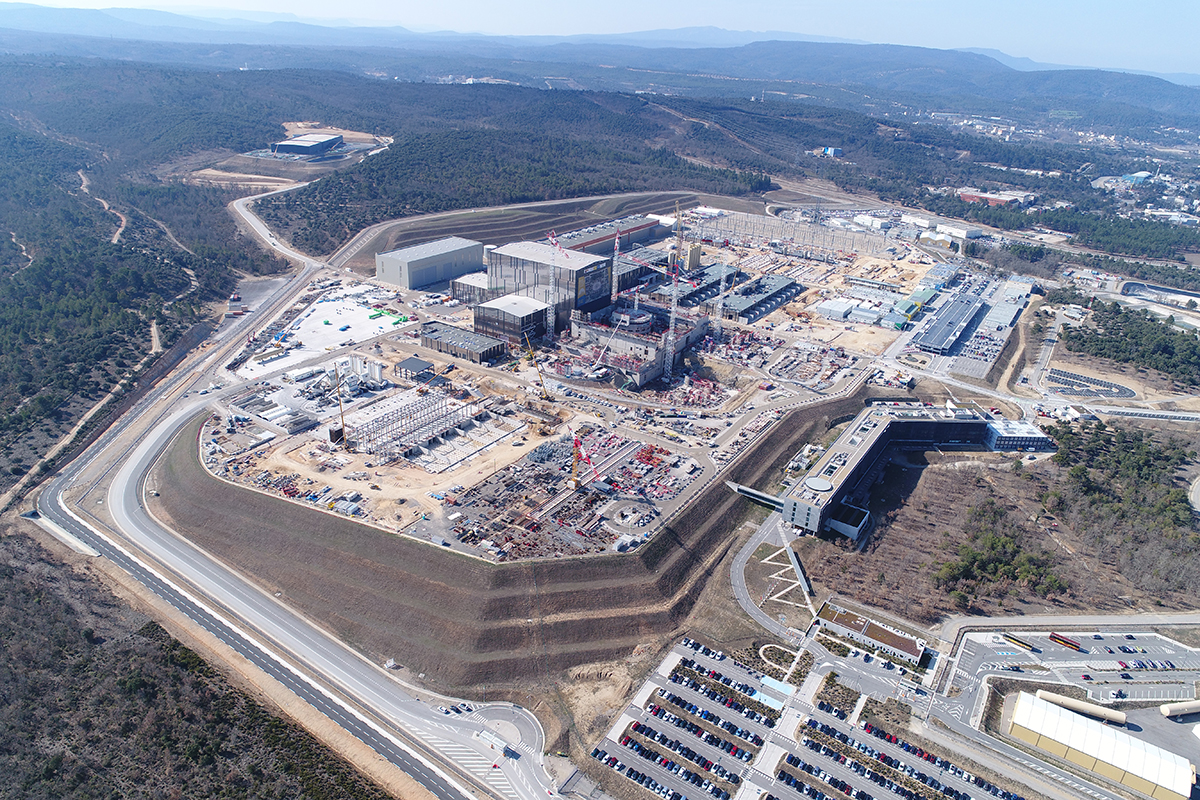
Aerial view of the ITER site in 2018

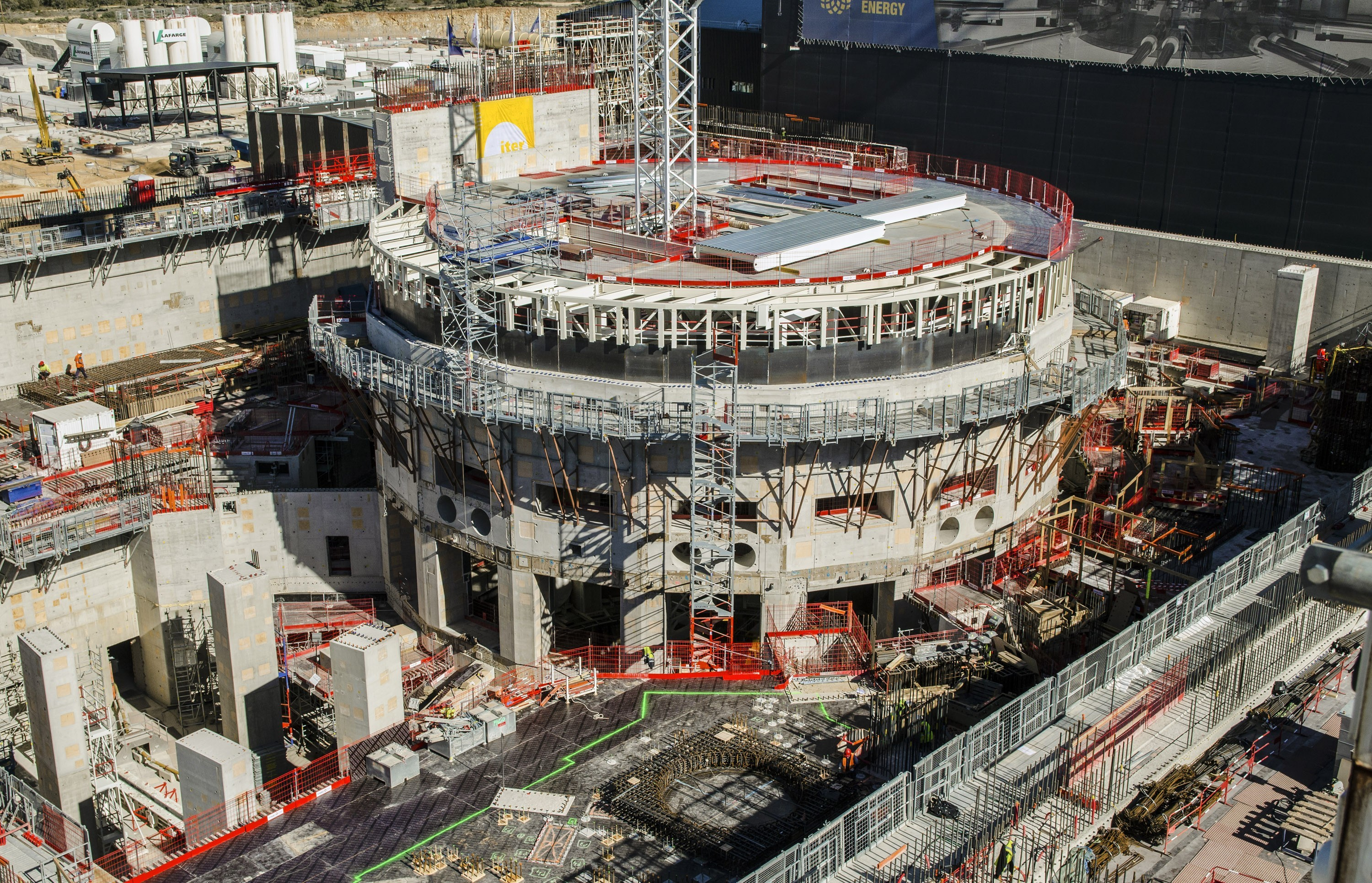
ITER construction status in 2018

Aerial view of the ITER site in 2020

As of April 2022 ITER was near 85% complete toward first plasma. First plasma was scheduled for late 2025, however delays were acknowledged in 2023 which would impact this target. In July 2024, ITER announced a new schedule which included full plasma current in 2034, the start of operations with a deuterium-deuterium plasma in 2035, and deuterium-tritium operations in 2039.

The start of the project can be traced back to 1978 when the European Commission, Japan, United States, and USSR joined for the International Tokamak Reactor (INTOR) Workshop. This initiative was held under the auspices of the International Atomic Energy Agency and its goals were to assess the readiness of magnetic fusion to move forward to the experimental power reactor (EPR) stage, to identify the additional R&D that must be undertaken, and to define the characteristics of such an EPR by means of a conceptual design. From 1978 to the middle of the 1980s, hundreds of fusion scientists and engineers in each participating country took part in a detailed assessment of the tokamak confinement system and the design possibilities for harnessing nuclear fusion energy.

At the Geneva summit meeting in 1985, Mikhail Gorbachev suggested to Ronald Reagan that the two countries jointly undertake the construction of a tokamak EPR as proposed by the INTOR Workshop. The ITER project was initiated in 1988.

Ground was broken in 2007 and construction of the ITER tokamak complex started in 2013.

Machine assembly was launched on 28 July 2020. Under the revised schedule, cryostat closure is planned for 2033, integrated commissioning for 2033–2034, and the Start of Research Operation for 2034. When ITER becomes operational, it will be the largest magnetic confinement plasma physics experiment in use with a plasma volume of 840 cubic meters, surpassing the Joint European Torus by a factor of 8.

In 2023, the ITER organization made the official decision to replace the material of the plasma facing first wall from beryllium to tungsten. This was done to align ITER with the consensus of all future burning plasma designs using tungsten as armoring material. In addition, there were many concerns about using beryllium as the primary first wall material. Beryllium is a highly toxic metal and the dust generated through erosion raised safety concerns for maintenance. Recent modeling had also suggested that strong melting would occur during off-normal plasma events leading to a premature failure of the first wall.

On 3 July 2024, ITER director-general Pietro Barabaschi announced the first plasma production in the project will not take place until, at least, 2033. The energy from magnets will be produced no earlier than 2036, rather than 2033, as previously planned in 2016. He additionally said the cost of repairing some malfunctioning pieces was estimated at €5 billion.

Project milestones
Date	Event
1988	ITER project officially initiated. Conceptual design activities ran from 1988 to 1990.
1992	Engineering design activities from 1992 to 1998.
2006	Approval of a cost estimate of €10 billion (US$12.8 billion) projecting the start of construction in 2008 and completion a decade later.
2007	Site construction begins
2008	Site preparation start, ITER itinerary start.
2009	Site preparation completion.
2010	Tokamak complex excavation starts.
2013	Tokamak complex construction starts.
2015	Tokamak construction starts, but the schedule is extended by at least six years.
2017	Assembly Hall ready for equipment.
2018–2026	Assembly and integration: December 2018: concrete support finished.; July 2019: bottom and lower cylinder of the cryostat assembled from pieces.; April 2020: first vacuum vessel sector completed.; May 2020: bottom of the cryostat installed, tokamak assembly started.; July 2020: machine assembly formally launched.; October 2020: start welding vacuum vessel together.; June 2026: central solenoid stack completed.; September 2026: final vacuum vessel sector completed.
2026–2033	Planned: Assembly and integration
2033–2034	Planned: Assembly ends; commissioning phase starts.; Planned: Achievement of first plasma.
2035	Planned: Start of deuterium–deuterium plasma operation.
2039	Planned: Start of deuterium–tritium plasma operation.

== Reactor overview ==
When deuterium and tritium fuse, two nuclei come together to form a helium nucleus (an alpha particle), and a high-energy neutron.

^{2}H + ^{3}H → ^{4}He + ^{1}_{0}n + 17.59 MeV

While nearly all stable isotopes lighter on the periodic table than iron-56 and nickel-62, which have the highest binding energy per nucleon, will fuse with some other isotope and release energy, deuterium and tritium are by far the most attractive for energy generation as they require the lowest activation energy (thus lowest temperature) to do so, while producing among the most energy per unit weight.

All proto- and mid-life stars radiate enormous amounts of energy generated by fusion processes. Deuterium–tritium fusion releases, per mass, roughly three times as much energy as uranium-235 fission, and millions of times more energy than a chemical reaction such as the burning of coal. It is the goal of a fusion power station to harness this energy to produce electricity.

Activation energies (in most fusion systems this is the temperature required to initiate the reaction) for fusion are generally high because the protons in each nucleus strongly repel one another, as they each have the same positive charge. A heuristic for estimating reaction rates is that nuclei must be able to get within 100 femtometers (10^{−13} meter) of each other, where the nuclei are increasingly likely to undergo quantum tunneling past the electrostatic barrier and the turning point where the strong nuclear force and the electrostatic force are equally balanced, allowing them to fuse. In ITER, this distance of approach is made possible by high temperatures and magnetic confinement. ITER uses cooling equipment like a cryopump to cool the magnets to near absolute zero. High temperatures give the nuclei enough energy to overcome their electrostatic repulsion (see Maxwell–Boltzmann distribution). For deuterium and tritium, the optimal reaction rates occur at temperatures higher than 10^{8} kelvin. At ITER, the plasma will be heated to 150 million kelvin (about ten times the temperature at the core of the Sun) by ohmic heating (running a current through the plasma). Additional heating is applied using neutral beam injection (which cross magnetic field lines without a net deflection and will not cause a large electromagnetic disruption) and radio frequency (RF) or microwave heating.

At such high temperatures, particles have a large kinetic energy, and hence speed. If unconfined, the particles will rapidly escape, taking the energy with them, cooling the plasma to the point where net energy is no longer produced. A successful reactor would need to contain the particles in a small enough volume for a long enough time for much of the plasma to fuse. In ITER and many other magnetic confinement reactors, the plasma, a gas of charged particles, is confined using magnetic fields. A charged particle moving through a magnetic field experiences a force perpendicular to the direction of travel, resulting in centripetal acceleration, thereby confining it to move in a circle or helix around the lines of magnetic flux. ITER will use four types of magnets to contain the plasma: a central solenoid magnet, poloidal magnets around the edges of the tokamak, 18 D-shaped toroidal-field coils, and correction coils.

A solid confinement vessel is also needed, both to shield the magnets and other equipment from high temperatures and energetic photons and particles, and to maintain a near-vacuum for the plasma to populate. The containment vessel is subjected to a barrage of very energetic particles, where electrons, ions, photons, alpha particles, and neutrons constantly bombard it and degrade the structure. The material must be designed to endure this environment so that a power station would be economical. Tests of such materials will be carried out both at ITER and at IFMIF (International Fusion Materials Irradiation Facility).

Once fusion has begun, high-energy neutrons will radiate from the reactive regions of the plasma, crossing magnetic field lines easily due to charge neutrality (see neutron flux). Since it is the neutrons that receive the majority of the energy, they will be ITER's primary source of energy output. Ideally, alpha particles will expend their energy in the plasma, further heating it.

The inner wall of the containment vessel will have 440 blanket modules that are designed to slow and absorb neutrons in a reliable and efficient manner and therefore protect the steel structure and the superconducting toroidal field magnets. At later stages of the ITER project, experimental blanket modules will be used to test breeding tritium for fuel from lithium-bearing ceramic pebbles contained within the blanket module following the following reactions:

^{1}_{0}n + ^{6}_{3}Li → ^{3}_{1}T + ^{4}_{2}He
^{1}_{0}n + ^{7}_{3}Li → ^{3}_{1}T + ^{4}_{2}He + ^{1}_{0}n

where the reactant neutron is supplied by the D-T fusion reaction.

Energy absorbed from the fast neutrons is extracted and passed into the primary coolant. This heat energy would then be used to power an electricity-generating turbine in a real power station; in ITER this electricity generating system is not of scientific interest, so instead the heat will be extracted and disposed of.

== Technical design ==
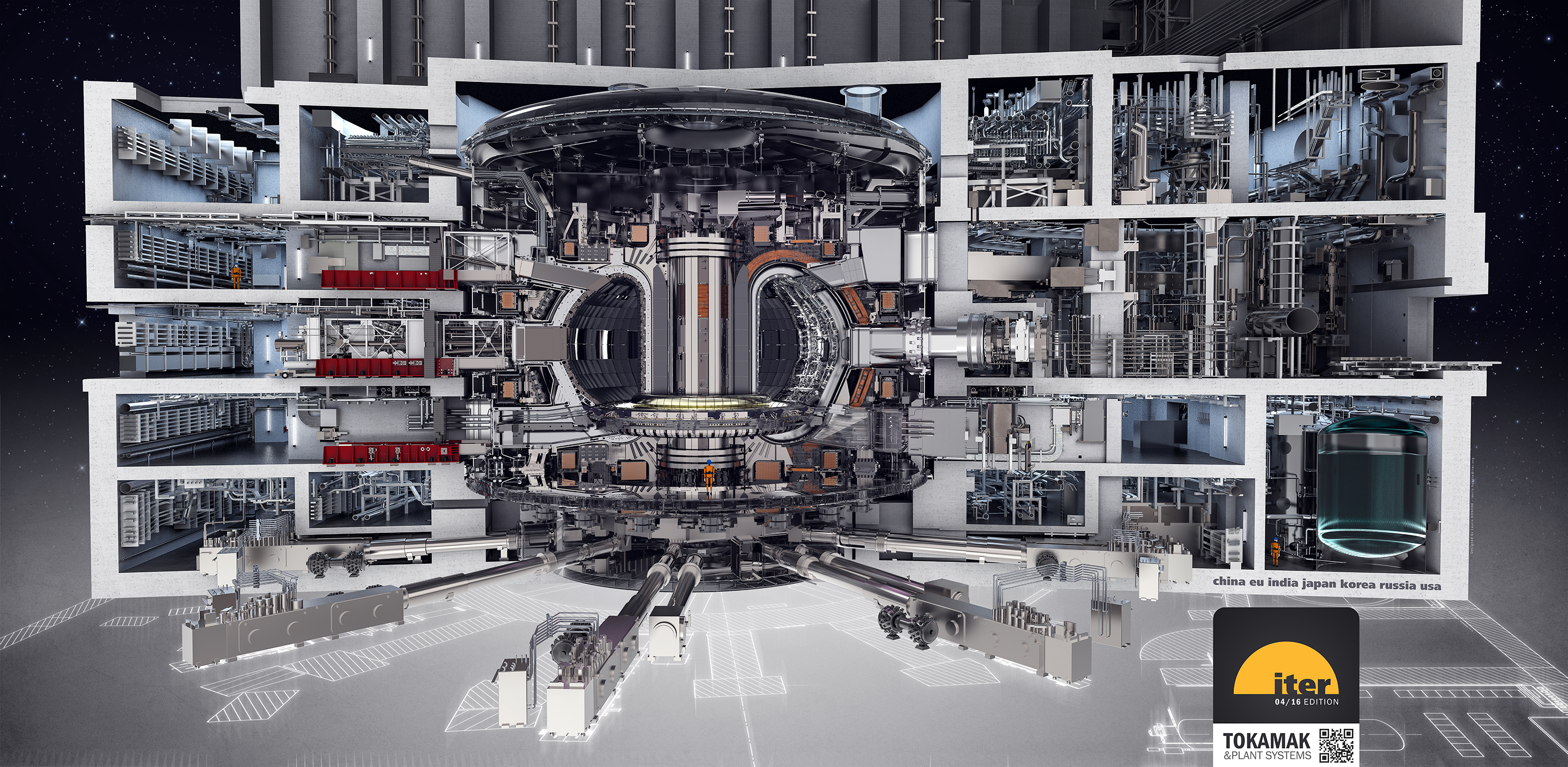
Drawing of the ITER tokamak and integrated plant systems

=== Vacuum vessel ===
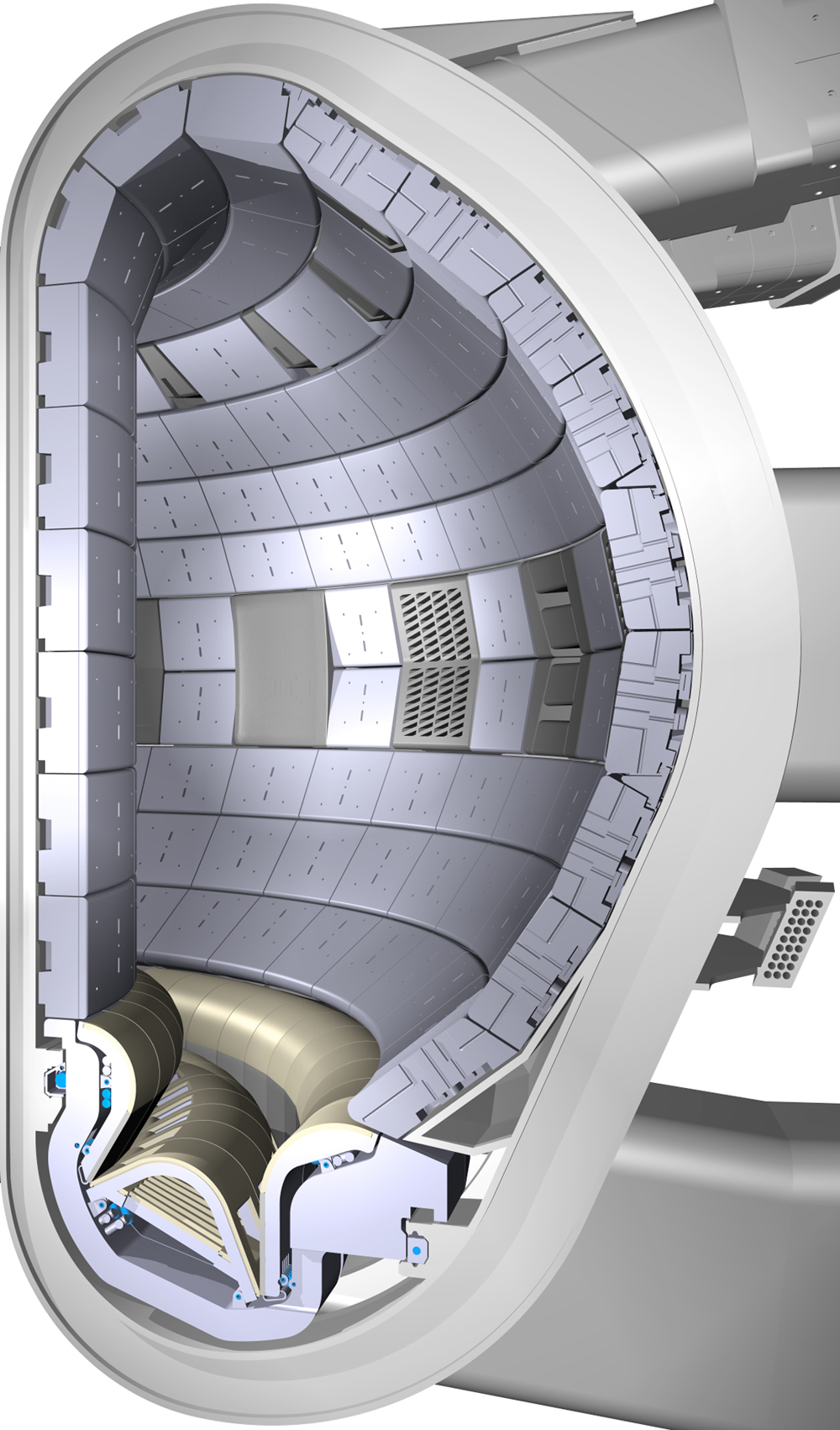
Cross-section of part of the planned ITER fusion reaction vessel

The vacuum vessel is the central part of the ITER machine: a double-walled steel container in which the plasma is contained by means of magnetic fields.

The ITER vacuum vessel will be twice as large and 16 times as heavy as any previously manufactured fusion vessel: each of the nine torus-shaped sectors will weigh approximately 450 tonnes. When all the shielding and port structures are included, this adds up to a total of 5,116 tonnes. Its external diameter will measure 19.4 metres (64 ft), the internal 6.5 metres (21 ft). Once assembled, the whole structure will be 11.3 metres (37 ft) high.

The primary function of the vacuum vessel is to provide a hermetically sealed plasma container. Its main components are the main vessel, the port structures and the supporting system. The main vessel is a double-walled structure with poloidal and toroidal stiffening ribs between 60-millimetre-thick (2.4 in) shells to reinforce the vessel structure. These ribs also form the flow passages for the cooling water. The space between the double walls will be filled with shield structures made of stainless steel. The inner surfaces of the vessel will act as the interface with breeder modules containing the breeder blanket component. These modules will provide shielding from the high-energy neutrons produced by the fusion reactions and some will also be used for tritium breeding concepts.

The vacuum vessel has a total of 44 openings that are known as ports – 18 upper, 17 equatorial, and 9 lower ports – that will be used for remote handling operations, diagnostic systems, neutral beam injections and vacuum pumping. Remote handling is made necessary by the radioactive interior of the reactor following a shutdown, which is caused by neutron bombardment during operation.

Vacuum pumping will be done before the start of fusion reactions to create the necessary low density environment, which is about one million times lower than the density of air.

=== Breeder blanket ===
ITER will use deuterium-tritium fuel. While deuterium is abundant in nature, tritium is much rarer because it is radioactive with a half-life of just 12.3 years and there are only about 3.5 kg of natural tritium on earth. Owing to this tiny supply of tritium, an important component for testing on ITER is the breeding blanket. This component, located in the ports of the vacuum vessel, serves to test the production of tritium by reaction with neutrons from the plasma. There are several reactions that produce tritium within the blanket. Lithium-6 produces tritium via (n,t) reactions with moderated neutrons, while Lithium-7 produces tritium via interactions with higher energy neutrons via (n,nt) reactions.

Concepts for the breeder blanket include helium-cooled lithium lead (HCLL), helium-cooled pebble bed (HCPB), and water-cooled lithium lead (WCLL) methods. Six different tritium breeding blanket mock-ups, known as Test Blanket Modules (TBM), will be tested in ITER and will share a common box geometry. Materials for use as breeder pebbles in the HCPB concept include lithium metatitanate and lithium orthosilicate. Requirements of breeder materials include good tritium production and extraction, mechanical stability and low levels of radioactive activation.

=== Magnet system ===
ITER is based on magnetic confinement fusion that uses magnetic fields to contain the fusion fuel in plasma form. The magnet system used in the ITER tokamak will be the largest superconducting magnet system ever built. The system will use four types of magnets to achieve plasma confinement: a central solenoid magnet, poloidal magnets, toroidal-field coils, and correction coils. The central solenoid coil will be 18 meters tall, 4.3 m wide, and weigh 1000 tonnes. It will use superconducting niobium–tin to carry 45 kA and produce a peak field of more than 13 teslas.

The 18 toroidal field coils will also use niobium-tin with a nominal peak field strength of 11.8 teslas and a stored magnetic energy of 41 gigajoules. Other lower field ITER magnets (poloidal field and correction coils) will use niobium–titanium for their superconducting elements.

=== Additional heating ===
To achieve fusion, plasma particles must be heated to temperatures that reach as high as 150 million °C. To achieve these extreme temperatures, multiple heating methods must be used. Within the tokamak itself, changing magnetic fields produce a heating effect but external heating is also required. There will be three types of external heating in ITER:

- Two one-million volt heating neutral beam injectors (HNB) that will each provide about 16.5MW to the burning plasma, with the possibility to add a third injector. The beams generate electrically charged deuterium ions that are accelerated through five grids to reach the required energy of 1MV and the beams can operate for the entire plasma pulse duration, a total of up to 3600 seconds. The prototype is being built at the Neutral Beam Test Facility (NBTF), which was constructed in Padua, Italy. There is also a smaller neutral beam that will be used for diagnostics to help detect the amount of helium ash inside the tokamak.
- An ion cyclotron resonance heating (ICRH) system that will inject 20 MW of electromagnetic power into the plasma by using antennas to generate radio waves that have the same rate of oscillation as the ions in the plasma.
- An electron cyclotron resonance heating (ECRH) system that will heat electrons in the plasma using a high-intensity beam of electromagnetic radiation.

=== Cryostat ===
The ITER cryostat is a large 3,850-tonne stainless steel structure surrounding the vacuum vessel and the superconducting magnets, with the purpose of providing a super-cool vacuum environment. Its thickness (ranging from 50 to 250 millimetres (2.0 to 9.8 in)) will allow it to withstand the stresses induced by atmospheric pressure acting on the enclosed volume of 8,500 cubic meters. On 9 June 2020, Larsen & Toubro completed the delivery and installation of the cryostat module. The cryostat is the major component of the tokamak complex, which sits on a seismically isolated base.

=== Divertor ===
The divertor is a device within the tokamak that allows for removal of waste and impurities from the plasma while the reactor is operating. At ITER, the divertor will extract heat and ash that are created by the fusion process, while also protecting the surrounding walls and reducing plasma contamination.

The ITER divertor, which has been compared to a massive ashtray, is primarily composed of tungsten. The divertor targets, which are the components directly exposed to the plasma, are made of tungsten due to its high melting point, low sputtering yield, and low tritium retention. The underlying structure of the divertor includes materials like copper alloy for heat conduction and stainless steel for structural support.

The divertor consists of 54 cassettes. Each cassette weighs roughly eight tonnes and measures 0.8 meters x 2.3 meters by 3.5 meters. The divertor design and construction is being overseen by the Fusion For Energy agency.

When the ITER tokamak is in operation, the plasma-facing units endure heat spikes as high as 20 megawatts per square metre, which is more than four times higher than what is experienced by a spacecraft entering Earth's atmosphere.

The testing of the divertor is being done at the ITER Divertor Test Facility (IDTF) in Russia. This facility was created at the Efremov Institute in Saint Petersburg as part of the ITER Procurement Arrangement that spreads design and manufacturing across the project's member countries.

=== Cooling systems ===
The ITER tokamak will use interconnected cooling systems to manage the heat generated during operation. Most of the heat will be removed by a primary water cooling loop, itself cooled by water from a secondary loop through a heat exchanger within the tokamak building's secondary confinement. The secondary cooling loop will be cooled by a larger complex, comprising a cooling tower, a 5 km (3.1 mi) pipeline supplying water from the Canal de Provence, and basins that allow cooling water to be cooled and tested for chemical contamination and tritium before being released into the river Durance. This system will need to dissipate an average power of 450 MW during the tokamak's operation. A liquid nitrogen system will provide a further 1300 kW of cooling to 80 K (−193.2 °C; −315.7 °F), and a liquid helium system will provide 75 kW of cooling to 4.5 K (−268.65 °C; −451.57 °F). The liquid helium system will be designed, manufactured, installed and commissioned by Air Liquide in France.

== Location ==
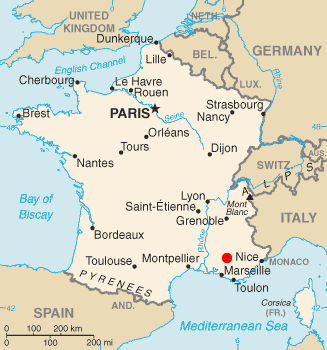
Location of Cadarache in France

The process of selecting a location for ITER was long and drawn out. Japan proposed a site in Rokkasho. Two European sites were considered, the Cadarache site in France and the Vandellòs site in Spain, but the European Competitiveness Council named Cadarache as its official candidate in November 2003. Additionally, Canada announced a bid for the site in Clarington in May 2001, but withdrew from the race in 2003.

From this point on, the choice was between France and Japan. On 3 May 2005, the EU and Japan agreed to a process which would settle their dispute by July. At the final meeting in Moscow on 28 June 2005, the participating parties agreed to construct ITER at Cadarache with Japan receiving a privileged partnership that included a Japanese director-general for the project and a financial package to construct facilities in Japan.

Fusion for Energy, the EU agency in charge of the European contribution to the project, is located in Barcelona, Spain. Fusion for Energy (F4E) is the European Union's Joint Undertaking for ITER and the Development of Fusion Energy. According to the agency's website:

F4E is responsible for providing Europe's contribution to ITER, the world's largest scientific partnership that aims to demonstrate fusion as a viable and sustainable source of energy. [...] F4E also supports fusion research and development initiatives [...]

The ITER Neutral Beam Test Facility aimed at developing and optimizing the neutral beam injector prototype, is being constructed in Padua, Italy. It will be the only ITER facility out of the site in Cadarache.

Most of the buildings at ITER will or have been clad in an alternating pattern of reflective stainless steel and grey lacquered metal. This was done for aesthetic reasons to blend the buildings with their surrounding environment and to aid with thermal insulation.

== Participants ==
Seven members participate in the ITER project

Currently there are seven signatories to the ITER Agreement: China, the European Union, India, Japan, Russia, South Korea and the United States.

As a consequence of Brexit, the United Kingdom formally withdrew from Euratom on 31 January 2020. However, under the terms of the EU–UK Trade and Cooperation Agreement, the U.K. initially remained a member of ITER as a part of Fusion for Energy following the end of the transition period on 31 December 2020. However, in 2023, the U.K. discontinued its participation in Fusion for Energy, and in 2024 decided not to seek membership in ITER independently of the EU.

In March 2009, Switzerland, an associate member of Euratom since 1979, also ratified the country's accession to the Fusion for Energy as a third country member.

In 2016, ITER announced a partnership with Australia for "technical cooperation in areas of mutual benefit and interest", but without Australia becoming a full member. The following year, ITER signed a Cooperation Agreement with Kazakhstan.

Thailand also has an official role in the project after a cooperation agreement was signed between the ITER and the Thailand Institute of Nuclear Technology in 2018. The agreement provides courses and lectures to students and scientists in Thailand and facilitates relationships between Thailand and the ITER project.

Canada was previously a full member but pulled out due to a lack of funding from the federal government; this also resulted in Canada withdrawing its bid to host the ITER site in 2003. Canada rejoined the project in 2020 via a cooperation agreement that focused on tritium and tritium-related equipment.

ITER's work is supervised by the ITER Council, which has the authority to appoint senior staff, amend regulations, decide on budgeting issues, and allow additional states or organizations to participate in ITER. The current Chairman of the ITER Council is Won Namkung, and the acting ITER Director-General is Eisuke Tada.

=== Members ===
- European Union
  - Switzerland (as a member of Euratom and Fusion for Energy)
  - United Kingdom (as a part of Fusion for Energy)
- China
- India
- Japan
- Russia
- South Korea
- United States

=== Non-members ===
- Australia (through the Australian Nuclear Science and Technology Organisation (ANSTO) in 2016)
- Canada (through the Government of Canada in 2020, mostly on the grounds of tritium)
- Kazakhstan (through the National Nuclear Center of the Republic of Kazakhstan (NNC-RK) in 2017)
- Thailand (through the Thailand Institute of Nuclear Technology (TINT) in 2018)

== Domestic agencies ==
Each member of the ITER project—the European Union, China, India, Japan, Korea, Russia, and the United States—has created a domestic agency to meet its contributions and procurement responsibilities. These agencies employ their own staff, have their own budget, and directly oversee all industrial contracts and subcontracting.

=== ITER EU ===
The ITER Agreement was signed by Euratom representing the EU. Fusion for Energy, often referred to as F4E, was created in 2007 as the EU's domestic agency, with headquarters in Barcelona, Spain, and further offices in Cadarache, France, Garching, Germany, and Rokkasho, Japan. F4E is responsible for contributing to the design and manufacture of components such as the vacuum vessel, the divertor, and the magnets.

=== ITER China ===
China's contribution to ITER is managed through the China International Nuclear Fusion Energy Program or the CNDA. The Chinese agency is working on components such as the correction coil, magnet supports, the first wall, and shield blanket. China is also running experiments on their HL-2M tokamak in Chengdu and HT-7U (EAST) in Hefei to help support ITER research.

=== ITER India ===
ITER-India is a special project run by India's Institute for Plasma Research. ITER-India's research facility is based in Ahmedabad in Gujarat state. India's deliverables to the ITER project include the cryostat, cryolines, in-vessel shielding, cooling and cooling water systems.

=== ITER Japan ===
Japan's National Institutes for Quantum and Radiological Sciences and Technology, or QST, is now the designated Japanese domestic agency for the ITER project. The organization is based in Chiba, Japan. Japan collaborates with the ITER Organization and ITER members to help design and produce components for the tokamak, including the blanket remote handling system, the central solenoid coils, the plasma diagnostics systems, and the neutral beam injection heating systems.

=== ITER Korea ===
ITER Korea was established in 2007 under Korea's National Fusion Research Institute and the organization is based in Daejeon, South Korea. Among the procurement items that ITER Korea is responsible for four sectors of the vacuum vessel, the blanket shield block, thermal shields, and the tritium storage and delivery system.

=== ITER Russia ===
The Russian Federation occupies one of the key positions in the ITER Project. The country's contribution centers on the manufacture and supply of high-tech equipment and basic reactor systems under the aegis of Rosatom or the State Atomic Energy Corporation. The Russian Federation has multiple obligations to the ITER project, including supplying 22 kilometers of conductors based on 90 tonnes of superconducting Nb_{3}Sn strands for winding coils of a toroidal field and 11 km of conductors based on 40 tonnes of superconducting NbTi strands for windings of coils of a poloidal field of the ITER magnetic system, sent in late 2022. Russia is responsible for the manufacture of 179 of the most energy-intensive (up to 5 MW/m^{2}) panels of the First Wall. The panels are covered with beryllium plates soldered to CuCrZr bronze, which is connected to a steel base. Panel size up to 2 m wide, 1.4 m high; its mass is about 1000 kg. The obligation of the Russian Federation also includes conducting thermal tests of ITER components that are facing the plasma. Russia's participation in the project has given it full design documentation for the ITER reactor.

=== ITER US ===
US ITER is part of the US Department of Energy and is managed by the Oak Ridge National Laboratory in Tennessee. US ITER is responsible for both the design and manufacturing of components for the ITER project, and American involvement includes contributions to the tokamak cooling system, the diagnostics systems, the electron and ion cyclotron heating transmission lines, the toroidal and central solenoid magnet systems, and the pellet injection systems. In 2022, the US fusion research community released its plan for a US ITER Research Program covering key research areas such as plasma-material interactions, plasma diagnostics, and fusion nuclear science and technology. The plan envisions close collaboration between the US and other ITER partners to ensure the successful operation of ITER.

== Funding ==
In 2006, the ITER Agreement was signed on the basis of an estimated cost of €5.9 billion over a ten-year period. In 2008, as a result of a design review, the estimate was revised upwards to about €19 billion. As of 2016, the total cost of constructing and operating the experiment is expected to be over €22 billion, an increase of €4.6 billion of its 2010 estimate, and of €9.6 billion from the 2009 estimate.

At the June 2005 conference in Moscow, the participating members of the ITER cooperation agreed on the following division of funding contributions for the construction phase: 45.4% by the hosting member, the European Union, and the rest split between the non-hosting members at a rate of 9.1% each for China, India, Japan, South Korea, the Russian Federation and the US. During the operation and deactivation phases, Euratom will contribute to 34% of the total costs; Japan and the United States 13%; and China, India, Korea, and Russia 10%.

Ninety percent of contributions will be delivered 'in-kind' using ITER's own currency, the ITER Units of Account (IUAs). Though Japan's financial contribution as a non-hosting member is one-eleventh of the total, the EU agreed to grant it a special status so that Japan will provide for two-elevenths of the research staff at Cadarache and be awarded two-elevenths of the construction contracts, while the European Union's staff and construction components contributions will be cut from five-elevenths to four-elevenths.

The American contribution to ITER has been subject to debate. The U.S. Department of Energy (USDOE) has estimated the total construction costs to 2025, including in-kind contributions, to be $65 billion, though ITER disputes this calculation. After having reduced funding to ITER in 2017, the United States ended up doubling its initial budget to $122 million in-kind contribution in 2018. It is estimated the total contribution to ITER for the year 2020 was $247 million, an amount that is part of the USDOE's Fusion Energy Sciences program. Under a strategic plan to guide American fusion energy efforts that was approved in January 2021, the USDOE directed the Fusion Energy Sciences Advisory Committee to assume that the US will continue to fund ITER for a ten-year period.

Support for the European budget for ITER has also varied over the course of the project. It was reported in December 2010 that the European Parliament had refused to approve a plan by member states to reallocate €1.4 billion from the budget to cover a shortfall in ITER building costs in 2012–13. The closure of the 2010 budget required this financing plan to be revised, and the European Commission (EC) was forced to put forward an ITER budgetary resolution proposal in 2011. In the end, the European contribution to ITER for the 2014 to 2020 period was set at €2.9 billion. Most recently, in February 2021, the European Council approved ITER financing of €5.61 billion for the period of 2021 to 2027.

== Manufacturing ==
The construction of the ITER tokamak has been compared to the assembly of "a giant three-dimensional puzzle" because the parts are manufactured around the world and then shipped to France for assembly. This assembly system is the result of the ITER Agreement that stipulates that member contributions were to be mostly "in-kind" with countries manufacturing components instead of providing money. This system was devised to provide economic stimulus and fusion expertise in the countries funding the project and the general framework called for 90% of member contributions to be in material or components and 10% to be in money.

As a result, more than 2800 design or manufacturing contracts have been signed since the launch of the project. According to a 2017 estimate from French Minister for Research, Education and Innovation, Frédérique Vidal, there were 500 companies involved in the construction of ITER and Bernard Bigot stated that €7 billion in contracts had been awarded to prime contractors in Europe alone since 2007.

The overall assembly of the tokamak facility is being overseen through a €174-million contract awarded to Momentum, a joint venture between Amec Foster Wheeler (Britain), Assystem (France), and Kepco (South Korea). One of the largest tenders was a €530-million contract for HVAC systems and mechanical and electrical equipment that was awarded to a European consortium involving ENGIE (France) and Exyte (Germany). A tokamak assembly contract worth €200 million also went to a European consortium, Dynamic, that includes the companies Ansaldo Energia (Italy), ENGIE (France), and SIMIC (Italy). The French industrial conglomerate Daher was awarded more than €100 million in logistics contracts for ITER, which includes the shipment of the heavy components from the different manufacturers around the world.

In America, US ITER has awarded $1.3 billion in contracts to American companies since the beginning of the project and there is an estimated $800 million in future contracts still to come. The major US contracts include General Atomics being selected to design and manufacture the crucial central solenoid magnet.

In 2019, the Chinese consortium led by China Nuclear Power Engineering Corporation signed a contract for machine assembly at ITER that was the biggest nuclear energy contract ever signed by a Chinese company in Europe.

Russia is supplying magnet and vacuum-injection systems for ITER with construction being done at the Sredne-Nevsky Shipyard in Saint Petersburg.

In India, the contract for construction of the cryostat, one of the fundamental pieces of the tokamak, was awarded to Larsen & Toubro, who also have ITER contracts for water cooling systems. InoxCVA, an Inox Group company will supply cryolines for the ITER Project.

Two of Japan's industrial leaders, Toshiba Energy Systems & Solutions and Mitsubishi Heavy Industries, have contracts to manufacture the toroidal field coils for ITER. Construction of another key part of the tokamak, the vacuum vessel, was awarded to Hyundai Heavy Industries and is being built in Korea.

Delays were acknowledged in 2023, which would impact the target to create plasma by 2025; it was hoped the 2035 full-fusion target could be maintained. A new schedule was issued in July 2024, targeting first plasma in the mid-2030s and the start of deuterium-tritium operations by 2039.

== Criticism ==
The ITER project has been criticized for issues such as its possible environmental impacts, its usefulness as a response to climate change, the design of its tokamak, and how the experiment's objectives have been expressed.

When France was announced as the site of the ITER project in 2005, several European environmentalists stated their opposition to the project. For example, the French politician Noël Mamère argued that the fight against global warming would be neglected as a result of ITER: "This is not good news for the fight against the greenhouse effect because we're going to put ten billion euros towards a project that has a term of 30–50 years when we're not even sure it will be effective." However, another French environmental association, Association des Ecologistes Pour le Nucléaire (AEPN), welcomed the ITER project as an important part of the response to climate change.

Within the broader fusion sector, a number of researchers working on non-tokamak systems, such as the independent fusion scientist Eric Lerner, have argued that other fusion projects would be a fraction of ITER's cost and could be a potentially more viable and/or more cost-effective path to fusion power. Other critics, such as Daniel Jassby, accuse ITER researchers of being unwilling to face up to the technical and economic potential problems posed by tokamak fusion schemes.

In terms of the design of the tokamak, one concern arose from the 2013 tokamak parameters database interpolation that revealed the power load on a tokamak divertor would be five times the previously expected value. Given that the projected power load on the ITER divertor will already be very high, these new findings led to new design testing initiatives.

Another issue that critics raised regarding ITER and future deuterium-tritium (DT) fusion projects is the available supply of tritium. As it stands, ITER will use all existing supplies of tritium for its experiment and the current state-of-the-art technology isn't sufficient to generate enough tritium to fulfill the needs of future DT fuel cycle experiments for fusion energy. According to the conclusion of a 2020 study that analyzed the tritium issue, "successful development of the DT fuel cycle for DEMO and future fusion reactors requires an intensive R&D program in key areas of plasma physics and fusion technologies."

=== Responses to criticism ===
Proponents believe that much of the ITER criticism is misleading and inaccurate, in particular the allegations of the experiment's "inherent danger". The stated goals for a commercial fusion power station design are that the amount of radioactive waste produced should be hundreds of times less than that of a fission reactor, and that it should produce no long-lived radioactive waste, and that it is impossible for any such reactor to undergo a large-scale runaway chain reaction. A direct contact of the plasma with ITER inner walls would contaminate it, causing it to cool immediately and stop the fusion process. In addition, the amount of fuel contained in a fusion reactor chamber (one half gram of deuterium/tritium fuel) is only sufficient to sustain the fusion burn pulse from minutes up to an hour at most, whereas a fission reactor usually contains several years' worth of fuel. Moreover, some detritiation systems will be implemented, so that, at a fuel cycle inventory level of about 2 kg (4.4 lb), ITER will eventually need to recycle large amounts of tritium and at turnovers orders of magnitude higher than any preceding tritium facility worldwide.

In the case of an accident (or sabotage), it is expected that a fusion reactor would release far less radioactive pollution than would an ordinary fission nuclear station. Furthermore, ITER's type of fusion power has little in common with nuclear weapons technology, and does not produce the fissile materials necessary for the construction of a weapon. Proponents note that large-scale fusion power would be able to produce reliable electricity on demand, and with virtually zero pollution (no gaseous CO_{2}, SO_{2}, or NO_{x} by-products are produced).

According to researchers at a demonstration reactor in Japan, a fusion generator should be feasible in the 2030s and no later than the 2050s. Japan is pursuing its own research program with several operational facilities that are exploring several fusion paths.

In the United States alone, electricity accounts for US$210 billion in annual sales. Asia's electricity sector attracted US$93 billion in private investment between 1990 and 1999. These figures take into account only current prices. Proponents of ITER contend that an investment in research now should be viewed as an attempt to earn a far greater future return and a 2017–18 study of the impact of ITER investments on the EU economy have concluded that 'in the medium and long-term, there is likely to be a positive return on investment from the EU commitment to ITER.' Also, worldwide investment of less than US$1 billion per year into ITER is not incompatible with concurrent research into other methods of power generation, which in 2007 totaled US$16.9 billion.

Supporters of ITER emphasize that the only way to test ideas for withstanding the intense neutron flux is to subject materials experimentally to that flux, which is one of the primary missions of ITER and the IFMIF, and both facilities will be vitally important to that effort. The purpose of ITER is to explore the scientific and engineering questions that surround potential fusion power stations. It is nearly impossible to acquire satisfactory data for the properties of materials expected to be subject to an intense neutron flux, and burning plasmas are expected to have quite different properties from externally heated plasmas. Supporters contend that the answer to these questions requires the ITER experiment, especially in the light of the monumental potential benefits.

Furthermore, the main line of research via tokamaks has been developed to the point that it is now possible to undertake the penultimate step in magnetic confinement plasma physics research with a self-sustained reaction. In the tokamak research program, recent advances devoted to controlling the configuration of the plasma have led to the achievement of substantially improved energy and pressure confinement, which reduces the projected cost of electricity from such reactors by a factor of two to a value only about 50% more than the projected cost of electricity from advanced light-water reactors. In addition, progress in the development of advanced, low activation structural materials supports the promise of environmentally benign fusion reactors and research into alternate confinement concepts is yielding the promise of future improvements in confinement. Finally, supporters contend that other potential replacements to the fossil fuels have environmental issues of their own. Solar, wind, and hydroelectric power all have very low surface power density compared to ITER's successor DEMO which, at 2,000 MW, would have an energy density that exceeds even large fission power stations.

Safety of the project is regulated according to French and EU nuclear power regulations. In 2011, the French Nuclear Safety Authority (ASN) delivered a favorable opinion, and then, based on the French Act on Nuclear Transparency and Safety, the licensing application was subject to public enquiry that allowed the general public to submit requests for information regarding safety of the project. According to published safety assessments (approved by the ASN), in the worst case of reactor leak, released radioactivity will not exceed 1/1000 of natural background radiation and no evacuation of local residents will be required. The whole installation includes a number of stress tests to confirm efficiency of all barriers. The whole reactor building is built on top of almost 500 seismic suspension columns and the whole complex is located almost 300 m above sea level. Overall, extremely rare events such as 100-year flood of the nearby Durance river and 10,000-year earthquakes were assumed in the safety design of the complex and respective safeguards are part of the design.

Between 2008 and 2017, the project has generated 34,000 job-years in the EU economy alone. It is estimated that in the 2018–2030 period, it will generate a further 74,000 job-years and €15.9 billion in gross value.

== Similar projects ==
Precursors to ITER were JET, Tore Supra, MAST, SST-1, EAST, and KSTAR. Other planned and proposed fusion reactors include NIF, W7X, T-15MD, STEP, SPARC, SST-2, CFETR, DEMO, K-DEMO and other 'DEMO-phase' national or private-sector fusion power plants.

== See also ==
- DEMOnstration Power Plant, generic term for a future class of fusion reactors that produce useful power
- Experimental Advanced Superconducting Tokamak (EAST), China's ongoing effort at Hefei Institutes
- List of plasma physics software
- Wendelstein 7-X, an advanced stellarator of Max Planck IPP in Germany for evaluating components of future fusion power plants
