= Marine isotope stages =

Ancient warm and cool periods

5-million-year history, representing the Lisiecki and Raymo (2005) LR04 Benthic Stack

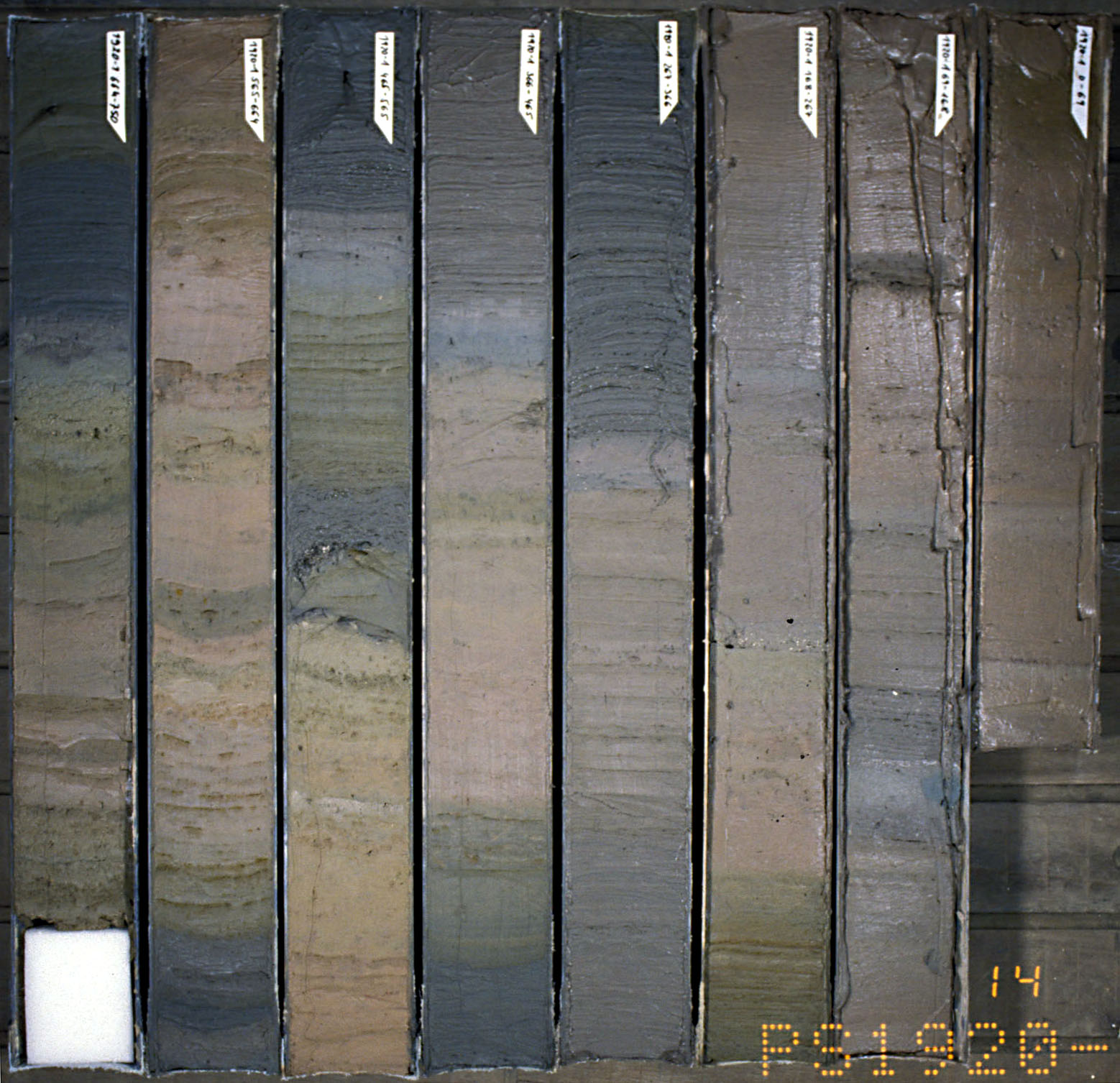
Sections of sedimentary cores from off Greenland

Marine isotope stages (MIS), marine oxygen-isotope stages, or oxygen isotope stages (OIS), are alternating warm and cool periods in the Earth's paleoclimate, deduced from oxygen isotope data derived from deep sea core samples. Working backwards from the present, which is MIS 1 in the scale, stages with even numbers have high levels of oxygen-18 and represent cold glacial periods, while the odd-numbered stages are lows in the oxygen-18 figures, representing warm interglacial intervals. The data are derived from pollen and foraminifera (plankton) remains in drilled marine sediment cores, sapropels, and other data that reflect historic climate; these are called proxies.

The MIS timescale was developed from the pioneering work of Cesare Emiliani in the 1950s, modifying an earlier system introduced by oceanographer Gustaf Arrhenius. It is now widely used in archaeology and other fields to express dating in the Quaternary period (the last 2.6 million years), as well as providing the fullest and best data for that period for paleoclimatology or the study of the early climate of the Earth, representing "the standard to which we correlate other Quaternary climate records". Emiliani's work in turn depended on Harold Urey's prediction in a paper of 1947 that the ratio between oxygen-18 and oxygen-16 isotopes in calcite, the main chemical component of the shells and other hard parts of a wide range of marine organisms, should vary depending on the prevailing water temperature in which the calcite was formed.

Over 100 stages have been identified, currently going back some 6 million years, and the scale may eventually reach back as far as 15 million years. Some stages, in particular MIS 5, are divided into sub-stages, such as "MIS 5a", with 5 a, c, and e being warm and b and d cold. A numeric system for referring to "horizons" (events rather than periods) may also be used, with for example MIS 5.5 representing the peak point of MIS 5e, and 5.51, 5.52 etc. representing the peaks and troughs of the record at a still more detailed level. For more recent periods, increasingly precise resolution of timing continues to be developed.

== Developing a timescale ==
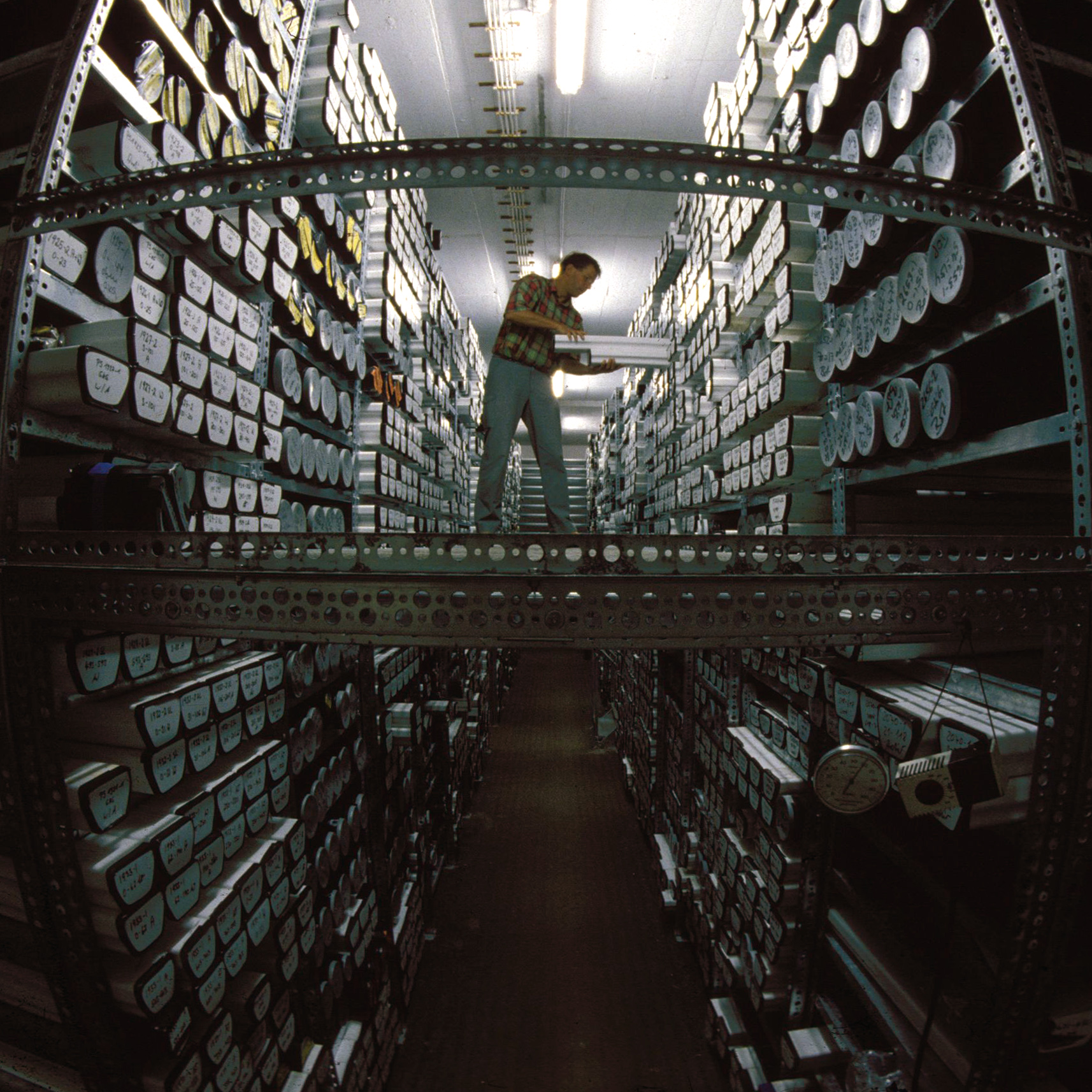
A store of core samples

In 1957 Emiliani moved to the University of Miami to have access to core-drilling ships and equipment, and began to drill in the Caribbean and collect core data. A further important advance came in 1967, when Nicholas Shackleton suggested that the fluctuations over time in the marine isotope ratios that had become evident by then were caused not so much by changes in water temperature, as Emiliani thought, but mainly by changes in the volume of ice-sheets, which when they expanded took up the lighter oxygen-16 isotope in preference to the heavier oxygen-18. The cycles in the isotope ratio were found to correspond to terrestrial evidence of glacials and interglacials. A graph of the entire series of stages then revealed unsuspected advances and retreats of ice and also filled in the details of the stadials and interstadials.

More recent ice core samples of today's glacial ice substantiated the cycles through studies of ancient pollen deposition. Currently a number of methods are making additional detail possible. Matching the stages to named periods proceeds as new dates are discovered and new regions are explored geologically. The marine isotopic records appear more complete and detailed than any terrestrial equivalents, and have enabled a timeline of glaciation for the Plio-Pleistocene to be identified. It is now believed that changes in the size of the major ice sheets such as the historical Laurentide Ice Sheet of North America are the main factor governing variations in the oxygen isotope ratios.

The MIS data also matches the astronomical data of Milankovitch cycles of orbital forcing or the effects of variations in insolation caused by cyclical slight changes in the tilt of the Earth's axis of rotation – the "orbital theory". Indeed, that the MIS data matched Milankovich's theory, which he formed during World War I, so well was a key factor in the theory gaining general acceptance, despite some remaining problems at certain points, notably the so-called 100,000-year problem. For relatively recent periods data from radiocarbon dating and dendrochronology also support the MIS data. The sediments also acquire depositional remanent magnetization which allows them to be correlated with earth's geomagnetic reversals. For older core samples, individual annual depositions cannot usually be distinguished, and dating is taken from the geomagnetic information in the cores. Other information, especially as to the ratios of gases such as carbon dioxide in the atmosphere, is provided by analysis of ice cores.

The SPECMAP Project, funded by the US National Science Foundation, has produced one standard chronology for oxygen isotope records, although there are others. This high resolution chronology was derived from several isotopic records, the composite curve was then smoothed, filtered and tuned to the known cycles of the astronomical variables. The use of a number of isotopic profiles was designed to eliminate 'noise' errors, that could have been contained within a single isotopic record. Another large research project funded by the US government in the 1970s and 1980s was Climate: Long range Investigation, Mapping, and Prediction (CLIMAP), which to a large degree succeeded in its aim of producing a map of the global climate at the Last Glacial Maximum, some 18,000 years ago, with some of the research also directed at the climate some 120,000 years ago, during the last interglacial. The theoretical advances and greatly improved data available by the 1970s enabled a "grand synthesis" to be made, best known from the 1976 paper Variations in the earth’s orbit: pacemaker of the ice ages (in Science), by J.D. Hays, Shackleton and John Imbrie, which is still widely accepted, and covers the MIS timescale and the causal effect of the orbital theory.

In 2010 the Subcommission on Quaternary Stratigraphy of the International Commission on Stratigraphy dropped other lists of MIS dates and started using the Lisiecki & Raymo (2005) LR04 Benthic Stack, as updated. This was compiled by Lorraine Lisiecki and Maureen Raymo.

== Stages ==
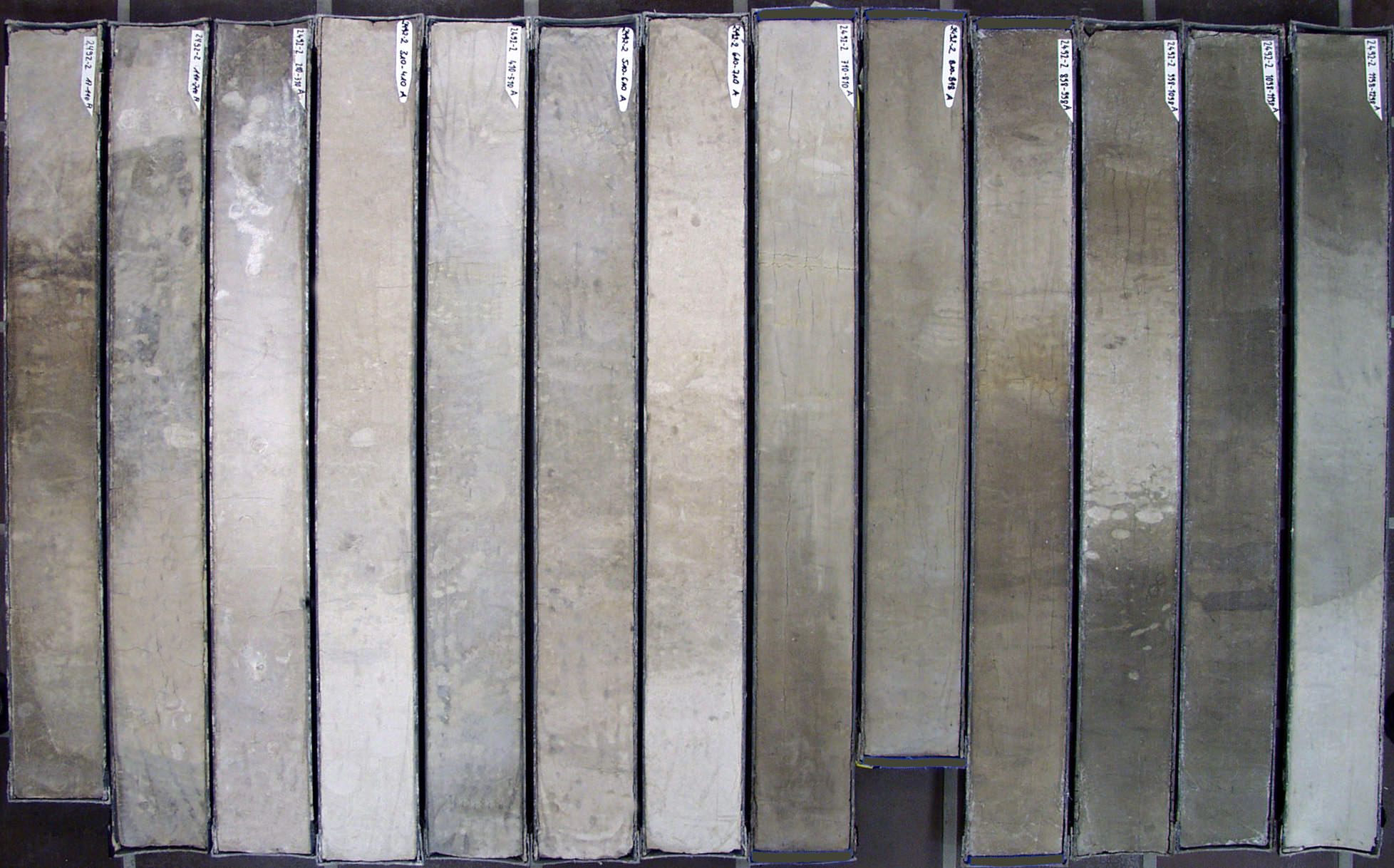
Marine core sections from the South Atlantic, about a million years old

The following are the start dates (apart from MIS 5 sub-stages) of the most recent MIS (Lisiecki & Raymo 2005, LR04 Benthic Stack). The figures, in thousands of years ago, are from Lisiecki's website. Numbers for substages in MIS 5 denote peaks of substages rather than boundaries.

MIS Start date

- MIS 1 – 14 kya, end of the Younger Dryas marks the start of the Holocene. The LR04 date of 14 kya had to accommodate less well studied time intervals, and the generally accepted date of 11.7 kya is to be preferred.
- MIS 2 – 29 (Last Glacial Maximum)
- MIS 3 – 57 (Note: Pettitt and White date MIS 3 as 59,000 to 24,000 BP. They say: "In the terrestrial record, five non forested MIS3 interstadials have been identified from Dutch and German organic deposits, from oldest to youngest the Oerel, Glinde, Moershoofd/Moershoofd Complex, Hengelo (c. 39,000 – c. 36,000 years BP) and Denekamp (c. 32,000 – c. 28,000 years BP) interstadials. In Britain only one interstadial has been identified (as of 2012), the Upton-Warren (c. 44,000 – c. 42,000 years BP).) (MIS 5d - MIS 2 is called the Last Glacial Period, Wisconsinan glaciation in North America, Weichselian glaciation in northern Europe)
- MIS 4 – 71
- MIS 5 – 130, usually sub-divided into a to e:
  - MIS 5a – 82 (peak of interglacial sub-stage)
  - MIS 5b – 87 (peak of glacial sub-stage)
  - MIS 5c – 96 (peak of interglacial sub-stage)
  - MIS 5d – 109 (peak of glacial sub-stage)
  - MIS 5e – 123 (peak of Last Interglacial, also known as the Eemian among other names)
- MIS 6 – 191 (Penultimate Glacial Period, also called Illinoian glacial in North America, later Saalian in northern Europe and later Wolstonian in Britain)
- MIS 7 – 243 (Aveley Interglacial in Britain)
- MIS 8 – 300 (early Wolstonian in Britain)
- MIS 9 – 337 (Purfleet Interglacial in Britain)
- MIS 10 – 374
- MIS 11 – 424 (Hoxnian Interglacial in Britain, and Holstein Interglacial in Central Europe)
- MIS 12 – 478 (Anglian Glacial in Britain, Elster glaciation in northern Europe)
- MIS 13 – 524
- MIS 14 – 563
- MIS 15 – 621
- MIS 16 – 676
- MIS 17 – 712
- MIS 18 – 761
- MIS 19 – 790 (Brunhes–Matuyama reversal)
- MIS 20 – 814
- MIS 21 – 866

The list continues to MIS 104, beginning 2.614 million years ago.

== Older versions ==
The following are the start dates of the most recent MIS, in kya (thousands of years ago), in now outdated versions of the sequence. The first figures are derived by Aitken & Stokes from Bassinot et al. (1994), with the figures in parentheses alternative estimates from Martinson et al. for stage 4 and for the others the SPECMAP figures in Imbrie et al. (1984). For stages 1–16 the SPECMAP figures are within 5 kya of the figures given here. All figures up to MIS 21 are taken from Aitken & Stokes, Table 1.4, except for the sub-stages of MIS 5, which are from Wright's Table 1.1.

- MIS 1 – 11 kya, end of the Younger Dryas marks the start of the Holocene, continuing to the present
- MIS 2 – 24 near Last Glacial Maximum
- MIS 3 – 60
- MIS 4 – 71 (74)
- MIS 5 – 130, includes the Eemian; usually sub-divided into a to 5e:
  - MIS 5a – 84.74
  - MIS 5b – 92.84
  - MIS 5c – 105.92
  - MIS 5d – 115.105
  - MIS 5e – 130.115
- MIS 6 – 190
- MIS 7 – 244
- MIS 8 – 301
- MIS 9 – 334
- MIS 10 – 364
- MIS 11 427, the most similar to MIS 1.
- MIS 12 – 474
- MIS 13 – 528
- MIS 14 – 568
- MIS 15 – 621
- MIS 16 – 659
- MIS 17 – 712 (689)
- MIS 18 – 760 (726)
- MIS 19 – 787 (736)
- MIS 20 – 810 (763)
- MIS 21 – 865 (790)

Some older stages, in mya (millions of years ago):

- MIS 22 – 1.03 mya, marking the end of the Bavelian period in Europe
- MIS 62 – 1.75, end of the Tiglian
- MIS 103 – 2.588, end of the Pliocene and start of the Pleistocene, on the INQUA time scale (older definitions put this change at 1.806 mya – the MIS date is unaffected)

== See also ==
- Timeline of glaciation
- Geologic temperature record
- Paleothermometer
- Anthropocene
- Marine terrace
- Ice core
