= Marine Isotope Stage 7 =

Period in the geologic temperature record

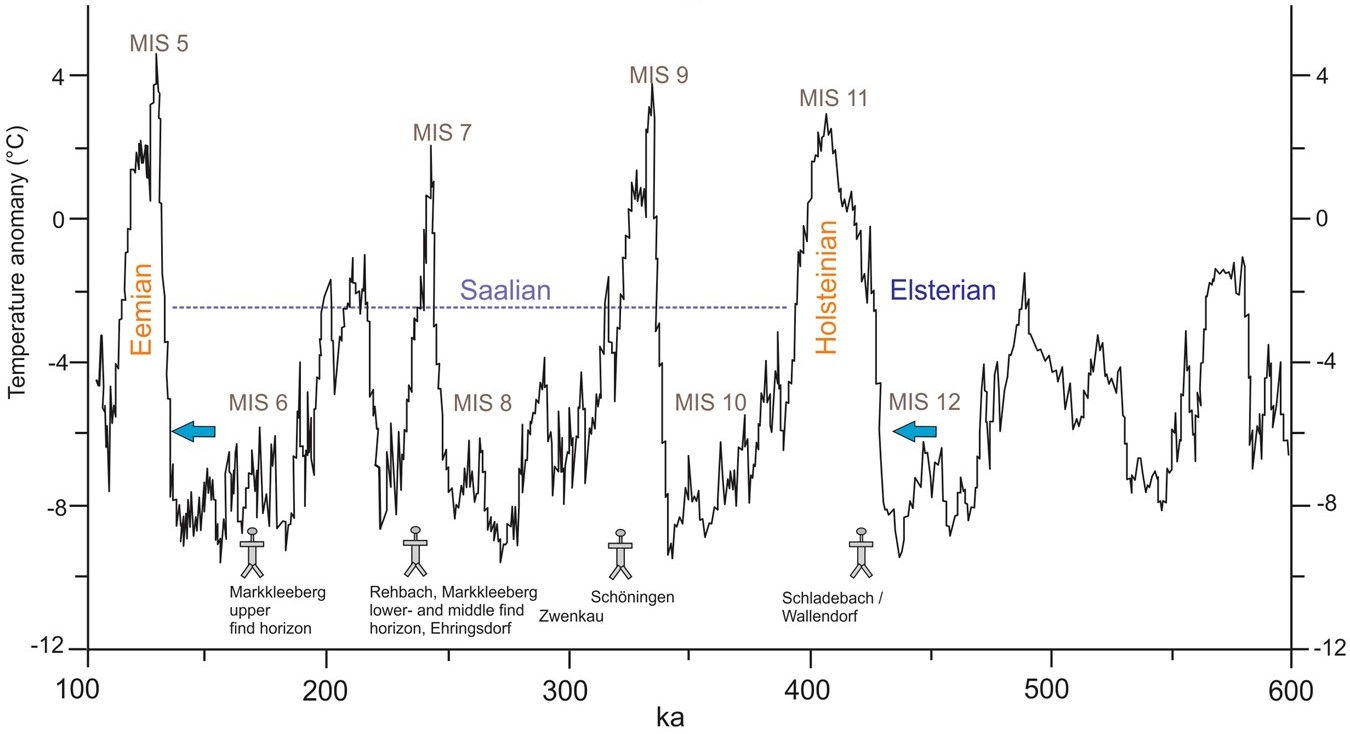
A graph of temperatures in Europe during the Middle Pleistocene epoch from around 600,000-100,000 years ago. Glacial and interglacial cycles along with notable site of human activity are labeled, including MIS 7

Marine isotope stage 7 or MIS 7 is a marine isotope stage in the geologic temperature record that occurred during the late Pleistocene epoch between 245,000 and 190,000 years ago. The stage is composed of two major warm periods, MIS 7eand MIS 7c that are preceded by warming intervals, Termination III (TIII) and TIIIa respectively, that took place on multi-millennia timescales. These were separated by MIS 7d which saw a brief return of glacial conditions.

Marine Isotope Stage 7 has so far not been subject to major scientific interest meaning that high-resolution records for the North Atlantic and Europe are available and simulations very rare.

== Climate ==
The stage was unusual compared to other interglacial periods that occurred during the late Pleistocene epoch. The stage saw pronounced regional variability in the North Atlantic while the Equatorial Pacific saw more subtle variability. MIS 7 is characterised by three periods of very low ice volume that were associated with high temperatures with both marine and continental realms. Global mean surface temperatures during MIS 7e and MIS 7c remained below pre-industrial levels at −1.4 ±0.3 °C and −1.0 ±0.3 °C respectively. MIS 7 was the coldest interglacial period following the Mid-Brunhes Event around 430,000 years ago, an interval that was characterized by an increase in the amplitude of glacial-interglacial variability, similar to MIS 7.

Climatological events that took place during the Quaternary period are generally based on orbital tuning which marine stratigraphical records are dated in reference to solar insolation at 65° North. However it seems that the beginning of some substages such as MIS 7e and MIS 7c appears to be slightly later than orbitally tuned timescales.

== History ==
The stage started during the late Pleistocene epoch around 245,000 years ago. Termination III was marked by three cold episodes. The last of these cold episodes interrupted forest development on the northwestern Iberian Peninsula, possibly related to the deglacial climatic amelioration. This begins during the middle of Termination III but maximum cold conditions occur at the beginning of low ice volume conditions. Termination III is also marked by a striking feature being the only transition period of the last 420,000 years that is incised by a warm–cold cycle similar to Termination I.

The peak of MIS 7e lasted from approximately 237,000 to 228,000 years ago. MIS 7c began around 215,000 years ago. This period likely saw the warmest phase across the entirety of MIS 7 although the global surface temperature difference compared to MIS 7e is within uncertainty values. The concentration of atmospheric Carbon dioxide were below 30 ppm lower than in MIS 7e.

The end of MIS 7 seems to have been complex with events not being particularly well defined in core samples.
