= Marine Isotope Stage 5 =

Period between 130,000 and 80,000 years ago

5 million year history, representing the Lisiecki and Raymo (2005) LR04 Benthic Stack

Marine Isotope Stage 5 or MIS 5 is a marine isotope stage in the geologic temperature record, between 130,000 and 80,000 years ago. Sub-stage MIS 5e corresponds to the Last Interglacial, also called the Eemian (in Europe) or Sangamonian (in North America), the last major interglacial period before the Holocene, which extends to the present day. Interglacial periods which occurred during the Pleistocene are investigated to better understand present and future climate variability. Thus, the present interglacial, the Holocene, is compared with MIS 5 or the interglacials of Marine Isotope Stage 11.

== Substages ==
MIS 5, is divided into substages, divided alphabetically or with a numeric system for referring to "horizons" (events rather than periods), with MIS 5.5 representing the peak point of MIS 5e, and 5.51, 5.52 etc. representing the peaks and troughs of the record at a still more detailed level.

=== Marine Isotope Stage (MIS) 5e ===
Marine Isotope Stage (MIS) 5e, called the Last Interglacial (Eemian in northern Europe, Ipswichian in Britain) around 130,000–115,000 years ago, was the last interglacial period before the present (Holocene), and compared global mean surface temperatures were at least 2 °C (3.6 °F) warmer. Mean sea level was 4–6 m (13–20 ft) higher than at present, following reductions of the Greenland ice sheet. Fossil reef proxies indicate sea level fluctuations of up to 10 m (33 ft) around the mean. Based on the data obtained from stable oxygen isotopes of planktonic foraminifera and age constraints from corals, estimates suggest average rates of sea-level rise of 1.6 m (5 ft 3 in) per century. The findings are important to understand current climate change, because global mean temperatures during MIS-5e were similar to the projected climate change today.

A 2015 study by sea level rise experts concluded that based on MIS 5e data, sea level rise could accelerate in the coming decades, with a doubling time of 10, 20 or 40 years. The study abstract explains:

We argue that ice sheets in contact with the ocean are vulnerable to non-linear disintegration in response to ocean warming, and we posit that ice sheet mass loss can be approximated by a doubling time up to sea level rise of at least several meters. Doubling times of 10, 20 or 40 years yield sea level rise of several meters in 50, 100 or 200 years. Paleoclimate data reveal that subsurface ocean warming causes ice shelf melt and ice sheet discharge. Our climate model exposes amplifying feedbacks in the Southern Ocean that slow Antarctic bottom water formation and increase ocean temperature near ice shelf grounding lines, while cooling the surface ocean and increasing sea ice cover and water column stability. Ocean surface cooling, in the North Atlantic as well as the Southern Ocean, increases tropospheric horizontal temperature gradients, eddy kinetic energy and baroclinicity, which drive more powerful storms.

A 2018 study based on cave formations in the Mediterranean Sea found sea level rise of up to 6 meters, noting "The results suggest that if the pre-industrial temperature will be surpassed by 1.5 to 2°C, sea level will respond and rise 2 to 6 meters (6.6 to 19.7 ft) above present sea level." Evidence from Bahamas and Bermuda suggest powerful storm activity at the time, strong enough for wave-transported megaboulders, lowland chevron storm ridges, and wave runup deposits.

=== Other sub-stages ===
The Eemian was followed by a sharp decline in temperature around 116,000 years ago and the warmer MIS 5c, from around 100,000 years ago, probably the period known as the Chelford Interstadial in Britain. Cooling from around 90,000 years ago was followed by the warmer MIS 5a, around 80,000 years ago, called in Britain the Brimpton Interstadial.

From MIS 5c to MIS 5a, or from about 104,000 to 82,000 years ago, the Indian Summer Monsoon (ISM) declined in overall intensity.

== See also ==
- Meltwater pulse 1A
- Paleothermometer
- Proxy (climate)
- Timeline of glaciation
