= Delta (letter) =

Fourth letter in the Greek alphabet

Delta (/ˈdɛltə/ DEL-tə; uppercase Δ, lowercase δ; Greek: δέλτα, délta, [ˈðelta]) is the fourth letter of the Greek alphabet. In the system of Greek numerals, it has a value of four. It was derived from the Phoenician letter dalet 𐤃. Letters that come from delta include the Latin D and the Cyrillic Д.

A river delta (originally, the delta of the Nile River) is named so because its shape approximates the triangular uppercase letter delta. Contrary to a popular legend, this use of the word delta was not coined by Herodotus.

== Pronunciation ==
In Ancient Greek, delta represented a voiced dental plosive IPA: [d]. In Modern Greek, it represents a voiced dental fricative IPA: [ð], like the "th" in "that", "this", or "though" (while IPA: [d] in foreign words is instead commonly transcribed as ντ, nt). Delta is romanized as d or (in Modern Greek) dh.

== Uppercase ==
The uppercase letter Δ is used to denote:

- Change of any changeable quantity, in mathematics and the sciences (in particular, the difference operator); for example, in $\frac{y_2-y_1}{x_2-x_1}=\frac{\Delta y}{\Delta x}$, the average change of y per unit x (i.e. the change of y over the change of x). Delta is the initial letter of the Greek word διαφορά, diaphorá, "difference". (The small Latin letter d is used in much the same way for the notation of derivatives and differentials, which also describe change by infinitesimal amounts.)
- The Laplace operator:
  $$\Delta f=\sum_{i=1}^n{\frac{\partial^2f}{\partial x_i^2}}$$.
- The discriminant of a polynomial equation, especially the quadratic equation:
  $$\Delta=b^2-4ac$$.
- The area of a triangle:
  $\Delta=\tfrac{1}{2}ab\sin{C}$.
- The symmetric difference of two sets.
- A macroscopic change in the value of a variable in mathematics or science.
- Uncertainty in a physical variable as seen in the uncertainty principle.
- An interval of possible values for a given quantity.
- Any of the delta particles in particle physics.
- The determinant of the matrix of coefficients of a set of linear equations (see Cramer's rule).
- That an associated locant number represents the location of a covalent bond in an organic compound, the position of which is variant between isomeric forms.
- A simplex, simplicial complex, or convex hull.
- In chemistry, the addition of heat in a reaction.
- In legal shorthand, it represents a defendant.
- In the financial markets, one of the Greeks, describes the rate of change of an option price for a given change in the underlying benchmark.
- A major seventh chord in jazz music notation.
- In genetics, it can stand for a gene deletion (e.g. the CCR5-Δ32, a 32 nucleotide/bp deletion within CCR5).
- The American Dental Association cites it (together with omicron for "odont") as the symbol of dentistry.
- The anonymous signature of James David Forbes.
- Determinacy (having a definite truth-value) in philosophical logic.
- In mathematics, the symbol ≜ (delta over equals) is occasionally used to define a new variable or function.

== Lowercase ==
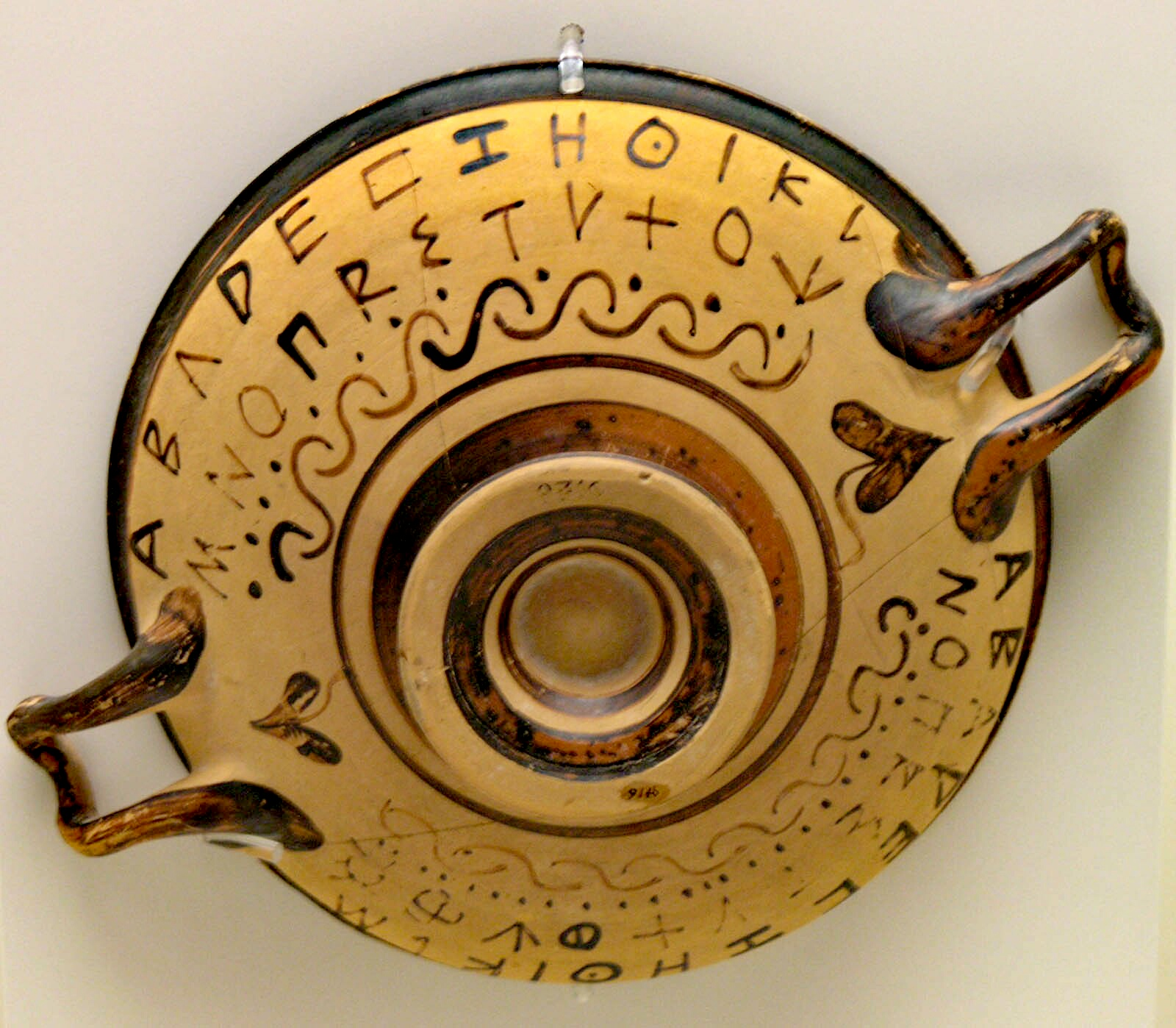
The alphabet on a black figure vessel, with a D-shaped delta.

The lowercase letter δ (or 𝛿) can be used to denote:

- A change in the value of a variable in calculus.
- A functional derivative in functional calculus.
- The (ε, δ)-definition of limits, in mathematics and more specifically in calculus.
- The Kronecker delta in mathematics.
- The central difference for a function.
- The degree of a vertex in graph theory.
- The Dirac delta function in mathematics.
- The transition function in automata.
- Deflection in engineering mechanics.
- The force of interest in actuarial science.
- The chemical shift of nuclear magnetic resonance in chemistry.
- The relative electronegativity of different atoms in a molecule, δ^{−} being more electronegative than δ^{+}.
- Text requiring deletion in proofreading; the usage is said to date back to classical times.
- In some of the manuscripts written by Dr. John Dee, the character of delta is used to represent Dee.
- A subunit of the F1 sector of the F-ATPase.
- The declination of an object in the equatorial coordinate system of astronomy.
- The dividend yield in the Black–Scholes option pricing formula.
- Ratios of environmental isotopes, such as ^{18}O/^{16}O and D/^{1}H from water are displayed using delta notation – δ^{18}O and δD, respectively.
- The rate of depreciation of the aggregate capital stock of an economy in an exogenous growth model in macroeconomics.
- In a system that exhibits electrical reactance, the angle between voltage and current.
- Partial charge in chemistry.
- The maximum birefringence of a crystal in optical mineralogy.
- An Old Irish voiced dental or alveolar fricative of uncertain articulation, the ancestor of the sound represented by Modern Irish dh.
- Silver ratio

== Unicode ==
- U+018D ƍ LATIN SMALL LETTER TURNED DELTA
- U+0394 Δ GREEK CAPITAL LETTER DELTA (&Delta;) (\Delta in TeX)
- U+03B4 δ GREEK SMALL LETTER DELTA (&delta;) (\delta in TeX)
- U+1D5F ᵟ MODIFIER LETTER SMALL DELTA
- U+1E9F ẟ LATIN SMALL LETTER DELTA
- U+2207 ∇ NABLA (&Del;, &nabla;)
- U+225C ≜ DELTA EQUAL TO (&triangleq;, &trie;)
- U+234B ⍋ APL FUNCTIONAL SYMBOL DELTA STILE
- U+234D ⍍ APL FUNCTIONAL SYMBOL QUAD DELTA
- U+2359 ⍙ APL FUNCTIONAL SYMBOL DELTA UNDERBAR
- U+2C86 Ⲇ COPTIC CAPITAL LETTER DALDA
- U+2C87 ⲇ COPTIC SMALL LETTER DALDA
- U+1D6AB 𝚫 MATHEMATICAL BOLD CAPITAL DELTA (Note: The mathematical codes should only be used in math. Stylized Greek text should be encoded using the normal Greek letters, with markup and formatting to indicate text style.)
- U+1D6C5 𝛅 MATHEMATICAL BOLD SMALL DELTA
- U+1D6E5 𝛥 MATHEMATICAL ITALIC CAPITAL DELTA
- U+1D6FF 𝛿 MATHEMATICAL ITALIC SMALL DELTA
- U+1D71F 𝜟 MATHEMATICAL BOLD ITALIC CAPITAL DELTA
- U+1D739 𝜹 MATHEMATICAL BOLD ITALIC SMALL DELTA
- U+1D759 𝝙 MATHEMATICAL SANS-SERIF BOLD CAPITAL DELTA
- U+1D773 𝝳 MATHEMATICAL SANS-SERIF BOLD SMALL DELTA
- U+1D793 𝞓 MATHEMATICAL SANS-SERIF BOLD ITALIC CAPITAL DELTA
- U+1D7AD 𝞭 MATHEMATICAL SANS-SERIF BOLD ITALIC SMALL DELTA

== See also ==
- Arrow (symbol)
- Chevron (insignia)
- ∆ (disambiguation)
- D, d
- Д, д
- ẟ – Latin delta
- ∂ – the partial derivative symbol, a curved d, sometimes mistaken for a lowercase Greek letter Delta.
- ð – the small eth appears similar to a small delta and also represents a d sound in some contexts
- Th (digraph)
- Thorn (letter)
- Greek letters used in mathematics, science, and engineering
- ∇ – Nabla symbol
- Delta Air Lines
- SARS-CoV-2 Delta variant
