= Marine Isotope Stage 9 =

Marine Isotope Stage during the lower Paleolithic

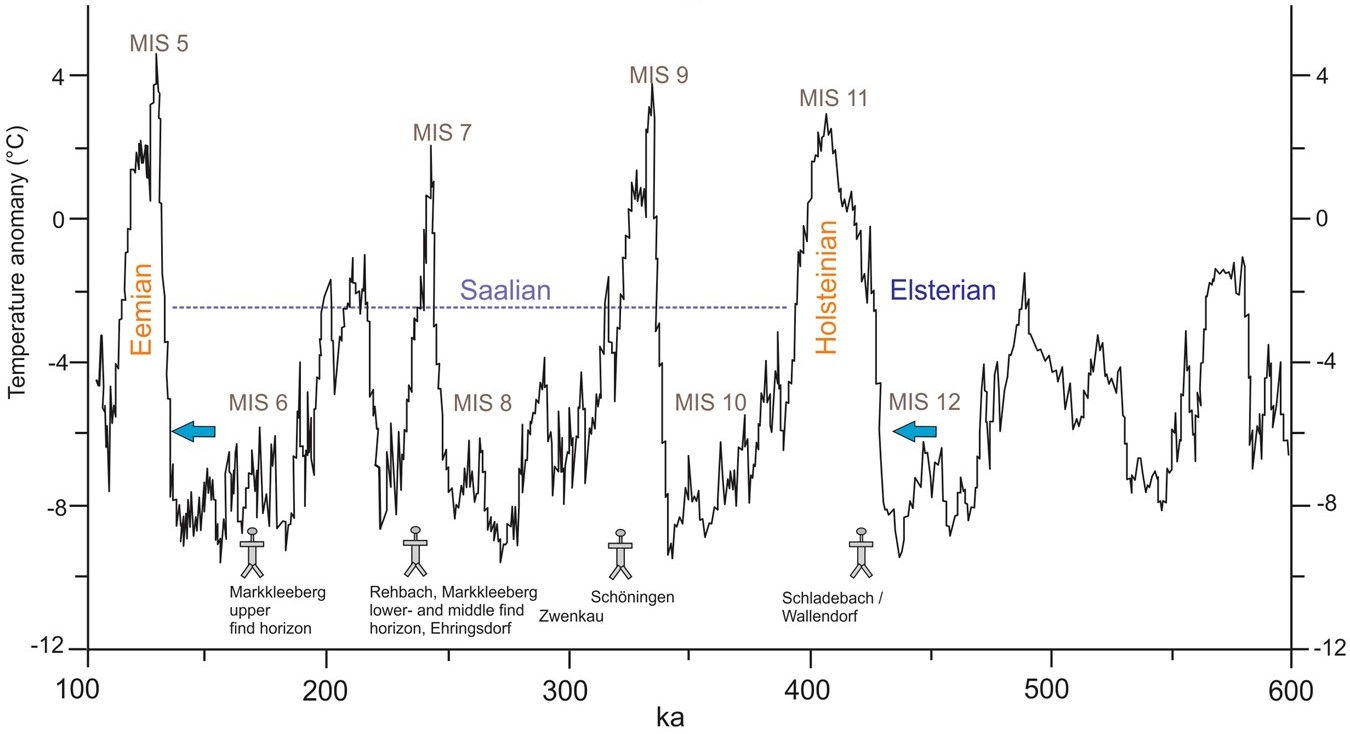
Map of glacial cycles from 600-100,000 years ago, with MIS 9 labelled

Marine Isotope Stage 9 (MIS 9) was an interglacial (warm) Marine Isotope Stage. It was the last period of the Lower Paleolithic. Estimates of its dating vary. It lasted from 337,000 to 300,000 years ago according to Lisiecki and Raymo's 2005 LR04 Benthic Stack, whereas Rawlinson et al dated it in 2022 to between 328,000 and 301,000 years ago.

Views on its division into sub-stages also vary. A 2013 study divided it into two warm interstadials (9a and 9c) and one cooler stadial (9b), whereas a 2025 study had three warm sub-stages (9a, 9c and 9e) and two which were cooler (9b and 9d).

In Great Britain, it is known as the Purfleet Interglacial.

== MIS Drivers ==
Marine Isotope Stages are glacial and interglacial periods throughout time. One of the processes that drive this major change are the Milankovitch Cycles, which control the insolation received from the Sun. The data is retrieved from deep sea core samples. The manner by which the data is obtained through core samples is mainly due to the sedimentation in the region which can be very indicative of an interglacial or glacial phases.

=== Marine Oxygen Isotopes ===
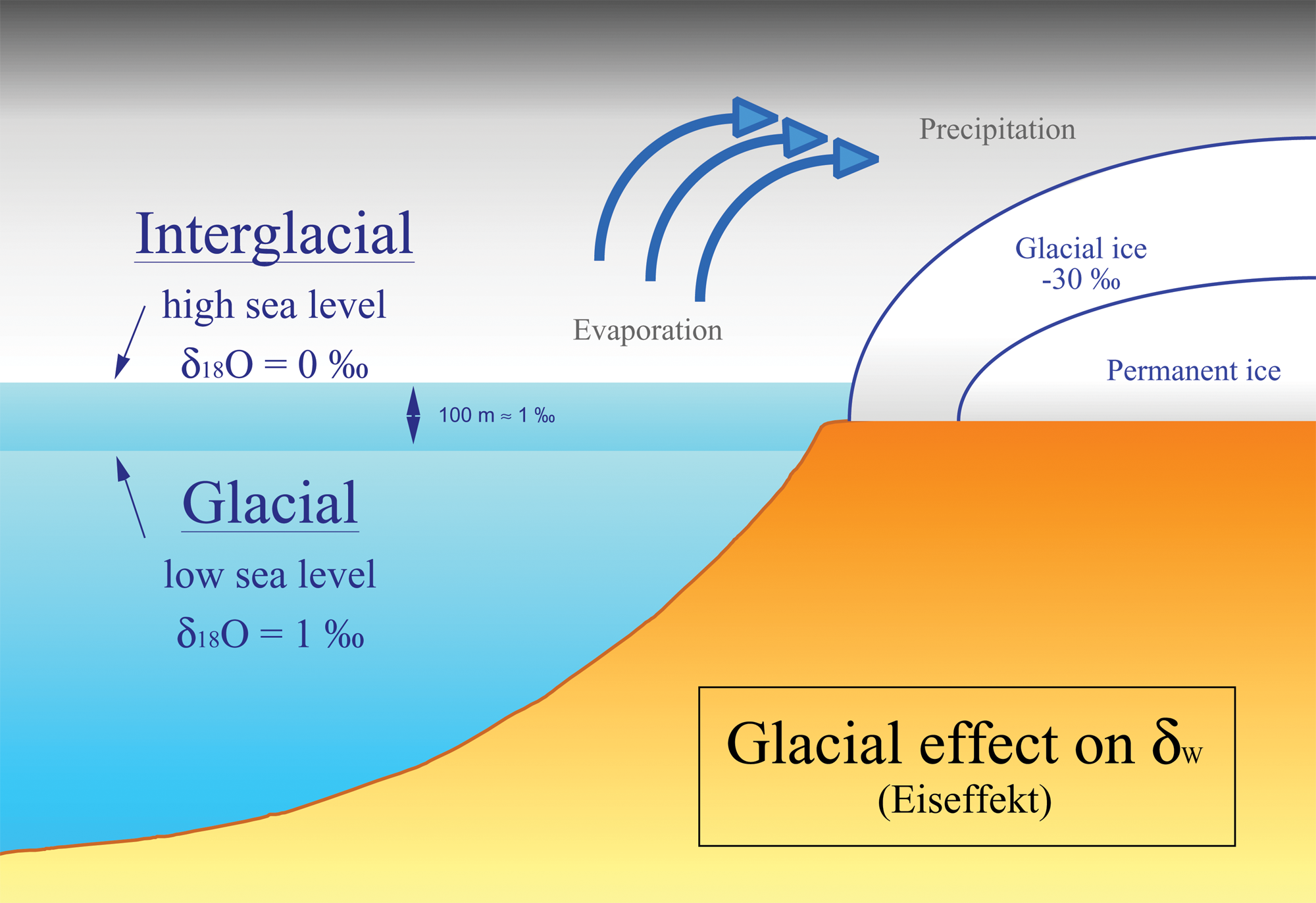
Changes in oxygen isotopes ratios during glacial and interglacial events.

MIS are obtained through oxygen isotope analysis within the core samples to understand paleoclimate changes. This includes glacial and interglacial periods. The data is retrieved from proxies, such as foraminifera and pollen that have diverse oxygen-18 to oxygen-16 ratios depending on the temperature in the ocean during said events. When the isotopic analysis results in high isotopic ratio values, it is representative of colder glacial environments, while isotopic values with low ratios are indicative of warmer temperatures.

== Interglacial Impacts on Living Organisms ==
=== European culture impacts ===
During this interglacial stage, Europe was occupied by Homo heidelbergensis, who had retreated from Britain during the preceding glacial period. Populations returned as the climate warmed and sea levels rose around 330,000 years ago. The evidence of their return is found along terraces of the Thames and former Solent rivers of Europe. Within the area, thousands of hand axes and other artefacts have been found indicating their return after the increasing warmer temperatures. In Southern England, the summers were similar to or slightly warmer than today, and the winters slightly cooler. The period saw a transition to Clactonian culture for manufacture of stone tools.
