= Global cooling (disambiguation) =

Global cooling was a 1970s conjecture about global climate change.

Global cooling may also refer to:

- Impact winter – Hypothesized climate effects due to an asteroid or comet impact on Earth
- Nuclear winter – Hypothetical climatic effect of nuclear war
- Volcanic winter – Temperature anomaly event caused by a volcanic eruption
- a long-term decline in:
  - global surface temperature
  - ocean heat content
- Climate change mitigation, means to counteract global warming
- Earth's Energy Imbalance, a measurable change in the planet's radiative equilibrium which quantifies its cooling (or heating) rate
- Generally, cooling periods in Earth's climate history, see:
  - in historical times:
    - Late Antique Little Ice Age
    - Little Ice Age, a period from the 16th to 19th centuries characterized by cooling and coincident with below average sunspots frequency
  - within the current glaciation, see stadial
    - Marine isotope stage
    - Last Glacial Maximum
    - Next Glacial Maximum
  - on a geologic time scale, see ice age
    - Snowball Earth
- Geophysical global cooling, a conjecture about the formation of natural features that was made obsolete by the theory of plate tectonics

== See also ==
- Geologic temperature record
- Paleoclimatology
- Climate change (general concept)
- Climate change denial
- Global warming
