= Environmental isotopes =

The environmental isotopes are a subset of isotopes, both stable and radioactive, which are the object of isotope geochemistry. They are primarily used as tracers to see how things move around within the ocean-atmosphere system, within terrestrial biomes, within the Earth's surface, and between these broad domains.

== Isotope geochemistry ==
Chemical elements are defined by their number of protons, but the mass of the atom is determined by the number of protons and neutrons in the nucleus. Isotopes are atoms that are of a specific element, but have different numbers of neutrons and thus different mass numbers. The ratio between isotopes of an element varies slightly in the world, so in order to study isotopic ratio changes across the world, changes in isotope ratios are defined as deviations from a standard, multiplied by 1000. This unit is a "per mil". As a convention, the ratio is of the heavier isotope to the lower isotope.

$\delta \ce{^{13}C} = \left( \frac{\left( \frac\ce{^{13}C}\ce{^{12}C} \right)_{sample}}{\left( \frac\ce{^{13}C}\ce{^{12}C} \right)_{standard}} -1 \right) \times 1000$ ‰

These variations in isotopes can occur through many types of fractionation. They are generally classified as mass independent fractionation and mass dependent fractionation. An example of a mass independent process is the fractionation of oxygen atoms in ozone. This is due to the kinetic isotope effect (KIE) and is caused by different isotope molecules reacting at different speeds. An example of a mass dependent process is the fractionation of water as it transitions from the liquid to gas phase. Water molecules with heavier isotopes (^{18}O and ^{2}H) tend to stay in the liquid phase as water molecules with lighter isotopes (^{16}O and ^{1}H) preferentially move to the gas phase.

Of the different isotopes that exist, one common classification is distinguishing radioactive isotopes from stable isotopes. Radioactive isotopes are isotopes that will decay into a different isotope. For example, ^{3}H (tritium) is a radioactive isotope of hydrogen. It decays into ^{3}He with a half-life of ~12.3 years. By comparison, stable isotopes do not undergo radioactive decay, and their fixed proportions are measured against exponentially decaying proportions of radioactive isotopes to determine the age of a substance. Radioactive isotopes are generally more useful on shorter timescales, such as investigating modern circulation of the ocean using ^{14}C, while stable isotopes are generally more useful on longer timescales, such as investigating differences in river flow with stable strontium isotopes.

These isotopes are used as tracers to study various phenomena of interest. These tracers have a certain distribution spatially, and so scientists need to deconvolve the different processes that affect these tracer distributions. One way tracer distributions are set is by conservative mixing. In conservative mixing, the amount of the tracer is conserved. An example of this is mixing two water masses with different salinities. The salt from the saltier water mass moves to the less salty water mass, keeping the total amount of salinity constant. This way of mixing tracers is very important, giving a baseline of what value of a tracer one should expect. The value of a tracer as a point is expected to be an average value of the sources that flow into that region. Deviations from this are indicative of other processes. These can be called nonconservative mixing, where there are other processes that do not conserve the amount of tracer. An example of this is 𝛿^{14}C. This mixes between water masses, but it also decays over time, reducing the amount of ^{14}C in the region.

== Commonly used isotopes ==
The most used environmental isotopes are:

- deuterium
- tritium
- carbon-13
- carbon-14
- nitrogen-15
- oxygen-18
- silicon-29
- chlorine-36
- isotopes of uranium
- isotopes of strontium

== Ocean circulation ==
One topic that environmental isotopes are used to study is the circulation of the ocean. Treating the ocean as a box is only useful in some studies; in depth consideration of the oceans in general circulation models (GCMs) requires knowing how the ocean circulates. This leads to an understanding of how the oceans (along with the atmosphere) transfer heat from the tropics to the poles. This also helps deconvolve circulation effects from other phenomena that affect certain tracers such as radioactive and biological processes.

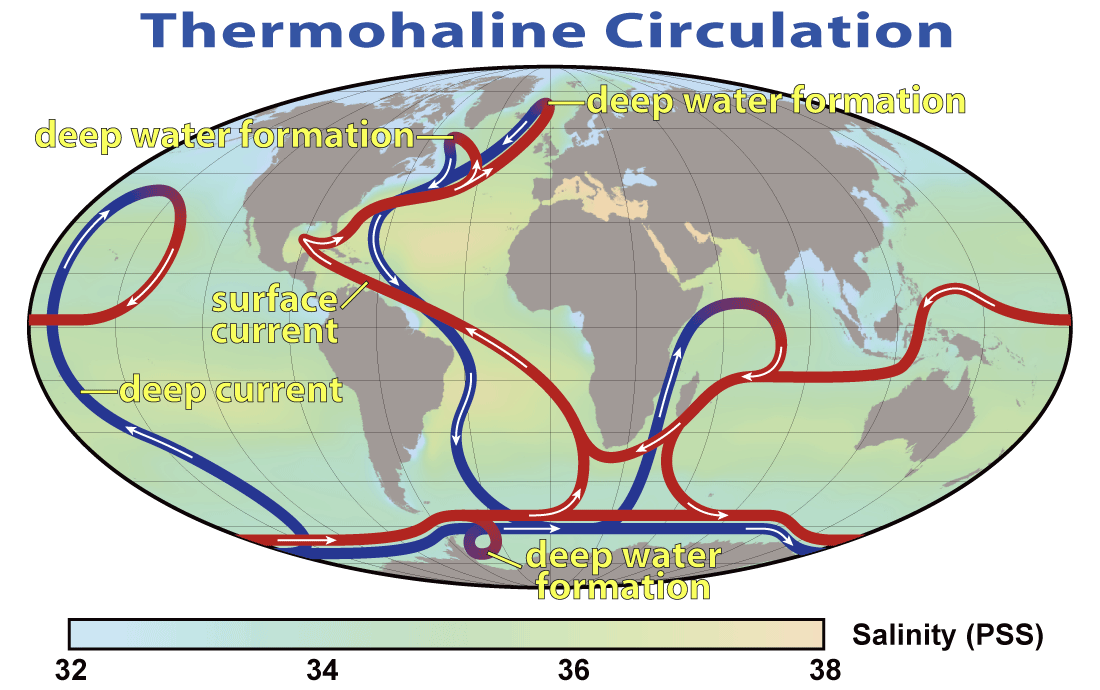
A summary of the path of the thermohaline circulation. Blue paths represent deep-water currents, while red paths represent surface currents.

Using rudimentary observation techniques, the circulation of the surface ocean can be determined. In the Atlantic basin, surface waters flow from the south towards the north in general, while also creating gyres in the northern and southern Atlantic. In the Pacific Ocean, the gyres still form, but there is comparatively very little large scale meridional (North-South) movement. For deep waters, there are two areas where density causes waters to sink into the deep ocean. These are in the North Atlantic and the Antarctic. The deep water masses formed are North Atlantic Deep Water (NADW) and Antarctic Bottom Water (AABW). Deep waters are mixtures of these two waters, and understanding how waters are composed of these two water masses can tell us about how water masses move around in the deep ocean.

This can be investigated with environmental isotopes, including ^{14}C. ^{14}C is predominantly produced in the upper atmosphere and from nuclear testing, with no major sources or sinks in the ocean. This ^{14}C from the atmosphere becomes oxidized into ^{14}CO_{2}, allowing it to enter the surface ocean through gas transfer. This is transferred into the deep ocean through NADW and AABW. In NADW, the 𝛿^{14}C is approximately -60‰, and in AABW, the 𝛿^{14}C is approximately -160‰. Thus, using conservative mixing of radiocarbon, the expected amount of radiocarbon in various locations can be determined using the percent compositions of NADW and AABW at that location. This can be determined using other tracers, such as phosphate star or salinity. Deviations from this expected value are indicative of other processes that affect the delta ratio of radiocarbon, namely radioactive decay. This deviation can be converted to a time, giving the age of the water at that location. Doing this over the world's ocean can yield a circulation pattern of the ocean and the rate at which water flow through the deep ocean. Using this circulation in conjunction with the surface circulation allows scientists to understand the energy balance of the world. Warmer surface waters flow northward while colder deep waters flow southward, leading to net heat transfer towards the pole.

== Paleoclimate ==
Isotopes are also used to study paleoclimate. This is the study of how climate was in the past, from hundreds of years ago to hundreds of thousands of years ago. The only records of these times that we have are buried in rocks, sediments, biological shells, stalagmites and stalactites, etc. The isotope ratios in these samples were affected by the temperature, salinity, circulation of the ocean, precipitation, etc. of the climate at the time, causing a measurable change from the standards for isotope measurements. This is how climate information is encoded in these geological formations. Some of the many isotopes useful for environmental science are discussed below.

=== δ^{18}O ===
One useful isotope for reconstructing past climates is oxygen-18. It is another stable isotope of oxygen along with oxygen-16, and its incorporation into water and carbon dioxide/carbonate molecules is strongly temperature dependent. Higher temperature implies more incorporation of oxygen-18, and vice versa. Thus, the ratio of ^{18}O/^{16}O can tell something about temperature. For water, the isotope ratio standard is Vienna Standard Mean Ocean Water, and for carbonates, the standard is Pee Dee Belemnite. Using ice cores and sediment cores that record information about the water and shells from past times, this ratio can tell scientists about the temperature of those times.

Climate record as reconstructed by Lisiecki and Raymo (2005) showing oscillations in the Earth's temperature over time. These oscillations have a 41 kyr cycle until about 1.2 million years ago, switching to a 100 kyr cycle that we see now.

This ratio is used with ice cores to determine the temperature at the spot in the ice core. Depth in an ice core is proportional to time, and it is "wiggle-matched" with other records to determine the true time of the ice at that depth. This can be done by comparing δ^{18}O in calcium carbonate shells in sediment cores to these records to match large scale changes in the temperature of the Earth. Once the ice cores are matched to sediment cores, highly accurate dating methods such as U-series dating can be used to accurately determine the time of these events. There are some processes that mix water from different times into the same depth in the ice core, such as firn production and sloped landscape floes.

Lisiecki and Raymo (2005) used measurements of δ^{18}O in benthic foraminifera from 57 globally distributed deep sea sediment cores, taken as a proxy for the total global mass of glacial ice sheets, to reconstruct the climate for the past five million years. This record shows oscillations of 2-10 degrees Celsius over this time. Between 5 million and 1.2 million years ago, these oscillations had a period of 41,000 years (41 kyr), but about 1.2 million years ago the period switched to 100 kyr. These changes in global temperature match with changes in orbital parameters of the Earth's orbit around the Sun. These are called Milankovitch cycles, and these are related to eccentricity, obliquity (axial tilt), and precession of Earth around its axis. These correspond to cycles with periods of 100 kyr, 40 kyr, and 20 kyr.

δ^{18}O can also be used to investigate smaller scale climate phenomena. Koutavas et al. (2006) used δ^{18}O of G. ruber foraminifera to study the El Niño–Southern Oscillation (ENSO) and its variability through the mid-Holocene. By isolating individual foram shells, Koutavas et al. were able to obtain a spread of δ^{18}O values at a specific depth. Because these forams live for approximately a month and that the individual forams were from many different months, clumped together in a small depth range in the coral, the variability of δ^{18}O was able to be determined. In the eastern Pacific, where these cores were taken, the primary driver of this variability is ENSO, making this a record of ENSO variability over the core's time span. Koutavas et al. found that ENSO was much less variable in the mid Holocene (~6,000 years ago) than it is currently.

=== Strontium isotopes ===
Another set of environmental isotopes used in paleoclimate is strontium isotopes. Strontium-86 and strontium-87 are both stable isotopes of strontium, but strontium-87 is radiogenic, coming from the decay of rubidium-87. The ratio of these two isotopes depends on the concentration of rubidium-87 initially and the age of the sample, assuming that the background concentration of strontium-87 is known. This is useful because ^{87}Rb is predominantly found in continental rocks. Particles from these rocks come into the ocean through weathering by rivers, meaning that this strontium isotope ratio is related to the weathering ion flux coming from rivers into the ocean. The background concentration in the ocean for ^{87}Sr/^{86}Sr is 0.709 ± 0.0012. Because the strontium ratio is recorded in sedimentary records, the oscillations of this ratio over time can be studied. These oscillations are related to the riverine input into the oceans or into the local basin. Richter and Turekian have done work on this, finding that over glacial-interglacial timescales (10^{5} years), the ^{87}Sr/^{86}Sr ratio varies by 3*10^{−5}.

Decay series of Actinides, including Uranium, Protactinium, Thorium, and Lead

=== Uranium and related isotopes ===
Uranium has many radioactive isotopes that continue emitting particles down a decay chain. Uranium-235 is in one such chain, and decays into protactinium-231 and then into other products. Uranium-238 is in a separate chain, decaying into a series of elements, including thorium-230. Both of these series end up forming lead, either lead-207 from uranium-235 or lead-206 from uranium-238. All of these decays are alpha or beta decays, meaning that they all follow first order rate equations of the form $dN/dt=\lambda N$, where λ is the half-life of the isotope in question. This makes it simple to determine the age of a sample based on the various ratios of radioactive isotopes that exist.

One way uranium isotopes are used is to date rocks from millions to billions of years ago. This is through uranium-lead dating. This technique uses zircon samples and measures the lead content in them. Zircon incorporates uranium and thorium atoms into its crystal structure, but strongly rejects lead. Thus, the only sources of lead in a zircon crystal are through decay of uranium and thorium. Both the uranium-235 and uranium-238 series decay into an isotope of lead. The half-life of converting ^{235}U to ^{207}Pb is 710 million years, and the half-life of converting ^{238}U to ^{206}Pb is 4.47 billion years. Because of high resolution mass-spectroscopy, both chains can be used to date rocks, giving complementary information about the rocks. The large difference in half-lives makes the technique robust over long time scales, from on the order of millions of years to on the order of billions of years.

Another way uranium isotopes are used in environmental science is the ratio of ^{231}Pa/^{230}Th. These radiogenic isotopes have different uranium parents, but have very different reactivities in the ocean. The uranium profile in the ocean is constant because uranium has a very large residence time compared to the residence time of the ocean. The decay of uranium is thus also isotropic, but the daughter isotopes react differently. Thorium is readily scavenged by particles, leading to rapid removal from the ocean into sediments. By contrast, ^{231}Pa is not as particle-reactive, feeling the circulation of the ocean in small amounts before settling into the sediment. Thus, knowing the decay rates of both isotopes and the fractions of each uranium isotopes, the expected ratio of ^{231}Pa/^{230}Th can be determined, with any deviation from this value being due to circulation. Circulation leads to a higher ^{231}Pa/^{230}Th ratio downstream and a lower ratio upstream, with the magnitude of the deviation being related to flow rate. This technique has been used to quantify the Atlantic Meridional Overturning Circulation (AMOC) during the Last Glacial Maximum (LGM) and during abrupt climate change events in Earth's past, such as Heinrich events and Dansgaard-Oeschger events.

=== Neodymium ===
Neodymium isotopes are also used to determine circulation in the ocean. All of the isotopes of neodymium are stable on the timescales of glacial-interglacial cycles, but ^{143}Nd is a daughter of ^{147}Sm, a radioactive isotope in the ocean. Samarium-147 has higher concentrations in mantle rocks vs crust rocks, so areas that receive river inputs from mantle-derived rocks have higher concentrations of ^{147}Sm and ^{143}Nd. However, these differences are so small, the standard notation of a delta value are no blunt for it; a more precise epsilon value is used to describe variations in this ratio of neodymium isotopes. It is defined as $\epsilon \ce{_{Nd}} = \left( \frac{\left( \frac\ce{^{143}Nd}\ce{^{144}Nd} \right)_{sample}}{\left( \frac\ce{^{143}Nd}\ce{^{144}Nd} \right)_{standard}} -1 \right) \times 10000$

The only major sources of this in the ocean are in the North Atlantic and in the deep Pacific Ocean. Because one of the end-members is set in the interior of the ocean, this technique has the potential to tell us complementary information about paleoclimate compared to all other ocean tracers that are only set in the surface ocean.
