= Marine Isotope Stage 13 =

Period in the geologic temperature record

5 million year history, representing the Lisiecki and Raymo (2005) LR04 Benthic Stack

Marine Isotope Stage 13 or MIS 13 is a Marine isotope stage in the geologic temperature record, in Britain covering the Cromerian interglacial period between ~524,000 and 474,000 years ago. It is split into three substages, MIS 13a MIS 13b, and MIS 13c. Some records indicate that MIS 13a was an unstable warm peak with a cold split in the middle at MIS 13.12 - separating warm MIS 13.11 and 13.13. This interglacial follows the relatively warm glacial period associated with Marine Isotope Stage 14, and is followed by the relatively cold glacial period associated with MIS 12.

== Sites ==
Britain

High Lodge, Suffolk

Waverley Wood, Warwickshire

Happisburgh 1, Norfolk

Boxgrove, West Sussex

== Ecology ==
=== Flora ===
Early domination of birch, pine, and spruce. Mixed-oak forests follow (predominantly Alder, Oak, Hornbeam, and Hazel).

=== Fauna ===
Mammals

Binomial	Common name	Direction
Erinaceus sp.	Hedgehog	?
Sorex minutus	Pygmy shrew	?
Sorex runtonensis †		?
Sorex savini †		?
Neomys sp.	Water shrew	?
Talpa europaea	Common mole	?
Talpa minor †	Pygmy mole	?
Homo sp.	Hominid	?
Lepus timidus	Mountain hare	?
Oryctolagus cuniculus	Common European rabbit	?
Plecotus auritus	Long-eared bat	?
Myotis mystacinus	Whiskered bat	?
Myotis bechsteini	Bechstein's bat	?
Scuirus sp.	Squirrel	?
Canis lupus	Wolf	?
Ursus deningeri †	Bear	?
