= Argon–argon dating =

Radiometric dating method

Argon–argon (or ^{40}Ar/^{39}Ar) dating is a radiometric dating method invented to supersede potassium–argon (K/Ar) dating in accuracy. The older method required splitting samples into two for separate potassium and argon measurements, while the newer method requires only one rock fragment or mineral grain and uses a single measurement of argon isotopes. ^{40}Ar/^{39}Ar dating relies on neutron irradiation from a nuclear reactor to convert a stable form of potassium (^{39}K) into the radioactive ^{39}Ar. As long as a standard of known age is co-irradiated with unknown samples, it is possible to use a single measurement of argon isotopes to calculate the ^{40}K/^{40}Ar* ratio, and thus to calculate the age of the unknown sample. ^{40}Ar* refers to the radiogenic ^{40}Ar, i.e. the ^{40}Ar produced from radioactive decay of ^{40}K. ^{40}Ar* does not include atmospheric argon adsorbed to the surface or inherited through diffusion and its calculated value is derived from measuring the ^{36}Ar (which is assumed to be of atmospheric origin) and assuming that ^{40}Ar is found in a constant ratio to ^{36}Ar in atmospheric gases.

== Method ==
The sample is generally crushed and single crystals of a mineral or fragments of rock are hand-selected for analysis. These are then irradiated to produce ^{39}Ar from ^{39}K via the (n-p) reaction ^{39}K(n,p)^{39}Ar. The sample is then degassed in a high-vacuum mass spectrometer via a laser or resistance furnace. Heating causes the crystal structure of the mineral (or minerals) to degrade, and, as the sample melts, trapped gases are released. The gas may include atmospheric gases, such as carbon dioxide, water, nitrogen, and radiogenic gases like argon and helium, generated from regular radioactive decay over geologic time. The abundance of ^{40}Ar* increases with the age of the sample, though the rate of increase decays exponentially with the half-life of ^{40}K, which is 1.248 billion years.

== Age equation ==
The age of a sample is given by the age equation:

$$t=\frac{1}{\lambda} \ln (J \times R+1)$$

where λ is the radioactive decay constant of ^{40}K (approximately 5.5 × 10^{−10} year^{−1}, corresponding to a half-life of approximately 1.25 billion years), J is the J-factor (parameter associated with the irradiation process), and R is the ^{40}Ar*/^{39}Ar ratio. The J factor relates to the fluence of the neutron bombardment during the irradiation process; a denser flow of neutron particles will convert more atoms of ^{39}K to ^{39}Ar than a less dense one.

== Relative dating only ==
The ^{40}Ar/^{39}Ar method only measures relative dates. In order for an age to be calculated by the ^{40}Ar/^{39}Ar technique, the J parameter must be determined by irradiating the unknown sample along with a sample of known age for a standard. Because this (primary) standard ultimately cannot be determined by ^{40}Ar/^{39}Ar, it must be first determined by another dating method. The method most commonly used to date the primary standard is the conventional K/Ar technique. An alternative method of calibrating the used standard is astronomical tuning (also known as orbital tuning), which arrives at a slightly different age.

== Applications ==
The primary use for ^{40}Ar/^{39}Ar geochronology is dating metamorphic and igneous minerals. ^{40}Ar/^{39}Ar is unlikely to provide the age of intrusions of granite as the age typically reflects the time when a mineral cooled through its closure temperature. However, in a metamorphic rock that has not exceeded its closure temperature the age likely dates the crystallization of the mineral. Dating of movement on fault systems is also possible with the ^{40}Ar/^{39}Ar method. Different minerals have different closure temperatures; biotite is ∼300°C, muscovite is about 400°C and hornblende has a closure temperature of ∼550°C. Thus, a granite containing all three minerals will record three different "ages" of emplacement as it cools down through these closure temperatures. Thus, although a crystallization age is not recorded, the information is still useful in constructing the thermal history of the rock.

Dating minerals may provide age information on a rock, but assumptions must be made. Minerals usually only record the last time they cooled down below the closure temperature, and this may not represent all of the events which the rock has undergone, and may not match the age of intrusion. Thus, discretion and interpretation of age dating is essential. ^{40}Ar/^{39}Ar geochronology assumes that a rock retains all of its ^{40}Ar after cooling past the closing temperature and that this was properly sampled during analysis.

This technique allows the errors involved in K–Ar dating to be checked. Argon–argon dating has the advantage of not requiring determinations of potassium. Modern methods of analysis allow individual regions of crystals to be investigated. This method is important as it allows crystals forming and cooling during different events to be identified.

== Recalibration ==
One problem with argon–argon dating has been a slight discrepancy with other methods of dating. Work by Kuiper et al. reports that a correction of 0.65% is needed. Thus the Cretaceous–Paleogene extinction (when the dinosaurs died out)—previously dated at 65.0 or 65.5 million years ago—is more accurately dated to 66.0–66.1 Ma.

== See also ==
- Grenville Turner, inventor of the technique
- Berkeley Geochronology Center
