= Mid-Brunhes Event =

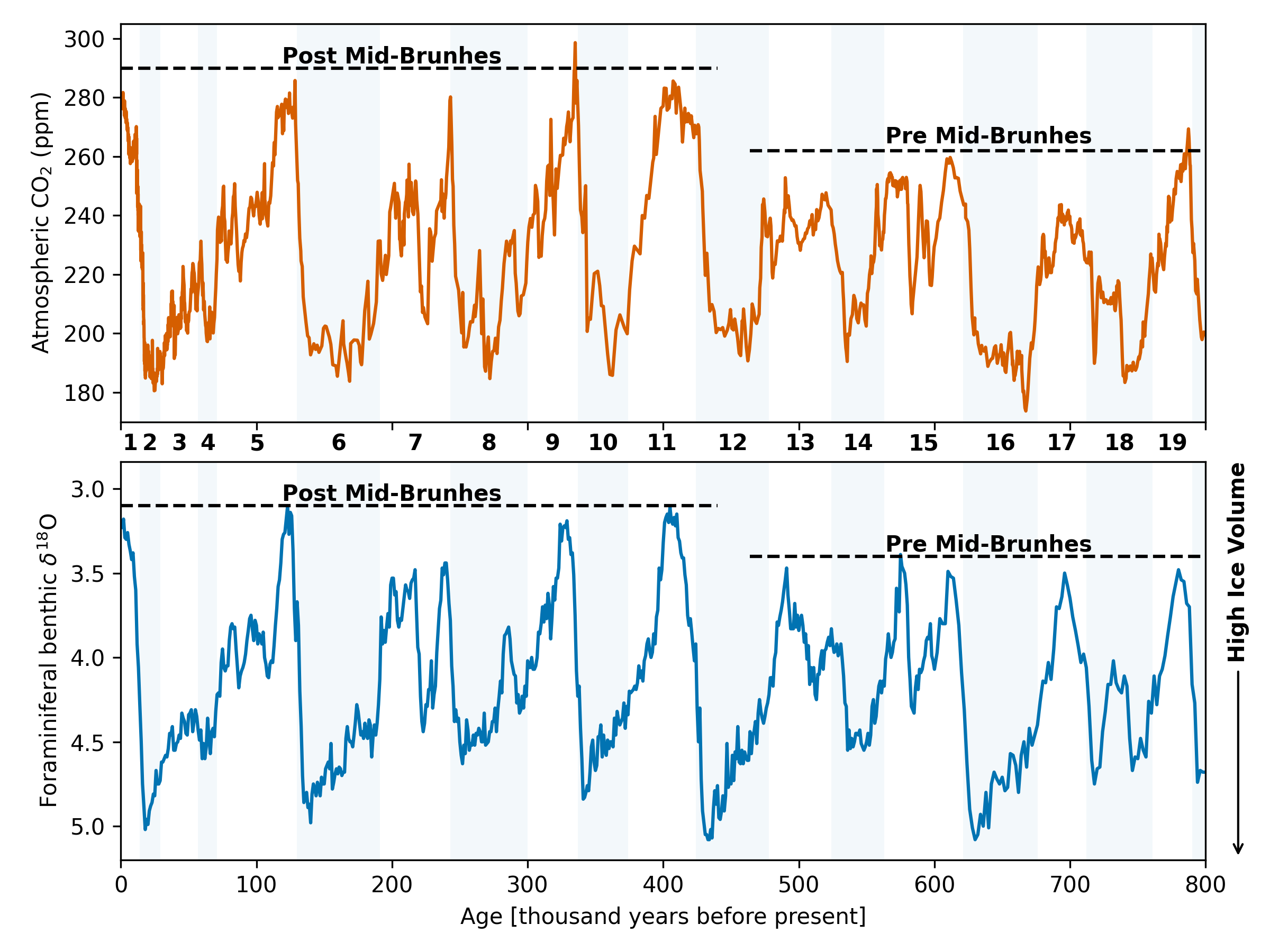

The Mid-Brunhes Event (MBE) is a climatic shift evident in a number of marine sediment and Antarctic ice cores. It corresponds to an increase in amplitude of glacial-interglacial cycles.

The MBE roughly corresponds to the transition between MIS 12 and MIS 11 (Termination V) about 430 kyr ago.

It is characterized by a further increase of ice-volume variations with, from then to the present day, four large-amplitude 100-kyr-dominated glacial–interglacial cycles.
