= Oxygen isotope ratio cycle =

Cyclical variations in the ratio of the abundance of oxygen

Oxygen isotope ratio cycles are cyclical variations in the ratio of the abundance of oxygen with a mass number of 18 to the abundance of oxygen with a mass number of 16 present in some substances, such as polar ice or calcite in ocean core samples, measured with the isotope fractionation. The ratio is linked to ancient ocean temperature which in turn reflects ancient climate. Cycles in the ratio mirror climate changes in the geological history of Earth.

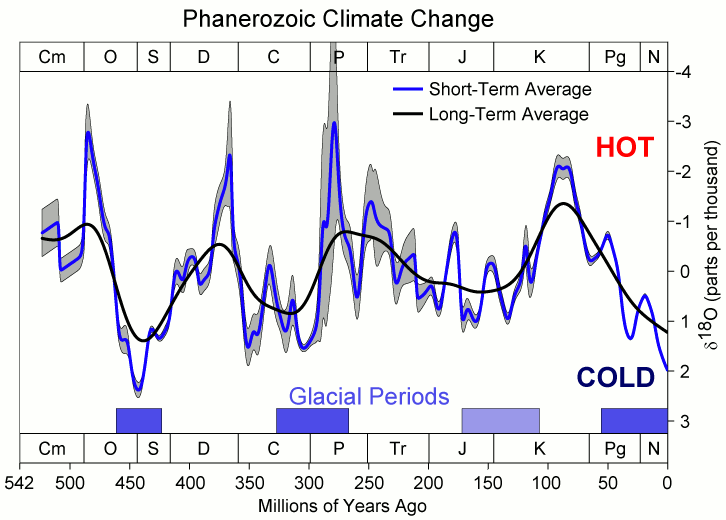
The ^{18}O concentration in fossils over time, measured using δ^{18}O. A higher number δ^{18}O indicates a higher than average amount of ^{18}O in the fossils.

== Isotopes of oxygen ==
Oxygen (chemical symbol O) has three naturally occurring isotopes: ^{16}O, ^{17}O, and ^{18}O, where the 16, 17 and 18 refer to the atomic mass. The most abundant is ^{16}O, with a small percentage of ^{18}O and an even smaller percentage of ^{17}O. Oxygen isotope analysis considers only the ratio of ^{18}O to ^{16}O in a sample.

The calculated ratio of the masses of each isotope in the sample is then compared to a standard, which can yield information about the temperature at which the sample was formed - see Proxy (climate) for details.

== Connection between isotopes and temperature/weather ==
^{18}O contains two additional neutrons in comparison with ^{16}O and causes the water molecule in which it occurs to be heavier by about two atomic mass units. The additional mass changes the hydrogen bonds so that more energy is required to vaporize H_{2}^{18}O than H_{2}^{16}O, and H_{2}^{18}O liberates more energy when it condenses. In addition, H_{2}^{16}O tends to diffuse more rapidly.

Because H_{2}^{16}O requires less energy to vaporize, and is more likely to diffuse to the liquid phase, the first water vapor formed during evaporation of liquid water is enriched in H_{2}^{16}O, and the residual liquid is enriched in H_{2}^{18}O. When water vapor condenses into liquid, H_{2}^{18}O preferentially enters the liquid, while H_{2}^{16}O is concentrated in the remaining vapor.

As an air mass moves from a warm region to a cold region, water vapor condenses and is removed as precipitation. The precipitation removes H_{2}^{18}O, leaving progressively more H_{2}^{16}O-rich water vapor. This distillation process causes precipitation to have lower ^{18}O/^{16}O as the temperature decreases. Additional factors can affect the efficiency of the distillation, such as the direct precipitation of ice crystals, rather than liquid water, at low temperatures.

Due to the intense precipitation that occurs in hurricanes, the H_{2}^{18}O is exhausted relative to the H_{2}^{16}O, resulting in relatively low ^{18}O/^{16}O ratios. The subsequent uptake of hurricane rainfall in trees, creates a record of the passing of hurricanes that can be used to create a historical record in the absence of human records.

In laboratories, the temperature, humidity, ventilation and so on affect the accuracy of oxygen isotope measurements. Solid samples (organic and inorganic) for oxygen isotope measurements are usually stored in silver cups and measured with pyrolysis and mass spectrometry. Researchers need to avoid improper or prolonged storage of the samples for accurate measurements.

== Connection between temperature and climate ==
The ^{18}O/^{16}O ratio provides a record of ancient water temperature. Water 10 to 15 °C (18 to 27 °F) cooler than the modern era represents glaciation. As colder temperatures spread toward the equator, water vapor rich in ^{18}O preferentially rains out at lower latitudes. The remaining water vapor that condenses over higher latitudes is enriched in ^{16}O. Precipitation and therefore glacial ice contain water with a low ^{18}O content. Since larger amounts of ^{16}O water are stored as glacial ice, the ^{18}O content of oceanic water is high. Water up to 5 °C (9 °F) warmer than modernity represents an interglacial, when the ^{18}O content of oceanic water is lower. A plot of ancient water temperature over time indicates that climate has varied cyclically, with large cycles and harmonics, or smaller cycles, superimposed on the large ones. This technique has been especially valuable for identifying glacial maxima and minima in the Pleistocene.

== Connection between calcite and water ==
Limestone is deposited from the calcite shells of microorganisms. Calcite, or calcium carbonate, chemical formula CaCO_{3}, is formed from water, H_{2}O, and carbon dioxide, CO_{2}, dissolved in the water. The carbon dioxide provides two of the oxygen atoms in the calcite. The calcium must rob the third from the water. The isotope ratio in the calcite is therefore the same, after compensation, as the ratio in the water from which the microorganisms of a given layer extracted the material of the shell. A higher abundance of ^{18}O in calcite is indicative of colder water temperatures, since the lighter isotopes are all stored in the glacial ice. The microorganism most frequently referenced for identifying marine isotope stages is foraminifera.

== Research ==
Earth's dynamic oxygenation evolution is recorded in ancient sediments from the Republic of Gabon from between about 2,150 and 2,080 million years ago. Responsible for these fluctuations in oxygenation were likely driven by the Lomagundi carbon isotope excursion.

== See also ==
- δ^{18}O
- Isotope fractionation
