= Marine Isotope Stage 11 =

Marine isotope stage between 424,000 and 374,000 years ago

5 million year history, representing the Lisiecki and Raymo (2005) LR04 Benthic Stack

Marine Isotope Stage 11 or MIS 11 is a Marine Isotope Stage in the geologic temperature record, covering the interglacial period between 424,000 and 374,000 years ago. It corresponds to the Hoxnian Stage in Britain and the Holsteinian in Central Europe.

Interglacial periods which occurred during the Pleistocene are investigated to better understand present and future climate. Thus, the present interglacial, the Holocene, is compared with MIS 11 and Marine Isotope Stage 5e.

== Characteristics ==
MIS 11 represents the longest and warmest interglacial interval of the last 500 kyr. In fact, it shows the highest-amplitude deglacial warming in the last 5 Myr and possibly lasted twice the other interglacial stages. MIS 11 is characterized by overall warm sea-surface temperatures in high latitudes, strong thermohaline circulation, unusual blooms of calcareous plankton in high latitudes, higher sea level than the present, coral reef expansion resulting in enlarged accumulation of neritic carbonates, and overall poor pelagic carbonate preservation and strong dissolution in certain areas. MIS 11 is considered the warmest interglacial period of the last 500,000 years.

== Concentration of CO_{2} ==
Carbon dioxide concentration during MIS 11 was possibly similar to that documented in the pre-industrial period, but not especially high when compared to other interglacial periods (for example, CO_{2} concentration was probably higher during MIS 9). In addition, a peculiar feature of MIS 11 is that an early CO_{2} peak, usually associated to the deglaciation in response to increasing temperatures, is not detected. This unusually small quantity of CO_{2} was a consequence of exceptionally high marine productivity during the beginning of MIS 11.

Seemingly, the long-lasting interglacial conditions that are documented during MIS 11 depend on the peculiar interplay between CO_{2} concentration and insolation. In fact, during periods of both eccentricity and precession minima, even small variations in total insolation might lead the control of climate to greenhouse gasses, in particular CO_{2}.

== Carbonate productivity ==
In shallow-water environments, the development of several major reef systems (such as the Great Barrier Reef) accompanied increased reef carbonate production. Calcium carbonate production peaked in subpolar and subtropical oceans, reflecting a shift in plankton ecology from diatoms to calcareous plankton due to changes in seawater temperatures, which were apparently warmer at low latitudes. The increased production of carbonate in either continental shelves and mid-latitude open-ocean environments may partly explain the high rates of carbonate sediments dissolution during MIS 11 throughout ocean basins, such as the Indian and Pacific. Indeed, increases in regional carbonate productivity can be only explained by increased carbonate dissolution in other (source) areas. Another explanation for the presence of barrier-reef tracts at low latitudes during MIS 11 is that tropical continental shelves were (at least partly) flooded in response to a major marine transgression (see below).

== Sea level & marine transgression ==
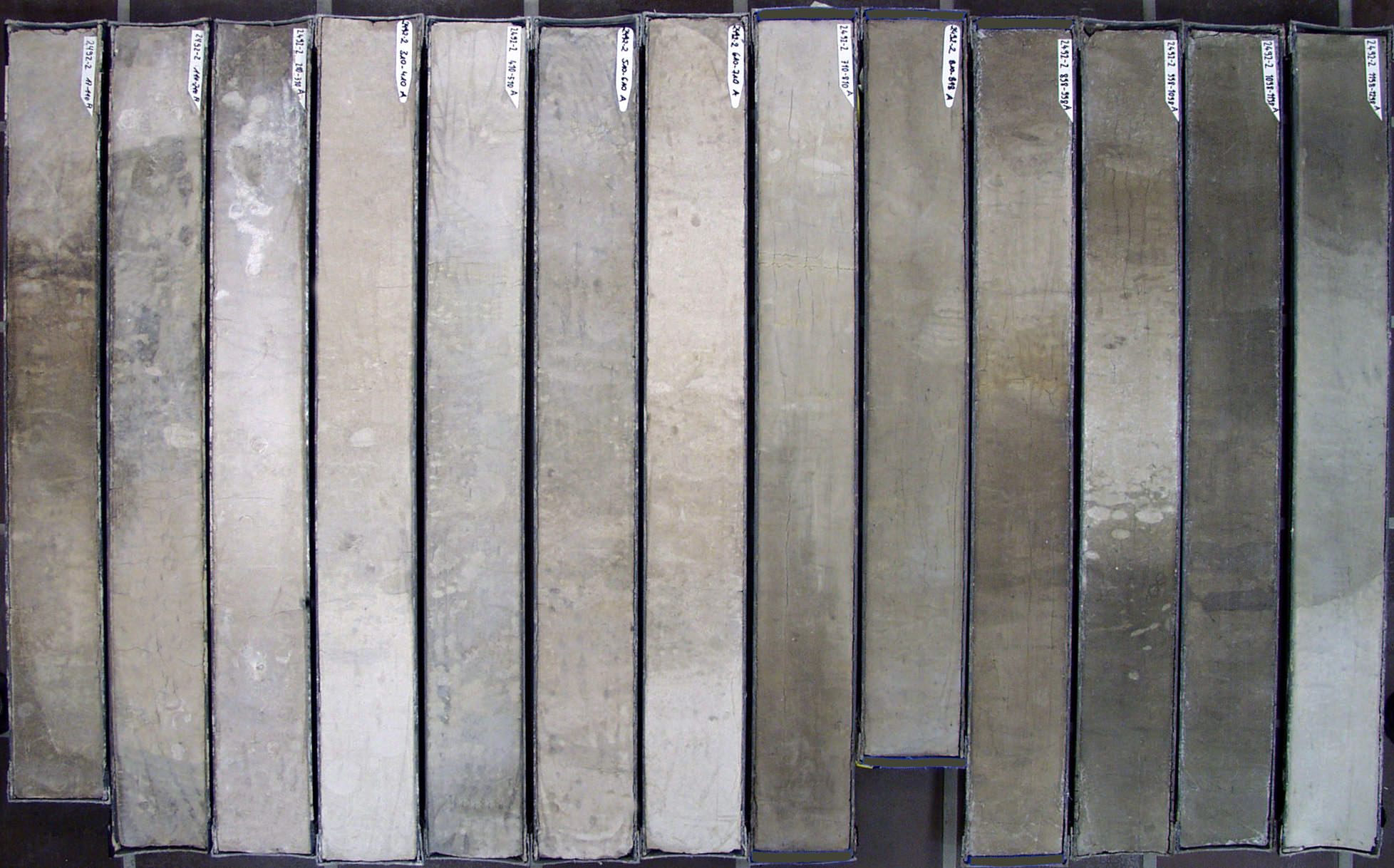
Marine core sections from the South Atlantic, about a million years old

Beach deposits in Alaska, Bermuda and the Bahamas, as well as uplifted reef terraces in Indonesia, suggest that global sea level reached as much as twenty metres above the present. δ^{18}O records show isotopic depletions that are consistent with a sea-level highstand, but temperature effect cannot be confidently disentangled from glacioeustasy. Moreover, the collapse of at least one major ice sheet has to be inferred in order to produce similar high sea-levels, nevertheless, the stability of these ice sheets is one of the main questions in climate-change research: in fact, controversial geologic evidences suggest that present-day polar ice sheets might have been disrupted (or drastically shrunk) during previous Pleistocene interglacials.

The increased sea level requires reduction in modern polar ice sheets and is consistent with the interpretation that both the West Antarctica and the Greenland ice sheets were absent, or at least greatly reduced, during MIS 11. Sedimentary deposits from Greenland suggest a near-complete deglaciation of south Greenland, and a subsequent sea level rise of 4.5 to 6 metres of sea-level-equivalent volume during MIS 11, around 410,000 to 400,000 years ago.

== Astronomical features ==
In contrast to most other interglacials of the late Quaternary, MIS 11 cannot be straightforwardly explained and modelled solely within the context of Milankovitch forcing mechanisms. According to various studies, the MIS 11 interglacial period was longer than the other interglacial stages. The sustained interglacial warmth may have lasted as long as it did, because orbital eccentricity was low and the amplitude of the precessional cycle diminished, resulting in several fewer cold substages during this period and perhaps also induced abrupt climate change at MIS 12–11 transition, the most intense of the past 500 kyrs. It is notable that MIS 11 developed just after one of the most “heavy” Pleistocene δ^{18}O glacials (MIS 12). According to some authors, MIS 12 is likely to represent a “minimum” within the 400-kyr cyclicity (which is apparently “stretched” into ca. 500-kyr cycles in the Pleistocene), same as the MIS 24/MIS 22 complex (ca. 900 ka; Wang et al., 2004). In support of this inference is the observation that these dramatic glacial intervals are coincident with periods of major climate reorganisation, namely the “Mid-Brunhes Event” (Jansen et al., 1986) and the “Mid-Pleistocene Revolution” (Berger & Jansen, 1994), respectively. In view of its pattern of astronomically driven insolation, MIS 11 may be the best analogue for the near future insolation situation. A 2-D Northern Hemisphere climate model used to simulate climate evolution over MIS 11, MIS 5 and into the future implied that the climatic features and length of MIS 11 may be comparable to the present-future interglacial in the absence of anthropogenic forcing. This consideration has led some authors to the conclusion that the current interglacial period (begun 10 kyr) would have continued for approximately 20–25 kyrs even in the absence of anthropogenic forcing.

== See also ==
- Meltwater pulse 1A
- Paleothermometer
- Proxy (climate)
- Timeline of glaciation
