= Don Glaciation =

Major glaciation of eastern Europe

Five million years of glacial cycles are shown, based on oxygen isotope ratio believed to be a good proxy of global ice volume. MIS 16 and MIS 12 appear as the two most severe dips at 0.65 Ma and 0.45 Ma, almost reaching the bottom of the diagram.

The Don Glaciation, also known as the Donian Glaciation and the Donian Stage, was the major glaciation of the East European Plain, 0.8–0.5 million years ago, during the Cromerian Stage of the Middle Pleistocene. It is correlated to Marine Isotope Stage 16 (MIS 16), approximately 650,000 years ago, which globally contained one of the largest glacial volumes of the Quaternary.

== Don Glaciation ==
The Don Glaciation shows evidence of the most extensive ice sheet on the East European Plain, extending into the drainage basin of the middle and lower Don River in Russia, reaching 50 degrees north latitude. This glaciation occurred before the Muchkap interglacial and the Oka and Dnieper glaciations of Eastern Europe.

== Marine Isotope Stage 16 ==
MIS 16 is a major glacial stage identified through measurements of oxygene isotopes in deep sea core samples (marine isotope stage) of Cromerian age, approximately 676-621 ka ago. In terms of global ice volume, it ranks as one of the two most extreme glaciations of the Quaternary, on par with MIS 12. However, in terms of sea water temperatures it is a much more modest glaciation, of similar climate intensity to the neighbouring Cromerian glaciations MIS 14 and MIS 18. The atmospheric concentration of CO_{2} was below 180 ppm for 3 ka during MIS 16, the lowest of the last eight glacial cycles.

== Correlations ==
Don and MIS 16 are usually correlated to each other. This is based on assumption that the most widespread evidence for glaciation in the Cromerian ought to be associated with the largest glaciation on the global scene. However, the time resolution of current age determinations is insufficient for a clear distinction between MIS 14, MIS 16 and MIS 18. It is unclear why the major glaciation of MIS 16 has left very little evidence in the geological records of Western Europe. MIS 16 is believed to correspond to Pre-Illinoian D in North America.

== See also ==
- Timeline of glaciation
