= Stadial and interstadial =

Periods of colder and warmer climate during the Quaternary period

Stadials and interstadials are phases dividing the Quaternary period, or the last 2.6 million years. Stadials are periods of colder climate, and interstadials are periods of warmer climate.

Each Quaternary climate phase has been assigned with a marine isotope stage (MIS) number, which describes the alternation between warmer and cooler temperatures, as measured by oxygen isotope data. Stadials have even MIS numbers, and interstadials have odd MIS numbers. The current Holocene interstadial is MIS 1, and the Last Glacial Maximum stadial is MIS 2.

Marine isotope stages are sometimes subdivided into stadials and interstadials by minor climate fluctuations within the overall stadial or interstadial, which are indicated by letters. The odd-numbered interstadial MIS 5, also known as the Sangamonian interglacial, contains two periods of relative cooling, and so is subdivided into three interstadials (5a, 5c, 5e) and two stadials (5b, 5d). A stadial isotope stage like MIS 6 would be subdivided by periods of relative warming, and so in that case the first and last subdivisions would be stadials; MIS 6a, 6c and 6e are stadials while 6b and 6d are interstadials.

== Distinction between stadials and glacials ==
Generally, stadials endure for a thousand years or less and interstadials for less than ten thousand years, and interglacials last for more than ten thousand and glacials for about one hundred thousand. For a period to be considered an interglacial, it changes from Arctic through sub-Arctic to boreal to temperate conditions and back again. An interstadial reaches only the stage of boreal vegetation.

The MIS 1 interstadial encompasses the entirety of the present Holocene interglacial, but the Wisconsin glaciation encompasses MIS 2, 3, and 4.

Glacials and interglacials refer to the 100,000-year cycles associated with Milankovitch cycles, and stadials and interstadials are defined by the actual oxygen-isotope temperature record.

== List of stadials and interstadials ==
=== Bølling/Allerød interstadial ===
The Bølling oscillation and the Allerød oscillation, where they are not clearly distinguished in the stratigraphy, are taken together to form the Bølling–Allerød Interstadial, and dated from about 14,700 to 12,700 years before the present.

=== Dryas periods ===
The Oldest, Older, and Younger Dryas are three stadials that occurred during the warming since the Last Glacial Maximum. The Older Dryas occurred between the Bølling and Allerød interstadials. All three periods are named for the arctic plant species, Dryas octopetala, which proliferated during these cold periods.

=== Dansgaard–Oeschger events ===
Greenland ice cores show 24 interstadials during the 100,000 years of the Wisconsin glaciation. Referred to as the Dansgaard–Oeschger event, they have been extensively studied, and in their northern European contexts are sometimes named after towns, such as the Brorup, the Odderade, the Oerel, the Glinde, the Hengelo, or the Denekamp.

== See also ==
- Greenhouse and icehouse Earth
- Snowball Earth
- Milankovitch cycles
- Interglacial
