= Maureen Raymo =

American climate scientist and marine geologist

Maureen E. Raymo
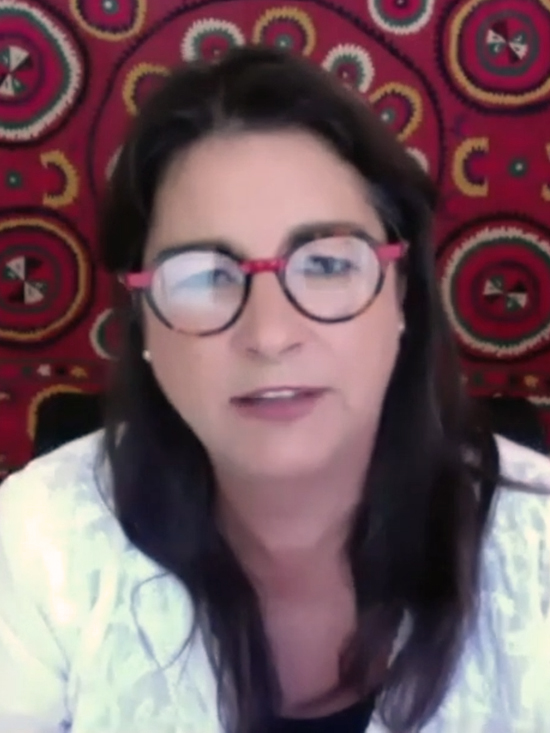
- Born: December 27, 1959 (age 66); Los Angeles
- Education: Brown University (Sc.B); Columbia University (M.A., M.Phil., Ph.D.)
- Awards: Wollaston Medal, Milutin Milankovic Medal, Maurice Ewing Medal
- Scientific career
- Fields: Climate Scientist and Marine Geologist
- Workplaces: Lamont–Doherty Earth Observatory; Columbia University; Columbia Climate School

Maureen E. Raymo (born 1959) is an American paleoclimatologist and marine geologist. She is the Co-Founding Dean Emerita of the Columbia Climate School and the G. Unger Vetlesen Professor of Earth & Environmental Sciences at Columbia University. From 2011 to 2022, she was also the Director of Lamont-Doherty Earth Observatory's (LDEO) Core Repository and, until 2024, was the Founding Director of the LDEO Hudson River Field Station. From 2020 to 2023, she was first Interim Director then Director of Lamont-Doherty Earth Observatory, the first climate scientist and first female scientist to head the institution.

Raymo has done pioneering work on the origin of the ice ages, the geologic temperature record of the Earth, and past sea level change, publishing over 100 peer-reviewed scientific articles. Her work underlies fundamental ideas in paleoceanography including the uplift weathering hypothesis, the "41,000-year problem," the Pliocene sea-level paradox, and the Lisiecki-Raymo δ18O stack.

== Early life and education ==
Raymo was born in Los Angeles, and at age eight sailed with her family to Europe on the ocean liner S.S. United States and resolved to dedicate her life to studying the ocean. The books and films of Jacques Cousteau were also important early influences. Raymo attended Oliver Ames High School in Easton, Massachusetts, where she graduated with the Bausch and Lomb Honorary Science Award, and then attended Brown University, receiving her Sc.B. Geology in 1982. After a brief stint working in a lab, she then attended Columbia University, where she earned her M.A. in Geological sciences in 1985, M.Phil. in Geology in 1988, and Ph.D. in Geology in 1989.

== Career ==
=== Early climate research ===
Raymo is known for developing (with William Ruddiman and Philip Froelich) the Uplift-Weathering Hypothesis. According to this hypothesis, tectonic uplift of areas such as the Himalayas and Tibetan Plateau over the last 40 million years enhanced the chemical weathering of minerals, which removed carbon dioxide from the atmosphere and resulted in cooling that spurred the growth of large ice sheets. Over 35 years later, the hypothesis continues to be actively researched. Their proposed mechanism of CO_{2} removal – the chemical weathering of rock – now underpins projects to sequester anthropogenic CO_{2} via artificially enhanced chemical weathering.

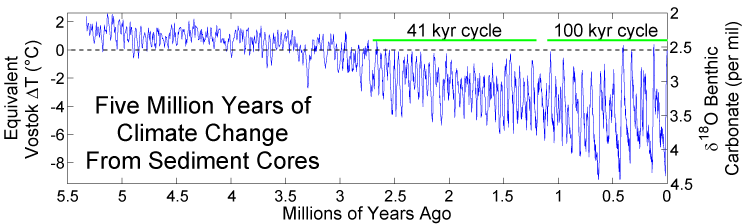
Reconstruction of the past 5 million years of climate history, based on oxygen isotope composition of microfossils in deep sea sediment cores (serving as a proxy for the total global mass of glacial ice sheets)(Lisiecki and Raymo 2005) and to the temperature scale derived from Vostok ice cores following Petit et al. (1999).

Raymo is known for her research using deep sea cores to better understand past oceanic thermohaline circulation, as well as how Earth's Milankovitch cycles influenced ice age pacing over the Pleistocene and Pliocene. Raymo's Anti-phase Hypothesis explains the 41,000 year pacing of Earth's climate cycles from 3 to 1 million years ago as due to the out-of-phase response of the polar ice sheets to orbital precession.

Raymo has also advanced stratigraphy and dating of the past via oxygen isotope analysis of foraminifera from deep ocean sediments. This included publishing the first continuous oxygen isotope stratigraphy and time scale of the northern hemisphere ice ages from DSDP Site 607. In 2005, with her post-doc Lorraine Lisiecki, Raymo published the widely adopted 5-million-year LR04 benthic isotope stack, which remains the benchmark against which most Plio-Pleistocene studies are measured.

In 1996, Raymo used carbon isotopes of marine organic matter to produce the first paleo-CO_{2} estimate for the Middle Pliocene Warm Period, a time when global temperatures were about 2-3 °C above preindustrial levels. Their CO_{2} estimate, between 350 and 400 ppm, later inspired the name of the activist organization 350.org which advocates for a return to 350 ppm as a safe level of atmospheric carbon dioxide.

=== Sea level research ===
Raymo has also worked extensively on reconstructing sea level and ice volume during past warm climate intervals with the goal of improving predictions of future sea level rise in response to global warming. She was the lead investigator of the PLIOMAX project (2011-2018), a research project funded by the US National Science Foundation, which had the goal to deliver more accurate sea level and ice volume data for the Pliocene, a period 3 million years ago when atmospheric CO_{2} was at ~400 ppm. Raymo led and participated in fieldwork in Australia, South Africa, Argentina, and the U.S. to map, interpret, and date Pliocene shorelines. She also worked with Jerry X. Mitrovica to understand the role of glacial isostatic adjustment (GIA) in deforming Pliocene shorelines. They identified this process as one of the reasons for the Pliocene sea level paradox—namely the different elevations of Pliocene shorelines around the globe. Her work also contributed to the mounting evidence that dynamic topography—topography driven by convective forces in the mantle—changes over million year timescales and therefore contributes to the warping of ancient shorelines. Numerical simulations of mantle convection support these findings. New insight gained on Pliocene sea level change has since been used to calibrate the physics underpinning ice sheet simulations of the future Antarctic ice sheet change. Her work on past sea level change and ice sheet stability based on paleo shorelines is complemented by her use of ice rafted debris in marine sediment cores to understand Antarctic ice sheet evolution.

Beyond the Pliocene, Raymo has also worked on sea level change during more recent warm periods. Her work has focused on the Marine Isotope Stage (MIS) 11 interglacial, merging relative sea level indicators with glacial isostatic adjustment models to show that global mean sea level during this time reached 6–13 meters above present. She has also contributed to mapping Last Interglacial (MIS 5e) shorelines in western Australia, Bermuda, Barbados, and the Bahamas to understand how high sea level rose during this time. In particular, she co-authored several studies arguing that global mean sea level during MIS 5e peaked lower than 5m, which is below estimates used in the IPCC report, and an important hypothesis to be tested.

== Awards and honors ==
In 2002, Raymo was named one of the 50 most important women in science by Discover magazine and in 2003 she was awarded a John Simons Guggenheim Fellowship. In 2014, Raymo became the first woman in 183 years to win the prestigious Wollaston Medal, the highest award of the Geological Society of London. In her nomination for the Wollaston Medal, Professor James Scourse described her as "one of the foremost and influential figures in the last 30 years" and "an important role model to women scientists". She also received the 2014 Milutin Milankovic Medal at the European Geosciences Union's annual meeting for her use of geochemistry, geology and geophysics to solve paleoclimatology's big problems. In 2016 she was elected a member of the National Academy of Sciences, and in 2017 became a fellow of the Explorers Club and received a Doctor of Science, honoris causa, from the University of Lancaster, Great Britain. In 2019 she was awarded the Maurice Ewing Medal by the American Geophysical Union. Raymo is a fellow of the American Geophysical Union and the American Association for the Advancement of Science. In 2022 she was elected as a Member of the Royal Swedish Academy of Sciences, Class for Geosciences. In 2026 she was awarded the Nemmers Prize in Earth Sciences.

== See also ==
- Timeline of women in science
