= Isotopes of oxygen =

Isotopes of oxygen (_{8}O)
Main isotopes			Decay	
Isotope	abundance	half-life (t_{1/2})	mode	product
^{15}O	trace	122.27 s	β^{+}	^{15}N
^{16}O	99.757%	stable		
^{17}O	0.0384%	stable		
^{18}O	0.205%	stable		

Standard atomic weight A_{r}°(O)
- [15.99903, 15.99977]; 15.999±0.001 (abridged)

There are three known stable isotopes of oxygen (_{8}O): ^{16}O, ^{17}O, and ^{18}O. Radioisotopes are known from ^{11}O to ^{28}O (particle-bound from mass number 13 to 24), and the most stable are ^{15}O with half-life 122.27 seconds and ^{14}O with half-life 70.62 seconds. All remaining radioisotopes are even shorter in lifetime. The four heaviest known isotopes (up to ^{28}O) decay by neutron emission to ^{24}O, whose half-life is 77 milliseconds; ^{24}O, along with ^{28}Ne, have been used in the model of reactions in the crust of neutron stars. The most common decay mode for isotopes lighter than the stable isotopes is β^{+} decay to nitrogen, and the most common mode after is β^{−} decay to fluorine.

== List of isotopes ==
Nuclide	Z	N	Isotopic mass (Da) (Note: ( ) – Uncertainty (1σ) is given in concise form in parentheses after the corresponding last digits.)	Discovery year	Half-life [resonance width]	Decay mode (Note: Modes of decay: n: / Neutron emission; p: / Proton emission)	Daughter isotope (Note: Bold symbol as daughter – Daughter product is stable.)	Spin and parity (Note: ( ) spin value – Indicates spin with weak assignment arguments.) (Note: # – Values marked # are not purely derived from experimental data, but at least partly from trends of neighboring nuclides (TNN).)	Natural abundance (mole fraction)	
Nuclide	Z	N	Isotopic mass (Da)	Discovery year	Half-life [resonance width]	Decay mode	Daughter isotope	Spin and parity	Normal proportion	Range of variation
^{11}O	8	3	11.05125(6)	2019	198(12) ys [2.31(14) MeV]	2p	^{9}C	(3/2−)		
^{12}O	8	4	12.034368(13)	1978	8.9(3.3) zs	2p	^{10}C	0+		
^{13}O	8	5	13.024815(10)	1965	8.58(5) ms	β^{+} (89.1(2)%)	^{13}N	(3/2−)		
^{13}O	8	5	13.024815(10)	1965	8.58(5) ms	β^{+}p (10.9(2)%)	^{12}C	(3/2−)		
^{13}O	8	5	13.024815(10)	1965	8.58(5) ms	β^{+}p,α (<0.1%)	^{8}Be (Note: Immediately decays into two α particles, for a net reaction of ^{13}O → 3 ^{4}He + p +e^{+})	(3/2−)		
^{14}O	8	6	14.008596706(27)	1949	70.621(11) s	β^{+}	^{14}N	0+		
^{15}O (Note: Intermediate product of CNO-I in stellar nucleosynthesis as part of the process producing helium from hydrogen)	8	7	15.0030656(5)	1934	122.266(43) s	β^{+}	^{15}N	1/2−	Trace	
^{16}O (Note: The ratio between ^{16}O and ^{18}O is used to deduce ancient temperatures.)	8	8	15.994914619257(319)	1918	Stable			0+	[0.99738, 0.99776]	
^{17}O (Note: Can be used in NMR studies of metabolic pathways.)	8	9	16.999131755953(692)	1925	Stable			5/2+	[0.000367, 0.000400]	
^{18}O (Note: Can be used in studying certain metabolic pathways.)	8	10	17.999159612136(690)	1929	Stable			0+	[0.00187, 0.00222]	
^{19}O	8	11	19.0035780(28)	1936	26.470(6) s	β^{−}	^{19}F	5/2+		
^{20}O	8	12	20.0040754(9)	1959	13.51(5) s	β^{−}	^{20}F	0+		
^{21}O	8	13	21.008655(13)	1968	3.42(10) s	β^{−}	^{21}F	(5/2+)		
^{21}O	8	13	21.008655(13)	1968	3.42(10) s	β^{−}n ?	^{20}F	(5/2+)		
^{22}O	8	14	22.00997(6)	1969	2.25(9) s	β^{−} (> 78%)	^{22}F	0+		
^{22}O	8	14	22.00997(6)	1969	2.25(9) s	β^{−}n (< 22%)	^{21}F	0+		
^{23}O	8	15	23.01570(13)	1970	97(8) ms	β^{−} (93(2)%)	^{23}F	1/2+		
^{23}O	8	15	23.01570(13)	1970	97(8) ms	β^{−}n (7(2)%)	^{22}F	1/2+		
^{24}O (Note: Heaviest particle-bound isotope of oxygen, see Nuclear drip line)	8	16	24.01986(18)	1970	77.4(4.5) ms	β^{−} (57(4)%)	^{24}F	0+		
^{24}O	8	16	24.01986(18)	1970	77.4(4.5) ms	β^{−}n (43(4)%)	^{23}F	0+		
^{25}O	8	17	25.02934(18)	2008	5.18(35) zs	n	^{24}O	3/2+^{#}		
^{26}O	8	18	26.03721(18)	2012	4.2(3.3) ps	2n	^{24}O	0+		
^{27}O	8	19		2023	≥ 2.5 zs	n	^{26}O	(3/2+, 7/2−)		
^{28}O	8	20		2023	≥ 650 ys	2n	^{26}O	0+		
This table header & footer:

== Oxygen-14 ==
Oxygen-14 (half-life 70.62 seconds) is the second most stable radioisotope of oxygen, and decays by positron emission to nitrogen-14.

Oxygen-14 ion beams are of interest to researchers of proton-rich nuclei; for example, one early experiment at the Facility for Rare Isotope Beams in East Lansing, Michigan, produced a ^{14}O beam by proton bombardment of ^{14}N, using it to determine the absolute strength of the electron capture transition.

== Oxygen-15 ==
Oxygen-15 (half-life 122.27 seconds) is the most stable radioisotope of oxygen, decaying by positron emission to nitrogen-15.

It is thus the isotope of oxygen used in positron emission tomography (PET). It can be used in, among other things, water for PET myocardial perfusion imaging and for brain imaging. It is produced for this application through deuteron bombardment of nitrogen-14 using a cyclotron.

^{14}N + ^{2}H → ^{15}O + n

Oxygen-15 and nitrogen-13 are produced in air when gamma rays (for example from lightning) knock neutrons out of ^{16}O and ^{14}N:

^{16}O + γ → ^{15}O + n
^{14}N + γ → ^{13}N + n

^{15}O decays to ^{15}N, emitting a positron. The positron quickly annihilates with an electron, producing two gamma rays of about 511 keV. After a lightning bolt, this gamma radiation dies down with half-life of 2 minutes, but these low-energy gamma rays go on average only about 90 metres through the air. Together with rays produced from positrons from nitrogen-13 they may only be detected for a minute or so as the "cloud" of ^{15}O and ^{13}N floats by, carried by the wind.

== Oxygen-16 ==
Oxygen-16 (symbol: ^{16}O or ^{16}_{8}O) is a stable isotope of oxygen, with 8 neutrons and 8 protons in its nucleus, making it a doubly magic nuclide. It is the most abundant isotope of oxygen, accounting for about 99.76% of all oxygen.

The relative and absolute abundances of oxygen-16 are high because it is a principal product of stellar evolution. It can be made by stars that were initially made exclusively of hydrogen. Most oxygen-16 is synthesized at the end of the helium fusion process in stars. The triple-alpha process creates carbon-12, which captures an additional helium-4 to make oxygen-16. It is also created by the neon-burning process.

Prior to the definition of the dalton based on ^{12}C, one atomic mass unit was defined as one sixteenth of the mass of an oxygen-16 atom. Since physicists referred to ^{16}O only, while chemists meant the natural mix of isotopes, this led to slightly different mass scales.

== Oxygen-17 ==
Oxygen-17 (^{17}O) is the rarest of the three stable isotopes of oxygen with a low isotopic abundance of about 0.038% = 380 ppm in terrestrial water and air. Naturally ^{17}O is primarily made by burning hydrogen into helium in the CNO cycle, making it a common isotope in the hydrogen burning zones of stars.

As the only stable isotope of oxygen possessing a nuclear spin (+5/2) and a favorable characteristic of field-independent relaxation in liquid water, through extreme motional narrowing. Thus, ^{17}O enables NMR studies tracing oxidative metabolic pathways (i.e. conversion of ^{17}O_{2} gas to metabolically produced H_{2}^{17}O water by oxidative phosphorylation in mitochondria) especially at high magnetic fields. This is necessary to overcome the otherwise low signal-to-noise ratio (SNR) from low abundance, low gyromagnetic ratio and fast quadrupolar transversal relaxation in contrast to proton/hydrogen, which is the most commonly used nucleus in magnetic resonance.

Water used as nuclear reactor coolant is subjected to intense neutron flux. Natural water starts out with 0.038% of ^{17}O; heavy water starts out incidentally enriched to about 0.055% in that isotopes. Further, the neutron flux slowly converts ^{16}O in the cooling water to ^{17}O by neutron capture, increasing its concentration. The neutron flux slowly converts ^{17}O (with much greater cross section) in the cooling water to carbon-14, an undesirable product that can escape to the environment:

^{17}O (n,α) → ^{14}C

Some tritium removal facilities make a point of replacing the oxygen of the water with natural oxygen (mostly ^{16}O) to give the added benefit of reducing ^{14}C production.

The isotope was first hypothesized and subsequently imaged by Patrick Blackett in Rutherford's lab in 1925. It was likely unintentionally a product out of the first man-made transmutation of ^{14}N and ^{4}He^{2+} conducted by Frederick Soddy and Ernest Rutherford in experiments conducted from 1917–1919. Though hypothesized, its natural abundance in atmospheric air was much later detected in 1929 by Giauque and Johnson in absorption spectra.

== Oxygen-18 ==
Oxygen-18 (^{18}O, Ω) is one of the stable isotopes of oxygen, with roughly 0.20% abundance, and considered one of the environmental isotopes. Most ^{18}O is produced when ^{14}N (made abundant from CNO burning) captures a ^{4}He nucleus, becoming ^{18}F. This quickly (half-life around 110 minutes) beta decays to ^{18}O making that isotope common in the helium-rich zones of stars. Temperatures on the order of 10^{9} kelvins are needed to fuse oxygen into sulfur.

Fluorine-18 is usually produced by irradiation of ^{18}O-enriched water with high-energy (about 18 MeV) protons prepared in a cyclotron or a linear accelerator, yielding an aqueous solution containing ^{18}F as fluoride ion. This solution is then used for rapid synthesis of a labeled molecule, often with the fluorine atom replacing a hydroxy group. The labeled molecules or radiopharmaceuticals have to be synthesized after the radiofluorine is prepared, as the high energy proton radiation would destroy the molecules. Large amounts of oxygen-18 enriched water are used in positron emission tomography centers, for on-site production of ^{18}F-labeled fluorodeoxyglucose (FDG).

Measurements of the ^{18}O/^{16}O ratio (known as δ^{18}O) are often used in paleoclimatology. Water molecules with a lighter isotope are slightly more likely to evaporate and less likely to fall as precipitation, so Earth's freshwater and polar ice have slightly less (0.1981%) ^{18}O than air (0.204%) or seawater (0.1995%). This disparity allows the study of historical temperature patterns via the analysis of ice cores. Assuming that atmospheric circulation and elevation has not changed significantly over the poles, the temperature of ice formation can be calculated as equilibrium fractionation between phases of water that is known for different temperatures. Water molecules are also subject to Rayleigh fractionation as atmospheric water moves from the equator poleward which results in progressive depletion of ^{18}O, or lower δ^{18}O values.

The δ^{18}O ratio can also be used in paleothermometry for certain types of fossils. The fossil material used is generally calcite or aragonite, however oxygen isotope paleothermometry has also been done of phosphatic fossils using SHRIMP. For determination of ocean temperatures over geologic time, multiple fossils of the same species in different stratigraphic layers would be measured, and the difference between them would indicate long term changes.

^{18}O has also been used to trace ocean composition and temperature which seafood is from.

In the study of plants' photorespiration, the labeling of atmosphere by oxygen-18 allows for the measurement of oxygen uptake by the photorespiration pathway. Labeling by ^{18}O_{2} gives the unidirectional flux of O_{2} uptake, while there is a net photosynthetic ^{16}O_{2} evolution. It was demonstrated that, under preindustrial atmosphere, most plants reabsorb, by photorespiration, half of the oxygen produced by photosynthesis. Then, the yield of photosynthesis was halved by the presence of oxygen in atmosphere.

== Oxygen-20 ==
Oxygen-20 has a half-life of 13.51±0.05 s and decays by β^{−} decay to ^{20}F. It is one of the known cluster decay ejected particles, being emitted in the decay of ^{228}Th with a branching ratio of about (1.13±0.22)×10^{−13}.

== See also ==
- Dole effect

Daughter products other than oxygen

- Isotopes of fluorine
- Isotopes of nitrogen
- Isotopes of carbon
- Isotopes of helium
