= Interglacial =

Warmer periods within an ice age

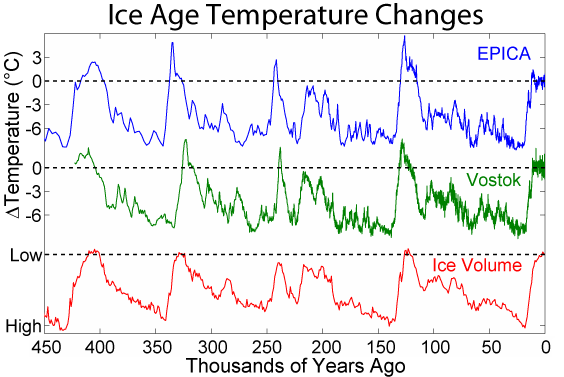
Shows the pattern of temperature and ice volume changes associated with recent glacials and interglacials

An interglacial period (or alternatively interglacial, interglaciation) is a geological interval of warmer global average temperature lasting thousands of years that separates consecutive glacial periods within an ice age. The current Holocene interglacial began at the end of the Pleistocene, about 11,700 years ago.

== Pleistocene ==
During the 2.5 million years of the Pleistocene, numerous glacials, or significant advances of continental ice sheets, in North America and Europe, occurred at intervals of approximately 40,000 to 100,000 years. The long glacial periods were separated by more temperate and shorter interglacials.

During interglacials, such as the present one, the climate warms and the tundra recedes polewards following the ice sheets. Forests return to areas that once supported tundra vegetation. Interglacials are identified on land or in shallow epicontinental seas by their paleontology. Floral and faunal remains of species pointing to temperate climate and indicating a specific age are used to identify particular interglacials. Commonly used are mammalian and molluscan species, pollen and plant macro-remains (seeds and fruits). However, many other fossil remains may be helpful: insects, ostracods, foraminifera, diatoms, etc. Since the Deep Sea Drilling Project, circa 1970, ice cores and ocean sediment cores have provided more quantitative and accurately-dated evidence for temperatures and total ice volumes.

Interglacials and glacials coincide with cyclic changes in Earth's orbit. Three orbital variations contribute to interglacials. The first is a change in Earth's orbit around the Sun, or eccentricity. The second is a shift in the tilt of Earth's axis, or obliquity. The third is the wobbling motion of Earth's axis, or precession.

In the Southern Hemisphere, warmer summers occur when the lower-half of Earth is tilted toward the Sun and the planet is nearest the Sun in its elliptical orbit. Cooler summers occur when Earth is farthest from the Sun during the Southern Hemisphere summer. Such effects are more pronounced when the eccentricity of the orbit is large. When the obliquity is large, seasonal changes are more extreme.

Interglacials are a useful tool for geological mapping and for anthropologists, as they can be used as a dating method for hominid fossils.

Brief periods of milder climate that occurred during the last glacial are called interstadials. Most, but not all, interstadials are shorter than interglacials. Interstadial climates may have been relatively warm, but not necessarily. Because the colder periods (stadials) have often been very dry, wetter (not necessarily warmer) periods have been registered in the sedimentary record as interstadials as well.

The oxygen isotope ratio obtained from seabed sediment core samples, a proxy for the average global temperature, is an important source of information for changes in Earth's climate.

An interglacial optimum, or climatic optimum of an interglacial, is the period within an interglacial that experienced the most 'favourable' climate and often occurs during the middle of that interglacial. The climatic optimum of an interglacial both follows and is followed by phases within the same interglacial that experienced a less favourable climate (but still a 'better' climate than the one during the preceding or succeeding glacials). During an interglacial optimum, sea levels rise to their highest values, but not necessarily exactly at the same time as the climatic optimum.

== Specific interglacials ==
The last six interglacials are:

- Marine Isotope Stage 13 (524–474 thousand years ago).
- Hoxnian / Holstein / Mindel-Riss / Marine Isotope Stage 11 (424–374 thousand years ago).
- Purfleet Interglacial / Marine Isotope Stage 9 (337–300 thousand years ago).
- La Bouchet Interglacial / Arousa Interglacial / Aveley Interglacial / Marine Isotope Stage 7e (242–230 thousand years ago). MIS 7a, MIS 7b and MIS 7c may or may not be included. MIS 7d was a cold period dividing the MIS 7 interglacial into two distinct periods. MIS 7e contained the climatic optimum.
- Last Interglacial / Eemian / Marine Isotope Stage 5e (130–115 thousand years ago). The preceding interglacial optimum occurred during the Late Pleistocene Eemian Stage, 131–114 ka. During the Eemian the climatic optimum took place during pollen zone E4 in the type area (city of Amersfoort, Netherlands). Here this zone is characterized by the expansion of Quercus (oak), Corylus (hazel), Taxus (yew), Ulmus (elm), Fraxinus (ash), Carpinus (hornbeam), and Picea (spruce). During the Eemian Stage (from about 128,000 BCE until 113,000 BCE), sea level was between 5 and 9.4 meters higher than today and the water temperature of the North Sea was about 2 °C higher than at present.
- Holocene (12,000 years ago to the present). During the present interglacial, the Holocene, the climatic optimum occurred during the Subboreal (5 to 2.5 ka BP, which corresponds to 3000 BC–500 BC) and Atlanticum (9 to 5 ka, which corresponds to roughly 7000 BC–3000 BC). The current climatic phase following this climatic optimum is still within the same interglacial (the Holocene). That warm period was followed by a gradual decline until about 2000 years ago, with another warm period until the Little Ice Age (1250–1850).

== See also ==
- Greenhouse and icehouse Earth
- Milankovitch cycles
- Snowball Earth
- Interstadial periods
- Last Glacial Maximum
- Timeline of glaciation
