= Orbital tuning =

Orbital tuning refers to the process of adjusting the time scale of a paleoenvironmental proxy record so that the observed fluctuations correspond to the Milankovitch cycles in the Earth's orbital motion. This is typically done to correct for dating uncertainty or in cases where dating is not possible, such as beyond the range of radiocarbon dating.

== Description ==
Changes in the Earth's orbit affect the amount and distribution of sunlight the Earth and certain parts of the Earth receives. Such changes are expected to introduce periodic climate changes on a time scale of 20-100 kyr. Long records of sedimentation or climate should record such variations. However, such records often have poorly constrained age scales. As a result, scientists will sometimes adjust the timing of the features in their samples to match the predictions of orbital theory in the hopes of improving the accuracy of their data.

== Methods and uses ==
Orbital tuning is done by adjusting the timescale of a paleoclimate record to match variations in an insolated record. These small adjustments synchronize the paleoclimate proxy record to that of orbital cycles. If they are not, scientists are able to adjust one or more points to have these curves better correlate. At long timescales, orbitally forced changes in insolation are known to have a strong signal on climates and ecosystems, so orbital tuning is often an attempt to align proxy records with a known driver (insolation).

Orbital tuning may also be used in cases where changes in sedimentation rate or preservation may cause gaps or hiatuses in a record that may complicate the interpretation of proxy records. For example, disturbances, ecological changes, varying precipitation levels, and other processes can cause shifts in sedimentation or a loss of sediments, and orbital tuning has been used to improve sediment chronologies or recapture missing portions of sediment records that have been lost or affected. Orbital tuning is often used as a countermeasure to effects such as the mixing of top layer sediments by biotic interactions and/or other disturbances to samples. Methods have been developed to support results adjusted by orbital tuning such as radiometric data and more. Orbital tuning can be done to a whole sample but can also be done in short segments. Using it in short segments can greatly reduce the risk of manipulating the data.

== Criticism ==
Criticisms have been raised against orbital tuning and often this tool needs multiple factors to validate its conclusions. When tuning variations in sediment deposit rates are not always because of orbital signals. Orbital tuning can often get these effects attributed to them. Due to this orbital tuning is used as needed over shorter time spans to not produce "overtuning" of a sample. Overturning refers to when a specific record uses too much orbital tuning and all of the data shown supports synchronous changes because it was tuned to match that specific time scale. However, "overtuning" can result in apparent features that have no basis in the real data, such as occurred with the original SPECMAP record.
