= Δ18O =

Measure of the deviation in the ratio of stable isotopes oxygen-18 and oxygen-16

In geochemistry, paleoclimatology and paleoceanography δ^{18}O or delta-O-18 is a measure of the deviation in ratio of stable isotopes oxygen-18 (^{18}O) and oxygen-16 (^{16}O). It is commonly used as a measure of the temperature of precipitation, as a measure of groundwater/mineral interactions, and as an indicator of processes that show isotopic fractionation, like methanogenesis. In paleosciences, ^{18}O:^{16}O data from corals, foraminifera and ice cores are used as a proxy for temperature.

It is defined as the deviation in "per mil" (‰, parts per thousand) between a sample and a standard:

$\delta \ce{^{18}O} = \left( \frac{\left( \frac\ce{^{18}O}\ce{^{16}O} \right)_\mathrm{sample}}{\left( \frac\ce{^{18}O}\ce{^{16}O} \right)_\mathrm{standard}} - 1 \right) \times 1000$ ‰

where the standard has a known isotopic composition, such as Vienna Standard Mean Ocean Water (VSMOW). The fractionation can arise from kinetic, equilibrium, or mass-independent fractionation.

== Mechanism ==
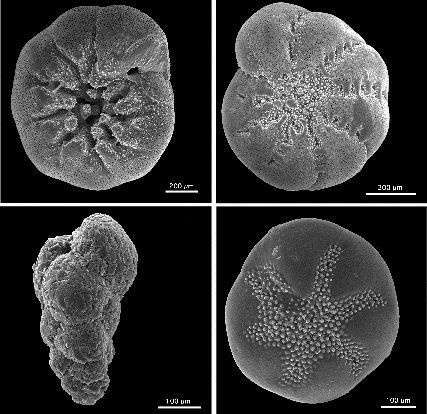
Foraminifera samples

Foraminifera shells are composed of calcium carbonate (CaCO_{3}) and are found in many common geological environments. The ratio of ^{18}O to ^{16}O in the shell is used to indirectly determine the temperature of the surrounding water at the time the shell was formed. The ratio varies slightly depending on the temperature of the surrounding water, as well as other factors such as the water's salinity, and the volume of water locked up in ice sheets.

δ^{18}O also reflects local evaporation and freshwater input, as rainwater is ^{16}O-enriched—a result of the preferential evaporation of the lighter ^{16}O from seawater. Consequently, the surface ocean contains greater proportions of ^{18}O around the subtropics and tropics where there is more evaporation, and lesser proportions of ^{18}O in the mid-latitudes where it rains more.

Similarly, when water vapor condenses, heavier water molecules holding ^{18}O atoms tend to condense and precipitate first. The water vapor gradient heading from the tropics to the poles gradually becomes more and more depleted of ^{18}O. Snow falling in Canada has much less H_{2}^{18}O than rain in Florida; similarly, snow falling in the center of ice sheets has a lighter δ^{18}O signature than that at its margins, since heavier ^{18}O precipitates first.

Changes in climate that alter global patterns of evaporation and precipitation therefore change the background δ^{18}O ratio.

Solid samples (organic and inorganic) for oxygen isotope analysis are usually stored in silver cups and measured with pyrolysis and mass spectrometry. Researchers need to avoid improper or prolonged storage of the samples for accurate measurements.

== Extrapolation of temperature ==
Based on the simplifying assumption that the signal can be attributed to temperature change alone, with the effects of salinity and ice volume change ignored, Epstein et al. (1953) estimated that a δ^{18}O increase of 0.22‰ is equivalent to a cooling of 1 °C (or 1.8 °F). More precisely, Epstein et al. (1953) give a quadratic extrapolation for the temperature, as

$$T = 16.5 - 4.3\mathrm{\delta} + 0.14  \mathrm{\delta^2}$$

where T is the temperature in °C (based on a least-squares fit for a range of temperature values between 9 °C and 29 °C, with a standard deviation of ±0.6 °C, and δ is δ^{18}O for a calcium carbonate sample).

Recent research proposes that early ocean temperatures have been overestimated due to powerful carbonatization and silicification processes in the oceanic crust which consumed oxygen-18.

== Paleoclimatology ==
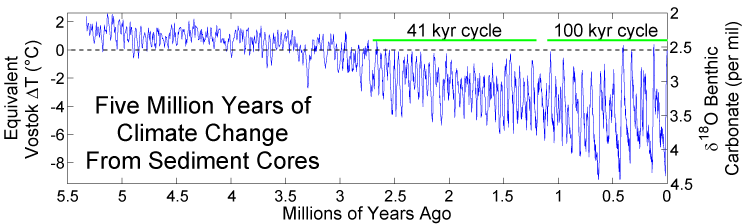
Climate record as reconstructed by Lisiecki and Raymo (2005)

=== Deep-sea Sediments ===
Lisiecki and Raymo (2005) used measurements of δ^{18}O in benthic foraminifera from 57 globally distributed deep sea sediment cores, taken as a proxy for the total global mass of glacial ice sheets, to reconstruct the climate for the past five million years.

The stacked record of the 57 cores was orbitally tuned to an orbitally driven ice model, the Milankovitch cycles of 41 ky (obliquity), 26 ky (precession) and 100 ky (eccentricity), which are all assumed to cause orbital forcing of global ice volume. Over the past million years, there have been a number of very strong glacial maxima and minima, spaced by roughly 100 ky.

=== Ice cores ===
δ^{18}O can also be used with ice cores to determine the temperature from when the ice was formed. Note, that in the ice core record there is the opposite ratio in δ^{18}O, with a negative ratio between ^{18}O and ^{16}O (i.e., -30 δ^{18}O (‰)).

As the observed isotope variations are similar in shape to the temperature variations recorded for the past 420 ky at Vostok Station, the figure shown on the right aligns the values of δ^{18}O (right scale) with the reported temperature variations from the Vostok ice core (left scale), following Petit et al. (1999).

=== Biomineralized tissues ===
δ^{18}O from biomineralized tissues may also be used in reconstructing past environmental conditions. In vertebrates, apatite from bone mineral, tooth enamel and dentin contains phosphate [PO_{4}]^{3−} groups which may preserve the oxygen isotope ratios of environmental water. Fractionation of oxygen isotopes in these tissues may be affected by biological factors such as body temperature and diet.

== See also ==
- δ^{13}C
- δ^{15}N
- δ^{34}S
- Global meteoric water line (GMWL), relation between δ^{18}O and δ^{2}H (also known as δD)
- Isotopic signature
- Isotope analysis
- Isotope geochemistry
- Paleothermometer
- Stable isotope ratio
