= Geologic temperature record =

Very long term changes in Earth's temperature

Life timeline
| ← / Earth formed; ← / Earliest water; ← / LUCA; ← / Earliest fossils; ← / Atmospheric oxygen; ← / Sexual reproduction; ← / Earliest fungi; ← / Neoproterozoic oxygenation event; ← / Ediacaran biota; ← / Cambrian explosion; ← / Earliest tetrapods; ← / Earliest hominoid |
(million years ago)

The geologic temperature record are changes in Earth's environment as determined from geologic evidence on multi-million to billion (10^{9}) year time scales. The study of past temperatures provides an important paleoenvironmental insight because it is a component of the climate and oceanography of the time.

== Methods ==
Evidence for past temperatures comes mainly from isotopic considerations (especially δ^{18}O); the Mg/Ca ratio of foram tests, and alkenones, are also useful. Often, many are used in conjunction to get a multi-proxy estimate for the temperature. This has proven crucial in studies on glacial/interglacial temperature.

== Description of the temperature record ==
=== Pleistocene ===
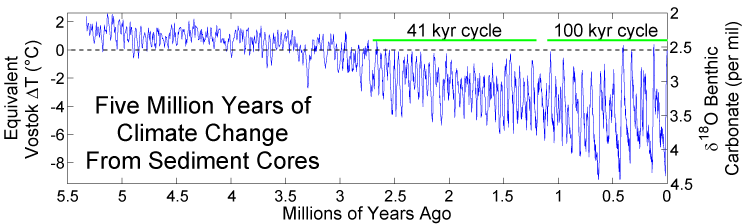
Reconstruction of the past 5 million years of climate history, based on oxygen isotope fractionation in deep sea sediment cores (serving as a proxy for the total global mass of glacial ice sheets), fitted to a model of orbital forcing (Lisiecki and Raymo 2005) and to the temperature scale derived from Vostok ice cores following Petit et al. (1999).

The last 3 million years have been characterized by cycles of glacials and interglacials within a gradually deepening ice age. Currently, the Earth is in an interglacial period, beginning about 20,000 years ago (20 kya).

The cycles of glaciation involve the growth and retreat of continental ice sheets in the Northern Hemisphere and involve fluctuations on a number of time scales, notably on the 21 ky, 41 ky and 100 ky scales. Such cycles are usually interpreted as being driven by predictable changes in the Earth orbit known as Milankovitch cycles. At the beginning of the Middle Pleistocene (0.8 million years ago, close to the Brunhes–Matuyama geomagnetic reversal) there has been a largely unexplained switch in the dominant periodicity of glaciations from the 41 ky to the 100 ky cycle.

The gradual intensification of this ice age over the last 3 million years has been associated with declining concentrations of the greenhouse gas carbon dioxide, though it remains unclear if this change is sufficiently large to have caused the changes in temperatures. Decreased temperatures can cause a decrease in carbon dioxide as, by Henry's Law, carbon dioxide is more soluble in colder waters, which may account for 30ppmv of the 100ppmv decrease in carbon dioxide concentration during the last glacial maximum.

Similarly, the initiation of this deepening phase also corresponds roughly to the closure of the Isthmus of Panama by the action of plate tectonics. This prevented direct ocean flow between the Pacific and Atlantic, which would have had significant effects on ocean circulation and the distribution of heat. However, modeling studies have been ambiguous as to whether this could be the direct cause of the intensification of the present ice age.

This recent period of cycling climate is part of the more extended ice age that began about 40 million years ago with the glaciation of Antarctica.

=== Initial Eocene thermal maxima ===
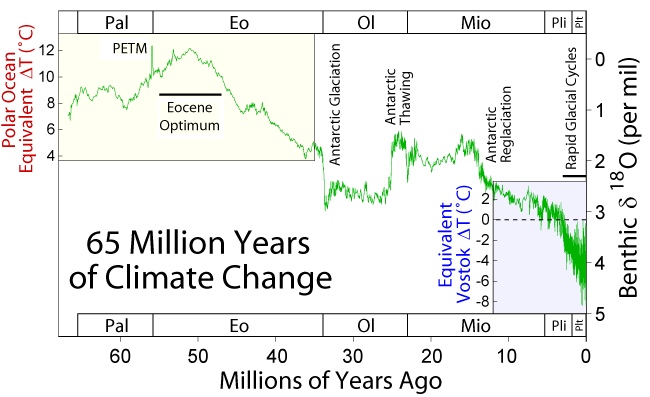
Climate change during the last 65 million years. The true magnitude of the PETM is likely to be understated in this figure due to coarse sampling.

In the earliest part of the Eocene period, a series of abrupt thermal spikes have been observed, lasting no more than a few hundred thousand years. The most pronounced of these, the Paleocene-Eocene Thermal Maximum (PETM) is visible in the figure at right. These are usually interpreted as caused by abrupt releases of methane from clathrates (frozen methane ices that accumulate at the bottom of the ocean), though some scientists dispute that methane would be sufficient to cause the observed changes. During these events, temperatures in the Arctic Ocean may have reached levels more typically associated with modern temperate (i.e. mid-latitude) oceans. During the PETM, the global mean temperature seems to have risen by as much as 5–8 °C (9–14 °F) to an average temperature as high as 23 °C (73 °F), in contrast to the global average temperature of today at just under 15 °C (60 °F). Geologists and paleontologists think that during much of the Paleocene and early Eocene, the poles were free of ice caps, and palm trees and crocodiles lived above the Arctic Circle, while much of the continental United States had a sub-tropical environment.

=== Cretaceous thermal optimum ===
During the later portion of the Cretaceous, from 100 to 66 million years ago, average global temperatures reached their highest level during the last ~200 million years. This is likely to be the result of a favorable configuration of the continents during this period that allowed for improved circulation in the oceans and discouraged the formation of large scale ice sheet.

=== Fluctuations during the remainder of the Phanerozoic ===
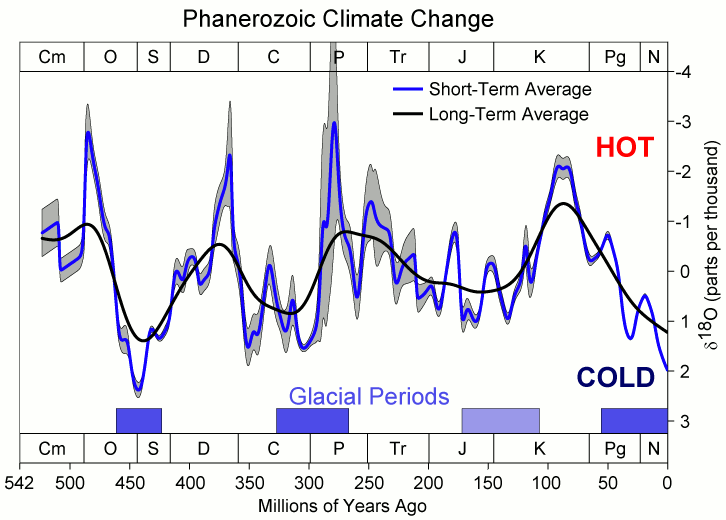
500 million years of climate change

The Phanerozoic eon, encompassing the last 542 million years and almost the entire time since the origination of complex multi-cellular life, has more generally been a period of fluctuating temperature between ice ages, such as the current age, and "climate optima", similar to what occurred in the Cretaceous. Roughly 4 such cycles have occurred during this time with an approximately 140 million year separation between climate optima. In addition to the present, ice ages have occurred during the Permian-Carboniferous interval and the late Ordovician-early Silurian. There is also a "cooler" interval during the Jurassic and early Cretaceous, with evidence of increased sea ice, but the lack of continents at either pole during this interval prevented the formation of continental ice sheets and consequently this is usually not regarded as a full-fledged ice age. In between these cold periods, warmer conditions were present and often referred to as climate optima. However, it has been difficult to determine whether these warmer intervals were actually hotter or colder than occurred during the Cretaceous optima.

=== Late Proterozoic ice ages ===
The Neoproterozoic era (1,000 to 538.8 million years ago), provides evidence of at least two and possibly more major glaciations. The more recent of these ice ages, encompassing the Marinoan & Varangian glacial maxima (about 560 to 650 million years ago), has been proposed as a snowball Earth event with continuous sea ice reaching nearly to the equator. This is significantly more severe than the ice ages during the Phanerozoic. Because this ice age terminated only slightly before the rapid diversification of life during the Cambrian explosion, it has been proposed that this ice age (or at least its end) created conditions favorable to evolution. The earlier Sturtian glacial maxima (~730 million years) may also have been a snowball Earth event though this is unproven.

The changes that lead to the initiation of snowball Earth events are not well known, but it has been argued that they necessarily led to their own end. The widespread sea ice prevents the deposition of fresh carbonates in ocean sediment. Since such carbonates are part of the natural process for recycling carbon dioxide, short-circuiting this process allows carbon dioxide to accumulate in the atmosphere. This increases the greenhouse effect and eventually leads to higher temperatures and the retreat of sea ice.

=== Overall view ===
Direct combination of these interpreted geological temperature records is not necessarily valid, nor is their combination with other more recent temperature records, which may use different definitions. Nevertheless, an overall perspective is useful even when imprecise. In this view time is plotted backwards from the present, taken as 2015 CE. It is scaled linear in five separate segments, expanding by about an order of magnitude at each vertical break. Temperatures in the left-hand panel are very approximate, and best viewed as a qualitative indication only. Further information is given on the graph description page.

=== Other temperature changes in Earth's past ===
About 800 to 1,800 million years ago, there was a period of climate stasis, also known as the Boring Billion. During this period there was hardly any tectonic activity, no glaciations and the atmosphere composition remained stable. It is bordered by two different oxygenation and glacial events.

Temperature reconstructions based on oxygen and silicon isotopes from rock samples have predicted much hotter Precambrian sea temperatures. These predictions suggest ocean temperatures of 55–85 °C during the period of 2,000 to 3,500 million years ago, followed by cooling to more mild temperatures of between 10 and 40 °C by 1,000 million years ago. Reconstructed proteins from Precambrian organisms have also provided evidence that the ancient world was much warmer than today.

However, other evidence suggests that the period of 2,000 to 3,000 million years ago was generally colder and more glaciated than the last 500 million years. This is thought to be the result of solar radiation approximately 20% lower than today. Solar luminosity was 30% dimmer when the Earth formed 4.5 billion years ago, and it is expected to increase in luminosity approximately 10% per billion years in the future.

On very long time scales, the evolution of the sun is also an important factor in determining Earth's climate. According to standard solar theories, the sun will gradually have increased in brightness as a natural part of its evolution after having started with an intensity approximately 70% of its modern value. The initially low solar radiation, if combined with modern values of greenhouse gases, would not have been sufficient to allow for liquid oceans on the surface of the Earth. However, evidence of liquid water at the surface has been demonstrated as far back as 4,400 million years ago. This is known as the faint young sun paradox and is usually explained by invoking much larger greenhouse gas concentrations in Earth's early history, though such proposals are poorly constrained by existing experimental evidence.

== See also ==
- Climate state
- Global warming
- Global cooling
- Instrumental temperature record
- Ocean heat content
- Satellite temperature measurements
- Sea surface temperature
- Thermal history of the Earth
- Timeline of glaciation
- List of periods and events in climate history
