= Lorraine Lisiecki =

American scientist

Lorraine Lisiecki is an American paleoclimatologist. She is a professor in the Department of Earth Sciences at the University of California, Santa Barbara. She has proposed a new analysis of the 100,000-year problem in the Milankovitch theory of climate change. She also created the analytical software behind the LR04, a "standard representation of the climate history of the last five million years".

== Education ==
Lisiecki graduated in 1995 from the South Carolina Governor's School for Science and Mathematics. Lisiecki received her B.Sc. in Earth, Atmospheric, and Planetary Science in 1999 and also obtained an M.Sc. in Geosystems in 2000 from the Massachusetts Institute of Technology. She earned a M.Sc. and Ph.D. in Geological Sciences, both from Brown University in 2003 and 2005 working with Timothy Herbert. Lisiecki's Ph.D. thesis was titled “Paleoclimate time series: New alignment and compositing techniques, a 5.3-Myr benthic δ^{18}O stack, and analysis of Pliocene-Pleistocene climate transitions”.

== Current research ==
Lisiecki's current research focuses on paleoclimatology. Lisiecki's research interest in paleoclimatology arose from the lack of research and current understanding of the glacial cycles. Lisiecki uses various computational and mathematical methods to interpret and compare different paleoclimate records. In specific, she focuses on the evolution of the Plio-Pleistocene climate due to its relation to the Milankovitch forcing, 100-kyr glacial cycles, the carbon cycle, and deep-ocean circulation. Currently, Lisiecki designs and develops software for rendering age models and stratigraphy. As well, Lisiecki is creating 3D models of ocean circulation to determine the relationship between orbital forcing and ocean circulation patterns and account for time-variant uncertainties.

== Contributions ==
=== HMM-Match (Lin et al, 2014) ===
Software designed using a Hidden Markov Model (HMM) for probabilistic sequence alignment of stratigraphic records.

=== Match & Autocomp Software (Lisiecki and Lisiecki, 2002) ===
Paleoceanography software designed to find the optimal alignment of two paleoclimate signals using penalty functions to constrain the rate of accumulation for sediments.

=== LR04 Benthic Stack (Lisiecki and Raymo, 2005) ===
A Pliocene-Pleistocene stack, spanning 5.3-Myr, demonstrating an average of 57 globally distributed Benthic δ^{18}O records collected from scientific literature, which measure ice volume and deep ocean temperature. The records were placed on a common age model, represented by a graphic correlation algorithm. Lisiecki and Raymo's LR04 Stack contains significantly more variance in benthic δ^{18}O, in comparison to former published stacks of the late Pleistocene epoch. In the LR04, there are higher resolution records, an improved alignment technique, and a higher percentage of records from the Atlantic.

The LR04 Stack is one of the most heavily cited Pliocene-entitled papers for δ^{18}O due to the intensive mathematical meticulousness incorporated into the record, the level of objectivity involved, its use of global distribution and duration. The existence of the LR04 Stack serves as a very important tool in paleoceanography.

== Earth's climate history ==
In an effort to find patterns in Earth's climate history, Lisiecki researches ocean sediment cores. The history of Earth's climate lies in the composition of ocean sediments as scientists are able to derive millions of years worth of information through the alignment of these sedimentary layers. Through these layers, Lisiecki found a connection between earth's climate cycle and earth's orbital cycle; assuming glaciation and orbital eccentricity are both on 100,000-year cycles, she found that stronger changes in Earth's orbit correlated with weaker changes in glaciation. The correlation between the two consists of complicated relations as 3 different elements of Earth's orbit; eccentricity, tilt and precession, must be taken into consideration alongside Earth's convoluted climate system.

== 100,000-year problem ==
One previous hypothesis held that the 100,000-year glacial cycles in the past 800,000 years were a result of cyclic changes in the Earth's orbital eccentricity. In 2010, Lisiecki discovered a negative correlation between the strength of glacial cycles and the eccentricity of the Earth's orbit over the past 1.2 million years, suggesting the possibility of internal instability of the Earth's climate in conjunction with its orbital cycles. Lisiecki proposed that this negative correlation is caused by the inhibition of internal climate feedbacks by periods of strong precession forcing. Lisiecki also suggested that long-term internal factors might be responsible, such as the carbon cycle or the ice sheets, though more research is required.

== Awards ==
- Subaru Outstanding Woman in Science Award from the Geological Society of America in 2008.
- Editors' Citation for Excellence in Refereeing for Paleoceanography, 2008
- Joukowsky Outstanding Dissertation Award, 2005
