= Disordered local moment picture =

Illustrations of a magnetic material with varying magnetic order parameter, $m=\|\mathbf{m}\|$, and an indicative temperature, $T$, as compared to the material's Curie (or Néel) temperature, $T_C$. The disordered local moment (DLM) picture provides a means by which to describe thermally induced spin fluctuations within the tenets of density functional theory.

The disordered local moment (DLM) picture is a method, in theoretical solid state physics, for describing the electronic structure of a magnetic material at a finite temperature, where a probability distribution of sizes and orientations of atomic magnetic moments must be considered. It was pioneered, among others, by Balázs Győrffy, Julie Staunton, Malcolm Stocks, and co-workers.

The underlying assumption of the DLM picture is similar to the Born-Oppenheimer approximation for the separation of solution of the ionic and electronic problems in a material. In the disordered local moment picture, it is assumed that 'local' magnetic moments which form around atoms are sufficiently long-lived that the electronic problem can be solved for an assumed, fixed distribution of magnetic moments. Many such distributions can then be averaged over, appropriately weighted by their probabilities, and a description of the paramagnetic state obtained. (A paramagnetic state is one where the magnetic order parameter, $\mathbf m$, is equal to the zero vector.)

The picture is typically based on density functional theory (DFT) calculations of the electronic structure of materials. Most frequently, DLM calculations employ either the Korringa–Kohn–Rostoker (KKR) (sometimes referred to as multiple scattering theory) or linearised muffin-tin orbital (LMTO) formulations of DFT, where the coherent potential approximation (CPA) can be used to average over multiple orientations of magnetic moment. However, the picture has also been applied in the context of supercells containing appropriate distributions of magnetic moment orientations.

Within the context of the KKR method, and in the absence of spin-orbit coupling, the CPA condition describing the paramagnetic state (where the net magnetisation is zero) can be shown to be equivalent to the CPA condition for an Ising 'alloy' of 'up' and 'down' magnetic moments. Once the effects of spin-orbit coupling are included, and magnetic moments are coupled to the crystal axes, it is formally necessary to perform a full integral over all possible magnetisation directions, in practice by sampling an angular mesh of possible magnetisation directions.

Though originally developed as a means by which to describe the electronic structure of a magnetic material above its magnetic critical temperature (Curie temperature), the disordered local moment picture has since been applied in a number of other contexts. This includes precise calculation of Curie temperatures and magnetic correlation functions for transition metals, rare-earth elements, and transition metal oxides; as well as a description of the temperature dependence of magnetocrystalline anisotropy. The approach has found particular success in describing the temperature-dependence of magnetic quantities of interest in rare earth–transition metal permanent magnets, such as SmCo_{5} and Nd_{2}Fe_{14}B, which are of interest for a range of energy generation and conversion technologies.

In computational implementations of the DLM picture within the KKR method, it is common to use the so-called 'frozen potential approximation' when considering intermediate magnetic order parameters, $0<m<1$. This means that self-consistent potentials are calculated in either the magnetic ground state ($m=1$) or the paramagnetic state ($m=0$) and the relevant DLM physics is applied in a non self-consistent manner. This procedure is considered to be most robust when the magnitude of the local magnetic moments on atoms is similar in both the magnetic ground state and the paramagnetic state, i.e. when the local moments are 'good'.
