= Ruhlig =

Ruhlig is a surname. Notable people with this surname include:

- Arthur J. Ruhlig (1912–2003), American physicist
- Chad Ruhlig, vocalist of the band For the Fallen Dreams
