= Nikolai Kasterin =

Russian physicist

Nikolai Petrovich Kasterin (1869–1947) was a physicist and a student of Aleksandr Stoletov. His 1903 doctoral dissertation, portions of which were published in German in the Proceedings of the Royal Academy of Sciences in Amsterdam under the sponsorship of Heike Kamerlingh Onnes, is considered to be a pivotal contribution to multiple scattering theory (MST) by such experts as Paul Peter Ewald and Jan Korringa. The MST formalism is widely used for electronic structure calculations as well as diffraction theory, and is the subject of many books. He lived in the Russian Empire and later the Soviet Union.

== Biography ==
Kasterin studied at the Physical-Mathematical Faculty of Moscow University under the supervision of Aleksandr Stoletov. He graduated in 1892 and continued to work for Stoletov as a laboratory assistant. In 1896-1899, he trained abroad. In 1899, Kasterin returned to Moscow University where he became an assistant professor and taught theoretical physics. In 1905, Kasterin defended his doctoral dissertation "On the propagation of waves in non-uniform medium".

In 1906, Kasterin became a professor at the Department of Physics of Novorossiyskii University in Odessa. He also headed the Institute of Physics. From 1906 to 1922, he was the Chairman of the Department of Physics at Novorossiyskii University.

In 1922, Kasterin moved to the Biophysics Institute in Moscow.

Since 1930, he was a consultant for various scientific institutions including CAGI, Angarsrtoy and the National Institute of Building Materials.

Kasterin authored more than forty scientific publications in theoretical physics. He was also known for his works opposing special relativity.

In the summer of 1944, N. P. Kasterin’s work was criticized by the physics community of the USSR Academy of Sciences. On July 11, a letter from four academicians was sent to V. M. Molotov on behalf of A. F. Ioffe. In this letter, the work of N. P. Kasterin and A. K. Timiryazev was presented as a textbook example of pseudoscience.
