= Jan Korringa =

Dutch-American physicist (1915–2015)

- Jan Korringa in 1975
- Born: 31 March 1915; Heemstede, Netherlands
- Died: 9 October 2015 (aged 100); Laguna Beach, California, U.S
- Occupation: Theoretical physicist
- Known for: KKR method

Jan Korringa (31 March 1915 – 9 October 2015) was a Dutch American theoretical physicist, specializing in theoretical condensed matter physics. He also contributed to the KKR Method.

== Education and career ==
Korringa received his undergraduate degree from the Delft University of Technology. In 1937, Korringa went to Leiden University, Netherlands, to pursue graduate studies. After the closure of Leiden University, Korringa returned to Delft University of Technology. In 1942, he gave a Doctor of Philosophy from Delft University of Technology and published his thesis, Onderzoekingen op het gebied algebraïsche optiek (Essays in the area of science optics). In 1946, Korringa became an associate professor at the University of Leiden. He was a protégé of Hendrik Kramers, who had been the first protégé of Niels Bohr, and who was a large influence on his interest in quantum mechanics.

In 1952, Korringa went to the United States and accepted a full professorship at Ohio State University. He was a consultant at Oak Ridge National Laboratory for many years. During the summers, he collaborated with a group at Chevron Corporation that developed nuclear magnetic resonance logging. In 1962, he was awarded a Guggenheim Foundation fellowship that he used for a sabbatical at the University of Besançon in France.

In a 1947 paper, Korringa showed how multiple scattering theory (MST) could be used to find the energy as a function of wavevector for electrons in a periodic solid. In 1954, Walter Kohn (a Nobel laureate) and Norman Rostoker (a nuclear physicist), derived the same equations using the Kohn variational method. Two of Korringa's students, Sam Faulkner and Harold Davis, started a program at the Oak Ridge National Laboratory using the Korringa-Kohn-Rostoker (KKR) band-theory equations to calculate the properties of solids.

Korringa realized that his equations could be used to calculate the electronic states of non-periodic solids for which Bloch’s theorem does not hold. In 1958 he published an approach, now called the average t-matrix approximation, for calculating the electronic states in random substitutional alloys. That work continued to evolve and was later connected to the higher-level theory called the Coherent Potential Approximation (CPA). Balázs Győrffy and Malcolm Stocks combined it with the KKR theory to obtain the KKR–CPA method, which is presently used for alloy calculations. Korringa’s MST is the basis for numerous theoretical developments, including the locally self-consistent multiple scattering theory developed by Malcolm Stocks and Yang Wang that can be used to obtain the electronic and magnetic states of any ordered or disordered solid.

In 1950, Korringa showed that the spin relaxation rate divided by the square of the magnetic resonance field shift (the Knight shift) obtained from an NMR experiment is equal to a constant, κ, times the temperature T. The magnitude of the Korringa constant κ and its possible deviation from a constant value is the signature of the effects of strong correlations in the electron gas.
