= Balázs Győrffy =

Balázs László Győrffy
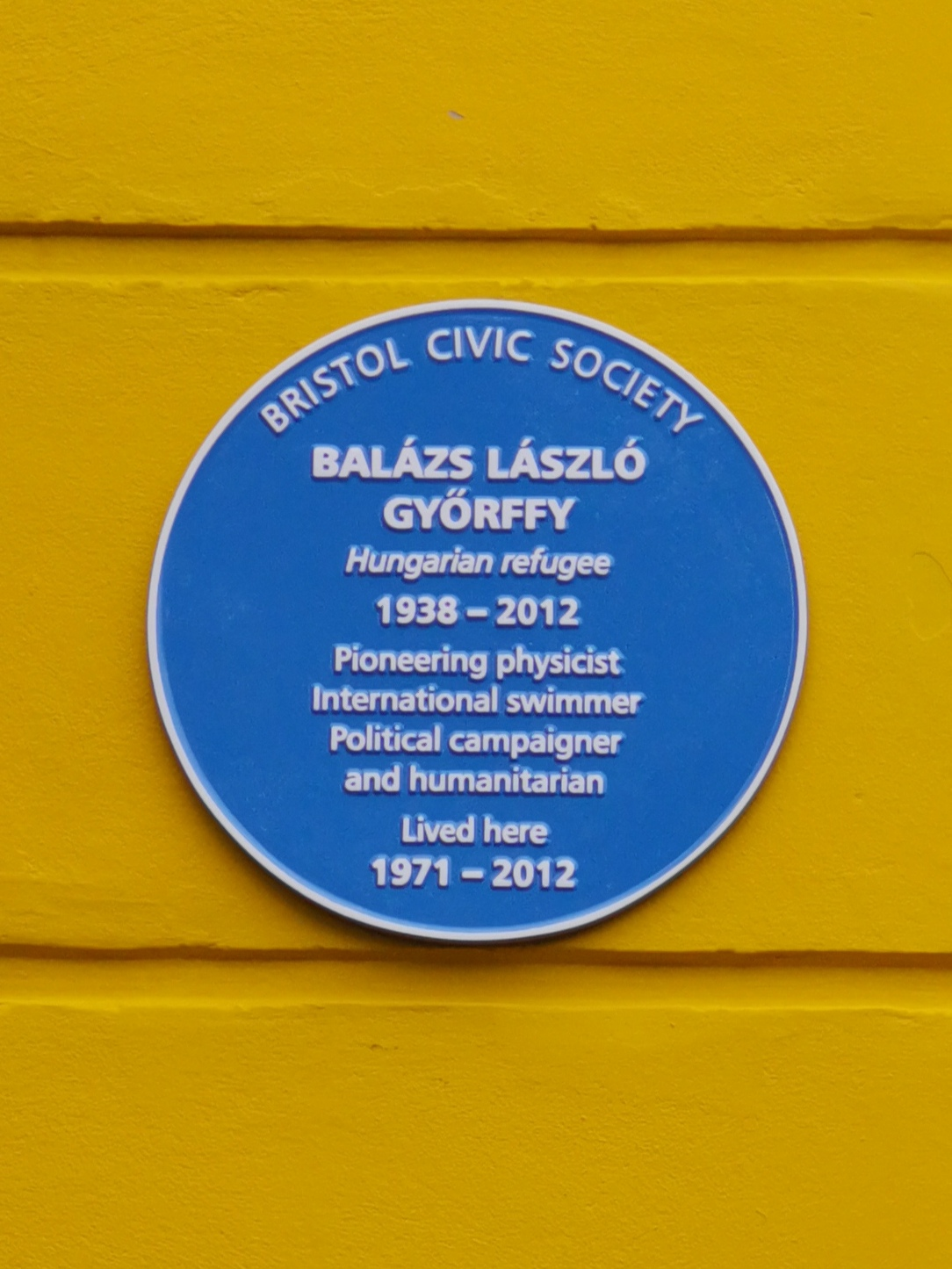
- Commemorative Blue Plaque outside the house where Balazs L Gyorffy lived in Bristol
- Born: 4 May 1938; Eger, Hungary
- Died: 25 October 2012 (aged 74)
- Education: Yale University
- Known for: Gaspari-Gyorffy method; Korringa–Kohn–Rostoker method; Coherent Potential Approximation; Disordered local moment picture
- Awards: Gordon Bell Prize (1998); William Hume-Rothery Award (2001)
- Scientific career
- Fields: Theoretical solid-state physics
- Workplaces: University of Bristol
- Doctoral advisor: Willis Lamb
- Notable students: Warren E. Pickett

Balázs László Győrffy (4 May 1938 – 25 October 2012) was a Hungarian-American-British theoretical physicist. In his obituary, the Times Higher Education described him as "one of the dominant international figures in the development of the theory of condensed matter". Győrffy is thought to be the first person to use the term "electron glue" to describe the sea of electrons binding together the nuclei in materials.

One of Győrffy's main contributions was as one of the pioneers of the application of the Korringa–Kohn–Rostoker coherent potential approximation (KKR-CPA) for first-principle calculations of the electronic structure of alloys. He is also known for his involvement of the development of the disordered local moment (DLM) picture—for describing the electronic structure of magnetic materials above their Curie temperature—and for the Gaspari-Gyorffy method for obtaining the strength of electron-phonon coupling in transition metals superconductors.

Győrffy was born in Eger in 1938, but fled his native Hungary for the U.S. following the Russian invasion in 1956. He was a swimmer of Olympic standard, and this enabled him to secure a sports scholarship at Yale University. Győrffy went on to receive a B.S. and Ph.D. from Yale University, where he studied under Nobel Prize winner Willis Lamb. Since 1970 he was associated with the University of Bristol, where he was a lecturer (1970–1980), reader (1980–1987) and professor (from 1987 onwards). He was an Emeritus professor in Physics at that university until his death in 2012. He also held visiting positions at Oak Ridge National Laboratory, Brookhaven National Laboratory, Institut Laue-Langevin, the University of Toronto, and the Technical University of Vienna.

He was elected an external member of the Hungarian Academy of Sciences in 1995, Fellow of the Institute of Physics in 1998, was a co-recipient of the Gordon Bell Prize in 1998, and was given the 2001 William Hume-Rothery award by The Minerals, Metals & Materials Society.

He died of cancer on 25 October 2012, aged 74.
