= Multiple scattering theory =

Theory for waves passing through multiple obstacles

Multiple scattering theory (MST) is the mathematical formalism that is used to describe the propagation of a wave through a collection of scatterers. Examples are acoustical waves traveling through porous media, light scattering from water droplets in a cloud, or x-rays scattering from a crystal. A more recent application is to the propagation of quantum matter waves like electrons or neutrons through a solid.

As pointed out by Jan Korringa, the origin of this theory can be traced back to an 1892 paper by Lord Rayleigh. An important mathematical formulation of the theory was made by Paul Peter Ewald. Korringa and Ewald acknowledged the influence on their work of the 1903 doctoral dissertation of Nikolai Kasterin, portions of which were published in German in the Proceedings of the Royal Academy of Sciences in Amsterdam under the sponsorship of Heike Kamerlingh Onnes. The MST formalism is widely used for electronic structure calculations as well as diffraction theory, and is the subject of many books.

The multiple-scattering approach is the best way to derive one-electron Green's functions. These functions differ from the Green's functions used to treat the many-body problem, but they are the best starting point for calculations of the electronic structure of condensed matter systems that cannot be treated with band theory.

The terms "multiple scattering" and "multiple scattering theory" are often used in other contexts. For examples, Molière's theory of the scattering of fast charged particles in matter, or Glauber multiple scattering theory for high-energy particle multiple-scattering off nucleons in a nucleus are also denominated that way.

== Mathematical formulation ==
Simulation of a pulse multiply scattered by a randomly arranged set of obstacles (real part and modulus squared of the field).

The MST equations can be derived with different wave equations, but one of the simplest and most useful ones is the Schrödinger equation for an electron moving in a solid. With the help of density functional theory, this problem can be reduced to the solution of a one-electron equation

$$\left[ { - \frac{{{\hbar ^2}}}{{2m}}{\nabla ^2} + V({\bf{r}})} \right]\psi({\bf{r}}) = i\hbar \frac{{\partial \psi({\bf{r}})}}{{\partial t}}$$

where the effective one-electron potential, $V( {\bf{r}} )$, is a functional of the density of the electrons in the system.

In the Dirac notation, the wave equation can be written as an inhomogeneous equation, $\left( {E - {H_0}} \right)\left| \psi \right\rangle = V\left| \psi \right\rangle$, where ${H_0}$ is the kinetic energy operator. The solution of the homogeneous equation is $\left| \phi \right\rangle$, where $\left( {E - {H_0}} \right)\left| \phi \right\rangle = 0$. A formal solution of the inhomogeneous equation is the sum of the solution of the homogeneous equation with a particular solution of the inhomogeneous equation $\left| \psi \right\rangle = \left| \phi \right\rangle + {G_{0 + }}V\left| \psi \right\rangle$, where ${G_{0 + }} = {\lim _{\varepsilon \to 0}}{\left( {E - {H_0} + i\varepsilon } \right)^{ - 1}}$. This is the Lippmann–Schwinger equation, which can also be written $\left| \psi \right\rangle = \left( {1 + {G_{0 + }}T} \right)\left| \phi \right\rangle$. The t-matrix is defined by $T = V + V{G_{0 + }}V + V{G_{0 + }}V{G_{0 + }}V + ...$.

Suppose that the potential $V$ is the sum of $N$ non-overlapping potentials, $V = \sum\limits_{i = 1}^N {{v_i}}$. The physical meaning of this is that it describes the interaction of the electron with a cluster of $N$ atoms having nuclei located at positions ${{\bf{R}}_i}$. Define an operator ${Q_i}$ so that $T$ can be written as a sum $T = \sum\limits_{i = 1}^N {{Q_i}}$. Inserting the expressions for $V$ and $T$ into the definition of $T$ leads to

$$\sum\limits_i {{Q_i}}  = \sum\limits_i {{v_i}(1 + {G_{0 + }}\sum\limits_j {{Q_j}} } ) = \sum\limits_i {\left[ {{v_i}{G_{0 + }}{Q_i} + {v_i}\left( {1 + {G_{0 + }}\sum\limits_{j \ne i} {{Q_j}} } \right)} \right]}$$,

so ${Q_i} = {t_i}(1 + {G_{0 + }}\sum\limits_{j \ne i} {{Q_j}} )$, where ${t_i} = {\left( {1 - {v_i}{G_{0 + }}} \right)^{ - 1}}{v_i}$ is the scattering matrix for one atom. Iterating this equation leads to

$$T = \sum\limits_i {{t_i}}  + \sum\limits_i {{t_i}} {G_{0 + }}\sum\limits_{j \ne i} {{t_j}}  + \sum\limits_i {{t_i}} {G_{0 + }}\sum\limits_{j \ne i} {{t_j}{G_{0 + }}\sum\limits_{k \ne j} {{t_k}}  + } ...$$.

The solution of the Lippmann-Schwinger equation can thus be written as the sum of an incoming wave on any site $i$ and the outgoing wave from that site

$$\left| \psi  \right\rangle  = \left| {\phi _i^{in}} \right\rangle  + \left| {\phi _i^{out}} \right\rangle$$.

The site $i$ that we have chosen to focus on can be any of the sites in the cluster. The incoming wave on this site is the incoming wave on the cluster and the outgoing waves from all the other sites

$(I)$ $\left| {\phi _i^{in}} \right\rangle = \left| \phi \right\rangle + \sum\limits_{j \ne i} {\left| {\phi _j^{out}} \right\rangle }$.

The outgoing wave from the site $i$ is defined as

$(II)$ $\left| {\phi _i^{out}} \right\rangle = {G_{0 + }}{t_i}\left| {\phi _i^{in}} \right\rangle$.

These last two equations are the fundamental equations of multiple scattering.

To apply this theory to x-ray or neutron diffraction we go back to the Lippmann–Schwinger equation, $\left| \psi \right\rangle = \left| \phi \right\rangle + {G_{0 + }}T\left| \phi \right\rangle = \left| \phi \right\rangle + \sum\limits_{j = 1}^N {\left| {\phi _j^{out}} \right\rangle }$. The scattering from a site is assumed to be very small, so $\left| {\phi _i^{out}} \right\rangle = {G_{0 + }}{t_i}\left| \phi \right\rangle$ or $T = \sum\limits_{i = 1}^N {{t_i}}$. The Born approximation is used to calculate the t-matrix, which simply means that ${t_i}$ is replaced with ${v_i}$. A plane wave impinges on a site, and a spherical wave exits it. The outgoing wave from the crystal is determined by the constructive interference of the waves from the sites. Advances to this theory involve the inclusion of higher-order terms in the total scattering matrix $T$, such as$\sum\limits_i {{t_i}} {G_{0 + }}\sum\limits_{j \ne i} {{t_j}}$. These terms are particularly important in the scattering of charged particles treated by Molière.

== Multiple scattering theory of electronic states in solids ==
In 1947, Korringa pointed out that the multiple scattering equations can be used to calculate stationary states in a crystal for which the number of scatterers $N$ goes to infinity. Setting the incoming wave on the cluster and the outgoing wave from the cluster to zero, he wrote the first multiple scattering as

$$\left| {\phi _i^{in}} \right\rangle  = \sum\limits_{j \ne i}^\infty  {\left| {\phi _j^{out}} \right\rangle }$$.

A simple description of this process is that the electrons scatter from one atom to the other ad infinitum.

Since the ${v_i}( {\bf{r}} )$ are bounded in space and do not overlap, there is an interstitial region between them within which the potential is a constant, usually taken to be zero. In this region, the Schrödinger equation becomes $\left[ {{\nabla ^2} + {\alpha ^2}} \right]{\psi _i}\left( {\bf{r}} \right) = 0$, where $\alpha = \sqrt {2mE} /\hbar$. The incoming wave on site $i$ can thus be written in the position representation

$$\phi _i^{in}\left( {{{\bf{r}}_i}} \right) = \sum\nolimits_{l,m} {{Y_{lm}}\left( {{{\bf{r}}_i}} \right){j_l}\left( {\alpha {r_i}} \right)d_{lm}^i}$$,

where the $d_{lm}^i$ are undetermined coefficients and ${{\bf{r}}_i} = {\bf{r}} - {{\bf{R}}_i}$. The Green's function may be expanded in the interstitial region

$${G_{0 + }}\left( {{\bf{r}} - {\bf{r'}}} \right) =  - i\alpha \sum\limits_{l',m'} {{Y_{l',m'}}\left( {{{\bf{r}}_i}} \right)h_{_{l'}}^ + \left( {\alpha {r_i}} \right){j_{l'}}\left( {\alpha {{r'}_i}} \right)Y_{l',m'}^*\left( {{{{\bf{r'}}}_i}} \right)}$$,

and the outgoing Hankel function can be written

$$- i\alpha {Y_{l'm'}}\left( {{{\bf{r}}_j}} \right)h_{l'}^ + \left( {{r_j}} \right) = \sum\limits_{l,m} {{Y_{lm}}\left( {{{\bf{r}}_i}} \right){j_l}\left( {\alpha {r_i}} \right){g_{lm,l'm'}}\left( {E,{{\bf{R}}_{ij}}} \right)}$$.

This leads to a set of homogeneous simultaneous equations that determines the unknown coefficients $d_{lm}^i$

$$\sum\limits_{j,l''m''} {\left[ {{\delta _{ij}}{\delta _{lm,l''m''}} - \left( {1 - {\delta _{ij}}} \right)\sum\limits_{l'm'} {{g_{lm,l'm'}}\left( {E,{{\bf{R}}_{ij}}} \right)t_{l'm',l''m''}^j\left( E \right)} } \right]d_{l''m''}^j}  = 0$$,

which is a solution in principle of the multiple scattering equations for stationary states. This theory is very important for studies in condensed matter physics.

== Periodic solids, one atom per unit cell ==
The calculation of stationary states is simplified considerably for periodic solids in which all of the potentials ${v_i}( {{{\bf{r}}_i}} )$ are the same, and the nuclear positions ${{\bf{R}}_i}$ form a periodic array. Bloch's theorem holds for such a system, which means that the solutions of the Schrödinger equation may be written as a Bloch wave ${\psi _{\bf{k}}}\left( {{\bf{r}} + {{\bf{R}}_i}} \right) = {e^{i{\bf{k}} \cdot {{\bf{R}}_i}}}{\psi _{\bf{k}}}\left( {\bf{r}} \right)$.

It is more convenient to deal with a symmetric matrix for the coefficients, and this can be done by defining

$$c_{lm}^i = \sum\nolimits_{l'm'} {t_{lm,l'm'}^i\left( E \right)d_{l'm'}^i}$$.

These coefficients satisfy the set of linear equations $\sum\limits_{j,l'm'} {M_{lm,l'm'}^{ij}c_{l'm'}^j = 0}$, with the elements of the matrix ${\bf{M}}$ being

$$M_{lm,l'm'}^{ij} = m_{lm,l'm'}^i{\delta _{ij}} - \left( {1 - {\delta _{ij}}} \right){g_{lm,l'm'}}\left( {E,{{\bf{R}}_{ij}}} \right)$$,

and the $m_{lm,l'm'}^i$ are the elements of the inverse of the t-matrix.

For a Bloch wave the coefficients depend on the site only through a phase factor, $c_{l'm'}^j = {e^{ - i{\bf{k}} \cdot {{\bf{R}}_j}}}{c_{l'm'}}\left( E,{\bf{k}} \right)$, and the ${c_{l'm'}}\left( E,{\bf{k}} \right)$ satisfy the homogeneous equations

$$\sum\limits_{l'm'} {{M_{lm,l'm'}}\left( {E,{\bf{k}}} \right){c_{l'm'}}\left(E, {\bf{k}} \right) = 0}$$,

where ${M_{lm,l'm'}}\left( {E,{\bf{k}}} \right) = {m_{lm,l'm'}}\left( E \right) - {A_{lm,l'm'}}\left( {E,{\bf{k}}} \right)$ and ${A_{lm,l'm'}}\left( {E,{\bf{k}}} \right) = \sum\limits_{j} {{e^{i{\bf{k}} \cdot {{\bf{R}}_{ij}}}}} {g_{lm,l'm'}}\left( {E,{{\bf{R}}_{ij}}} \right)$.

Walter Kohn and Norman Rostoker derived this same theory using the Kohn variational method. It is called the Korringa–Kohn–Rostoker method (KKR method) for band theory calculations. Ewald derived a mathematically sophisticated summation process that makes it possible to calculate the structure constants, ${A_{lm,l'm'}}\left( {E,{\bf{k}}} \right)$. The energy eigenvalues of the periodic solid for a particular ${\bf{k}}$, ${E_b}\left( {\bf{k}} \right)$, are the roots of the equation $\det {\bf{M}}\left( {E,{\bf{k}}} \right) = 0$. The eigenfunctions are found by solving for the ${c_{l,m}}\left( {E,k} \right)$ with $E = {E_b}\left( {\bf{k}} \right)$. The dimension of these matrix equations is technically infinite, but by ignoring all contributions that correspond to an angular momentum quantum number $l$ greater than ${l_{\max }}$, they have dimension ${\left( {{l_{\max }} + 1} \right)^2}$. The justification for this approximation is that the matrix elements of the t-matrix ${t_{lm,l'm'}}$ are very small when $l$ and $l'$ are greater than ${l_{\max }}$, and the elements of the inverse matrix ${m_{lm,l'm'}}$ are very large.

In the original derivations of the KKR method, spherically symmetric muffin-tin potentials were used. Such potentials have the advantage that the inverse of the scattering matrix is diagonal in $l$

$${m_{lm,l'm'}} = \left[ {\alpha \cot {\delta _l}\left( E \right) - i\alpha } \right]{\delta _{l,l'}}{\delta _{m,m'}}$$,

where ${\delta _l}\left( E \right)$ is the scattering phase shift that appears in the partial wave analysis in scattering theory. It is also easier to visualize the waves scattering from one atom to another, and ${l_{\max }} = 3$ can be used in many applications. The muffin-tin approximation is adequate for most metals in a close-packed arrangement. It cannot be used for calculating forces between atoms, or for important systems like semiconductors.

== Extensions of the theory ==
It is now known that the KKR method can be used with space-filling non-spherical potentials. It can be extended to treat crystals with any number of atoms in a unit cell. There are versions of the theory that can be used to calculate surface states.

The arguments that lead to a multiple scattering solution for the single-particle orbital $\psi ({\bf{r}})$ can also be used to formulate a multiple scattering version of the single-particle Green's function $G(E,{\bf{r}},{\bf{r'}})$ which is a solution of the equation

$$\left[ { - \frac{{{\hbar ^2}}}{{2m}}{\nabla ^2} + V({\bf{r}}) - E} \right]G(E,{\bf{r}},{\bf{r'}}) =  - \delta ({\bf{r}} - {\bf{r'}})$$.

The potential $V({\bf{r}})$ is the same one from density functional theory that was used in the preceding discussion. With this Green's function and the Korringa–Kohn–Rostoker method, the Korringa–Kohn–Rostoker coherent potential approximation (KKR-CPA) is obtained. The KKR-CPA is used to calculate the electronic states for substitutional solid-solution alloys, for which Bloch's theorem does not hold. The electronic states for an even wider range of condensed matter structures can be found using the locally self-consistent multiple scattering (LSMS) method, which is also based on the single-particle Green's function.
