= Deuterium–tritium fusion =

Type of fusion

The D–T fusion reaction

Deuterium–tritium fusion (D–T fusion) is a type of nuclear fusion in which one deuterium (^{2}H) nucleus (deuteron) fuses with one tritium (^{3}H) nucleus (triton), giving one helium-4 nucleus, one free neutron, and 17.6 MeV of total energy coming from both the neutron and helium. It is the best known fusion reaction for fusion power and thermonuclear weapons.

Tritium, one of the reactants for D–T fusion, is radioactive. In fusion reactors, a 'breeding blanket' made of lithium orthosilicate or other lithium-bearing ceramics, is placed on the walls of the reactor, as lithium, when exposed to energetic neutrons, will produce tritium.

== Concept ==
In D–T fusion, one deuteron fuses with one tritium, yielding one helium nucleus, a free neutron, and 17.6 MeV, which is derived from about 0.02 u. The amount of energy obtained is described by the mass–energy equivalence: E = mc^{2}. 80% of the energy (14.1 MeV) becomes kinetic energy of the neutron traveling at 1/6 the speed of light.

The mass difference between ^{2}H+^{3}H and neutron+^{4}He is described by the semi-empirical mass formula that describes the relation between mass defects and binding energy in a nucleus.

== Discovery ==
Evidence of D–T fusion was first detected at the University of Michigan in 1938 by Arthur J. Ruhlig. His experiment detected the signature of neutrons with energy greater than 15 MeV in secondary reactions of ^{3}H created in ^{2}H(d,p)^{3}H reactions of a 0.5 MeV incident deuteron beam on a heavy phosphoric acid target, ^{2}H_{3}PO_{4}. This discovery was largely unrecognized until recently.

== Reactant sourcing ==
About 1 in every 6700 hydrogen atoms in seawater is deuterium, making it relatively easy to acquire through a girdler sulfide process.

Tritium, however, is a radioisotope with a short half-life and no natural sources. This can be circumvented by exposing lithium to energetic neutrons, which produces tritons. Also, D–T fusion itself emits a free neutron, which can be used to bombard lithium. A 'breeding blanket', made of lithium orthosilicate, is often placed along the walls of fusion machines so that free neutrons created by D–T fusion react with it to produce more ^{3}H. This process is called tritium breeding.

== Fusion reactors ==
D–T fusion is planned to be used in ITER, and many other proposed fusion reactors. It has many advantages over other types of fusion, as it has a relatively low minimum temperature, 10^{8} kelvin.

== Spin polarization ==
Spin-polarized D–T fuel can increase tritium burn efficiency (TBE) by an order of magnitude or more without compromising output. TBE increases nonlinearly with decreasing tritium fraction, while power density increases roughly linearly with D–T cross section. In a 481 MW ARC-like tokamak with unpolarized 53:47 D–T fuel, the minimum tritium inventory was 0.69 kg. Spin-polarizing the fuel with a 63:37 D–T mix reduces the required tritium to 0.03 kg. With advancements in helium divertor pumping efficiency, TBE values of approximately 10%–40% could be achieved using low-tritium-fraction spin-polarized fuel with minimal power loss. This lowers tritium startup inventory requirements.

== See also ==
- Commonwealth Fusion Systems
- Deuterium fusion
- Fusion power#Deuterium, tritium
