= Muffin-tin approximation =

Shape approximation

The muffin-tin approximation is a shape approximation of the potential well in a crystal lattice. It is most commonly employed in quantum mechanical simulations of the electronic band structure in solids. The approximation was proposed by John C. Slater. Augmented plane wave method (APW) is a method which uses muffin-tin approximation. It is a method to approximate the energy states of an electron in a crystal lattice. The basic approximation lies in the potential in which the potential is assumed to be spherically symmetric in the muffin-tin region and constant in the interstitial region. Wave functions (the augmented plane waves) are constructed by matching solutions of the Schrödinger equation within each sphere with plane-wave solutions in the interstitial region, and linear combinations of these wave functions are then determined by the variational method. Many modern electronic structure methods employ the approximation. Among them APW method, the linear muffin-tin orbital method (LMTO) and various Green's function methods. One application is found in the variational theory developed by Jan Korringa (1947) and by Walter Kohn and N. Rostoker (1954) referred to as the KKR method. This method has been adapted to treat random materials as well, where it is called the KKR coherent potential approximation.

In its simplest form, non-overlapping spheres are centered on the atomic positions. Within these regions, the screened potential experienced by an electron is approximated to be spherically symmetric about the given nucleus. In the remaining interstitial region, the potential is approximated as a constant. Continuity of the potential between the atom-centered spheres and interstitial region is enforced.

In the interstitial region of constant potential, the single electron wave functions can be expanded in terms of plane waves. In the atom-centered regions, the wave functions can be expanded in terms of spherical harmonics and the eigenfunctions of a radial Schrödinger equation. Such use of functions other than plane waves as basis functions is termed the augmented plane-wave approach (of which there are many variations). It allows for an efficient representation of single-particle wave functions in the vicinity of the atomic cores where they can vary rapidly (and where plane waves would be a poor choice on convergence grounds in the absence of a pseudopotential).

== See also ==
- Anderson's rule
- Band gap
- Bloch waves
- Kohn–Sham equations
- Kronig–Penney model
- Local-density approximation
