= TAE Technologies =

American nuclear fusion company

TAE Technologies, Inc.
- Formerly: Tri Alpha Energy, Inc.
- Type: Private
- Industry: Fusion power, energy storage
- Founded: April 1998; 28 years ago
- Founders: Norman Rostoker; George Sealy; Harry Hamlin; Andrew Conrad
- Headquarters: Foothill Ranch, California, United States
- Key people: Michl Binderbauer (CEO) Toshiki Tajima(CSO) Cedric Burgher (CFO)
- Number of employees: c. 400 (2025)
- Subsidiaries: TAE Power Management; TAE Life Sciences
- Website: www.tae.com

TAE Technologies, Inc., formerly Tri Alpha Energy, is an American company based in Foothill Ranch, California developing aneutronic fusion power reactors. The company's designs are all based on field-reversed configurations (FRCs) for plasma confinement and are optimized to react hydrogen-boron fuel, also termed proton-boron or p-^{11}B. Their newest design is termed an advanced beam-driven FRC.

TAE regularly publishes theoretical and experimental results in academic journals with hundreds of publications and posters at scientific conferences and in a research library hosting these articles on its website. TAE has developed six generations of original fusion platforms, with a seventh in development as of 2025. It aims to manufacture a prototype commercial fusion reactor by 2030.

== Organization ==
The company was founded in 1998, and is backed by private capital. It operated as a stealth company for many years, refraining from launching its website until 2015. It did not generally discuss progress nor any schedule for commercial production. However, it has registered and renewed various patents.

As of 2021, TAE Technologies had more than 250 employees and had raised over US$880 million.

=== Funding ===
Main financing has come from Goldman Sachs and venture capitalists such as Microsoft co-founder Paul Allen's Vulcan Inc., Rockefeller's Venrock, and Richard Kramlich's New Enterprise Associates. The Government of Russia, through the joint-stock company Rusnano, invested in Tri Alpha Energy in October 2012, and Anatoly Chubais, Rusnano CEO, became a board member. Other investors include the Wellcome Trust and the Kuwait Investment Authority. As of July 2017 the company reported that it had raised more than $500 million in backing. As of 2020, it had raised over $600 million, which rose to around $880 million in 2021 and $1.2 billion as of 2022.

=== Leadership and board of directors ===
TAE's technology was co-founded by physicist Norman Rostoker, as a spin-off of his work at the University of California, Irvine. Steven Specker, former CEO of the Electrical Power Research Institute (EPRI), was CEO from October 2016 to July 2018. Michl Binderbauer, who earned his PhD. in plasma physics under the guidance of Rostoker at UCI, moved from CTO to CEO following Specker's retirement. Specker remains an advisor. Further board members include Jeff Immelt, former CEO of General Electric; John J. Mack, former CEO of Morgan Stanley; and Ernest Moniz, former United States Secretary of Energy at the US Department of Energy, who joined the company's board of directors in May 2017.

=== Collaborators ===
Since 2014 TAE Technologies has worked with Google to develop a process to analyze the data collected on plasma behavior in fusion reactors. In 2017, using a machine learning tool developed through the partnership and based on the "Optometrist Algorithm", it found significant improvements in plasma containment and stability over the previous C-2U machine. The study's results were published in Scientific Reports.

In November 2017, the company was admitted to a United States Department of Energy program, "Innovative and Novel Computational Impact on Theory and Experiment", that gave it access to the Cray XC40 supercomputer.

In 2021, TAE Technologies announced a joint research project with Japan’s Institute for Fusion Science (NIFS), a three year-long study on the effects of hydrogen-boron fuel reactions in the NIFS Large Helical Device (LHD).

In June 2025, Google invested in the company's funding round for fusion energy development. The company raised more than $150 million through Google, Chevron and New Enterprise Associates.

=== Subsidiaries ===
==== TAE Life Sciences ====
In March 2018 TAE Technologies announced it had raised $40 million to create TAE Life Sciences, a subsidiary focused on refining boron neutron capture therapy (BNCT) for cancer treatment, with funding led by ARTIS Ventures. TAE Life Sciences also announced that it would partner with Neuboron Medtech, which would be the first to install the company's beam system. TAE Life Sciences shares common board members with TAE Technologies and is led by Bruce Bauer.

==== TAE Power Solutions ====
In September 2021, TAE Technologies announced formation of a new division, Power Solutions, to commercialize the power management systems developed on the C-2W/Norman reactor for the electric vehicle, charging infrastructure, and energy storage markets, with UK-based industrialist David Roberts as its CEO.

=== Merger with Trump Media & Technology Group ===
In December 2025, TAE Technologies announced a merger with Trump Media & Technology Group (TMTG) valued at $6 billion, and planned to occur in mid-2026. The merger is planned to help TAE with the capital to build a commercial reactor, with TMTG supplying $200 million at signing, and a further $100 million when Form S-4 is filed.

== Design ==
=== Underlying theory ===
An FRC is a loop of plasma. As current moves around it creates a field which self-contains the plasma. In practice, this looks more like a hotdog shape.

In mainline fusion approaches, the energy needed to allow reactions, the Coulomb barrier, is provided by heating the fusion fuel to millions of degrees. In such fuel, the electrons disassociate from their ions, to form a gas-like mixture known as a plasma. In any gas-like mixture, the particles will be found in a wide variety of energies, according to the Maxwell–Boltzmann distribution. In these systems, fusion occurs when two of the higher-energy particles in the mix randomly collide. Keeping the fuel together long enough for this to occur is a major challenge.

TAE's machines spin plasma up into a looped structure called a field-reversed configuration (FRC) which is a loop of hot, dense plasma. Material inside an FRC is self-contained by the fields the plasma creates. As the plasma current moves around the loop, it creates a magnetic field perpendicular to the direction of motion, much like current in a wire would do. This self-created field helps to hold in the plasma current and keeps the loop stable.

The challenge with field-reversed configurations is that they slow down over time, wobble, and eventually collapse. The company's innovation was to continuously apply particle beams along the surface of the FRC to keep it rotating. This beam and hoop system was key to increasing the machines' longevity, stability and performance.

=== TAE's design ===
The TAE design forms a field-reversed configuration (FRC), a self-stabilized rotating toroid of particles similar to a smoke ring. In the TAE system, the ring is made as thin as possible, about the same aspect ratio as an opened tin can. Particle accelerators inject fuel ions tangentially to the surface of the cylinder, where they either react or are captured into the ring as added fuel.

Unlike other magnetic confinement fusion devices such as the tokamak, FRCs provide a magnetic field topology whereby the axial field inside the reactor is reversed by eddy currents in the plasma, as compared to the ambient magnetic field externally applied by solenoids. The FRC is less prone to magnetohydrodynamic and plasma instabilities. The science behind the colliding beam fusion reactor is used in the company's C-2, C-2U and C-2W projects.

A key concept is that the FRC is kept in a useful state over an extended period. To do this, the accelerators inject the fuel such that when the particles scatter within the ring they cause the fuel already present to accelerate in rotation. This process would normally slowly increase the positive charge of the fuel mass, so electrons are also injected to keep the charge roughly neutralized.

The FRC is held in a cylindrical, truck-sized vacuum chamber containing solenoids. It appears the FRC will then be compressed, either using adiabatic compression similar to those proposed for magnetic mirror systems in the 1950s, or by forcing two such FRCs together using a similar arrangement.

The design must achieve the "hot enough/long enough" (HELE) threshold to achieve fusion. The required temperature is 3 billion degrees Celsius (~250 keV), while the required duration (achieved with C2-U) is multiple milliseconds.

TAE's reactor can produce up to 100 times more fusion power output than a tokamak based on the same magnetic field strength, plasma volume, and fuel type. The increased geometric efficiency inherent in the FRC design is enough to compensate for the lower yield and reaction probability of p-B11 fuel and makes the aneutronic reaction viable.

=== The ^{11}B(p,α)αα aneutronic reaction ===
An essential component of the design is the use of "advanced fuels", i.e. fuels with primary reactions that do not produce neutrons, such as hydrogen and boron-11. FRC fusion products are all charged particles for which highly efficient direct energy conversion is feasible. Neutron flux and associated on-site radioactivity is virtually non-existent. So no radioactive waste is created, unlike the short-term byproducts produced in nuclear fusion research involving deuterium and tritium, and unlike the long half life radioactive waste created in nuclear fission. The hydrogen and boron-11 fuel used in this type of reaction is also much more abundant than the fuel used in nuclear fission.

TAE Technologies relies on the clean ^{11}B(p,α)αα reaction, also written ^{11}B(p,3α), which produces three helium nuclei called α−particles (hence the name of the company) as follows:

^{1}p + ^{11}B	→		^{12}C
^{12}C	→		^{4}He	+	^{8}Be
^{8}Be	→	2	^{4}He

A proton (identical to the most common hydrogen nucleus) striking boron-11 creates a resonance in carbon-12, which decays by emitting one high-energy primary α−particle. This leads to the first excited state of beryllium-8, which decays into two low-energy secondary α-particles. This is the model commonly accepted in the scientific community since the published results account for a 1987 experiment.

TAE claimed that the reaction products should release more energy than what is commonly envisaged. In 2010, Henry R. Weller and his team from the Triangle Universities Nuclear Laboratory (TUNL) used the high intensity γ-ray source (HIγS) at Duke University, funded by TAE and the U.S. Department of Energy, to show that the mechanism first proposed by Ernest Rutherford and Mark Oliphant in 1933, then Philip Dee and C. W. Gilbert from the Cavendish Laboratory in 1936, and the results of an experiment conducted by French researchers from IN2P3 in 1969, was correct. The model and the experiment predicted two high energy α-particles of almost equal energy. One was the primary α-particle and the other a secondary α-particle, both emitted at an angle of 155 degrees. A third secondary α-particle is also emitted, of lower energy.

=== Inverse cyclotron converter (ICC) ===
Direct energy conversion systems for other fusion power generators, involving collector plates and "Venetian blinds" or a long linear microwave cavity filled with a 10-Tesla magnetic field and rectennas, are not suitable for fusion with ion energies above 1 MeV. The company employed a much shorter device, an inverse cyclotron converter (ICC) that operated at 5 MHz and required a magnetic field of only 0.6 tesla. The linear motion of fusion product ions is converted to circular motion by a magnetic cusp. Energy is collected from the charged particles as they spiral past quadrupole electrodes. More classical collectors collect particles with energy less than 1 MeV.

The estimation of the ratio of fusion power to radiation loss for a 100 MW FRC has been calculated for different fuels, assuming a converter efficiency of 90% for α-particles, 40% for Bremsstrahlung radiation through photoelectric effect, and 70% for the accelerators, with 10T superconducting magnetic coils:

- Q = 35 for deuterium and tritium
- Q = 3 for deuterium and helium-3
- Q = 2.7 for hydrogen and boron-11
- Q = 4.3 for polarized hydrogen and boron-11

The spin polarization enhances the fusion cross section by a factor of 1.6 for ^{11}B. A further increase in Q should result from the nuclear quadrupole moment of ^{11}B. And another increase in Q may also result from the mechanism allowing the production of a secondary high-energy α-particle.

TAE Technologies plans to use the p-^{11}B reaction in their commercial FRC for safety reasons and because the energy conversion systems are simpler and smaller: since no neutron is released, thermal conversion is unnecessary, hence no heat exchanger or steam turbine.

The "truck-sized" 100 MW reactors designed in TAE presentations are based on these calculations.

== Machine sequence ==
=== Colliding FRCs ===
All earlier TAE machines used a colliding (opposed) FRC geometry starting with two FRCs, one at each end, and then accelerating them into each other strongly to merge in the center, forming one FRC trapped between a group of eight precisely angled opposed neutral beam injectors for further heating, stabilizing, and confinement.

==== Sewer pipe ====
Developed in 1998, the company’s proof-of-concept machine was created using a common sewer pipe and first demonstrated the viability of forming a field-reverse configured magnetic field.

==== CBFR-SPS ====
The CBFR-SPS is a 100 MW-class, magnetic field-reversed configuration, aneutronic fusion rocket concept. The reactor is fueled by an energetic-ion mixture of hydrogen and boron (p-^{11}B). Fusion products are helium ions (α-particles) expelled axially out of the system. α-particles flowing in one direction are decelerated and their energy directly converted to power the system; and particles expelled in the opposite direction provide thrust. Since the fusion products are charged particles and does not release neutrons, the system does not require the use of a massive radiation shield.

==== C-2 ====
Various experiments have been conducted by TAE Technologies on the world's largest compact toroid device named "C-2". Results began to be regularly published in 2010, with papers including 60 authors. C-2 results showed peak ion temperatures of 400 electronvolts (5 million degrees Celsius), electron temperatures of 150 electronvolts, plasma densities of 1·10^{19} m^{−3} and 1·10^{9} fusion neutrons per second for 3 milliseconds.

==== Budker Institute ====
The Budker Institute of Nuclear Physics, Novosibirsk, built a powerful plasma injector, shipped in late 2013 to the company's research facility. The device produces a neutral beam in the range of 5 to 20 MW, and injects energy inside the reactor to transfer it to the fusion plasma.

==== C-2U ====
In March 2015, the upgraded C-2U with edge-biasing beams showed a 10-fold improvement in lifetime, with FRCs heated to 10 million degrees Celsius and lasting 5 milliseconds with no sign of decay. The C-2U functions by firing two donut shaped plasmas at each other at 1 million kilometers per hour, the result is a cigar-shaped FRC as much as 3 meters long and 40 centimeters across. The plasma was controlled with magnetic fields generated by electrodes and magnets at each end of the tube. The upgraded particle beam system provided 10 megawatts of power.

==== C-2W, Norman ====
In 2017, TAE Technologies renamed the C-2W reactor "Norman" in honor of the company's co-founder Norman Rostoker who died in 2014. In July 2017, the company announced that the Norman reactor had achieved plasma. The Norman reactor is reportedly able to operate at temperatures between 50 million and 70 million°C. In February 2018, the company announced that after 4,000 experiments it had reached a high temperature of nearly 20 million°C. In 2018, TAE Technologies partnered with the Applied Science team at Google to develop the technology inside Norman to maximize electron temperature, aiming to demonstrate breakeven fusion. In 2021, TAE Technologies stated Norman was regularly producing a stable plasma at temperatures over 50 million degrees, meeting a key milestone for the machine and unlocking $280 million more in financing, bringing its total funding raised up to $880 million.

In 2023, the company published a peer-reviewed paper reporting the first measurement of p-^{11}B fusion in magnetically confined plasma at the LHD in Japan.

=== Advanced beam-driven FRC ===
Earlier TAE machines used a colliding FRC geometry. In contrast, later machines form one FRC between the group of eight opposed neutral beam injectors. TAE terms the design an advanced beam-driven field-reversed configuration (FRC). It combines features from particle accelerator physics and other fusion concepts in a unique system.

==== Norm ====
In 2025, the company disclosed its Norm reactor. It is half as long as Norman, because the design omits the long quartz tubes formerly extending from both ends of the main chamber.

==== Copernicus ====
The Copernicus device was designed to operate using hydrogen and was expected to attain net energy gain around 2025. The approximate cost of the reactor was $200 million, and it was intended to reach temperatures of around 100 million°C to validate conditions needed for deuterium-tritium fusion while the company scaled to p-^{11}B fuel for its superior environmental and cost profile. TAE intended to start construction in 2022. As of 17 November 2025, the progress of the Norm device obsoleted the need for Copernicus, which became canceled.

==== Da Vinci ====
The Da Vinci device was a planned successor to Copernicus, and is new planned to succeed Norm. It is a prototype for a commercially scalable reactor. It is scheduled to be developed in the second half of the 2020s and to achieve 3 billion °C and produce net fusion energy.

== See also ==
- List of nuclear fusion companies
- China Fusion Engineering Test Reactor
- Commonwealth Fusion Systems
- Dense plasma focus
- Fusion Industry Association
- General Fusion
- Helion Energy
- Polywell
- Spherical Tokamak for Energy Production
