= Michl Binderbauer =

Austrian-American physicist, entrepreneur

- Born: 1969 (age 56–57); Salzburg, Austria
- Education: University of California, Irvine, Ph.D. Plasma Physics 1996
- Occupations: CEO of TAE Technologies, inventor
- Years active: 1998–present
- Known for: Plasma physics and fusion research

Michl Binderbauer is an Austrian-American physicist, and businessman. He is the CEO of TAE Technologies. He holds 40 issued and pending U.S. patents, along with multiple international technology patents. He has published papers on plasma, physics, and fusion.

== Career ==
Binderbauer joined TAE when it was founded in 1998 as CTO, a position he held for 17 years. In May 2017, he became president of the company, and was appointed as the CEO in 2018.

He played a key role in the company's collaboration with Google in utilizing machine learning and artificial intelligence technology for fusion research.

He currently serves on the board of directors for both TAE Technologies and TAE Life Sciences.

== Education ==
Binderbauer received a Bachelor of Science degree in Plasma Physics and a Master of Science degree in Physics from University of California, Irvine. He received his Ph.D. in Plasma Physics from UC Irvine in 1996.

He is a recipient of UC Irvine’s prestigious Lauds & Laurels Award and was among the inaugural inductees into UC Irvine’s School of Physical Sciences Hall of Fame in 2018. He also serves on the Board of UCI Beall Applied Innovation.
