= Warren E. Pickett =

American physicist

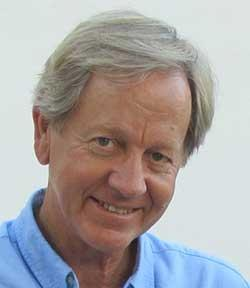
- Education: Wichita State University (BS, MS); Stony Brook University (PhD)
- Known for: condensed matter physics
- Awards: Humboldt Research Award
- Scientific career
- Fields: Theoretical physics
- Workplaces: University of California Davis

Warren Pickett is an American theoretical physicist, known for his work in the field of condensed matter physics and materials properties.

He is Distinguished Professor Emeritus, Department of Physics and Astronomy, University of California Davis. His research has focused on the understanding of materials properties, including high-temperature superconductivity, unusual magnetic ordering, novel transport and thermoelectric response, and nanostructured condensed matter phenomena. He is the recipient of Alexander von Humboldt Professorship and a Simons Foundation Professorship (2012).

He is the fellow of the American Physical Society, Institute of Physics and American Association for the Advancement of Science.

== Education and career ==
After obtaining the BS and MS degrees from Wichita State University, he earned his Ph.D. in Physics from Stony Brook University in 1975, during which he spent a year at the Cavendish Laboratory, Cambridge U.K.

Pickett began his professional career in 1979 as Research Scientist at the Naval Research Laboratory (NRL) in Washington, D.C., where he contributed to the development of computational methods for understanding the electronic structure of materials. His work earned him the Second Prize in the 1990 IBM Supercomputing Competition.

In 1997, Pickett joined the University of California Davis as Professor of Physics. He was promoted to Distinguished Professor in 2002. Pickett served as Chair of the Department of Physics and Astronomy from 2008 to 2011.

In 1990, just after the fall of the Iron Curtain, Pickett was hosted by the Russian Academy of Science for a week visit at the Lebedev Institute of Physics in Moscow, followed by attendance at a conference at the Joint Institute of Nuclear Physics in Dubna.

Pickett has been involved in science diplomacy, beginning with American scientists' visits to the USSR during the Cold War. Initially supported by both the U.S. and U.S.S.R. national academies, this effort is now backed by the U.S. State Department's Office of Science and the American Association for the Advancement of Science. After attending the 2003 Magnetic and Superconducting Materials (MSM03) in Tunisia, Pickett joined the Steering Committee of this biennial event, which promotes research collaboration with developing countries. In February 2014, Pickett visited Iran with Nobel laureate Anthony Leggett and physicist Paul Chu to foster scientific exchange despite political sensitivities. During their two-week visit, they gave lectures at four universities and participated in the 4th National Conference on Advanced Superconductivity at Sharif University.

His research has been supported by the Department of Energy Basic Energy Sciences program, the National Science Foundation Division of Materials Research, with some early support from the Office of Naval Research.

== Selected publications ==
- Pickett, Warren E. (1989). "Electronic structure of the high-temperature oxide superconductors". Reviews of Modern Physics. 61 (2): 433–512. Bibcode:1989RvMP...61..433P. doi:10.1103/revmodphys.61.433. ISSN 0034-6861.
- Pickett, Warren E. (1989). "Pseudopotential methods in condensed matter applications". Computer Physics Reports. 9 (3): 115–197. Bibcode:1989CoPhR...9..115P. doi:10.1016/0167-7977(89)90002-6. ISSN 0167-7977.
- Pickett, W. E.; Singh, D. J.; Krakauer, H.; Cohen, R. E. (1992-01-03). "Fermi Surfaces, Fermi Liquids, and High-Temperature Superconductors". Science. 255 (5040): 46–54. Bibcode:1992Sci...255...46P. doi:10.1126/science.255.5040.46. ISSN 0036-8075. PMID 17739913.
- Pickett, Warren E.; Moodera, Jagadeesh S. (2001-05-01). "Half Metallic Magnets". Physics Today. 54 (5): 39–44. Bibcode:2001PhT....54e..39P. doi:10.1063/1.1381101. ISSN 0031-9228.
- Pickett, Warren; Eremets, Mikhail (2019-05-01). "The quest for room-temperature superconductivity in hydrides". Physics Today. 72 (5): 52–58. Bibcode:2019PhT....72e..52P. doi:10.1063/pt.3.4204. ISSN 0031-9228.
- Pickett, Warren E. (7 April 2023). "Colloquium: Room temperature superconductivity: The roles of theory and materials design". Reviews of Modern Physics. 95 (2) 021001. arXiv:2204.05930. Bibcode:2023RvMP...95b1001P. doi:10.1103/RevModPhys.95.021001.
- Pickett, Warren E. (31 May 1982). "Renormalized Thermal Distribution Function in an Interacting Electron-Phonon System". Physical Review Letters. 48 (22): 1548–1551. Bibcode:1982PhRvL..48.1548P. doi:10.1103/PhysRevLett.48.1548.
