= Korringa–Kohn–Rostoker method =

The Korringa–Kohn–Rostoker (KKR) method is used to calculate the electronic band structure of periodic solids. In the derivation of the method using multiple scattering theory by Jan Korringa and the derivation based on the Kohn and Rostoker variational method, the muffin-tin approximation was used. Later calculations are done with full potentials having no shape restrictions.

== Introduction ==
All solids in their ideal state are single crystals with the atoms arranged on a periodic lattice. In condensed matter physics, the properties of such solids are explained on the basis of their electronic structure. This requires the solution of a complicated many-electron problem, but the density functional theory of Walter Kohn makes it possible to reduce it to the solution of a Schrödinger equation with a one-electron periodic potential. The problem is further simplified with the use of group theory and in particular Bloch's theorem, which leads to the result that the energy eigenvalues depend on the crystal momentum ${\bf{k}}$ and are divided into bands. Band theory is used to calculate the eigenvalues and wave functions.

As compared with other band structure methods, the Korringa-Kohn-Rostoker (KKR) band structure method has the advantage of dealing with small matrices due to the fast convergence of scattering operators in angular momentum space, and disordered systems where it allows to carry out with relative ease the ensemble configuration averages. The KKR method does have a few "bills" to pay, e.g., (1) the calculation of KKR structure constants, the empty lattice propagators, must be carried out by the Ewald's sums for each energy and k-point, and (2) the KKR functions have a pole structure on the real energy axis, which requires a much larger number of k points for the Brillouin Zone (BZ) integration as compared with other band theory methods. The KKR method has been implemented in several codes for electronic structure and spectroscopy calculations, such as MuST, AkaiKKR, sprKKR, FEFF, GNXAS and JuKKR.

== Mathematical formulation ==
The KKR band theory equations for space-filling non-spherical potentials are derived in books and in the article on multiple scattering theory.

The central quantity of the KKR method is the (energy-dependent) Green's function, $G(E)$ for the Kohn–Sham equations, defined as

$G(E) = (E + i \epsilon - H_\mathrm{KS})^{-1},$

where $E$ is the energy, $i$ is the imaginary unit, $\epsilon$ is a small positive constant (taken eventually towards the limiting value of zero), and $H_\mathrm{KS}$ is the Kohn–Sham Hamiltonian. For an infinite periodic system, with a complete set of eigenfunctions for $H_\mathrm{KS}$, denoted $|\psi_i\rangle$ and having associated eigenvalues $\epsilon_i$, this Green's function can be given in a spectral representation,

$$G(E) = \sum_i \frac{|\psi_i\rangle \langle \psi_i|}{E - \epsilon_i},$$

though a major advantage of the KKR method is that the use of multiple scattering theory facilitates recovery of Green's functions for which there is not a convenient spectral representation, such as disordered systems. In real space, the Green's function is represented as

$G(\mathbf{r}, \mathbf{r}', E) = \langle \mathbf{r} | G(E) | \mathbf{r}' \rangle.$

From this real-space representation of the Green's function, the electron density, $n(\mathbf{r})$, and the electronic density of states, $\rho(E)$, are obtained simply via

$$\begin{array}{lcl}
n(\mathbf{r}) & = & -\frac{1}{\pi} \Im \int \mathrm{d}E \; G(\mathbf{r}, \mathbf{r}, E), \\
\rho(E) &=& -\frac{1}{\pi} \Im \int \mathrm{d}^3 \mathbf{r} \; G(\mathbf{r}, \mathbf{r}, E),
\end{array}$$

i.e. they are related to the trace of the Green's function.

The wave function near site $j$ is determined by the coefficients $c_{\ell'm'}^j$. According to Bloch's theorem, these coefficients differ only through a phase factor $c_{\ell'm'}^j = {e^{ - i{\bf{k}} \cdot {\bf{R}}_j}} c_{\ell'm'}(E,{\bf{k}})$. The $c_{\ell'm'}(E,{\bf{k}})$ satisfy the homogeneous equations

$$\sum_{\ell'm'} M_{\ell m,\ell'm'} (E,{\bf{k}}) c_{\ell'm'}(E, {\bf{k}}) = 0,$$

where ${M_{\ell m,\ell'm'}}(E,{\bf{k}}) = m_{\ell m,\ell'm'}(E) - A_{\ell m,\ell'm'} ( E,{\bf{k}})$ and $A_{\ell m,\ell'm'}( E,{\bf{k}}) = \sum\limits_j {e^{i{\bf{k} \cdot \bf{R}_{ij}}}} g_{lm,l'm'} (E,{\bf{R}}_{ij})$.

The $m_{\ell m,\ell'm'}(E)$ is the inverse of the scattering matrix $t_{\ell m,\ell'm'}(E)$ calculated with the non-spherical potential for the site. As pointed out by Korringa, Ewald derived a summation process that makes it possible to calculate the structure constants, $A_{\ell m,\ell'm'} ( E,{\bf{k}})$. The energy eigenvalues of the periodic solid for a particular ${\bf{k}}$, $E_b(\bf{k})$, are the roots of the equation $\det {\bf{M}}(E,{\bf{k}}) = 0$. The eigenfunctions are found by solving for the $c_{\ell,m} ( E,{\bf{k}})$ with $E = E_b( {\bf{k}} )$. By ignoring all contributions that correspond to an angular momentum $l$ greater than $\ell_{\max}$, they have dimension $( \ell_{\max} + 1)^2$.

In the original derivations of the KKR method, spherically symmetric muffin-tin potentials were used. Such potentials have the advantage that the inverse of the scattering matrix is diagonal in $l$

$$m_{\ell m,\ell'm'} = \left[ \alpha \cot \delta_\ell(E) - i\alpha \right]\delta_{\ell,\ell'}\delta_{m,m'},$$

where $\delta_\ell(E)$ is the scattering phase shift that appears in the partial wave analysis in scattering theory. The muffin-tin approximation is good for closely packed metals, but it does not work well for ionic solids like semiconductors. It also leads to errors in calculations of interatomic forces.

== Recent Methodological Developments ==
=== Full-Potential KKR ===
Early implementations of KKR employed muffin-tin or atomic sphere approximations, which restrict the shape of the potential and charge density. These approximations limit accuracy for systems with significant interstitial or non-spherical contributions.

Full-potential KKR removes shape approximations entirely, treating the crystal potential exactly within each atomic region and the interstitial space. Recent advances implement more efficient treatments of the Dyson Green's functions and handle non-spherical potential components rigorously, making full-potential KKR practical for total energies, forces, and electric field gradients.

For example, new algorithms ensure exact Wronskian relations for Green functions and avoid unphysical irregular solutions that can otherwise contaminate charge and spin densities. These improvements enable accurate calculations of electric field gradients and other sensitive properties.

Highly scalable implementations extend full-potential KKR to thousands of atoms, which is transformative for studying complex defects, interfaces, and disordered systems at realistic sizes.

=== Screened KKR ===
The screened KKR (sKKR, also called tight-binding KKR) reformulation introduces a screening transformation to the structure constants of multiple scattering theory, yielding exponentially decaying interaction terms. This substantially improves numerical efficiency, especially for systems with layered geometries or open boundary conditions, such as surfaces and multilayers, where naive KKR structure constants converge slowly.

Screening accelerates convergence and enables linear scaling with system size along principal directions, a key benefit for transport and surface/interface applications.

== Applications ==
The KKR method may be combined with density functional theory (DFT) and used to study the electronic structure and consequent physical properties of molecules and materials. As with any DFT calculation, the electronic problem must be solved self-consistently, before quantities such as the total energy of a collection of atoms, the electron density, the band structure, and forces on individual atoms may be calculated.

One major advantage of the KKR formalism over other electronic structure methods is that it provides direct access to the Green's function of a given system. This, and other convenient mathematical quantities recovered from the derivation in terms of multiple scattering theory, facilitate access to a range of physically relevant quantities, including transport properties, magnetic properties, and spectroscopic properties.

=== Electronic Structure of Periodic Solids ===
One of the earliest and most fundamental applications of the KKR method is the calculation of electronic band structures of crystalline solids. In periodic systems, KKR determines the allowed energy eigenvalues by solving the secular equation derived from multiple scattering among atomic potentials. Modern full-potential KKR implementations, which remove the shape approximations of early muffin-tin methods, allow highly accurate determination of electronic density of states (DOS), Dispersion relation, Bloch spectral Function, Fermi surfaces, total energies and equilibrium structures, Spin- and Orbital Moments, Magnetic Form Factors, electric field gradients and hyperfine parameters.

These capabilities make KKR competitive with plane-wave and augmented-wave approaches for describing both simple and complex materials, including transition-metal compounds and heavy-element systems where relativistic effects are important.

=== Disordered Alloys and Chemical Disorder ===
A particularly powerful feature of KKR is its natural compatibility with the coherent potential approximation (CPA), which provides an efficient treatment of substitutional disorder. The CPA captures the broken translational symmetry of the disordered alloy in a physically meaningful way, with the result that the initially 'sharp' band structure is 'smeared-out', which reflects the finite lifetime of electronic states in such a system. Because the method works directly with Green's functions, configuration averaging over disorder can be performed analytically within CPA, avoiding the need for large supercells. This capability enables accurate predictions of composition-dependent electronic properties, phase stability, and transport behavior in complex alloy systems. The KKR-CPA framework has become one of the most widely used approaches for studying random metallic alloys, high-entropy alloys, impurity effects in semiconductors, defect-induced electronic states.

The CPA can also be used to average over many possible orientations of magnetic moments, as is necessary to describe the paramagnetic state of a magnetic material (above its Curie temperature). This is referred to as the disordered local moment (DLM) picture.

=== Magnetism and Magnetic Interactions ===
KKR plays a major role in the theoretical study of magnetic materials. Using Green's-function-based linear response methods and the magnetic force theorem, KKR calculations can extract exchange interaction parameters between atomic moments. These parameters allow the construction of effective Heisenberg Hamiltonians, which are then used to predict Curie and Néel temperatures, spin-wave spectra, magnetic phase diagrams, non-collinear and chiral magnetic structures.

Because spin–orbit coupling can be treated fully relativistically within KKR, the method is also well suited for investigating magnetic anisotropy, Dzyaloshinskii–Moriya interactions, and skyrmion-hosting materials relevant to spintronics.

=== Superconductivity ===
The real-space solution of the Bogoliubov–de Gennes (BdG) equations within the screened KKR method enables a fully self-consistent description of the superconducting state in three-dimensional crystals, including substitutional impurities, based on the complete normal-state density functional theory band structure. This approach provides a material-specific framework for describing inhomogeneous superconductors and heterostructures directly from first principles. In 2025, Yang Wang and colleagues calculated the electron-phonon coupling from phase shifts using the Gaspari–Györffy method. By incorporating this approach into the MuST code, they established an open-source framework for computing superconducting transition temperatures of metallic alloys from first principles.

=== Transport Properties ===
The Green's-function formalism underlying KKR makes it especially suitable for studying electronic transport. By combining KKR with the Kubo–Greenwood or Kubo–Bastin linear-response formalisms, researchers can calculate electrical conductivity, anomalous and spin Hall effects, magnetoresistance, thermoelectric transport coefficients.

When coupled with CPA, KKR enables realistic modeling of resistivity in disordered alloys and temperature-dependent transport phenomena. In nanoscale systems and layered structures, scattering-based KKR approaches can also be applied to ballistic transport problems using Landauer-type formalisms.

=== Surfaces, Interfaces, and Nanostructures ===
KKR has been successfully extended to systems lacking full three-dimensional periodicity, including surfaces and thin films, multilayer heterostructures, embedded clusters and impurities, nanostructures on substrates.

The screened KKR formulation improves computational efficiency for such geometries by localizing multiple-scattering interactions. These developments allow first-principles investigations of surface electronic states, interlayer exchange coupling, spin-dependent scattering, and interface magnetism, which are central to modern spintronic devices.

=== Spectroscopic Applications ===
Because many spectroscopic signals are directly related to the electronic Green's function, KKR provides a natural platform for calculating spectroscopic observables, including X-ray absorption spectra (XAS), X-ray magnetic circular dichroism (XMCD), X-ray magneto-optics, Appearance Potential spectra (APS), Valence-band / core-level photoemission (PES) and inverse photoemission spectra(IPES), Auger electron spectra (AES), Auger photoelectron coincidence spectra, and electron energy-loss spectra (EELS).

These calculations enable detailed interpretation of experimental measurements by linking spectral features to electronic structure, orbital character, and magnetic polarization.

=== Topological Materials Research ===
Unlike conventional materials, whose properties can often be described primarily in terms of band energies and densities of states, topological materials require information about the global structure of electronic wave functions, including Berry curvature, topological invariants, band connectivity, and surface states. First-principles density-functional theory (DFT) has become one of the principal tools for predicting these phases. Within the broad family of DFT methods, the KKR Green-function method offers several distinctive advantages, particularly for relativistic, magnetic, disordered, and surface-sensitive topological materials.

=== Emerging Directions ===
Recent developments continue to expand the applicability of the KKR method. Integration with advanced many-body techniques such as dynamical mean-field theory (DMFT) or the self-interaction correction (SIC) allows treatment of strongly correlated materials, while large-scale parallel implementations make it possible to study thousands of atoms, including realistic defect environments. KKR-based high-throughput calculations are increasingly used for materials discovery, especially in alloy design and spintronic materials research.
