= Arthur J. Ruhlig =

American physicist (1912–2003)

- c. 1930
- Born: June 13, 1912; Detroit, Michigan, US
- Died: July 26, 2003 (aged 91); Santa Ana, California, US
- Education: University of Michigan
- Known for: deuterium–tritium fusion
- Scientific career
- Fields: Electrical engineering
- Workplaces: United States Naval Research Laboratory; Aeronutronic
- Doctoral advisor: H. Richard Crane

Arthur John Ruhlig (June 13, 1912 – July 26, 2003) was an American physicist who was a pioneer of nuclear fusion research. His little-cited paper with his observations on deuterium–tritium fusion prompted the Manhattan Project to investigate the process.

== Biography ==
Arthur John Ruhlig was born in Detroit, Michigan, on June 13, 1912, the son of Otto and Susan Ruhlig (née Sell). After graduating high school in Fort Wayne, Indiana, he entered the University of Michigan, where he studied under the supervision of H. Richard Crane. He received his doctorate in January 1938 with a dissertation on "The Passage of the Electrons and Positrons Through Lead". In August of that year, he published the article "Search for Gamma-Rays from the Deuteron-Deuteron Reaction" in the Physical Review, in which he recorded his observations on deuterium–tritium fusion. Although not well known or much cited, the paper inspired the Manhattan Project to investigate the process.

Ruhlig joined the United States Naval Research Laboratory as an electrical engineer in 1940 and worked there for the next fifteen years. He joined the Rocket Sonde Research Branch, a department of the Naval Research Laboratory that was engaged in the development of rockets, in 1946, and developed instruments for studying the atmosphere. He then became head of the radiation department and the research area for electron tubes. Although he occasionally published papers, a great deal of his research from this period is still classified. In 1938 he had been the first to observe deuterium–tritium fusion and was one of the first to observe ignited burning fusion plasma, as was produced in thermonuclear tests, and developed a formula for its temperature. As a member of the Naval Research Laboratory, he was involved in the Operation Greenhouse nuclear test series in 1951 and the leader of a diagnostic group responsible for amplifiers and transmission lines.

In 1956, Ruhlig joined Aeronutronic, an engineering and research company later acquired by Ford Motor Company and merged with Philco, as the head of its radar and electronics laboratory. He became head of the physics and data processing department of Ford in Newport Beach, California, in 1960, and the following year was appointed its senior staff scientist. Over the course of that decade, he was involved in the development of a laser system for the United States Air Force.

Ruhlig could fluently read in German, French and Russian, as well as English. He married Emily Alverna Taisey; they had three children. They were married until she died in 2001. Ruhlig died in Santa Ana, California, on July 26, 2003.
