= Nickel-62 =

Isotope of nickel

General
- Symbol: ^{62}Ni
- Names: nickel-62
- Protons (Z): 28
- Neutrons (N): 34

Nuclide data
- Natural abundance: 3.6346%
- Half-life (t_{1/2}): Stable
- Isotope mass: 61.928345 Da
- Spin: 0
- Nuclear binding energy: 545262.286±0.434 keV

Nickel-62 is a stable isotope of nickel, having 28 protons and 34 neutrons.

It has the highest binding energy per nucleon of any known nuclide (8.7945 MeV). It is often stated that ^{56}Fe is the "most stable nucleus", but this is because ^{56}Fe has the lowest mass per nucleon, not binding energy per nucleon, of all nuclides. The lower mass per nucleon of ^{56}Fe is possible because ^{56}Fe has 26/56 ≈ 46.43% protons, while ^{62}Ni has only 28/62 ≈ 45.16% protons. Protons are less massive than neutrons, meaning that the larger fraction of protons in ^{56}Fe lowers its mean mass per nucleon without changing its binding energy, which is by definition measured with respect to the actual mix of protons and neutrons in the nucleus (even though free neutrons are unstable.) In other words, nickel-62 can be said to have the 'least massive' protons and neutrons of any isotope.

== Properties ==
The high binding energy of nickel isotopes in general makes nickel an "end product" of many nuclear reactions (including neutron capture reactions) throughout the universe and accounts for the high relative abundance of nickel—although most nickel in space (and possibly produced by supernova explosions) is nickel-58 (the most common isotope) and nickel-60 (the second-most), with the other stable isotopes (nickel-61, nickel-62, and nickel-64) being quite rare. This suggests that most nickel is produced in supernovas in the r-process of neutron capture from nickel-56 immediately after the core-collapse, with any nickel-56 that escapes the supernova explosion rapidly decaying to cobalt-56 and then stable iron-56.

=== Relationship to iron-56 ===
The second and third most tightly bound nuclei are those of ^{58}Fe and ^{56}Fe, with binding energies per nucleon of 8.7922 MeV and 8.7903 MeV, respectively.

As noted above, the isotope ^{56}Fe has the lowest mass per nucleon of any nuclide, 930.412 MeV/c^{2}, followed by ^{62}Ni with 930.417 MeV/c^{2} and ^{60}Ni with 930.420 MeV/c^{2}. This does not contradict the binding energy numbers because ^{62}Ni has a greater proportion of neutrons which are more massive than protons.

The misconception of ^{56}Fe's higher nuclear binding energy probably originated from astrophysics. During nucleosynthesis in stars the competition between photodisintegration and alpha capturing causes more ^{56}Ni to be produced than ^{62}Ni (^{56}Fe is produced later in the star's ejection shell as ^{56}Ni decays). The ^{56}Ni is the natural end product of silicon-burning at the end of a supernova's life and is the product of 14 alpha captures in the alpha process which builds more massive elements in steps of 4 nucleons, from carbon. This alpha process in supernovas burning ends here because of the production of zinc-60, which would be the next step after addition of another "alpha", is unfavorable.

Nonetheless, 28 atoms of nickel-62 fusing into 31 atoms of iron-56 releases 5.7 keV per nucleon; hence the future of an expanding universe without proton decay includes iron stars rather than "nickel stars".

== See also ==
- Isotopes of nickel
