= Coherent potential approximation =

The coherent potential approximation (CPA) is a method, in theoretical physics, of finding the averaged Green's function of an inhomogeneous (or disordered) system. The Green's function obtained via the CPA then describes an effective medium whose scattering properties represent the averaged scattering properties of the disordered system being approximated. It is often described as the 'best' single-site theory for obtaining the averaged Green's function. It is perhaps most famous for its use in describing the physical properties of alloys and disordered magnetic systems, although it is also a useful concept in understanding how sound waves scatter in a material which displays spatial inhomogeneity. The coherent potential approximation was first described by Paul Soven, and its application in the context of calculations of the electronic structure of materials was pioneered by Balász Győrffy.

== Electronic structure (KKR-CPA) ==
In the context of calculations of the electronic structure of materials, the coherent potential approximation is frequently combined with the Korringa–Kohn–Rostoker (KKR) formulation of density functional theory (DFT) to describe the electronic structure of systems with lattice-based disorder, such as substitutional alloys and magnetic materials at finite temperature. The KKR formulation of DFT is also sometimes referred to as multiple scattering theory (MST). When the KKR formulation of DFT is combined with the CPA, it is sometimes referred to as the KKR-CPA.

The KKR formulation of DFT rephrases the usual eigenvalue-eigenvector problem (i.e. solving some effective Schrödinger equation) into an electronic scattering problem. It does so by partitioning the one-electron potential of DFT into a collection of spatially-localised potentials around each ionic site, before considering an electron propagating through the system and scattering from these localised potentials. In this manner, the Green's function of the system is obtained. In a system where there is lattice-based disorder (for example, in a substitutional alloy) the CPA provides a means by which to average multiple potentials associated with a single lattice site and obtain an average Green's function (and consequent electron density) in a physically meaningful way. Although the approach was originally formulated for potentials described within either the muffin tin or atomic sphere approximations (where the spatially localised potential is assumed spherically symmetric) it is now commonplace to use so-called full-potential calculations, where the one-electron potential can have arbitrary spatial dependence.

The KKR-CPA has been used with success to study the physics of a variety of alloy systems, including those where disorder is only present on one sub-lattice (the 'inhomogeneous' CPA). In addition, it has been shown that the CPA can very effectively describe magnetism at finite temperature, by considering (weighted) averages taken over all possible spin orientations. This is referred to as the 'disordered local moment' (DLM) picture and can be used to describe the ferromagnetic phase transition in metals.

=== Treatment of systems with short-range order: non-local CPA ===
The conventional KKR-CPA is a single-site theory and assumes a fully disordered alloy (or equivalent) by considering self-consistently the embedding of a single atom in the uniform effective medium. However, many alloys exhibit at least some level of atomic short-range order (ASRO). To account for such systems, the non-local coherent potential approximation (NL-CPA) was developed, which instead considers the self-consistent embedding of a cluster of atoms in the effective medium. It can be used to describe both the electronic structure and physical properties, e.g. transport properties of alloys with atomic short-range order. It has also been generalised to arbitrary alloy systems with multiple lattice sites per unit cell.
