= Norman Rostoker =

Canadian plasma physicist (1925–2014)

- Born: August 16, 1925; Toronto Ontario, Canada
- Died: December 25, 2014 (aged 89); Irvine, California, U.S.
- Education: University of Toronto (Masters); Carnegie Institute of Technology (D.Sc.)
- Known for: Korringa–Kohn–Rostoker method Co-founder, TAE Technologies
- Spouse: Helen Corinne Rostoker
- Children: Stephen Rostoker; Ruth Forton; Linda Rostoker; Rachel Uchizono
- Awards: James Clerk Maxwell Prize for Plasma Physics (1988)
- Scientific career
- Fields: Plasma physics
- Doctoral students: Tom O'Neil; Peter A. Amendt

Norman Rostoker (August 16, 1925 – December 25, 2014) was a Canadian plasma physicist known for being a pioneer in developing clean plasma-based fusion energy. He co-founded TAE Technologies (formerly known as Tri Alpha Energy) in 1998 and held 27 U.S. Patents on plasma-based fusion accelerators.

The Korringa–Kohn–Rostoker method, a theory in solid-state physics, is named after him.

== Early life and career ==
Rostoker studied at the University of Toronto, where he received his master's degree in physics in 1947, and received his doctorate in 1950 at the Carnegie Institute of Technology, where he did research from 1948. From 1953 to 1956, he was at the Armor Research Foundation and from 1956 to 1967 at General Atomics in San Diego, from 1965 as manager for fusion and plasma physics projects. He was also a professor at the University of California, San Diego from 1962 to 1965. From 1967, he was an IBM Professor of Engineering at Cornell University, where he headed the Faculty of Applied Physics from 1967 to 1970. There, he was one of the founders of the laboratory for pulsed electron and ion beams. From 1973, he was professor of physics at the University of California, Irvine, where he headed the faculty of physics from 1973 to 1976. He was Professor Emeritus there since 2007.

== Scientific contributions ==
Initially, Rostoker dealt with explosives and shaped charges, band theory and nuclear reactors, but turned to plasma physics around 1958. His research included the physics of high intensity ion beams, nonlinear plasma properties, and high density pinch plasma confinement devices.

Rostoker pursued alternative concepts for civil nuclear fusion using particle accelerator technologies and the concepts of magnetized target fusion. In 1998, he was instrumental in founding the then Tri Alpha Energy in the Los Angeles area, which was pursuing the project of a colliding beam fusion reactor. Beams of protons and boron are converted into a plasma state that is held together by magnetic fields that are generated by the flow of particles in a cylindrical plasma itself, which is also known as a field-reversed configuration (FRC). Two such plasmas are then collided at high speed and form a cigar-shaped configuration that is up to 3 m long and 40 cm wide. The use of boron and protons in the fusion plasma does not generate high-energy neutrons like the tokamak. According to Rostoker, neutral particles are then injected tangentially at high speed onto the plasma cloud, which follow orbits at the edge of the plasma and serve as a kind of protection against the cooling of the plasma by escaping particles.

In 2015, Tri Alpha announced the successful maintenance of an FRC plasma over five milliseconds.

== Awards ==
In 1962, Rostoker was elected a fellow of the American Physical Society, and then subsequently awarded the James Clerk Maxwell Prize for Plasma Physics in 1988.

Rostoker was also awarded the UCI Medal by the University of California, Irvine and was inducted into the Russian Academy of Sciences.
