= Tetraneutron =

Hypothesised nuclear physics particle

The tetraneutron is considered an unbound isotope with a lifetime around 10^{−22} seconds. The stability of this cluster of four neutrons is not supported by current models of nuclear forces. Recent empirical evidence is "consistent with a quasi-bound tetraneutron state existing for a very short time".

== Marqués' experiment ==
Francisco-Miguel Marqués and co-workers at the GANIL accelerator in Caen used a particle accelerator to fire atomic nuclei at carbon targets and observed the "spray" of particles from the resulting collisions. In this case the experiment involved firing beryllium-14, boron-15 and lithium-11 nuclei at a small carbon target, the most successful being beryllium-14. This isotope of beryllium has a nuclear halo that consists of four clustered neutrons; this allows it to be easily separated intact in the high-speed collision with the carbon target. Current nuclear models suggest that four separate neutrons should result when beryllium-10 is produced, but the single signal detected in the production of beryllium-10 suggested a multineutron cluster in the breakup products; most likely a beryllium-10 nucleus and four neutrons fused together into a tetraneutron.

A later analysis of the method used in the Marqués' experiment suggested that the detection mechanism was unlikely but the suggestion was refuted, and attempts to reproduce these observations with different methods have not successfully detected any neutron clusters.

== Consequences of hypothetical bound tetraneutrons ==
If, however, the existence of bound tetraneutrons were ever independently confirmed, considerable adjustments would have to be made to current nuclear models. Bertulani and Zelevinsky proposed that, if it existed, the tetraneutron could be formed by a bound state of two dineutron systems. However, attempts to model interactions that might give rise to multineutron clusters have failed, and it "does not seem possible to change modern nuclear Hamiltonians to bind a tetraneutron without destroying many other successful predictions of those Hamiltonians. This means that, should a recent experimental claim of a bound tetraneutron be confirmed, our understanding of nuclear forces will have to be significantly changed." Further work in 2019 suggests potentially observable consequences in neutron star crusts, if the tetraneutron exists.

== Evidence for very short lived resonances ==
In 2016, researchers at RIKEN in Wakō, Japan observed evidence that the tetraneutron exists briefly as a resonance. They fired a beam of neutron-rich helium-8 nuclei (two protons and six neutrons) at a liquid target composed of helium-4 (two protons and two neutrons). Occasionally, the reaction produced beryllium-8 nuclei with four protons and four neutrons, leaving four neutrons unaccounted for. If a four-neutron nucleus did occur, it lasted for about 10^{−21} seconds before decaying into other particles.

Evidence for unbound clusters of 4 neutrons resonances in the disintegration of beryllium-14 nuclei, in ^{8}He-^{8}Be interactions, and collisions of ^{4}He nuclei give an estimated lifetime around 10^{−22} seconds. These discoveries should deepen our understanding of the nuclear forces.

== See also ==
- Neutronium
- Tetraquark
