= Isotopes of carbon =

Isotopes of carbon (_{6}C)
| Main isotopes | | | Decay | |
| Isotope | abundance | half-life (t_{1/2}) | mode | product |
|---|---|---|---|---|
| ^{11}C | synth | 20.34 min | β^{+} | ^{11}B |
| ^{12}C | 98.9% | stable | | |
| ^{13}C | 1.06% | stable | | |
| ^{14}C | trace | 5.70×10^{3} y | β^{−} | ^{14}N |

Standard atomic weight A_{r}°(C)
- [12.0096, 12.0116]; 12.011±0.002 (abridged)

Carbon (_{6}C) has 14 known isotopes, from ^{8}C to ^{20}C as well as ^{22}C, of which only ^{12}C and ^{13}C are stable. The longest-lived radioisotope is ^{14}C, with a half-life of 5700 years. This is also the only carbon radioisotope found in nature, as trace quantities are formed cosmogenically by the reaction ^{14}N + n → ^{14}C + ^{1}H. The most stable artificial radioisotope is ^{11}C, which has a half-life of 20.34 minutes. All other radioisotopes have half-lives under 20 seconds, most less than 200 milliseconds. Lighter isotopes exhibit beta-plus decay into isotopes of boron and heavier ones beta-minus decay into isotopes of nitrogen, though at the limits particle emission occurs as well. The two lightest isotopes decay into helium via short-lived isotopes of lithium, beryllium and boron.

== List of isotopes ==
| Nuclide | Z | N | Isotopic mass (Da) (Note: ( ) – Uncertainty (1σ) is given in concise form in parentheses after the corresponding last digits.) | Discovery year | Half-life [resonance width] | Decay mode (Note: Modes of decay: EC: / Electron capture; n: / Neutron emission; p: / Proton emission) | Daughter isotope (Note: Bold symbol as daughter – Daughter product is stable.) | Spin and parity (Note: ( ) spin value – Indicates spin with weak assignment arguments.) (Note: # – Values marked # are not purely derived from experimental data, but at least partly from trends of neighboring nuclides (TNN).) | Natural abundance (mole fraction) | |
| Nuclide | Z | N | Isotopic mass (Da) | Discovery year | Half-life [resonance width] | Decay mode | Daughter isotope | Spin and parity | Normal proportion | Range of variation |
|---|---|---|---|---|---|---|---|---|---|---|
| ^{8}C | 6 | 2 | 8.037643(20) | 1974 | 3.5(1.4) zs [230(50) keV] | 2p | ^{6}Be (Note: Also immediately emits two protons for the net reaction of ^{8}C → ^{4}He + 4 ^{1}H) | 0+ | | |
| ^{9}C | 6 | 3 | 9.0310372(23) | 1964 | 126.5(9) ms | β^{+} (54.1(1.7)%) | ^{9}B (Note: All three product nuclei are unbound and so the net reaction in each case is ^{9}C → 2 ^{4}He + ^{1}H + e^{+}) | 3/2− | | |
| ^{9}C | 6 | 3 | 9.0310372(23) | 1964 | 126.5(9) ms | β^{+}α (38.4(1.6)%) | ^{5}Li | 3/2− | | |
| ^{9}C | 6 | 3 | 9.0310372(23) | 1964 | 126.5(9) ms | β^{+}p (7.5(6)%) | ^{8}Be | 3/2− | | |
| ^{10}C | 6 | 4 | 10.01685322(8) | 1949 | 19.3011(15) s | β^{+} | ^{10}B | 0+ | | |
| ^{11}C (Note: Used for labeling molecules in PET scans) | 6 | 5 | 11.01143260(6) | 1934 | 20.3402(53) min | β^{+} | ^{11}B | 3/2− | | |
| ^{12}C | 6 | 6 | 12 exactly (Note: The dalton is defined as 1/12 of the mass of an unbound atom of carbon-12 in its ground state.) | 1919 | Stable | | | 0+ | [0.9884, 0.9904] | |
| ^{13}C (Note: Ratio of ^{12}C to ^{13}C used to measure biological productivity in ancient times and differing types of photosynthesis) | 6 | 7 | 13.003354835336(252) | 1929 | Stable | | | 1/2− | [0.0096, 0.0116] | |
| ^{14}C (Note: Has an important use in radiodating (see carbon dating)) | 6 | 8 | 14.003241989(4) | 1936 | 5.70(3)×10^{3} y | β^{−} | ^{14}N | 0+ | Trace (Note: Primarily cosmogenic, produced by neutrons striking atoms of ^{14}N (^{14}N + n → ^{14}C + ^{1}H), <10^{−12}) | |
| ^{15}C | 6 | 9 | 15.0105993(9) | 1950 | 2.449(5) s | β^{−} | ^{15}N | 1/2+ | | |
| ^{16}C | 6 | 10 | 16.014701(4) | 1961 | 750(6) ms | β^{−}n (99.0(3)%) | ^{15}N | 0+ | | |
| ^{16}C | 6 | 10 | 16.014701(4) | 1961 | 750(6) ms | β^{−} (1.0(3)%) | ^{16}N | 0+ | | |
| ^{17}C | 6 | 11 | 17.022579(19) | 1968 | 193(6) ms | β^{−} (71.6(1.3)%) | ^{17}N | 3/2+ | | |
| ^{17}C | 6 | 11 | 17.022579(19) | 1968 | 193(6) ms | β^{−}n (28.4(1.3)%) | ^{16}N | 3/2+ | | |
| ^{17}C | 6 | 11 | 17.022579(19) | 1968 | 193(6) ms | β^{−}2n ? | ^{15}N | 3/2+ | | |
| ^{18}C | 6 | 12 | 18.02675(3) | 1969 | 92(2) ms | β^{−} (68.5(1.5)%) | ^{18}N | 0+ | | |
| ^{18}C | 6 | 12 | 18.02675(3) | 1969 | 92(2) ms | β^{−}n (31.5(1.5)%) | ^{17}N | 0+ | | |
| ^{18}C | 6 | 12 | 18.02675(3) | 1969 | 92(2) ms | β^{−}2n ? | ^{16}N | 0+ | | |
| ^{19}C (Note: Has 1 halo neutron) | 6 | 13 | 19.03480(11) | 1974 | 46.2(2.3) ms | β^{−}n (47(3)%) | ^{18}N | 1/2+ | | |
| ^{19}C | 6 | 13 | 19.03480(11) | 1974 | 46.2(2.3) ms | β^{−} (46.0(4.2)%) | ^{19}N | 1/2+ | | |
| ^{19}C | 6 | 13 | 19.03480(11) | 1974 | 46.2(2.3) ms | β^{−}2n (7(3)%) | ^{17}N | 1/2+ | | |
| ^{20}C | 6 | 14 | 20.04026(25) | 1981 | 16(3) ms | β^{−}n (70(11)%) | ^{19}N | 0+ | | |
| ^{20}C | 6 | 14 | 20.04026(25) | 1981 | 16(3) ms | β^{−}2n (< 18.6%) | ^{18}N | 0+ | | |
| ^{20}C | 6 | 14 | 20.04026(25) | 1981 | 16(3) ms | β^{−} (> 11.4%) | ^{20}N | 0+ | | |
| ^{21}C | 6 | 15 | 21.04900(64)# | (2015) | < 30 ns | n ? | ^{20}C | 1/2+# | | |
| ^{22}C (Note: Has 2 halo neutrons) | 6 | 16 | 22.05755(25) | 1986 | 6.2(1.3) ms | β^{−}n (61(14)%) | ^{21}N | 0+ | | |
| ^{22}C | 6 | 16 | 22.05755(25) | 1986 | 6.2(1.3) ms | β^{−}2n (< 37%) | ^{20}N | 0+ | | |
| ^{22}C | 6 | 16 | 22.05755(25) | 1986 | 6.2(1.3) ms | β^{−} (> 2%) | ^{22}N | 0+ | | |
This table header & footer:

== Carbon-11 ==
Carbon-11 or ^{11}C is a radioactive isotope of carbon that decays to boron-11 with a half-life to 20.34 minutes. This decay mainly occurs due to positron emission, with around 0.19–0.23% of decays instead occurring by electron capture.

^{11}C → ^{11}B + e^{+} + ν_{e} + 0.96 MeV
^{11}C + e^{−} → ^{11}B + ν_{e} + 1.98 MeV

It is produced by hitting nitrogen with protons of around 16.5 MeV in a cyclotron. The causes the endothermic reaction

^{14}N + p → ^{11}C + ^{4}He − 2.92 MeV

It can also be produced by fragmentation of ^{12}C by shooting high-energy ^{12}C at a target.

Carbon-11 is commonly used as a radioisotope for the radioactive labeling of molecules in positron emission tomography. Among the many molecules used in this context are the radioligands [^{11}C]DASB and [^{11}C]Cimbi-5. Due to the short half-life, the chemical reactions used to manipulate the radioisotope as generated and incorporate it into a biomolecule must be efficient. Popular key intermediates include [^{11}C]phosgene, for carboxylation-related reactions, though other synthons, such as [^{11}C]carbonyl fluoride and [^{11}C]carbon dioxide, are also being explored. For methylation, [^{11}C]iodomethane and related synthons are used.

== Stable isotopes ==
Carbon-12 and carbon-13 account for approximately 98.9% and 1.1% (respectively) of the naturally occurring carbon on Earth. However, the ratio of stable ^{13}C and ^{12}C in a material can vary due to differences in precursor source and isotopic fractionation induced by a variety of biogeochemical processes. The quantities of the different isotopes are commonly measured via isotope-ratio mass spectrometry and expressed as parts per thousand (‰ or "per mille") divergence from the ratio of a standard:

$\delta \ce{^{13}C} = \left( \frac{\left( \frac\ce{^{13}C}\ce{^{12}C} \right)_\text{sample}}{\left( \frac\ce{^{13}C}\ce{^{12}C} \right)_\text{standard}} - 1 \right) \times 1000$ ‰

Peedee Belemnite ("PDB"), a fossil belemnite from the eponym Late Cretaceous geological formation in North and South Carolina (USA), was the original reference standard used for standardizing carbon isotope ratio values. Due to the depletion of the original PDB, an artificial "Vienna PDB" standard, or "VPDB", is generally used today.

=== Paleoclimate ===
^{12}C and ^{13}C are measured as the isotope ratio δ^{13}C in benthic foraminifera and used as a proxy for nutrient cycling and the temperature dependent air–sea exchange of CO_{2} (ocean ventilation). Photosynthetic organisms, such as algae and plants find it easier to use the lighter carbon isotope (^{12}C) when they convert carbon dioxide and water into glucose and oxygen using sunlight and photosynthesis:

6 CO_{2} + 6 H_{2}O → C_{6}H_{12}O_{6} + 6 O_{2}

For example, large blooms of plankton (free-floating organisms) absorb large amounts of ^{12}C from the oceans. Originally, the ^{12}C was mostly incorporated into the seawater from the atmosphere. If the oceans that the plankton live in are stratified (meaning that there are layers of warm water near the top, and colder water deeper down), then the surface water does not mix very much with the deeper waters, so that when the plankton dies, it sinks and takes away ^{12}C from the surface, leaving the surface layers relatively rich in ^{13}C. Where cold waters well up from the depths (such as in the North Atlantic), the water carries ^{12}C back up with it; when the ocean was less stratified than today, there was much more ^{12}C in the skeletons of surface-dwelling species. Other indicators of past climate include the presence of tropical species and coral growth rings.

=== Tracing food sources and diets ===
Different photosynthetic pathways preferentially select for the lighter ^{12}C, but their selectivity differs. Grasses in temperate climates (barley, rice, wheat, rye, and oats, plus sunflower, potato, tomatoes, peanuts, cotton, sugar beet, and most trees and their nuts or fruits, roses, and Kentucky bluegrass) follow a C_{3} photosynthetic pathway that will yield δ^{13}C values averaging about −26.5‰. Grasses in hot arid climates (maize in particular, but also millet, sorghum, sugar cane, and crabgrass) follow a C_{4} photosynthetic pathway that produces δ^{13}C values averaging about −12.5‰.

It follows that eating these different plants will affect the δ^{13}C values in the consumer's body tissues. If an animal (or human) eats only C_{3} plants, their δ^{13}C values will be from −18.5 to −22.0‰ in their bone collagen and −14.5‰ in the hydroxylapatite of their teeth and bones.

In contrast, C4 feeders will have bone collagen with a value of −7.5‰ and hydroxylapatite value of −0.5‰.

In case studies, millet and maize eaters can easily be distinguished from rice and wheat eaters. Studying how these dietary preferences are distributed geographically through time can illuminate migration paths of people and dispersal paths of different agricultural crops. However, human groups have often mixed C_{3} and C_{4} plants (historically, northern Chinese subsisted on wheat (C_{3}) and millet (C_{4})) or mixed plant and animal groups (for example, southeastern Chinese subsisting on rice and fish).

== Carbon-14 ==
Carbon-14 (also called radiocarbon) occurs in trace amounts and has a half-life of 5730 years. The primary source of ^{14}C on Earth is the reaction of ^{14}N with thermal neutrons from cosmic radiation spallation reactions in the upper atmosphere; this mixes throughout the atmosphere, and biological processes such as photosynthesis incorporate the ^{14}C into living organisms. Since organisms stop absorbing ^{14}C upon dying, measurement of the amount of ^{14}C in a sample may be used to estimate its age. This technique, called radiocarbon dating, is one of the principal methods of radiometric dating in archaeology.

== See also ==
- Cosmogenic isotopes
- Environmental isotopes
- Isotopic signature
- Radiocarbon dating

Daughter products other than carbon

- Isotopes of nitrogen
- Isotopes of boron
- Isotopes of beryllium
- Isotopes of lithium
