= Borromean nucleus =

Atomic nucleus of three bound components with no paired binding

In nuclear physics, a Borromean nucleus is an atomic nucleus comprising three bound components in which any subsystem of two components is unbound. This has the consequence that if one component is removed, the remaining two comprise an unbound resonance, so that the original nucleus is split into three parts.

The name is derived from the Borromean rings, a system of three linked rings in which no pair of rings is linked.

== Examples of Borromean nuclei ==
Many Borromean nuclei are light nuclei near the nuclear drip lines that have a nuclear halo and low nuclear binding energy. For example, the nuclei ^{6}He, ^{11}Li, and ^{22}C each have a two-neutron halo surrounding a core containing the remaining nucleons. These are Borromean nuclei because the removal of either neutron from the halo will result in a resonance unbound to one-neutron emission, whereas the dineutron (the particles in the halo) is itself an unbound system. Similarly, ^{17}Ne is a Borromean nucleus with a two-proton halo; both the diproton and ^{16}F are unbound.

Also, stable ^{9}Be is a Borromean nucleus comprising two alpha particles and a neutron; the removal of any one component would produce one of the unbound resonances ^{5}He or ^{8}Be.

Several Borromean nuclei such as ^{9}Be and the Hoyle state (an excited resonance in ^{12}C) play an important role in nuclear astrophysics. Namely, these are three-body systems whose unbound components (formed from ^{4}He) are intermediate steps in the triple-alpha process; this limits the rate of production of heavier elements, for three bodies must react nearly simultaneously.

Borromean nuclei made of more than three components can also exist. These also lie along the drip lines; for instance, ^{8}He and ^{14}Be are five-body Borromean systems with a four-neutron halo. It is also possible that nuclides produced in the alpha process (such as ^{12}C and ^{16}O) may be clusters of alpha particles, having a similar structure to Borromean nuclei.

As of 2012, the heaviest known Borromean nucleus was ^{29}F. Heavier species along the neutron drip line have since been observed; these and undiscovered heavier nuclei along the drip line are also likely to be Borromean nuclei with varying numbers (3, 5, 7, or more) of bodies.

== See also ==
- Efimov state
- Three-body force
- Halo nucleus
