= Isotopes of boron =

Isotopes of boron (_{5}B)
Main isotopes			Decay	
Isotope	abundance	half-life (t_{1/2})	mode	product
^{8}B	synth	771.9 ms	β^{+}	^{8}Be
^{10}B	[18.9%, 20.4%]	stable		
^{11}B	[79.6%, 81.1%]	stable		

Standard atomic weight A_{r}°(B)
- [10.806, 10.821]; 10.81±0.02 (abridged)

Boron (_{5}B) naturally occurs as isotopes ^{10}B and ^{11}B, the latter of which makes up about 80% of natural boron. There are 13 radioisotopes that have been discovered, with mass numbers from 7 to 21, all with short half-lives, the longest being that of ^{8}B, with a half-life of only 771.9(9) ms and ^{12}B with a half-life of 20.20(2) ms. All other isotopes have half-lives shorter than 17.35 ms. Those isotopes with mass below 10 decay into helium via short-lived isotopes of beryllium while those with mass above 11 mostly become carbon.

== List of isotopes ==
Nuclide	Z	N	Isotopic mass (Da) (Note: ( ) – Uncertainty (1σ) is given in concise form in parentheses after the corresponding last digits.)	Discovery year	Half-life [resonance width]	Decay mode (Note: Modes of decay: n: / Neutron emission; p: / Proton emission)	Daughter isotope (Note: Bold symbol as daughter – Daughter product is stable.)	Spin and parity (Note: ( ) spin value – Indicates spin with weak assignment arguments.) (Note: # – Values marked # are not purely derived from experimental data, but at least partly from trends of neighboring nuclides (TNN).)	Natural abundance (mole fraction)	
Nuclide	Z	N	Isotopic mass (Da)	Discovery year	Half-life [resonance width]	Decay mode	Daughter isotope	Spin and parity	Normal proportion	Range of variation
^{7}B	5	2	7.029712(27)	1967	570(14) ys [801(20) keV]	p	^{6}Be (Note: Subsequently decays by double proton emission to ^{4}He for a net reaction of ^{7}B → ^{4}He + 3 ^{1}H)	(3/2−)		
^{8}B (Note: Has 1 halo proton) (Note: Intermediate product of a branch of proton–proton chain in stellar nucleosynthesis as part of the process converting hydrogen to helium)	5	3	8.0246073(11)	1950	771.9(9) ms	β^{+}	^{8}Be (Note: Immediately decays into two α particles, for a net reaction of ^{8}B → 2 ^{4}He + e^{+})	2+		
^{9}B	5	4	9.0133296(10)	1940	800(300) zs	p	^{8}Be (Note: Immediately decays into two α particles, for a net reaction of ^{9}B → 2 ^{4}He + ^{1}H)	3/2−		
^{10}B (Note: One of the few stable odd-odd nuclei)	5	5	10.012936862(16)	1920	Stable			3+	[0.189, 0.204]	
^{11}B	5	6	11.009305167(13)	1920	Stable			3/2−	[0.796, 0.811]	
^{12}B	5	7	12.0143526(14)	1935	20.20(2) ms	β^{−} (99.40(2)%)	^{12}C	1+		
^{12}B	5	7	12.0143526(14)	1935	20.20(2) ms	β^{−}α (0.60(2)%)	^{8}Be (Note: Immediately decays into two α particles, for a net reaction of ^{12}B → 3 ^{4}He + e^{−})	1+		
^{13}B	5	8	13.0177800(11)	1956	17.16(18) ms	β^{−} (99.734(36)%)	^{13}C	3/2−		
^{13}B	5	8	13.0177800(11)	1956	17.16(18) ms	β^{−}n (0.266(36)%)	^{12}C	3/2−		
^{14}B	5	9	14.025404(23)	1966	12.36(29) ms	β^{−} (93.96(23)%)	^{14}C	2−		
^{14}B	5	9	14.025404(23)	1966	12.36(29) ms	β^{−}n (6.04(23)%)	^{13}C	2−		
^{14}B	5	9	14.025404(23)	1966	12.36(29) ms	β^{−}2n ? (Note: Decay mode shown is energetically allowed, but has not been experimentally observed to occur in this nuclide.)	^{12}C	2−		
^{15}B	5	10	15.031087(23)	1966	10.18(35) ms	β^{−}n (98.7(1.0)%)	^{14}C	3/2−		
^{15}B	5	10	15.031087(23)	1966	10.18(35) ms	β^{−} (< 1.3%)	^{15}C	3/2−		
^{15}B	5	10	15.031087(23)	1966	10.18(35) ms	β^{−}2n (< 1.5%)	^{13}C	3/2−		
^{16}B	5	11	16.039841(26)	2000	> 4.6 zs	n ?	^{15}B	0−		
^{17}B (Note: Has 2 halo neutrons)	5	12	17.04693(22)	1973	5.08(5) ms	β^{−}n (63(1)%)	^{16}C	(3/2−)		
^{17}B	5	12	17.04693(22)	1973	5.08(5) ms	β^{−} (21.1(2.4)%)	^{17}C	(3/2−)		
^{17}B	5	12	17.04693(22)	1973	5.08(5) ms	β^{−}2n (12(2)%)	^{15}C	(3/2−)		
^{17}B	5	12	17.04693(22)	1973	5.08(5) ms	β^{−}3n (3.5(7)%)	^{14}C	(3/2−)		
^{17}B	5	12	17.04693(22)	1973	5.08(5) ms	β^{−}4n (0.4(3)%)	^{13}C	(3/2−)		
^{18}B	5	13	18.05560(22)	2010	< 26 ns	n	^{17}B	(2−)		
^{19}B (Note: Has 4 halo neutrons)	5	14	19.06417(56)	1984	2.92(13) ms	β^{−}n (71(9)%)	^{18}C	(3/2−)		
^{19}B	5	14	19.06417(56)	1984	2.92(13) ms	β^{−}2n (17(5)%)	^{17}C	(3/2−)		
^{19}B	5	14	19.06417(56)	1984	2.92(13) ms	β^{−}3n (< 9.1%)	^{16}C	(3/2−)		
^{19}B	5	14	19.06417(56)	1984	2.92(13) ms	β^{−} (> 2.9%)	^{19}C	(3/2−)		
^{20}B	5	15	20.07451(59)	2018	> 912.4 ys	n	^{19}B	(1−, 2−)		
^{21}B	5	16	21.08415(60)	2018	> 760 ys	2n	^{19}B	(3/2−)		
This table header & footer:

== Boron-8 ==
Boron-8 is an isotope of boron that undergoes β^{+} decay to beryllium-8 with a half-life of 771.9(9) ms. It is the strongest candidate for a halo nucleus with a loosely-bound proton, in contrast to neutron halo nuclei such as lithium-11.

Although boron-8 beta decay neutrinos from the Sun make up only about 80 ppm of the total solar neutrino flux, they have a higher energy centered around 10 MeV, and are an important background to dark matter direct detection experiments. They are the first component of the neutrino floor that dark matter direct detection experiments are expected to eventually encounter.

== Applications ==
=== Boron-10 ===
Boron-10 is used in boron neutron capture therapy as an experimental treatment of some brain cancers.

== See also ==
Daughter products other than boron

- Isotopes of carbon
- Isotopes of beryllium
- Isotopes of helium
