= Isotopes of hydrogen =

Isotopes of hydrogen (_{1}H)
Main isotopes			Decay	
Isotope	abundance	half-life (t_{1/2})	mode	product
^{1}H	99.9855%	stable		
^{2}H	0.0115%	stable		
^{3}H	trace	12.32 y	β^{−}	^{3}He
Abundance of deuterium is highly variable

Standard atomic weight A_{r}°(H)
- [1.00784, 1.00811]; 1.0080±0.0002 (abridged)

Hydrogen (_{1}H) has three naturally occurring isotopes: ^{1}H, ^{2}H, and ^{3}H. ^{1}H and ^{2}H are stable, while ^{3}H has a half-life of 12.32 years. (Note: NUBASE2020 uses the tropical year to convert between years and other units of time, not the Gregorian year. The relationship between years and other time units in NUBASE2020 is as follows: 1 y = 365.2422 d = 31 556 926 s) Heavier isotopes also exist; all are synthetic and have a half-life of less than 1 zeptosecond (10^{−21} s).

Hydrogen is the only element whose isotopes have different names that remain in common use today: ^{2}H is deuterium and ^{3}H is tritium. The symbols D and T are sometimes used for deuterium and tritium; IUPAC (International Union of Pure and Applied Chemistry) accepts said symbols, but recommends the standard isotopic symbols ^{2}H and ^{3}H, to avoid confusion in alphabetic sorting of chemical formulas. ^{1}H, with no neutrons, may be called protium to disambiguate. During the early study of radioactivity, some other heavy radioisotopes were given names, but such names are rarely used today.

The three most stable isotopes of hydrogen: protium (A = 1), deuterium (A = 2), and tritium (A = 3)

== List of isotopes ==
Nuclide	Z	N	Isotopic mass (Da) (Note: ( ) – Uncertainty (1σ) is given in concise form in parentheses after the corresponding last digits.)	Discovery year	Half-life	Decay mode (Note: Modes of decay: n: / Neutron emission)	Daughter isotope (Note: Bold symbol as daughter – Daughter product is stable.)	Spin and parity (Note: ( ) spin value – Indicates spin with weak assignment arguments.) (Note: # – Values marked # are not purely derived from experimental data, but at least partly from trends of neighboring nuclides (TNN).)	Natural abundance (mole fraction)	
Nuclide	Z	N	Isotopic mass (Da)	Discovery year	Half-life	Decay mode	Daughter isotope	Spin and parity	Normal proportion	Range of variation
^{1}H	1	0	1.007825031898(14)	1918	Stable (Note: Unless proton decay occurs; this and ^{3}He are the only stable nuclides with more protons than neutrons.)			1/2+	[0.99972, 0.99999]	
^{2}H (Note: Produced in Big Bang nucleosynthesis; one of the few stable odd–odd nuclei.)	1	1	2.014101777844(15)	1932	Stable			1+	[0.00001, 0.00028]	
^{3}H (Note: Produced in Big Bang nucleosynthesis, but its short life ensures that none today is primordial, and all then formed should have decayed to ^{3}He.)	1	2	3.016049281320(81)	1934	12.32(2) y	β^{−}	^{3}He	1/2+	trace (Note: Cosmogenic, also sometimes released from nuclear power plant cooling water.)	
^{4}H	1	3	4.02643(11)	1981	139(10)×10^{−24} s	n	^{3}H	2−		
^{5}H	1	4	5.03531(10)	2001	86(6)×10^{−24} s	2n	^{3}H	(1/2+)		
^{6}H	1	5	6.04496(27)	1984	294(67)×10^{−24} s			2−#		
^{7}H	1	6	7.052750(108)#	2003	652(558)×10^{−24} s			1/2+#		
This table header & footer:

== Hydrogen-1 (protium) ==
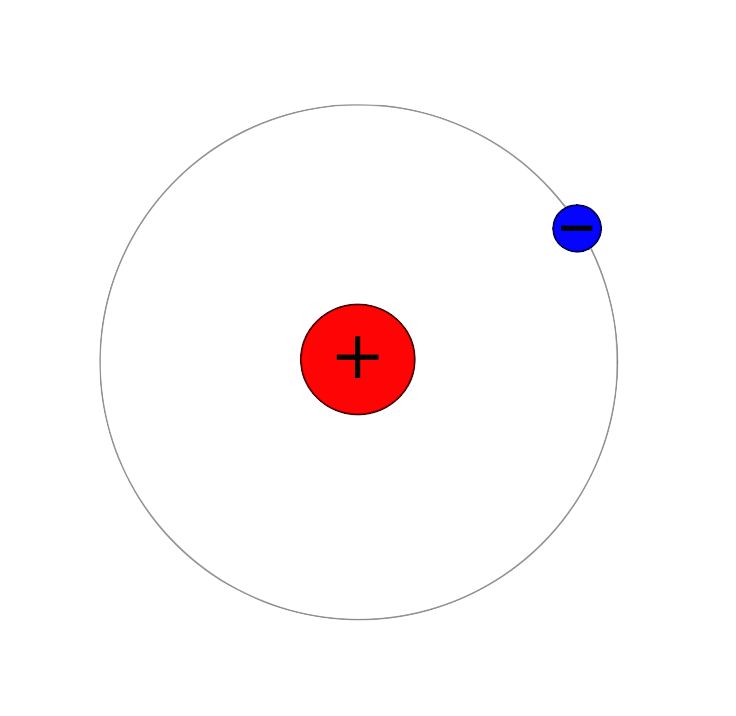
^{1}H consists of 1 proton and 1 electron: the only stable nuclide with no neutrons (see diproton for a discussion of why no others exist).

^{1}H (atomic mass 1.007825031898(14) Da) is the most common hydrogen isotope, with an abundance of > 99.98%. Its nucleus consists of only a single proton, so it has the formal name protium.

The proton has never been observed to decay, so ^{1}H is considered stable. It is the only stable nuclide with no neutrons. Some Grand Unified Theories proposed in the 1970s predict that proton decay can occur with a half-life between 10^{28} and 10^{36} years. If so, then ^{1}H (and all nuclei now believed to be stable) are only observationally stable. As of 2018, experiments have shown that the mean lifetime of the proton is > 3.6×10^{29} years.

== Hydrogen-2 (deuterium) ==
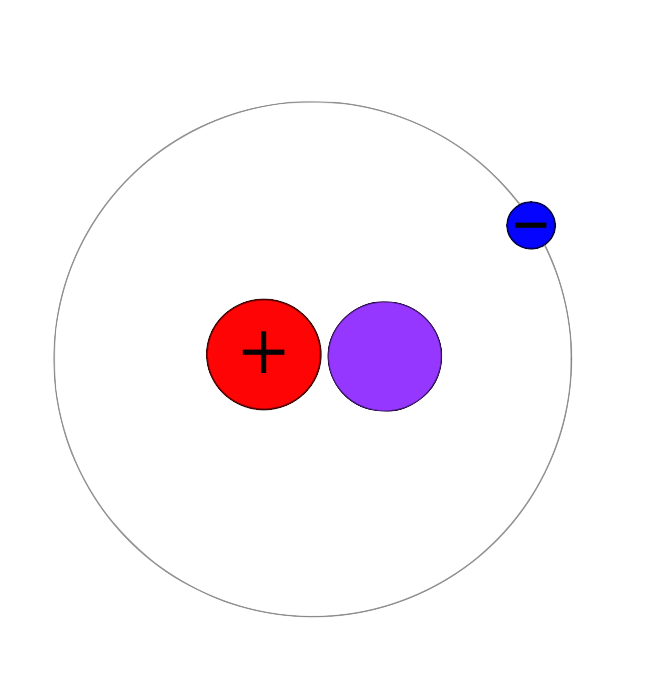
Deuterium consists of 1 proton, 1 neutron, and 1 electron.

Deuterium, ^{2}H (atomic mass 2.014101777844(15) Da), the other stable hydrogen isotope, has one proton and one neutron in its nucleus, called a deuteron. ^{2}H comprises 26–184 ppm (by population, not mass) of hydrogen on Earth; the lower number tends to be found in hydrogen gas and higher enrichment (150 ppm) is typical of seawater. Deuterium on Earth has been enriched with respect to its initial concentration in the Big Bang and outer Solar System (≈ 27 ppm, atom fraction) and older parts of the Milky Way (≈ 23 ppm). Presumably the differential concentration of deuterium in the inner Solar System is due to the lower volatility of deuterium gas and compounds, enriching deuterium fractions in comets and planets exposed to significant heat from the Sun over billions of years of Solar System evolution.

Deuterium is not radioactive, and is not a significant toxicity hazard. Water enriched in ^{2}H is called heavy water. Deuterium and its compounds are used as a non-radioactive label in chemical experiments and in solvents for ^{1}H-nuclear magnetic resonance spectroscopy. Heavy water is used as a neutron moderator and coolant for nuclear reactors. Deuterium is also a potential fuel for commercial nuclear fusion.

== Hydrogen-3 (tritium) ==
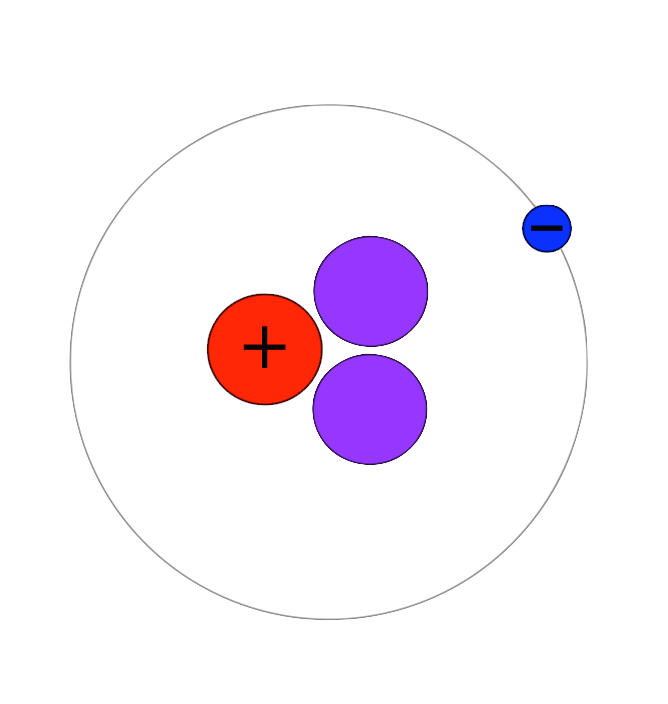
Tritium consists of 1 proton, 2 neutrons, and 1 electron.

Tritium, ^{3}H (atomic mass 3.016049281320(81) Da), has one proton and two neutrons in its nucleus (called a triton). It is radioactive, β^{−} decaying into helium-3 with half-life 12.32 years. Traces of ^{3}H occur naturally due to cosmic rays interacting with atmospheric gases. ^{3}H has also been released in nuclear tests. It is used in fusion bombs, as a tracer in isotope geochemistry, and in self-powered lighting devices.

The most common way to produce ^{3}H is to bombard a natural isotope of lithium, ^{6}Li, with neutrons in a nuclear reactor.

Tritium can be used in chemical and biological labeling experiments as a radioactive tracer. Deuterium–tritium fusion uses ^{2}H and ^{3}H as its main reactants, giving energy through the loss of mass when the two nuclei collide and fuse at high temperatures.

== Hydrogen-4 ==
^{4}H (atomic mass 4.02643(11) Da), with one proton and three neutrons, is a highly unstable isotope. It has been synthesized in the laboratory by bombarding tritium with fast-moving deuterons; the triton captured a neutron from the deuteron. The presence of ^{4}H was deduced by detecting the emitted protons. It decays by neutron emission into ^{3}H with a half-life of 139(10) ys (1.39(10)×10^{−22} s).

In the 1955 satirical novel The Mouse That Roared, the name quadium was given to the ^{4}H that powered the Q-bomb that the Duchy of Grand Fenwick captured from the United States.

== Hydrogen-5 ==
^{5}H (atomic mass 5.03531(10) Da), with one proton and four neutrons, is highly unstable. It has been synthesized in the lab by bombarding tritium with fast-moving tritons; one triton captures two neutrons from the other, becoming a nucleus with one proton and four neutrons. The remaining proton may be detected, and the existence of ^{5}H deduced. It decays by double neutron emission into ^{3}H and has a half-life of 86(6) ys (8.6(6)×10^{−23} s) – the shortest half-life of any known nuclide.

== Hydrogen-6 ==
^{6}H (atomic mass 6.04496(27) Da) has one proton and five neutrons. It has a half-life of 294(67) ys (2.94(67)×10^{−22} s). In 2025, ^{6}H was produced using an 855 MeV electron beam impinging upon on a ^{7}Li target.

== Hydrogen-7 ==
^{7}H (atomic mass 7.05275(108) Da) has one proton and six neutrons. It was first synthesized in 2003 by a group of Russian, Japanese and French scientists at Riken's Radioactive Isotope Beam Factory by bombarding hydrogen with helium-8 atoms; all six of the helium-8's neutrons were donated to the hydrogen nucleus. The two remaining protons were detected by the "Riken telescope", a device made of several layers of sensors, positioned behind the target of the RI Beam cyclotron. ^{7}H has a half-life of 652(558) ys (6.52(558)×10^{−22} s).

== Decay chains ==
^{4}H and ^{5}H decay directly to ^{3}H, which then decays to stable ^{3}He. Decay of the heaviest isotopes, ^{6}H and ^{7}H, has not been experimentally observed.
$$\begin{array}{rcl}\\
\ce{^3_1H} &\ce{->[12.32\ \ce{y}]} &\ce{{^3_2He} + e^-} \\
\ce{^4_1H} &\ce{->[139\ \ce{ys}]} &\ce{{^3_1H} + {^1_0n}} \\
\ce{^5_1H} &\ce{->[86\ \ce{ys}]} &\ce{{^3_1H} + {2^1_0n}} \\{}
\end{array}$$

Decay times are in yoctoseconds (10^{−24} s) for all these isotopes except ^{3}H, which is in years.

== See also ==
- Hydrogen atom
- Hydrogen isotope biogeochemistry
- Hydrogen-4.1 (Muonic helium)
- Muonium – acts like an exotic light isotope of hydrogen
- Media related to Isotopes of hydrogen at Wikimedia Commons
