= Isotopes of nitrogen =

Isotopes of nitrogen (_{7}N)
Main isotopes			Decay	
Isotope	abundance	half-life (t_{1/2})	mode	product
^{13}N	trace	9.965 min	β^{+}	^{13}C
^{14}N	99.6%	stable		
^{15}N	0.380%	stable		
^{16}N	synth	7.13 s	β^{−}	^{16}O
^{16}N	synth	7.13 s	β^{−}α<0.01%	^{12}C

Standard atomic weight A_{r}°(N)
- [14.00643, 14.00728]; 14.007±0.001 (abridged)

Natural nitrogen (_{7}N) consists of two stable isotopes: the vast majority (99.62%) of naturally occurring nitrogen is nitrogen-14, with the remainder (0.38%) being nitrogen-15. Thirteen radioisotopes are also known, with atomic masses ranging from 9 to 23, along with three nuclear isomers. All of these radioisotopes are short-lived, the longest-lived being ^{13}N with a half-life of 9.965 minutes. All of the others have half-lives shorter than ten seconds. Isotopes lighter than the stable ones generally decay to isotopes of carbon, and those heavier beta decay to isotopes of oxygen.

Nitrogen-13 is a positron emitter and one of the main isotopes used in medical PET scans.

== List of isotopes ==
Nuclide (Note: ^{m}N – Excited nuclear isomer.)	Z	N	Isotopic mass (Da) (Note: ( ) – Uncertainty (1σ) is given in concise form in parentheses after the corresponding last digits.) (Note: # – Atomic mass marked #: value and uncertainty derived not from purely experimental data, but at least partly from trends from the Mass Surface (TMS).)	Discovery year	Half-life [resonance width]	Decay mode (Note: Modes of decay: IT: / Isomeric transition; n: / Neutron emission; p: / Proton emission)	Daughter isotope (Note: Bold symbol as daughter – Daughter product is stable.)	Spin and parity (Note: ( ) spin value – Indicates spin with weak assignment arguments.) (Note: # – Values marked # are not purely derived from experimental data, but at least partly from trends of neighboring nuclides (TNN).)	Natural abundance (mole fraction)	
Nuclide	Excitation energy			Discovery year	Half-life [resonance width]	Decay mode	Daughter isotope	Spin and parity	Normal proportion	Range of variation
^{9}N	7	2		2023	<1 as	p (Note: Decays by proton emission to ^{8}C, which immediately emits two protons to form ^{6}Be, which in turn emits two protons to form stable ^{4}He)	^{8}C			
^{10}N	7	3	10.04165(43)	2002	143(36) ys	p ?	^{9}C	1−, 2−		
^{11}N	7	4	11.026158(5)	1974	585(7) ys [780.0(9.3) keV]	p	^{10}C	1/2+		
^{12}N	7	5	12.0186132(11)	1949	11.000(16) ms	β^{+} (98.07(4)%)	^{12}C	1+		
^{12}N	7	5	12.0186132(11)	1949	11.000(16) ms	β^{+}α (1.93(4)%)	^{8}Be (Note: Immediately decays into two alpha particles for a net reaction of ^{12}N → 3 ^{4}He + e^{+}.)	1+		
^{13}N	7	6	13.00573861(29)	1934	9.965(4) min	β^{+}	^{13}C	1/2−	trace	
^{14}N	7	7	14.003074004251(241)	1920	Stable			1+	[0.99578, 0.99663]	
^{15}N	7	8	15.000108898266(625)	1929	Stable			1/2−	[0.00337, 0.00422]	
^{16}N	7	9	16.0061019(25)	1933	7.13(2) s	β^{−} (99.99846(5)%)	^{16}O	2−		
^{16}N	7	9	16.0061019(25)	1933	7.13(2) s	β^{−}α (0.00154(5)%)	^{12}C	2−		
^{16m}N	120.42(12) keV			1957	5.25(6) μs	IT (99.999611(25)%)	^{16}N	0−		
^{16m}N	120.42(12) keV			1957	5.25(6) μs	β^{−} (0.000389(25)%)	^{16}O	0−		
^{17}N	7	10	17.008449(16)	1949	4.173(4) s	β^{−}n (95.1(7)%)	^{16}O	1/2−		
^{17}N	7	10	17.008449(16)	1949	4.173(4) s	β^{−} (4.9(7)%)	^{17}O	1/2−		
^{17}N	7	10	17.008449(16)	1949	4.173(4) s	β^{−}α (0.0025(4)%)	^{13}C	1/2−		
^{18}N	7	11	18.014078(20)	1964	619.2(1.9) ms	β^{−} (80.8(1.6)%)	^{18}O	1−		
^{18}N	7	11	18.014078(20)	1964	619.2(1.9) ms	β^{−}α (12.2(6)%)	^{14}C	1−		
^{18}N	7	11	18.014078(20)	1964	619.2(1.9) ms	β^{−}n (7.0(1.5)%)	^{17}O	1−		
^{18}N	7	11	18.014078(20)	1964	619.2(1.9) ms	β^{−}2n ?	^{16}O	1−		
^{19}N	7	12	19.017022(18)	1968	336(3) ms	β^{−} (58.2(9)%)	^{19}O	1/2−		
^{19}N	7	12	19.017022(18)	1968	336(3) ms	β^{−}n (41.8(9)%)	^{18}O	1/2−		
^{20}N	7	13	20.023370(80)	1969	136(3) ms	β^{−} (57.1(1.4)%)	^{20}O	(2−)		
^{20}N	7	13	20.023370(80)	1969	136(3) ms	β^{−}n (42.9(1.4)%)	^{19}O	(2−)		
^{20}N	7	13	20.023370(80)	1969	136(3) ms	β^{−}2n ?	^{18}O	(2−)		
^{21}N	7	14	21.02709(14)	1970	85(5) ms	β^{−}n (87(3)%)	^{20}O	(1/2−)		
^{21}N	7	14	21.02709(14)	1970	85(5) ms	β^{−} (13(3)%)	^{21}O	(1/2−)		
^{21}N	7	14	21.02709(14)	1970	85(5) ms	β^{−}2n ?	^{19}O	(1/2−)		
^{22}N	7	15	22.03410(22)	1979	23(3) ms	β^{−} (54.0(4.2)%)	^{22}O	0−#		
^{22}N	7	15	22.03410(22)	1979	23(3) ms	β^{−}n (34(3)%)	^{21}O	0−#		
^{22}N	7	15	22.03410(22)	1979	23(3) ms	β^{−}2n (12(3)%)	^{20}O	0−#		
^{23}N (Note: Heaviest particle-bound isotope of nitrogen, see Nuclear drip line)	7	16	23.03942(45)	1985	13.9(1.4) ms	β^{−} (> 46.6(7.2)%)	^{23}O	1/2−#		
^{23}N	7	16	23.03942(45)	1985	13.9(1.4) ms	β^{−}n (42(6)%)	^{22}O	1/2−#		
^{23}N	7	16	23.03942(45)	1985	13.9(1.4) ms	β^{−}2n (8(4)%)	^{21}O	1/2−#		
^{23}N	7	16	23.03942(45)	1985	13.9(1.4) ms	β^{−}3n (< 3.4%)	^{20}O	1/2−#		
^{24}N	7	17	24.05039(43)#	(2018)	< 52 ns	n ?	^{23}N			
^{25}N	7	18	25.06010(54)#	(2018)	< 260 ns	n ?	^{24}N	1/2−#		
^{25}N	7	18	25.06010(54)#	(2018)	< 260 ns	2n ?	^{23}N	1/2−#		
This table header & footer:

== Nitrogen-13 ==
Nitrogen-13 (^{13}N) has a half-life of a little under ten minutes. It is produced in the atmosphere when gamma rays (for example from lightning) knock neutrons out of nitrogen-14.

^{13}N decays to ^{13}C, emitting a positron. The positron quickly annihilates with an electron, producing two gamma rays of about 511 keV. After a lightning bolt, this gamma radiation dies down with a half-life of 10 minutes, but these low-energy gamma rays go on average only about 90 metres through the air, so they may only be detected for a minute or so as the "cloud" of ^{13}N and ^{15}O floats by, carried by the wind.

Nitrogen-13 plays a significant role in the CNO cycle, which is the dominant source of energy in main sequence stars more massive than 1.5 times the mass of the Sun.

Nitrogen-13 is used in positron emission tomography in the form of ^{13}N-labelled ammonia, for example for myocardial perfusion imaging. It can be produced with a medical cyclotron, using a target of pure water with a trace amount of ethanol. The reactants are oxygen-16 (present as H_{2}O) and a proton, and the products are nitrogen-13 and an alpha particle (helium-4):

^{1}H + ^{16}O → ^{13}N + ^{4}He

In this endothermic reaction, the proton must be accelerated to have a total energy greater than 5.66 MeV. The presence of ethanol allows the formation of ammonia as nitrogen-13 is produced. Other routes of producing ^{13}N-labelled ammonia exist, some of which facilitate co-generation of other light radionuclides for diagnostic imaging.

== Nitrogen-14 ==
Nitrogen-14 makes up the clear majority of natural nitrogen, about 99.62%, and is responsible for the Earth's stable atmosphere.

Nitrogen-14 is one of the very few stable nuclides with both an odd number of protons and of neutrons (seven each) and is the only one to make up a majority of its element. Unpaired protons or neutrons contribute a half-integer nuclear spin, which in this case is a spin 1/2 orbital, giving the nucleus a total magnetic spin of one (as the spins prefer to align).

The original source of nitrogen-14 and nitrogen-15 in the Universe is believed to be stellar nucleosynthesis, where they are produced as part of the CNO cycle.

Nitrogen-14 is the source of naturally occurring, radioactive, carbon-14. Some kinds of cosmic radiation cause a nuclear reaction with nitrogen-14 in the upper atmosphere of the Earth, creating carbon-14, which decays back to nitrogen-14 with a half-life of 5700 years.

== Nitrogen-15 ==
Nitrogen-15 is a rare stable isotope of nitrogen, comprising about 0.38%. Nitrogen-15 presents one of the lowest thermal neutron capture cross sections of all isotopes.

Nitrogen-15 is frequently used in NMR (Nitrogen-15 NMR spectroscopy). Unlike the more abundant nitrogen-14, which has an integer nuclear spin and thus a quadrupole moment, ^{15}N has a fractional nuclear spin of one-half, which offers advantages for NMR such as narrower line width. As most nitrogen NMR studies look at a single nitrogen atom in an organic molecule, isotopic labeling is feasible.

Nitrogen-15 tracing is a technique used to study the nitrogen cycle.

== Nitrogen-16 ==
The radioisotope ^{16}N is the dominant radioactivity source in the coolant water of nuclear reactors cooled by water during normal operation. It is produced from ^{16}O (in water) via an (n,p) reaction, in which the ^{16}O atom captures a neutron and expels a proton. It has a short half-life of 7.13 seconds, but its decay back to ^{16}O produces high-energy gamma radiation (6.13 MeV principal line). Because of this, access to the primary coolant piping in a pressurised water reactor must be restricted during reactor power operation. It is a sensitive and immediate indicator of leaks from the primary coolant system to the secondary steam cycle and is the primary means of detection for such leaks.

== See also ==
- Isotopes of oxygen
- Isotopes of carbon
- Isotopes of beryllium
- Isotopes of helium
