= Nitrogen-15 tracing =

Scientific technique

Nitrogen-15 (^{15}N) tracing is a technique to study the nitrogen cycle using the heavier, stable nitrogen isotope ^{15}N. Despite the different weights, ^{15}N is involved in the same chemical reactions as the more abundant ^{14}N and is therefore used to trace and quantify conversions of one nitrogen compound to another. ^{15}N tracing is applied in biogeochemistry, soil science, environmental science, environmental microbiology and small molecule activation research.

== Applications ==
^{15}N tracing allows researchers to distinguish specific nitrogen conversions from a network of simultaneous reactions; e.g. ammonium can at the same time be oxidised by autotrophic microorganisms, produced by mineralisation of organic matter, produced by dissimilatory nitrate reduction and assimilated by microbes and plants. In this case, quantifying the absolute amounts of ammonium does not explain how it is produced or consumed. However, the conversion of one ^{15}N labelled compound to another can directly be linked through the isotopic signature.

^{15}N tracing has been applied to quantify rates of nitrogen transformations in soil and to distinguish the sources of the greenhouse gas nitrous oxide under different environmental conditions.

== Methodical approaches ==
The two main approaches are natural abundance and enrichment techniques.

=== Natural abundance techniques ===
Natural abundance techniques can be applied without artificial disturbance. The natural ^{15}N abundances are expressed in delta (δ) notation relative to the ^{15}N concentration in the air. Due to enzymatic discrimination, natural ^{15}N abundances change slightly in microbially mediated reactions in soil. Apart from δ values, the site preference of ^{15}N and ^{14}N (isotopomers) for the inner or outer position within the nitrous oxide molecule has been used to determine its sources (nitrification or denitrification).

=== Enrichment techniques ===
When nitrogen substrates are artificially enriched (labeled) with ^{15}N, the product of a reaction can directly be linked to its substrate. In contrast to natural abundance techniques, ^{15}N labeling allows to precisely calculate reaction rates. The amendment of additional nitrogen can also be a bias by changing natural nitrogen transformations. In agricultural soil, however, application of ^{15}N enriched tracers, such as ammonium and nitrate, resembles conventional fertilisation practise.

A way to calculate nitrogen transformation rates in soil can be achieved by numerical approximation that takes different, simultaneous nitrogen transformations into account. A numerical tool to study the nitrogen cycle is the N_{trace} model based on a Markov chain Monte Carlo simulation.
