= Three-body force =

Phenomenon in particle physics

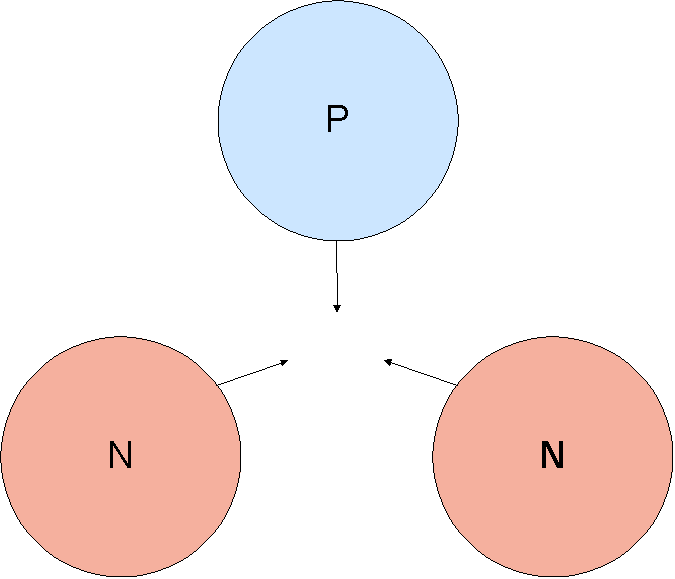
A conjectural example of an interaction between two neutrons and a proton, the triton or hydrogen-3, which is beta unstable. An example of a stable 3-body interaction would be between two protons and one neutron, the helium-3 isotope

A three-body force is a force that does not exist in a system of two objects but appears in a three-body system. In general, if the behaviour of a system of more than two objects cannot be described by the two-body interactions between all possible pairs, as a first approximation, the deviation is mainly due to a three-body force.

The fundamental strong interaction does exhibit such behaviour, the most important example being the stability experimentally observed for the helium-3 isotope, which can be described as a 3-body quantum cluster entity of two protons and one neutron [PNP] in stable superposition. Direct evidence of a 3-body force in helium-3 is known: . The existence of stable [PNP] cluster calls into question models of the atomic nucleus that restrict nucleon interactions within shells to 2-body phenomenon. The three-nucleon-interaction is fundamentally possible because gluons, the mediators of the strong interaction, can couple to themselves. In particle physics, the interactions between the three quarks that compose hadrons can be described in a diquark model which might be equivalent to the hypothesis of a three-body force. There is growing evidence in the field of nuclear physics that three-body forces exist among the nucleons inside atomic nuclei for many different isotopes (three-nucleon force).

== See also ==
- Faddeev equation
- Few-body systems
- n-body problem
- Hydrogen molecular ion
- Borromean nucleus
- Efimov state
- Chiral perturbation theory
