= (n-p) reaction =

Nuclear reaction

The (n-p) reaction, or (n,p) reaction, is an example of a nuclear reaction. It is the reaction which occurs when a neutron enters a nucleus and a proton leaves the nucleus simultaneously.

For example, sulfur-32 (^{32}S) undergoes an (n,p) nuclear reaction when bombarded with neutrons, thus forming phosphorus-32 (^{32}P).

The nuclide nitrogen-14 (^{14}N) can also undergo an (n,p) nuclear reaction to produce carbon-14 (^{14}C). This nuclear reaction ^{14}N (n,p) ^{14}C continually happens in the Earth's atmosphere, forming equilibrium amounts of the radionuclide ^{14}C.

Most (n,p) reactions have threshold neutron energies below which the reaction cannot take place as a result of the charged particle in the exit channel requiring energy (usually more than a MeV) to overcome the Coulomb barrier experienced by the emitted proton. The (n,p) nuclear reaction ^{14}N (n,p) ^{14}C is an exception to this rule – it can take place at all incident neutron energies. The ^{14}N (n,p) ^{14}C nuclear reaction is responsible for most of the radiation dose delivered to the human body by thermal neutrons – these thermal neutrons are absorbed by the nitrogen ^{14}N in proteins, causing a proton to be emitted; the emitted proton deposits its kinetic energy over a very short distance in the body tissue, thereby depositing radiation dose.
