= Isotopes of beryllium =

Isotopes of beryllium (_{4}Be)
Main isotopes			Decay	
Isotope	abundance	half-life (t_{1/2})	mode	product
^{7}Be	trace	53.22 d	ε	^{7}Li
^{8}Be	synth	8.2×10^{−17} s (Note: Also can be considered spontaneous fission, as ^{8}Be splits into two equal ^{4}He nuclei)	α	^{4}He
^{9}Be	100%	stable		
^{10}Be	trace	1.387×10^{6} y	β^{−}	^{10}B

Standard atomic weight A_{r}°(Be)
- 9.0121831±0.0000005; 9.0122±0.0001 (abridged)

Beryllium (_{4}Be) has 11 known isotopes and 3 known isomers, but only one of these isotopes (^{9}Be) is stable and a primordial nuclide. As such, beryllium is considered a monoisotopic element. It is also a mononuclidic element, because its other isotopes have such short half-lives that none are primordial and their abundance is very low. Beryllium is unique as being the only monoisotopic element with an even number of protons (even atomic number) and also has an odd number of neutrons; the 25 other monoisotopic elements all have odd numbers of protons (odd atomic number), and even of neutrons, so the total mass number is still odd.

Of the 10 radioisotopes of beryllium, the most stable are ^{10}Be with a half-life of 1.387 million years and ^{7}Be with a half-life of 53.22 days. All other radioisotopes have half-lives shorter than 15 seconds.

The 1:1 neutron–proton ratio seen in stable isotopes of many light elements (up to oxygen, and in elements with even atomic number up to calcium) is prevented in beryllium by the extreme instability of ^{8}Be toward splitting into two ^{4}He nuclei, which may be seen either as alpha decay or as a type of fission; in any case, the half-life is only 8.2×10^{−17} s, short enough to normally be considered unbound. This, as with the relative instability of all lithium, beryllium, and boron isotopes, is favored due to the extremely tight binding of the helium-4 nucleus.

Beryllium is prevented from having a stable isotope with 4 protons and 6 neutrons by the very lopsided neutron–proton ratio for such a light element. Nevertheless, this isotope, beryllium-10, has a half-life above a million years and a decay energy less than 1 MeV, which indicates unusual stability given that condition.

Most beryllium present in the universe is thought to be formed by cosmic ray nucleosynthesis from cosmic ray spallation in the period between the Big Bang and the formation of the Solar System. The isotopes ^{7}Be and ^{10}Be are both cosmogenic nuclides because they are made, in the Solar System, continually at the rate they decay by spallation, as is carbon-14.

== List of isotopes ==
Nuclide (Note: ^{m}Be – Excited nuclear isomer.)	Z	N	Isotopic mass (Da) (Note: ( ) – Uncertainty (1σ) is given in concise form in parentheses after the corresponding last digits.) (Note: # – Atomic mass marked #: value and uncertainty derived not from purely experimental data, but at least partly from trends from the Mass Surface (TMS).)	Discovery year	Half-life [resonance width]	Decay mode (Note: Modes of decay: EC: / Electron capture; IT: / Isomeric transition; n: / Neutron emission; p: / Proton emission)	Daughter isotope (Note: Bold symbol as daughter – Daughter product is stable.)	Spin and parity (Note: ( ) spin value – Indicates spin with weak assignment arguments.)	Isotopic abundance
Nuclide	Excitation energy			Discovery year	Half-life [resonance width]	Decay mode	Daughter isotope	Spin and parity	Isotopic abundance
^{6}Be (Note: Intermediate in the proton–proton chain (final step of PP I).)	4	2	6.019726(6)	1958	5.0(3) zs [91.6(5.6) keV]	2p	^{4}He	0+	
^{7}Be (Note: Produced in Big Bang nucleosynthesis, but not primordial, as it all quickly decayed to ^{7}Li)	4	3	7.01692871(8)	1938	53.22(6) d	ε	^{7}Li	3/2−	Trace (Note: cosmogenic nuclide)
^{8}Be (Note: Intermediate product of triple alpha process in stellar nucleosynthesis)	4	4	8.00530510(4)	1932	81.9(3.7) as [5.58(25) eV]	α	^{4}He	0+	
^{9}Be (Note: Borromean nucleus)	4	5	9.01218306(8)	1921	Stable			3/2−	1.0000
^{10}Be	4	6	10.01353469(9)	1935	1.387(12)×10^{6} y (Note: Note that NUBASE2020 uses the tropical year to convert between years and other units of time, not the Gregorian year. The relationship between years and other time units in NUBASE2020 is as follows: 1 y = 365.2422 d = 31 556 926 s)	β^{−}	^{10}B	0+	Trace
^{11}Be (Note: Has 1 halo neutron)	4	7	11.02166108(26)	1958	13.76(7) s	β^{−} (96.7(1)%)	^{11}B	1/2+	
^{11}Be	4	7	11.02166108(26)	1958	13.76(7) s	β^{−}α (3.3(1)%)	^{7}Li	1/2+	
^{11}Be	4	7	11.02166108(26)	1958	13.76(7) s	β^{−}p (0.0013(3)%)	^{10}Be	1/2+	
^{12}Be	4	8	12.0269221(20)	1966	21.46(5) ms	β^{−} (99.50(3)%)	^{12}B	0+	
^{12}Be	4	8	12.0269221(20)	1966	21.46(5) ms	β^{−}n (0.50(3)%)	^{11}B	0+	
^{12m}Be	2251(1) keV			2003	233(7) ns	IT	^{12}Be	0+	
^{13}Be	4	9	13.036135(11)	1983	1.0(7) zs	n ?	^{12}Be	(1/2−)	
^{14}Be (Note: Has 4 halo neutrons)	4	10	14.04289(14)	1973	4.53(27) ms	β^{−}n (86(6)%)	^{13}B	0+	
^{14}Be	4	10	14.04289(14)	1973	4.53(27) ms	β^{−} (> 9.0(6.3)%)	^{14}B	0+	
^{14}Be	4	10	14.04289(14)	1973	4.53(27) ms	β^{−}2n (5(2)%)	^{12}B	0+	
^{14}Be	4	10	14.04289(14)	1973	4.53(27) ms	β^{−}t (0.02(1)%)	^{11}Be	0+	
^{14}Be	4	10	14.04289(14)	1973	4.53(27) ms	β^{−}α (< 0.004%)	^{10}Li	0+	
^{15}Be	4	11	15.05349(18)	2013	790(270) ys	n	^{14}Be	(5/2+)	
^{16}Be	4	12	16.06167(18)	2012	650(130) ys [0.73(18) MeV]	2n	^{14}Be	0+	
This table header & footer:

== Beryllium-7 ==
Beryllium-7 is an isotope with a half-life of 53.22 days that is generated naturally as a cosmogenic nuclide. It is also a nuisance byproduct in nuclear reactors and accelerators. The rate at which the short-lived ^{7}Be is transferred from the air to the ground is controlled in part by the weather. ^{7}Be decay in the Sun (the half-life in stars can be greatly different from the normal as it is a free rather than a bound electron that is captured) is one of the sources of solar neutrinos, and the first type ever detected using the Homestake experiment. Presence of ^{7}Be in sediments is often used to establish that they are fresh, i.e. less than about 3–4 months in age, or about two half-lives of ^{7}Be.

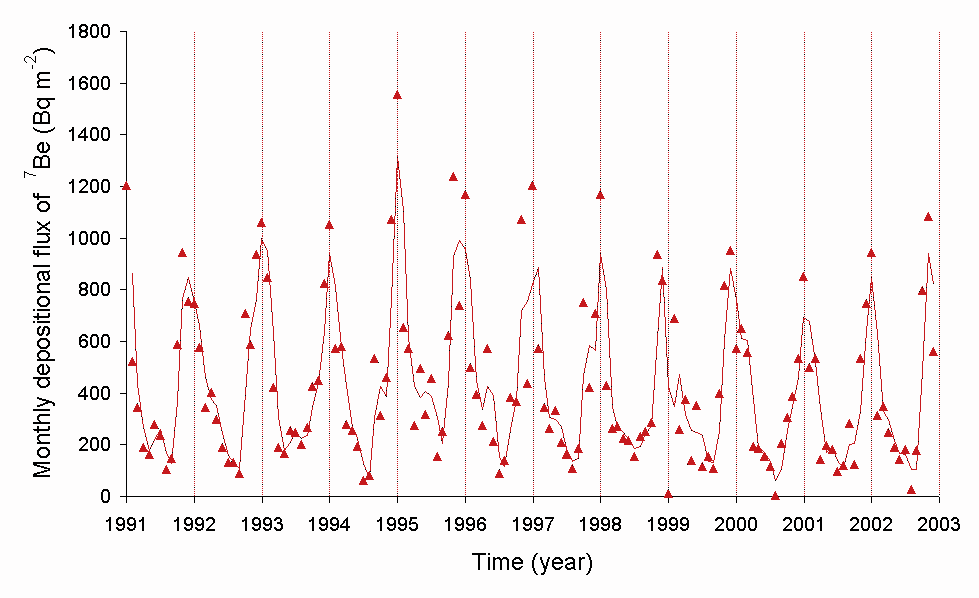
The rate of delivery of ^{7}Be from the air to the ground in Japan

== Beryllium-8 ==
Beryllium-8 decays almost immediately into two alpha particles, as its total energy is about 92 keV greater than that of the two alpha particles and the Coulomb barrier to decay is negligible. This is unusual among light N = Z nuclides and creates a bottleneck in stellar nucleosynthesis, which requires that a third alpha be immediately captured—the triple-alpha process—to form stable carbon-12 and thence all heavier elements.

== Beryllium-10 ==
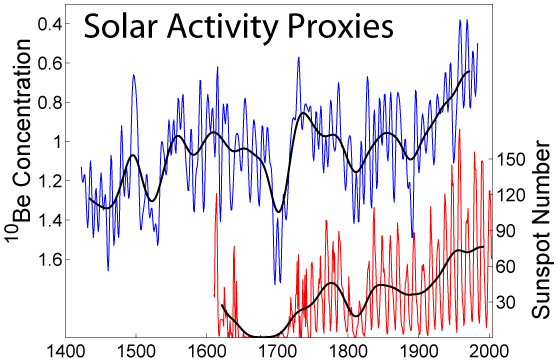
Plot showing variations in solar activity, including variation in ^{10}Be concentration which varies inversely with solar activity. (Note that the beryllium scale is inverted, so increases on this scale indicate lower beryllium-10 levels).

Beryllium-10 (^{10}Be) has a half-life of 1.387 million years and beta decays to stable boron-10 with a maximum energy of 556.0 keV:

^{10}Be → ^{10}B + e^{−}.

Beryllium-10 is formed in the Earth's atmosphere mainly by cosmic ray spallation of nitrogen and oxygen.

Because beryllium tends to exist in solutions below about pH 5.5 (and rainwater above many industrialized areas can have a pH less than 5), it will dissolve and be transported to the Earth's surface via rainwater. As the precipitation quickly becomes more alkaline, beryllium drops out of solution. Cosmogenic ^{10}Be thereby accumulates at the soil surface, where its relatively long half-life does not limit its residence time there.

^{10}Be and its daughter product have been used in surface exposure dating to examine soil erosion, soil formation from regolith, the development of lateritic soils and the age of ice cores. It is also formed in nuclear explosions by a reaction of fast neutrons with ^{13}C in the carbon dioxide in air, and is one of the historical indicators of past activity at nuclear test sites. ^{10}Be decay is a significant isotope used as a proxy data measure for cosmogenic nuclides to characterize solar and extra-solar attributes of the past from terrestrial samples.

The rate of production of beryllium-10 depends on the activity of the sun. When solar activity is low (low numbers of sunspots and low solar wind), the barrier against cosmic rays that exists beyond the termination shock is weakened (see Cosmic ray#Cosmic-ray flux). This means more beryllium-10 is produced, and it can be detected millennia later. Beryllium-10 can thus serve as a marker of Miyake events, such as the 774–775 carbon-14 spike. There can be an effect on climate (see Homeric Minimum). While other cosmogenic isotopes experience similar cycles, the high rate of production, long half-life, and relative immobility in the environment make this most suitable for this purpose.

== Decay chains ==
Isotopes of beryllium heavier than the stable ^{9}Be decay via beta decay or a combination of beta decay and neutron emission. However, ^{8}Be splits in two to result in ^{4}He. Then, ^{7}Be decays only via electron capture, an exceptional occurrence in such a light element. For this reason, its half-life can be artificially lowered by 0.83% via endohedral enclosure (^{7}Be@C_{60}). Finally even lighter isotopes decay exclusively by emitting protons and are also (like ^{8}Be) unbound. The decay of all known beryllium isotopes is summarized as follows:

$$\begin{array}{l}{}\\
\ce{^6_4Be -> [5 \ \ce{zs}] {^4_2He} + {2^1_1H}} \\
\ce{{^7_4Be} + e^- -> [53.22 \ \ce{d}] {^7_3Li}} \\
\ce{^8_4Be -> [81.9 \ \ce{as}] {2^4_2He}} \\
\ce{^{10}_4Be -> [1.387 \ \ce{Ma}] {^{10}_5B} + e^-} \\
\ce{^{11}_4Be -> [13.76 \ \ce{s}] {^{11}_5B} + e^-} \\
\ce{^{11}_4Be -> [13.76 \ \ce{s}] {^7_3Li} + {^4_2He} + e^-} \\
\ce{^{12}_4Be -> [21.46 \ \ce{ms}] {^{12}_5B} + e^-} \\
\ce{^{12}_4Be -> [21.46 \ \ce{ms}] {^{11}_5B} + {^1_0n} + e^-} \\
\ce{^{13}_4Be -> [1 \ \ce{zs}] {^{12}_4Be} + {^1_0n}} \\
\ce{^{14}_4Be -> [4.53 \ \ce{ms}] {^{13}_5B} + {^1_0n} + e^-} \\
\ce{^{14}_4Be -> [4.53 \ \ce{ms}] {^{14}_5B} + e^-} \\
\ce{^{14}_4Be -> [4.53 \ \ce{ms}] {^{12}_5B} + {2^1_0n} + e^-} \\
\ce{^{15}_4Be -> [790 \ \ce{ys}] {^{14}_4Be} + {^1_0n}} \\{}
\ce{^{16}_4Be -> [650 \ \ce{ys}] {^{14}_4Be} + {2^1_0n}} \\{}
\end{array}$$

== See also ==
Daughter products other than beryllium

- Isotopes of boron
- Isotopes of lithium
- Isotopes of helium
