= Neutron emission =

Type of radioactive decay

Neutron emission is a mode of radioactive decay in which one or more neutrons are ejected from a nucleus. It occurs in the most neutron-rich/proton-deficient nuclides, and also from excited states of other nuclides as in photoneutron emission and beta-delayed neutron emission. As only a neutron is lost by this process the number of protons remains unchanged, and an atom does not become an atom of a different element, but a different isotope of the same element.

Neutrons are also produced in the spontaneous and induced fission of certain heavy nuclides.

== Spontaneous neutron emission ==
As a consequence of the Pauli exclusion principle, nuclei with an excess of protons or neutrons have a higher average energy per nucleon. Nuclei with a sufficient excess of neutrons have a greater energy than the combination of a free neutron and a nucleus with one less neutron, and therefore can decay by neutron emission. Nuclei which can decay by this process are described as lying beyond the neutron drip line.

Two examples of isotopes that emit neutrons are beryllium-13 (decaying to beryllium-12 with a mean life 2.7×10^{−21} s) and helium-5 (helium-4, 7×10^{−22} s).

In tables of nuclear decay modes, neutron emission is commonly denoted by the abbreviation n.

Neutron emitters to the left of lower dashed line (see also: Table of nuclides)
Z →	0	1	2	3											
n ↓	n	H	He	Li	4	5									
0		^{1}H			Be	B	6	7							
1	^{1}n	^{2}H	^{3}He	^{4}Li			C	N	8						
2		^{3}H	^{4}He	^{5}Li	^{6}Be	^{7}B	^{8}C	^{9}N	O	9					
3		^{4}H	^{5}He	^{6}Li	^{7}Be	^{8}B	^{9}C	^{10}N	^{11}O	F	10				
4		^{5}H	^{6}He	^{7}Li	^{8}Be	^{9}B	^{10}C	^{11}N	^{12}O	^{13}F	Ne	11	12		
	5	^{6}H	^{7}He	^{8}Li	^{9}Be	^{10}B	^{11}C	^{12}N	^{13}O	^{14}F	^{15}Ne	Na	Mg	13	
	6	^{7}H	^{8}He	^{9}Li	^{10}Be	^{11}B	^{12}C	^{13}N	^{14}O	^{15}F	^{16}Ne	^{17}Na	^{18}Mg	Al	14
		7	^{9}He	^{10}Li	^{11}Be	^{12}B	^{13}C	^{14}N	^{15}O	^{16}F	^{17}Ne	^{18}Na	^{19}Mg	^{20}Al	Si
		8	^{10}He	^{11}Li	^{12}Be	^{13}B	^{14}C	^{15}N	^{16}O	^{17}F	^{18}Ne	^{19}Na	^{20}Mg	^{21}Al	^{22}Si
			9	^{12}Li	^{13}Be	^{14}B	^{15}C	^{16}N	^{17}O	^{18}F	^{19}Ne	^{20}Na	^{21}Mg	^{22}Al	^{23}Si
			10	^{13}Li	^{14}Be	^{15}B	^{16}C	^{17}N	^{18}O	^{19}F	^{20}Ne	^{21}Na	^{22}Mg	^{23}Al	^{24}Si
				11	^{15}Be	^{16}B	^{17}C	^{18}N	^{19}O	^{20}F	^{21}Ne	^{22}Na	^{23}Mg	^{24}Al	^{25}Si
				12	^{16}Be	^{17}B	^{18}C	^{19}N	^{20}O	^{21}F	^{22}Ne	^{23}Na	^{24}Mg	^{25}Al	^{26}Si
					13	^{18}B	^{19}C	^{20}N	^{21}O	^{22}F	^{23}Ne	^{24}Na	^{25}Mg	^{26}Al	^{27}Si
					14	^{19}B	^{20}C	^{21}N	^{22}O	^{23}F	^{24}Ne	^{25}Na	^{26}Mg	^{27}Al	^{28}Si

=== Double neutron emission ===
Some neutron-rich isotopes decay by the emission of two or more neutrons. For example, hydrogen-5 and helium-10 decay by the emission of two neutrons, hydrogen-6 by the emission of 3 or 4 neutrons, and hydrogen-7 by emission of 4 neutrons.

== Photoneutron emission ==
Some nuclides can be induced to eject a neutron by gamma radiation. One such nuclide is ^{9}Be; its photodisintegration is significant in nuclear astrophysics, pertaining to the abundance of beryllium and the consequences of the instability of ^{8}Be. This also makes this isotope useful as a neutron source in nuclear reactors. Another nuclide, ^{181}Ta, is also known to be readily capable of photodisintegration; this process is thought to be responsible for the creation of ^{180m}Ta, the only primordial nuclear isomer and the rarest primordial nuclide.

== Beta-delayed neutron emission ==
Neutron emission usually happens from nuclei that are in an excited state, such as the excited ^{17}O* produced from the beta decay of ^{17}N. The neutron emission process itself is controlled by the nuclear force and therefore is extremely fast, sometimes referred to as "nearly instantaneous". This process allows unstable atoms to become more stable. The ejection of the neutron may be as a product of the movement of many nucleons, but it is ultimately mediated by the repulsive action of the nuclear force that exists at extremely short-range distances between nucleons.

=== Delayed neutrons in reactor control ===
Most neutron emission outside prompt neutron production associated with fission (either induced or spontaneous), is from neutron-heavy isotopes produced as fission products. These neutrons are sometimes emitted with a delay, giving them the term delayed neutrons, but the actual delay in their production is a delay waiting for the beta decay of fission products to produce the excited-state nuclear precursors that immediately undergo prompt neutron emission. Thus, the delay in neutron emission is not from the neutron-production process, but rather its precursor beta decay, which is controlled by the weak force, and thus requires a far longer time. The beta decay half-lives for the precursors to delayed neutron-emitter radioisotopes, are typically fractions of a second to tens of seconds.

Nevertheless, the delayed neutrons emitted by neutron-rich fission products aid control of nuclear reactors by making reactivity change far more slowly than it would if it were controlled by prompt neutrons alone. About 0.65% of neutrons are released in a nuclear chain reaction in a delayed way due to the mechanism of neutron emission, and it is this fraction of neutrons that allows a nuclear reactor to be controlled on human reaction time-scales, without proceeding to a prompt critical state, and runaway meltdown.

In reactors, gamma rays from beta-decaying fission products can also induce photodisintegration, as most fission-product gamma rays exceed the low neutron binding energies of deuterium and beryllium. Because their emission rate is set by the slow beta decay of the fission products, these photoneutrons behave as an additional group of delayed neutrons in reactor kinetics, and are of practical importance mainly in D2O-moderated reactors and in reactors with beryllium moderators or reflectors.

== Neutron emission in fission ==
=== Induced fission ===
A synonym for such neutron emission is "prompt neutron" production, of the type that is best known to occur simultaneously with induced nuclear fission. Induced fission happens only when a nucleus is bombarded with neutrons, gamma rays, or other carriers of energy. Many heavy isotopes, most notably californium-252, also emit prompt neutrons among the products of a similar spontaneous radioactive decay process, spontaneous fission.

=== Spontaneous fission ===
Spontaneous fission happens when a nucleus splits into two (occasionally three) smaller nuclei and generally one or more neutrons.

== See also ==
- Neutron radiation
- Neutron source
- Proton emission
