= Halo nucleus =

Core atomic nucleus surrounded by orbiting protons or neutrons

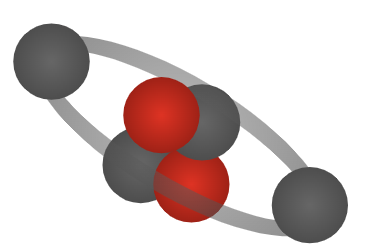
Helium-6 nucleus

In nuclear physics, an atomic nucleus is called a halo nucleus or is said to have a nuclear halo when it has a core nucleus surrounded by a "halo" of orbiting protons or neutrons, which makes the radius of the nucleus appreciably larger than that predicted by the liquid drop model. Halo nuclei form at the extreme edges of the table of nuclides — the neutron drip line and the proton drip line — and have short half-lives, often measured in milliseconds. These nuclei are studied shortly after their formation in an ion beam.

Typically, an atomic nucleus is a tightly bound group of protons and neutrons. However, in some nuclides, there is an overabundance of one species of nucleon. In some of these cases, a nuclear core and a halo will form.

Often, this property may be detected in scattering experiments, which show the nucleus to be much larger than the otherwise expected value. Normally, the cross-section (corresponding to the classical radius) of the nucleus is proportional to the cube root of its mass, as would be the case for a sphere of constant density. Specifically, for a nucleus of mass number A, the radius r is (approximately)

$$r = r_\circ A^{\frac{1}{3}},$$

where $r_\circ$ is 1.2 fm.

One example of a halo nucleus is ^{11}Li, which has a half-life of 8.6 ms. It contains a core of 3 protons and 6 neutrons, and a halo of two independent and loosely bound neutrons. It decays into ^{11}Be by the emission of an antineutrino and an electron. Its mass radius of 3.16 fm is close to that of ^{32}S or, even more impressively, of ^{208}Pb, both much heavier nuclei.

Experimental confirmation of nuclear halos is recent and ongoing. Additional candidates are suspected. Several nuclides including ^{9}B, ^{13}N, and ^{15}N are calculated to have a halo in the excited state but not in the ground state.

== List of known nuclides with nuclear halo ==
Element		Nuclear halo isotopes			
Z	name	Count	nuclides	halo	half-life in ms
2	helium	2	helium-6 helium-8	2 neutrons 4 neutrons	801(10); 119.1(12)
3	lithium	1	lithium-11	2 neutrons	8.75(14)
4	beryllium	2	beryllium-11 beryllium-14	1 neutron 4 neutrons	13810(80); 4.35(17)
5	boron	3	boron-8 boron-17 boron-19	1 proton 2 neutrons 4 neutrons	770(3); 5.08(5); 2.92(13)
6	carbon	2	carbon-19 carbon-22	1 neutron 2 neutrons	49(4); 6.1^{+1.4}_{−1.2}
10	neon	1	neon-17	2 protons	109.2(6)
15	phosphorus	1	phosphorus-26	1 proton	43.7(6)
16	sulfur	1	sulfur-27	2 protons	15.5(15)

Nuclei that have a neutron halo include ^{11}Be and ^{19}C. A two-neutron halo is exhibited by ^{6}He, ^{11}Li, ^{17}B, ^{19}B and ^{22}C.

Two-neutron halo nuclei break into three fragments and are called Borromean because of this behavior, analogously to how all three of the Borromean rings are linked together but no two share a link. For example, the two-neutron halo nucleus ^{6}He (which can be taken as a three-body system consisting of an alpha particle and two neutrons) is bound, but neither ^{5}He nor the dineutron is. ^{8}He and ^{14}Be both exhibit a four-neutron halo.

Nuclei that have a proton halo include ^{8}B and ^{26}P. A two-proton halo is exhibited by ^{17}Ne and ^{27}S. Proton halos are expected to be rarer and more unstable than neutron halos because of the repulsive forces of the excess proton(s).

== See also ==
- Halo nuclei and nuclear force range limits
- Isotopes of lithium
- Exotic atom
- Borromean nucleus
