= Helium-4 =

Isotope of helium

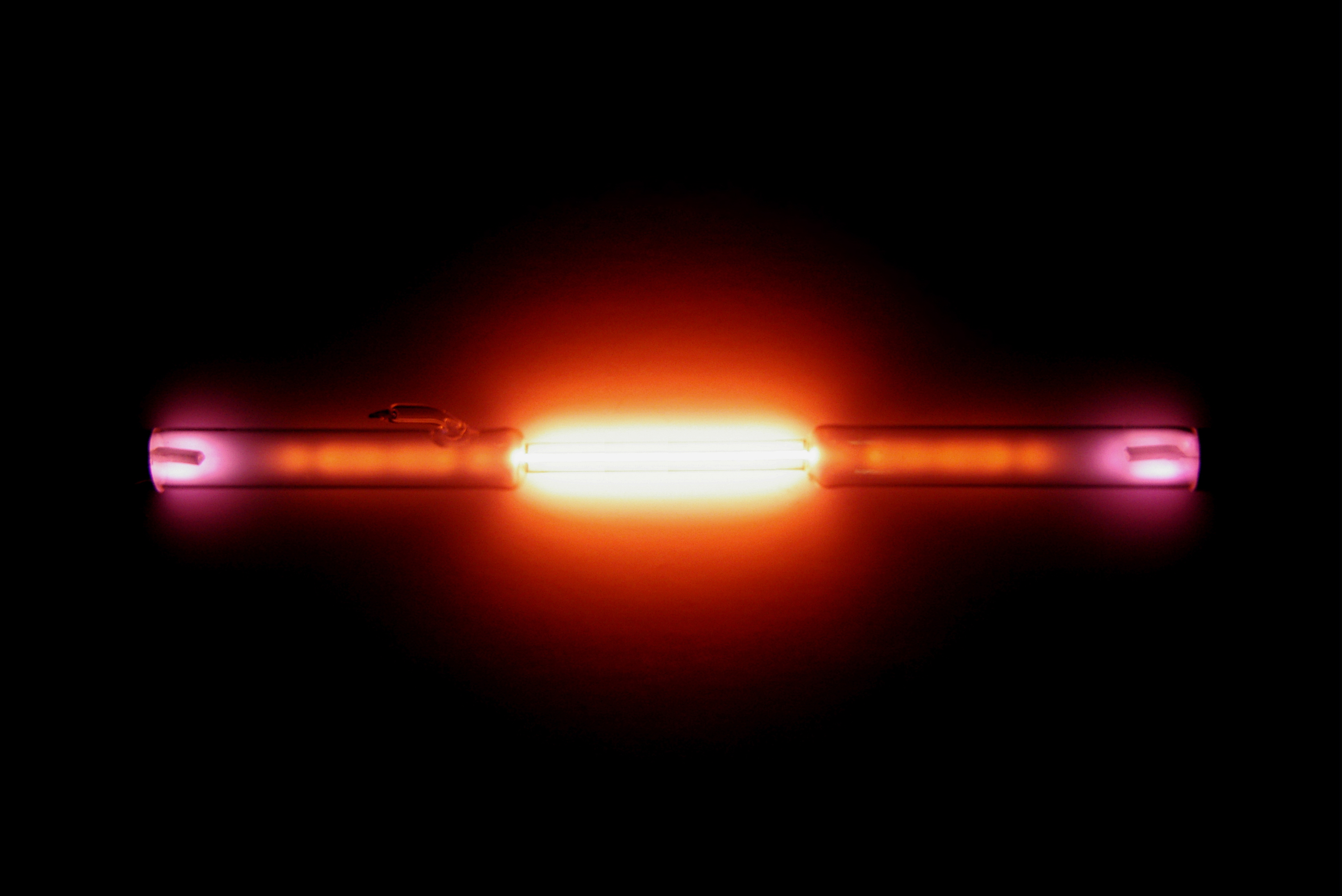

General
- Symbol: ^{4}He
- Names: helium-4
- Protons (Z): 2
- Neutrons (N): 2

Nuclide data
- Natural abundance: 99.999863% (atmosphere)
- Half-life (t_{1/2}): stable
- Isotope mass: 4.002603254 Da
- Spin: 0
- Nuclear binding energy: 28295.7 keV

The helium atom. Depicted are the nucleus (pink) and the electron cloud distribution (black). The nucleus (upper right) in helium-4 is in reality spherically symmetric and closely resembles the electron cloud, although for more complicated nuclei this is not always the case.

Helium-4 (^{4}He) is a stable isotope of the element helium. It is by far the more abundant of the two naturally occurring isotopes of helium, making up virtually all the helium on Earth. Its nucleus consists of two protons and two neutrons and is identical to an alpha particle.

== Occurrence ==
Helium-4 makes up about one quarter of the ordinary matter in the universe by mass, with almost all of the rest being hydrogen. While nuclear fusion in stars also produces helium-4, most of the helium-4 in the Sun and in the universe is thought to have been produced during the Big Bang, known as "primordial helium". However, primordial helium-4 is largely absent from the Earth, having escaped during the high-temperature phase of Earth's formation. On Earth, most naturally occurring helium-4 is produced by the alpha decay of heavy elements in the Earth's crust, after the planet cooled and solidified.

== Properties ==
When liquid helium-4 is cooled to below 2.17 K (−270.98 °C), it becomes a superfluid, with properties very different from those of an ordinary liquid. For example, if superfluid helium-4 is placed in an open vessel, a thin Rollin film will climb the sides of the vessel, causing the liquid to escape. The total spin of the helium-4 nucleus is an integer (zero), making it a boson. The superfluid behavior is a manifestation of Bose–Einstein condensation, which occurs only in collections of bosons.

It is theorized that at 0.2 K and 50 atm, solid helium-4 may be a superglass (an amorphous solid exhibiting superfluidity).

== The helium-4 atom ==
The helium atom is the second simplest atom (hydrogen is the simplest), but the extra electron introduces a third "body", so its wave equation becomes a "three-body problem", which has no analytic solution. However, numerical approximations of the equations of quantum mechanics have given a good estimate of the key atomic properties of helium-4, such as its size and ionization energy.

The size of the ^{4}He nucleus has long been known to be in the order of magnitude of 1 fm. In an experiment involving the use of exotic helium atoms where an atomic electron was replaced by a muon, the nucleus size (as charge radius) has been estimated to be 1.67824(83) fm.

== Stability of the ^{4}He nucleus and electron shell ==
The nucleus of the helium-4 atom has a type of stability called doubly magic. High-energy electron-scattering experiments show its charge to decrease exponentially from a maximum at a central point, exactly as does the charge density of helium's own electron cloud. This symmetry reflects similar underlying physics: the pair of neutrons and the pair of protons in helium's nucleus obey the same quantum mechanical rules as do helium's pair of electrons (although the nuclear particles are subject to a different nuclear binding potential), so that all these fermions fully occupy 1s orbitals in pairs, none of them possessing orbital angular momentum, and each canceling the other's intrinsic spin. Adding another of any of these particles would require angular momentum, and would release substantially less energy (in fact, no nucleus with five nucleons is stable). This arrangement is thus energetically extremely stable for all these particles, and this stability accounts for many crucial facts regarding helium in nature.

For example, the stability and low energy of the electron cloud of helium causes helium's chemical inertness (the most extreme of all the elements), and also the lack of interaction of helium atoms with each other (producing the lowest melting and boiling points of all the elements).

In a similar way, the particular energetic stability of the helium-4 nucleus, produced by similar effects, accounts for the ease of helium-4 production in atomic reactions involving both heavy-particle emission and fusion. Some stable helium-3 is produced in fusion reactions from hydrogen, but it is a very small fraction, compared with the highly energetically favorable production of helium-4. The stability of helium-4 is the reason that hydrogen is converted to helium-4, and not deuterium (hydrogen-2) or helium-3 or other heavier elements during fusion reactions in the Sun. It is also partly responsible for the alpha particle being by far the most common type of baryonic particle to be ejected from an atomic nucleus; in other words, alpha decay is far more common than cluster decay.

Binding energy per nucleon of common isotopes. The binding energy per particle of helium-4 is significantly larger than all nearby nuclides.

The unusual stability of the helium-4 nucleus is also important cosmologically. It explains the fact that, in the first few minutes after the Big Bang, as the "soup" of free protons and neutrons which had initially been created in about a 6:1 ratio cooled to the point where nuclear binding was possible, almost all atomic nuclei to form were helium-4 nuclei. The binding of the nucleons in helium-4 is so tight that its production consumed nearly all the free neutrons in a few minutes, before they could beta decay, and left very few to form heavier atoms (especially lithium, beryllium, and boron). The energy of helium-4 nuclear binding per nucleon is stronger than in any of those elements (see nucleogenesis and binding energy), and thus no energetic "drive" was available to make elements 3, 4, and 5 once helium had been formed. It is barely energetically favorable for helium to fuse into the next element with a higher energy per nucleon (carbon). However, due to the rarity of intermediate elements, and extreme instability of beryllium-8 (the product when two ^{4}He nuclei fuse), this process needs three helium nuclei striking each other nearly simultaneously (see triple-alpha process). There was thus no time for significant carbon to be formed in the few minutes after the Big Bang, before the early expanding universe cooled to the temperature and pressure where helium fusion to carbon was no longer possible. This left the early universe with a very similar hydrogen–helium ratio as is observed today (3 parts hydrogen to 1 part helium-4 by mass), with nearly all the neutrons in the universe trapped in helium-4.

All heavier elements—including those necessary for rocky planets like the Earth, and for carbon-based or other life—thus had to be produced, since the Big Bang, in stars which were hot enough to fuse elements heavier than hydrogen. All elements other than hydrogen and helium today account for only 2% of the mass of atomic matter in the universe. Helium-4, by contrast, makes up about 23% of the universe's ordinary matter—nearly all the ordinary matter that is not hydrogen (^{1}H).

== See also ==
- Big Bang nucleosynthesis

Lighter: helium-3	Helium-4 is an isotope of helium	Heavier: helium-5
Decay product of: lithium-5 (p) helium-5 (n) beryllium-6 (2p) beryllium-8 (α)	Decay chain of helium-4	Decays to: Stable
