= Isotopes of lithium =

Isotopes of lithium (_{3}Li)
Main isotopes			Decay	
Isotope	abundance	half-life (t_{1/2})	mode	product
^{6}Li	[1.9%, 7.8%]	stable		
^{7}Li	[92.2%, 98.1%]	stable		
Significant variation occurs in commercial samples because of the wide distribution of samples depleted in ^{6}Li.

Standard atomic weight A_{r}°(Li)
- [6.938, 6.997]; 6.94±0.06 (abridged)

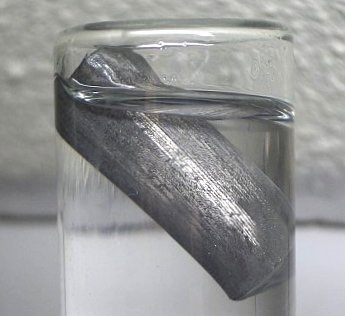
Ingot of lithium suspended in oil

Naturally occurring lithium (_{3}Li) is composed of two stable isotopes, lithium-6 (^{6}Li) and lithium-7 (^{7}Li), with the latter being far more abundant on Earth. Radioisotopes are short-lived: the particle-bound ones, ^{8}Li, ^{9}Li, and ^{11}Li, have half-lives of 838.7, 178.2, and 8.75 milliseconds respectively.

Both of the natural isotopes have anomalously low nuclear binding energy per nucleon (5332.3312(3) keV for ^{6}Li and 5606.4401(6) keV for ^{7}Li) when compared with the adjacent lighter and heavier elements, helium (7073.9156(4) keV for helium-4) and beryllium (6462.6693(85) keV for beryllium-9), and so their synthesis requires non-equilibrium conditions.

Both ^{7}Li and ^{6}Li were produced in the Big Bang, with ^{7}Li estimated to be 5×10^{−10} of all primordial matter, and ^{6}Li around 10^{−14} (undetectable). This difference is significant because both isotopes of lithium are efficiently destroyed by protons, while beryllium-7 is not and subsequently decays to lithium. A portion of ^{7}Li is also known to be formed in certain stars (red giants), called the Cameron–Fowler mechanism; while beryllium-7 is a normal product of nuclear burning, it can only contribute to lithium production if it is convected to the surface before it decays. Thus, it is considered that almost all ^{6}Li, like much ^{7}Li, is cosmogenic and produced by spallation.

The isotopes of lithium separate somewhat during a variety of geological processes, including mineral formation (chemical precipitation and ion exchange) – for example, lithium ions replace magnesium or iron in certain octahedral locations in clays, and ^{6}Li is sometimes preferred over ^{7}Li, resulting in enrichment of the clays. It is considered that an accurate relative atomic mass for samples of lithium cannot be measured for all sources of lithium.

In nuclear physics, ^{6}Li is an important isotope, because when it is exposed to slow neutrons, tritium is produced with nearly 100% yield; contrarily, ^{7}Li is almost unreactive with slow neutrons.

Both ^{6}Li and ^{7}Li isotopes show nuclear magnetic resonance, despite being quadrupolar (with nuclear spins of 1+ and 3/2−). ^{6}Li has sharper lines, but due to its lower abundance requires a more sensitive NMR-spectrometer. ^{7}Li is more abundant, but has broader lines because of its larger nuclear spin and quadrupole. The range of chemical shifts is the same of both nuclei and lies within +10 (for LiNH_{2} in liquid NH_{3}) and −12 (for Li+ in fulleride).

== List of isotopes ==
Nuclide	Z	N	Isotopic mass (Da) (Note: ( ) – Uncertainty (1σ) is given in concise form in parentheses after the corresponding last digits.) (Note: # – Atomic mass marked #: value and uncertainty derived not from purely experimental data, but at least partly from trends from the Mass Surface (TMS).)	Discovery year	Half-life [resonance width]	Decay mode (Note: Modes of decay: IT: / Isomeric transition; n: / Neutron emission; p: / Proton emission)	Daughter isotope (Note: Bold symbol as daughter – Daughter product is stable.)	Spin and parity (Note: ( ) spin value – Indicates spin with weak assignment arguments.) (Note: # – Values marked # are not purely derived from experimental data, but at least partly from trends of neighboring nuclides (TNN).)	Natural abundance (mole fraction)	
Nuclide	Z	N	Isotopic mass (Da)	Discovery year	Half-life [resonance width]	Decay mode	Daughter isotope	Spin and parity	Normal proportion	Range of variation
^{4}Li	3	1	4.02719(23)	1965	91(9) ys [5.06(52) MeV]	p	^{3}He	2−		
^{5}Li	3	2	5.012540(50)	1941	370(30) ys [1.24(10) MeV]	p	^{4}He	3/2−		
^{6}Li (Note: One of the few stable odd-odd nuclei)	3	3	6.0151228874(15)	1921	Stable			1+	[0.019, 0.078]	
^{7}Li (Note: Produced in Big Bang nucleosynthesis and by cosmic ray spallation)	3	4	7.016003434(4)	1921	Stable			3/2−	[0.922, 0.981]	
^{8}Li	3	5	8.02248624(5)	1935	838.7(3) ms	β^{−}	^{8}Be (Note: Immediately decays into two α-particles for a net reaction of ^{8}Li → 2^{4}He + e^{−})	2+		
^{9}Li	3	6	9.02679019(20)	1951	178.2(4) ms	β^{−}n (50.5(1.0)%)	^{8}Be (Note: Immediately decays into two α-particles for a net reaction of ^{9}Li → 2^{4}He + ^{1}n + e^{−})	3/2−		
^{9}Li	3	6	9.02679019(20)	1951	178.2(4) ms	β^{−} (49.5(1.0)%)	^{9}Be	3/2−		
^{10}Li	3	7	10.035483(14)	1975	2.0(5) zs [0.2(1.2) MeV]	n	^{9}Li	(1−, 2−)		
^{11}Li (Note: Has 2 halo neutrons)	3	8	11.0437236(7)	1966	8.75(6) ms	β^{−}n (86.3(9)%)	^{10}Be	3/2−		
^{11}Li	3	8	11.0437236(7)	1966	8.75(6) ms	β^{−} (6.0(1.0)%)	^{11}Be	3/2−		
^{11}Li	3	8	11.0437236(7)	1966	8.75(6) ms	β^{−}2n (4.1(4)%)	^{9}Be	3/2−		
^{11}Li	3	8	11.0437236(7)	1966	8.75(6) ms	β^{−}3n (1.9(2)%)	^{8}Be (Note: Immediately decays into two ^{4}He atoms for a net reaction of ^{11}Li → 2^{4}He + 3^{1}n + e^{−})	3/2−		
^{11}Li	3	8	11.0437236(7)	1966	8.75(6) ms	β^{−}α (1.7(3)%)	^{7}He	3/2−		
^{11}Li	3	8	11.0437236(7)	1966	8.75(6) ms	β^{−}d (0.0130(13)%)	^{9}Li	3/2−		
^{11}Li	3	8	11.0437236(7)	1966	8.75(6) ms	β^{−}t (0.0093(8)%)	^{8}Li	3/2−		
^{12}Li	3	9	12.05378(107)#	2010	< 10 ns	n ? (Note: Decay mode shown is energetically allowed, but has not been experimentally observed to occur in this nuclide.)	^{11}Li	(1−, 2−)		
^{13}Li	3	10	13.061170(80)	2008	3.3(1.2) zs [0.2(9.2) MeV]	2n	^{11}Li	3/2−#		
This table header & footer:

== Isotope separation ==
=== Colex separation ===
Lithium-6 has a greater affinity than lithium-7 for the element mercury. When an amalgam of lithium and mercury is added to solutions containing lithium hydroxide, the lithium-6 becomes more concentrated in the amalgam and the lithium-7 more in the hydroxide solution.

The COLEX (column exchange) separation method makes use of this by passing a counter-flow of amalgam and hydroxide through a cascade of stages. The fraction of lithium-6 is preferentially drained by the mercury, and the lithium-7 retained with the hydroxide. At the bottom of the column, the lithium (enriched with lithium-6) is separated from the amalgam, and the mercury is recovered to be reused with fresh raw material. At the top, the lithium hydroxide solution is electrolyzed to liberate the lithium-7 fraction. The enrichment obtained with this method varies with the column length and the flow speed.

=== Other methods ===
In the vacuum distillation technique, lithium is heated to a temperature of about 550 °C in a vacuum. Lithium atoms evaporate from the liquid surface and are collected on a cold surface positioned a few centimetres above the liquid surface. Since lithium-6 atoms have a higher velocity at the same temperature (due to lower mass), they evaporate preferentially and, if no gaseous collisions occur, are collected in the same ratio (i.e. the mean free path should be large compared to the distance). The theoretical separation efficiency of this method is about 8.0 percent, the square root of the mass ratio. A multistage process may be used to obtain higher degrees of separation.

The isotopes of lithium, in principle, can also be separated through electrochemical methods or distillation chromatography, which are currently under research.

== Lithium-5 ==
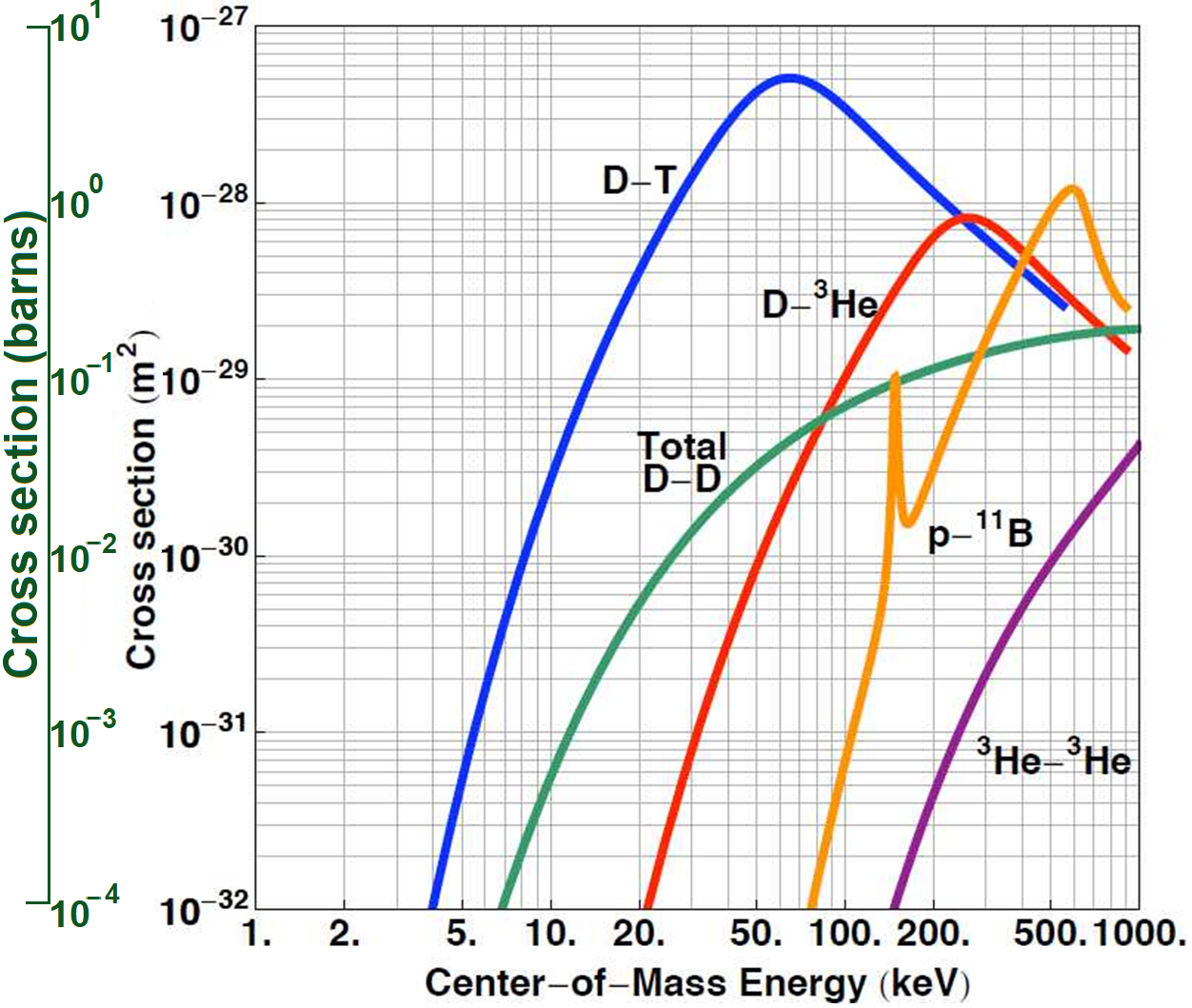
Fusion cross sections of major reactions. Without the resonance in lithium-5, the D–^{3}He reaction would have a far lower cross-section.

Lithium-5 is very short-lived (< 10^{−21} s), decaying into a proton and helium-4. It is formed as an intermediate in the fusion of deuterium and helium-3:

$${}^2\mathrm{D} + {}^3\mathrm{He} \longrightarrow {}^5\mathrm{Li}^{*} \longrightarrow {}^4\mathrm{He} + \mathrm{p} + 18.4\ \mathrm{MeV}$$

The reaction is greatly enhanced by the existence of a resonance. Lithium-5, which has a natural spin state of −3/2 at the 0 MeV ground state, has a +3/2 excited spin state at 16.66 MeV. Because the reaction creates lithium-5 nuclei with an energy level close to this state, it happens more frequently. A symmetrical resonance in the helium-5 nucleus makes the deuterium–tritium fusion reaction the most favourable known.

== Lithium-6 ==
Lithium-6 is valuable as the source material for the production of tritium (hydrogen-3) through absorption of neutrons. Between 1.9% and 7.8% of terrestrial lithium consists of lithium-6, with the rest being lithium-7. Large amounts of lithium-6 have been separated out for use in thermonuclear weapons.

The deuterium–tritium fusion reaction has been investigated as a possible energy source, as it is currently the only fusion reaction with sufficient energy output for feasible implementation. In this scenario, lithium enriched in lithium-6 would be required to generate the necessary quantities of tritium. Mineral and brine lithium resources are a potential limiting factor in this scenario, but lithium could be extracted from seawater if necessary. Pressurized heavy-water reactors such as the CANDU produce small quantities of tritium in their coolant/moderator from neutron absorption, and this is sometimes extracted, presenting an alternative to the use of lithium-6 for small quantities of tritium.

Lithium-6 is one of only three stable isotopes with a ground-state spin of 1, the others being deuterium and nitrogen-14, and has the smallest nonzero nuclear electric quadrupole moment of any stable nucleus.

In 2025, researchers from ETH Zürich and Texas A&M University introduced a mercury-free method for isolating lithium-6, providing an alternative to the COLEX process, which employs mercury. This technique was discovered by accident during water purification research and utilized ζ-V_{2}O_{5} to selectively trap lithium-6 ions, which could be a crucial step in scaling up the production of fusion-grade lithium-6, potentially unlocking more cost-effective and safer ways to isolate lithium for nuclear fusion reactors.

== Lithium-7 ==
Lithium-7 is the most abundant isotope of lithium, making up between 92.2% and 98.1% of all terrestrial lithium. A lithium-7 atom contains three protons, four neutrons, and three electrons. Because of its nuclear properties, lithium-7 is less common than helium, carbon, nitrogen, or oxygen in the Universe, even though the latter three all have heavier nuclei. The Castle Bravo thermonuclear test greatly exceeded its expected yield due to incorrect assumptions about the nuclear properties of lithium-7.

The industrial production of lithium-6 results in a waste product which is enriched in lithium-7 and depleted in lithium-6. This lithium has been sold commercially, and some of it has been released into the environment. A relative abundance of lithium-7 as much as 35 percent greater than the natural value has been measured in the ground water in a carbonate aquifer underneath the West Valley Creek in Pennsylvania, which is downstream from a lithium processing plant.

Lithium-7 is used as a part of the molten lithium fluoride in molten-salt reactors: liquid-fluoride nuclear reactors. The large neutron absorption cross section of lithium-6 (about 940 barns) as compared with the very small neutron cross section of lithium-7 (about 45 millibarns) makes high separation of lithium-7 from natural lithium a strong requirement for the possible use in lithium fluoride reactors.

Lithium-7 hydroxide is used for alkalizing of the coolant in pressurized water reactors.

Some lithium-7 has been produced, for a few picoseconds, which contains a lambda particle in its nucleus, whereas an atomic nucleus is generally thought to contain only neutrons and protons.

== Lithium-8 ==
Lithium-8 undergoes beta decay to beryllium-8 (which rapidly decays to two helium-4 nuclei) with a half-life of 828.9 ms. This has been proposed as a source of unusually high-energy electron antineutrinos, with a maximum energy of 13.0 MeV and an average of 6.7 MeV. The ISODAR particle physics collaboration describes a scheme to generate lithium-8 for this purpose, largely by neutron capture on lithium-7, the intense neutron beam required to be made by high-energy bombardment of beryllium using a cyclotron particle accelerator.

== Lithium-11 ==
Lithium-11 (half-life 8.75 ms) is a halo nucleus consisting of a lithium-9 core surrounded by two loosely-bound neutrons; both neutrons must be present in order for this system to be bound, which has led to the description as a "Borromean nucleus". While the proton root-mean-square radius of ^{11}Li is 2.18+0.16
−0.21 fm, its neutron radius is much larger at 3.34+0.02
−0.08 fm; for comparison, the corresponding figures for ^{9}Li are 2.076±0.037 fm for the protons and 2.4±0.03 fm for the neutrons. It usually decays by beta and neutron emission to ^{10}Be, but can also emit other particles, or no particle, after its decay; there are a total of six other ways that have been measured, given in the table above.

Having a magic number of 8 neutrons, lithium-11 sits on the first of five known islands of inversion, which explains its longer half-life compared to adjacent nuclei.

== Decay chains ==
While β^{−} decay into isotopes of beryllium (often combined with single- or multiple-neutron emission) is predominant in heavier isotopes of lithium, ^{10}Li and ^{12}Li decay via neutron emission into ^{9}Li and ^{11}Li respectively due to their positions beyond the neutron drip line. Lithium-11 has also been observed to decay by seven different beta-decay reactions. Isotopes lighter than ^{6}Li decay exclusively by proton emission into isotopes of helium, as they are beyond the proton drip line.

$$\begin{array}{l}{}\\
\ce{^4_3Li ->[91~\ce{ys}] {^3_2He} + {^1_1H}} \\
\ce{^5_3Li ->[370~\ce{ys}] {^4_2He} + {^1_1H}} \\
\ce{^8_3Li ->[838.7~\ce{ms}] {^8_4Be} + e^-} \\
\ce{^9_3Li ->[178.2~\ce{ms}] {^8_4Be} + {^1_0n} + e^-} \\
\ce{^9_3Li ->[178.2~\ce{ms}] {^9_4Be} + e^-} \\
\ce{^{10}_3Li ->[2~\ce{zs}] {^9_3Li} + {^1_0n}} \\
\ce{^{11}_3Li ->[8.75~\ce{ms}] {^{10}_4Be} + {^1_0n} + e^-} \\
\ce{^{11}_3Li ->[8.75~\ce{ms}] {^{11}_4Be} + e^-} \\
\ce{^{11}_3Li ->[8.75~\ce{ms}] {^9_4Be} + 2{^1_0n} + e^-} \\
\ce{^{11}_3Li ->[8.75~\ce{ms}] {^8_4Be} + 3{^1_0n} + e^-} \\
\ce{^{11}_3Li ->[8.75~\ce{ms}] {^7_2He} + {^4_2He} + e^-} \\
\ce{^{11}_3Li ->[8.75~\ce{ms}] {^8_3Li} + {^3_1H} + e^-} \\
\ce{^{11}_3Li ->[8.75~\ce{ms}] {^9_3Li} + {^2_1H} + e^-} \\
\ce{^{12}_3Li -> {^{11}_3Li} + {^1_0n}} \\{}
\end{array}$$

== See also ==
- Cosmological lithium problem
- Dilithium – Diatomic molecule
- Halo nucleus
- Lithium burning – Process by which lithium is spent in a star
