= Isotopes of helium =

Isotopes of helium (_{2}He)
| Main isotopes | | | Decay | |
| Isotope | abundance | half-life (t_{1/2}) | mode | product |
|---|---|---|---|---|
| ^{3}He | 0.0002% | stable | | |
| ^{4}He | 99.9998% | stable | | |

Standard atomic weight A_{r}°(He)
- 4.002602±0.000002; 4.0026±0.0001 (abridged)

Helium (_{2}He) has nine known isotopes, but only helium-3 (^{3}He) and helium-4 (^{4}He) are stable. All radioisotopes are short-lived; the only particle-bound ones are ^{6}He and ^{8}He with half-lives 806.9 and 119.5 milliseconds.

In Earth's atmosphere, the ratio of ^{3}He to ^{4}He is 1.37×10^{−6}. However, the isotopic abundance of helium varies greatly depending on its origin, though helium-4 is always in great preponderance. In the Local Interstellar Cloud, the proportion of ^{3}He to ^{4}He is 1.62(29)×10^{−4}, which is about 120 times higher than in Earth's atmosphere. Rocks from Earth's crust have isotope ratios varying by as much as a factor of ten; this is used in geology to investigate the origin of rocks and the composition of the Earth's mantle. The different formation processes of the two stable isotopes of helium produce the differing isotope abundances.

Equal mixtures of liquid ^{3}He and ^{4}He below 0.8 K separate into two immiscible phases due to differences in quantum statistics: ^{4}He atoms are bosons while ^{3}He atoms are fermions. Dilution refrigerators take advantage of the immiscibility of these two isotopes to achieve temperatures as low as a few millikelvin.

A mix of the two isotopes spontaneously separates into ^{3}He-rich and ^{4}He-rich regions. Phase separation also exists in ultracold gas systems. It has been shown experimentally in a two-component ultracold Fermi gas case. The phase separation can compete with other phenomena as vortex lattice formation or an exotic Fulde–Ferrell–Larkin–Ovchinnikov phase.

== List of isotopes ==
| Nuclide | Z | N | Isotopic mass (Da) (Note: ( ) – Uncertainty (1σ) is given in concise form in parentheses after the corresponding last digits.) | Discovery year | Half-life [resonance width] | Decay mode (Note: Modes of decay: n: / Neutron emission; p: / Proton emission) | Daughter isotope (Note: Bold symbol as daughter – Daughter product is stable.) | Spin and parity (Note: ( ) spin value – Indicates spin with weak assignment arguments.) (Note: # – Values marked # are not purely derived from experimental data, but at least partly from trends of neighboring nuclides (TNN).) | Natural abundance (mole fraction) | |
| Nuclide | Z | N | Isotopic mass (Da) | Discovery year | Half-life [resonance width] | Decay mode | Daughter isotope | Spin and parity | Normal proportion | Range of variation |
|---|---|---|---|---|---|---|---|---|---|---|
| ^{2}He (Note: Intermediate in the proton–proton chain) | 2 | 0 | 2.015894(2) | 1936 | | p (> 99.99%) | ^{1}H | 0+# | | |
| ^{2}He | 2 | 0 | 2.015894(2) | 1936 | | β^{+} (< 0.01%) | ^{2}H | 0+# | | |
| ^{3}He (Note: Produced in Big Bang nucleosynthesis) (Note: This and ^{1}H are the only stable nuclei with more protons than neutrons) | 2 | 1 | 3.016029321967(60) | 1934 | Stable | | | 1/2+ | 0.000002(2) | [4.6×10^{−10}, 0.000041] |
| ^{4}He (Note: Produced in alpha decay) | 2 | 2 | 4.002603254130(158) | 1908 | Stable | | | 0+ | 0.999998(2) | [0.999959, 1.000000] |
| ^{5}He | 2 | 3 | 5.012057(21) | 1937 | 6.02(22)×10^{−22} s [758(28) keV] | n | ^{4}He | 3/2− | | |
| ^{6}He (Note: Has 2 halo neutrons) | 2 | 4 | 6.018885889(57) | 1936 | 806.92(24) ms | β^{−} (99.999722(18)%) | ^{6}Li | 0+ | | |
| ^{6}He | 2 | 4 | 6.018885889(57) | 1936 | 806.92(24) ms | β^{−}d (Note: d: Deuteron emission) (0.000278(18)%) | ^{4}He | 0+ | | |
| ^{7}He | 2 | 5 | 7.027991(8) | 1967 | 2.51(7)×10^{−21} s [182(5) keV] | n | ^{6}He | (3/2)− | | |
| ^{8}He (Note: Has 4 halo neutrons) | 2 | 6 | 8.033934388(95) | 1965 | 119.5(1.5) ms | β^{−} (83.1(1.0)%) | ^{8}Li | 0+ | | |
| ^{8}He | 2 | 6 | 8.033934388(95) | 1965 | 119.5(1.5) ms | β^{−}n (16(1)%) | ^{7}Li | 0+ | | |
| ^{8}He | 2 | 6 | 8.033934388(95) | 1965 | 119.5(1.5) ms | β^{−}t (Note: t: Triton emission) (0.9(1)%) | ^{5}He | 0+ | | |
| ^{9}He | 2 | 7 | 9.043946(50) | 1987 | 2.5(2.3)×10^{−21} s | n | ^{8}He | 1/2(+) | | |
| ^{10}He | 2 | 8 | 10.05281531(10) | 1994 | 2.60(40)×10^{−22} s [1.76(27) MeV] | 2n | ^{8}He | 0+ | | |
This table header & footer:

== Helium-2 (diproton) ==
Helium-2, ^{2}He, is unbound. The only bound atom with a mass number of 2 is deuterium. The nucleus of ^{2}He, a diproton, consists of two protons with no neutrons. Its instability is due to spin–spin interactions in the nuclear force and the Pauli exclusion principle, which states that within a given quantum system two or more identical particles with the same half-integer spins (fermions) cannot simultaneously occupy the same quantum state; so ^{2}He's two protons have opposite-aligned spins and the diproton itself has negative binding energy.

A rare form of radioactivity is diproton emission, where a nucleus emits two protons in a quasi-bound ^{1}S_{0} configuration, which then separate. In 2000, Oak Ridge National Laboratory detected two-proton emission from ^{18}_{10}Ne, produced by a ^{17}_{9}F ion beam onto a proton-rich target. But the experiment didn't have the sensitivity to distinguish if the emission was a decay by two separate protons, or by a diproton. In 2008, the Istituto Nazionale di Fisica Nucleare confirmed ^{18}Ne decayed to a diproton with a 31% branching ratio. Several experiments have since detected diproton emission from other isotopes.

The lack of a bound diproton has been used to argue for fine-tuning for the development of life due to its effect on Big Bang nucleosynthesis and stellar evolution. Hypothetical models suggest that if the strong force was 2% greater, then diprotons would be bound (but still β^{+} decay to deuterium). Recent studies have found that a universe with bound diprotons doesn’t preclude the development of stars and life.

One impact of a hypothetical bound diproton is a change to the early steps of the proton-proton chain. In our universe, the first step of the proton-proton chain proceeds via the weak force,

p + p → ^{2}_{1}D + e^{+} + ν_{e} + 0.42 MeV

In the hypothetical, instead a diproton could form without the weak force,

p + p → ^{2}_{2}He

The diproton would then beta-plus decay into deuterium:

^{2}_{2}He → ^{2}_{1}D + e^{+} + ν_{e}.

With the overall formula,

p + p → ^{2}_{1}D + e^{+} + ν_{e}.

Under the influence of electromagnetic interactions, the Jaffe-Low primitives may leave the unitary cut, creating narrow two-nucleon resonances, like a diproton resonance with a mass of 2000 MeV and a width of a few hundred keV. To search for this resonance, a beam of protons with kinetic energy 250 MeV and an energy spread below 100 keV is required, which is feasible considering the electron cooling of the beam.

== Helium-3 ==
^{3}He is the only stable isotope other than ^{1}H with more protons than neutrons. There are many such unstable isotopes, such as ^{7}Be and ^{8}B. There is only a trace (~2ppm) of ^{3}He on Earth, mainly present since the formation of the Earth, although some falls to Earth trapped in cosmic dust. Trace amounts are also produced by the beta decay of tritium. In stars, however, ^{3}He is more abundant, a product of nuclear fusion. Extraplanetary material, such as lunar and asteroid regolith, has traces of ^{3}He from solar wind bombardment.

To become superfluid, ^{3}He must be cooled to 2.5 millikelvin, ~900 times lower than ^{4}He (2.17 K). This difference is explained by quantum statistics: ^{3}He atoms are fermions, while ^{4}He atoms are bosons, which condense to a superfluid more easily.

== Helium-4 ==
The most common isotope, ^{4}He, is produced on Earth by alpha decay of heavier elements; the alpha particles that emerge are fully ionized ^{4}He nuclei. ^{4}He is an unusually stable nucleus because it is doubly magic. It was formed in enormous quantities in Big Bang nucleosynthesis.

Terrestrial helium consists almost exclusively (all but ~2ppm) of ^{4}He. ^{4}He's boiling point of 4.2 K is the lowest of all known substances except ^{3}He. When cooled further to 2.17 K, it becomes a unique superfluid with zero viscosity. It solidifies only at pressures above 25 atmospheres, where it melts at 0.95 K.

== Helium-5 ==
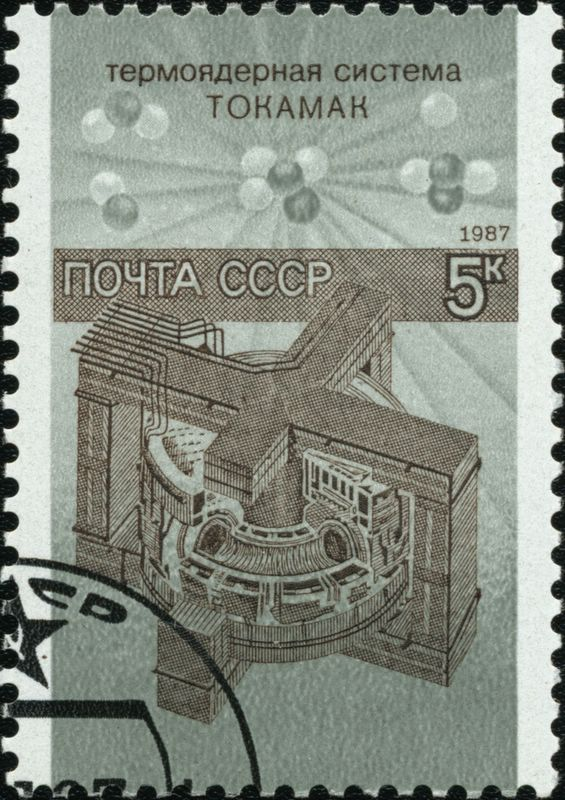
A 1987 Soviet stamp celebrating the T-15 tokamak depicts the helium-5 nucleus during deuterium–tritium fusion

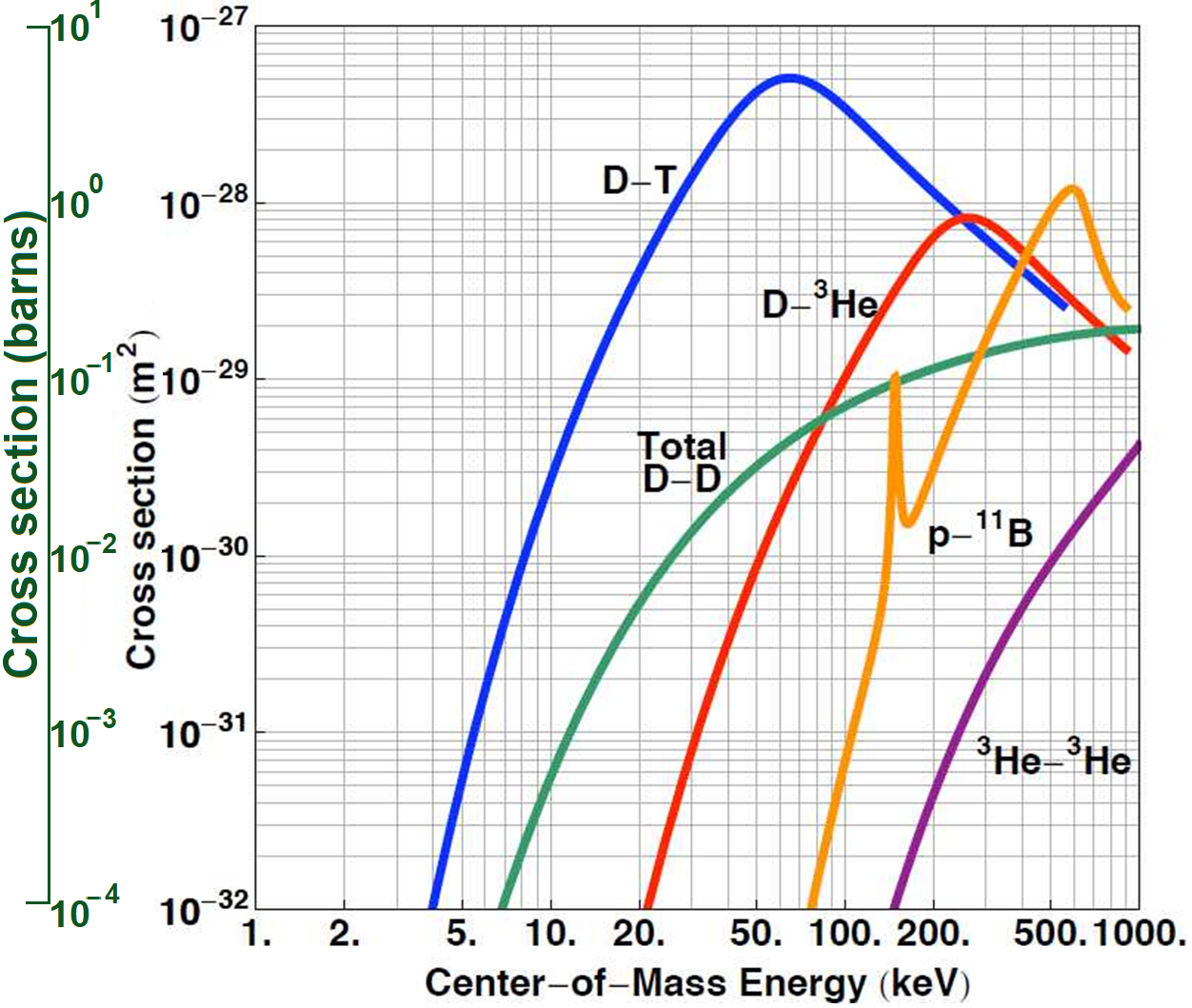
Fusion cross sections of major reactions. Without the resonance in helium-5, the DT reaction would be similar to the DD reaction.

Helium-5 is extremely unstable, decaying to helium-4 with a half-life of 602 yoctoseconds by neutron emission. It is briefly produced in the favorable fusion reaction:

${}^2\mathrm{H} + {}^3\mathrm{H} \longrightarrow {}^5\mathrm{He}^{*} \longrightarrow {}^4\mathrm{He} + n + 17.6\ \mathrm{MeV}$

The reaction is greatly enhanced by the existence of a resonance. Helium-5, which has a natural spin state of 3/2− at the ground state, has a 3/2+ excited spin state at 16.84 MeV. The reaction creates more frequently helium-5 nuclei in the excited state, since its energy is close to the energy released by the reaction. This was discovered by Egon Bretscher, who was investigating weaponization of fusion reactions for the Manhattan Project.

The DT reaction specifically is 100 times more likely than the DD reaction at relevant energies, but would be similar without the resonance. The ^{2}H-^{3}He reaction benefits from a similar resonance in lithium-5, but is Coulomb-suppressed, i.e., the +2 helium nucleus charge increases the electrostatic repulsion for fusing nuclei.

== Helium-6 and helium-8 ==
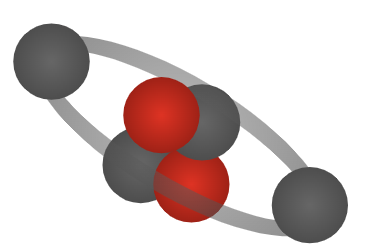
An illustration of the helium-6 nucleus

These are the long-lived radioactive isotopes of helium; helium-6 beta decays with a half-life of 806.9 milliseconds, and helium-8 with a half-life of 119.5 milliseconds, though additional particle emission is possible and significant for the latter. ^{6}He and ^{8}He are thought to consist of a normal ^{4}He nucleus surrounded by a neutron "halo" (of two neutrons in ^{6}He and four neutrons in ^{8}He). The unusual structures of halo nuclei may offer insights into the isolated properties of neutrons and physics beyond the Standard Model.

== See also ==
Daughter products other than helium

- Isotopes of lithium
- Isotopes of hydrogen
