= Isotopic abundance =

Relative proportion of an isotope as found in nature

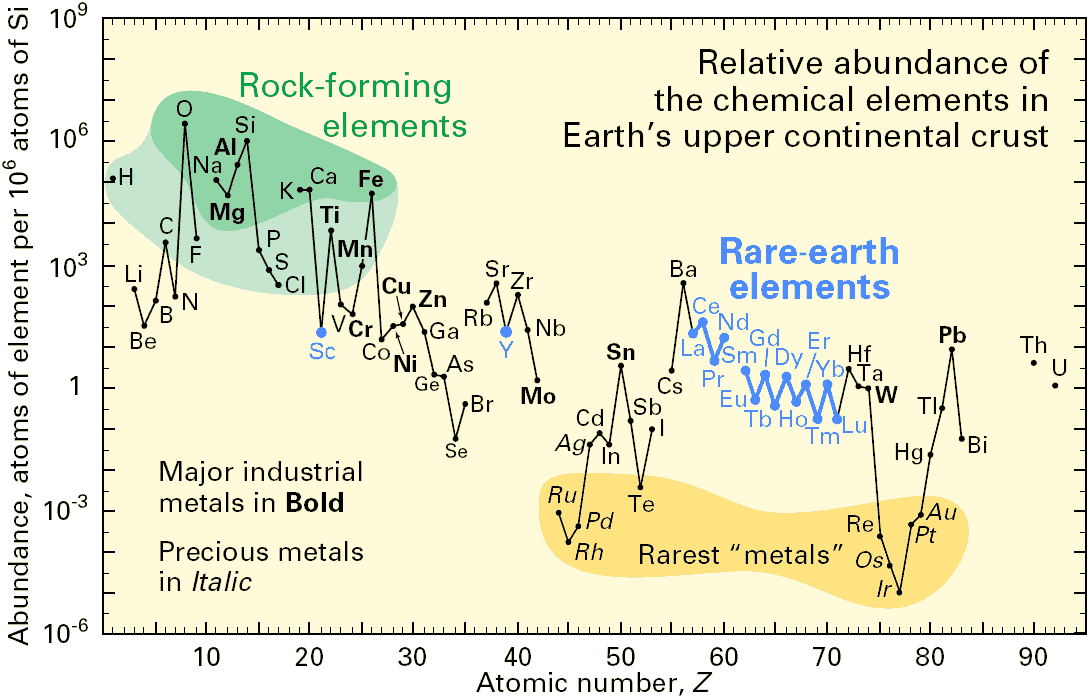
Relative abundance of elements in the Earth's upper crust

In physics, isotopic abundance is the amount of one particular isotope of a chemical element as a fraction of all the atoms in that element in a sample. In a sample representing the naturally occurring isotopes, it is called the natural isotopic abundance, or natural abundance (NA) when the context is clear. The relative atomic mass (a weighted average, weighted by mole-fraction abundance figures) of these isotopes is the atomic weight listed for the element in the periodic table. The abundance of an isotope varies from planet to planet, and even from place to place on the Earth, but remains relatively constant in time (on a short-term scale).

As an example, uranium has three naturally occurring isotopes: ^{238}U, ^{235}U, and ^{234}U. Their respective natural mole-fraction abundances are 99.2739–99.2752%, 0.7198–0.7202%, and 0.0050–0.0059%. For example, if 100,000 uranium atoms were analyzed, one would expect to find approximately 99,274 ^{238}U atoms, approximately 720 ^{235}U atoms, and very few (most likely 5 or 6) ^{234}U atoms. This is because ^{238}U is much more stable than ^{235}U or ^{234}U, as the half-life of each isotope reveals: 4.468 billion years for ^{238}U compared with 7.038 × 10^{8} years for ^{235}U and 245,500 years for ^{234}U.

Exactly because the different uranium isotopes have different half-lives, when the Earth was younger, the isotopic composition of uranium was different. As an example, 1.7 billion years ago the NA of ^{235}U was 3.1% compared with today's 0.7%, and that allowed a natural nuclear fission reactor to form, something that cannot happen today.

However, the natural abundance of a given isotope is also affected by the probability of its creation in nucleosynthesis (as in the case of samarium; radioactive ^{147}Sm and ^{148}Sm are much more abundant than stable ^{144}Sm) and by production of a given isotope as a daughter of natural radioactive isotopes (as in the case of radiogenic isotopes of lead).

== Standards body ==
The Commission on Isotopic Abundances and Atomic Weights (CIAAW) part of the International Union of Pure and Applied Chemistry (IUPAC) compiles and publishes tables of isotopic abundance. These tables provide data for standard atomic weights also published by this commission. They report data derived from normal material which they define as

“The material is a reasonably possible source for this element or its compounds in commerce, for industry or science; the material is not itself studied for some extraordinary anomaly and its isotopic composition has not been modified significantly in a geologically brief period.”

Experimentally the isotopic abundance in different samples of normal material varies and as a consequence the commission reports a range of values called intervals for the isotopic abundance. The latest report was published in 2013.

== Relation to relative atomic mass ==
The average mass of an atom of an element is the result of averaging over each isotope mass, weighted by its abundance in a material. The relative atomic mass (aka atomic weight) is the average mass expressed as a ratio to the atomic mass unit, $1/12$ the mass of ^{12}C. This atomic weight ($A$) in any given material ($P$) is derived from the isotopic abundances of that element ($E$) in the material via
$$A(E) = \sum_i x_P(^iE) A(^iE)$$
where $x_P(^iE)$ is the isotopic abundance of the isotope $^iE$ in the material. When applied to normal terrestrial material (as defined by CIAAW), the result is called the standard atomic weight. The sum runs over all the stable isotopes of an element and any radioactive isotopes with long half-lives which normally appear in measurements.

== Measuring differences ==
High precision measurements of isotopic abundance is difficult due to instrumental fluctations over time. Consequently analytic applications of isotopic abundance measure isotopic ratios as differences from a standard sample measured at the same time. For example, Vienna Standard Mean Ocean Water is distilled ocean water distributed by the International Atomic Energy Agency in Vienna, Austria. These measurements are widely used in many fields including geochemistry and archaeology.

== Deviations from natural abundance ==
It is now known from study of the Sun and primitive meteorites that the Solar System was initially almost homogeneous in isotopic composition. Deviations from the (evolving) galactic average, locally sampled around the time that the Sun's nuclear burning began, can generally be accounted for by mass fractionation (see the article on mass-independent fractionation) plus a limited number of nuclear decay and transmutation processes. There is also evidence for injection of short-lived (now-extinct) isotopes from a nearby supernova explosion that may have triggered solar nebula collapse. Hence deviations from natural abundance on Earth are often measured in parts per thousand (per mille or ‰) because they are less than one percent (%).

An exception to this lies with the presolar grains found in primitive meteorites. These small grains condensed in the outflows of evolved ("dying") stars and escaped the mixing and homogenization processes in the interstellar medium and the solar accretion disk (also known as the solar nebula or protoplanetary disk). As stellar condensates ("stardust"), these grains carry the isotopic signatures of specific nucleosynthesis processes in which their elements were made. In these materials, deviations from "natural abundance" are sometimes measured in factors of 100.

== Some natural isotope abundances ==
The next table gives the terrestrial isotope distributions for some elements. Some elements, such as phosphorus and fluorine, only exist as a single isotope, with a natural abundance of 100%.

Natural isotope abundance
Isotope	% abundance	atomic mass
^{1}H	99.985	1.007825
^{2}H	0.015	2.0140
^{12}C	98.89	12 (formerly by definition)
^{13}C	1.11	13.00335
^{14}N	99.64	14.00307
^{15}N	0.36	15.00011
^{16}O	99.76	15.99491
^{17}O	0.04	16.99913
^{18}O	0.2	17.99916
^{28}Si	92.23	27.97693
^{29}Si	4.67	28.97649
^{30}Si	3.10	29.97376
^{32}S	95.0	31.97207
^{33}S	0.76	32.97146
^{34}S	4.22	33.96786
^{35}Cl	75.77	34.96885
^{37}Cl	24.23	36.96590
^{79}Br	50.69	78.9183
^{81}Br	49.31	80.9163

== History ==
In 1919, Fred Aston invented the mass spectrometric detector and quickly was able to determine that some elements had many isotopes. By 1931 Harold Urey and Charles A. Bradley, Jr. showed that different isotopes show slightly different chemistry, allowing chemistry to alter isotopic abundance.

== See also ==
- Abundance of the chemical elements
- Decay product
- Isotope
- Presolar grains
- Radionuclide
