= Calcium =

Calcium, _{20}Ca

Calcium
- Appearance: dull gray, silver; with a pale yellow tint

Standard atomic weight A_{r}°(Ca)
- 40.078±0.004; 40.078±0.004 (abridged)

Calcium in the periodic table
Hydrogen																															Helium
Lithium	Beryllium																									Boron	Carbon	Nitrogen	Oxygen	Fluorine	Neon
Sodium	Magnesium																									Aluminium	Silicon	Phosphorus	Sulfur	Chlorine	Argon
Potassium	Calcium															Scandium	Titanium	Vanadium	Chromium	Manganese	Iron	Cobalt	Nickel	Copper	Zinc	Gallium	Germanium	Arsenic	Selenium	Bromine	Krypton
Rubidium	Strontium															Yttrium	Zirconium	Niobium	Molybdenum	Technetium	Ruthenium	Rhodium	Palladium	Silver	Cadmium	Indium	Tin	Antimony	Tellurium	Iodine	Xenon
Caesium	Barium	Lanthanum	Cerium	Praseodymium	Neodymium	Promethium	Samarium	Europium	Gadolinium	Terbium	Dysprosium	Holmium	Erbium	Thulium	Ytterbium	Lutetium	Hafnium	Tantalum	Tungsten	Rhenium	Osmium	Iridium	Platinum	Gold	Mercury (element)	Thallium	Lead	Bismuth	Polonium	Astatine	Radon
Francium	Radium	Actinium	Thorium	Protactinium	Uranium	Neptunium	Plutonium	Americium	Curium	Berkelium	Californium	Einsteinium	Fermium	Mendelevium	Nobelium	Lawrencium	Rutherfordium	Dubnium	Seaborgium	Bohrium	Hassium	Meitnerium	Darmstadtium	Roentgenium	Copernicium	Nihonium	Flerovium	Moscovium	Livermorium	Tennessine	Oganesson
Mg
↑
Ca
↓
Sr
potassium ← calcium → scandium
- Atomic number (Z): 20
- Group: group 2 (alkaline earth metals)
- Period: period 4
- Block: s-block
- Electron configuration: [Ar] 4s^{2}
- Electrons per shell: 2, 8, 8, 2

Physical properties
- Phase at STP: solid
- Melting point: 1115 K (842 °C, 1548 °F)
- Boiling point: 1757 K (1484 °C, 2703 °F)
- Density (at 20° C): 1.526 g/cm^{3}
- when liquid (at m.p.): 1.378 g/cm^{3}
- Heat of fusion: 8.54 kJ/mol
- Heat of vaporisation: 154.7 kJ/mol
- Molar heat capacity: 25.929 J/(mol·K)
- Specific heat capacity: 646.963 J/(kg·K)
Vapour pressure
P (Pa)	1	10	100	1 k	10 k	100 k
at T (K)	864	956	1071	1227	1443	1755

Atomic properties
- Oxidation states: common: +2 +1
- Electronegativity: Pauling scale: 1.00
- Ionisation energies: 1st: 589.8 kJ/mol; 2nd: 1145.4 kJ/mol; 3rd: 4912.4 kJ/mol; (more)
- Atomic radius: empirical: 197 pm
- Covalent radius: 176±10 pm
- Van der Waals radius: 231 pm
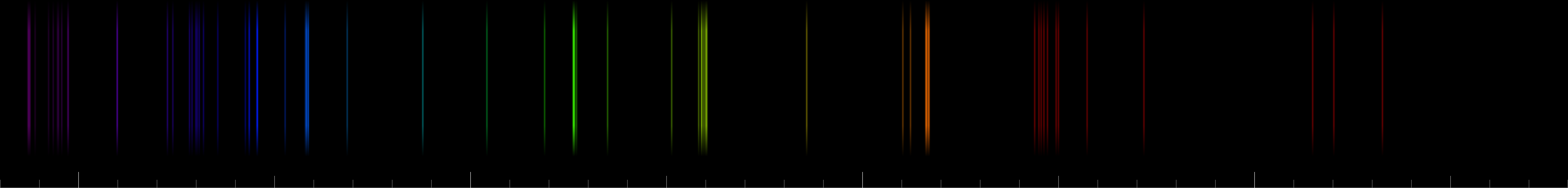
- Spectral lines of calcium

Other properties
- Natural occurrence: primordial
- Crystal structure: face-centred cubic (fcc) (cF4)
- Lattice constant: a = 558.8 pm (at 20 °C)
- Thermal expansion: 22.27×10^{−6}/K (at 20 °C)
- Thermal conductivity: 201 W/(m⋅K)
- Electrical resistivity: 33.6 nΩ⋅m (at 20 °C)
- Magnetic ordering: diamagnetic
- Molar magnetic susceptibility: +40.0×10^{−6} cm^{3}/mol
- Young's modulus: 20 GPa
- Shear modulus: 7.4 GPa
- Bulk modulus: 17 GPa
- Speed of sound thin rod: 3810 m/s (at 20 °C)
- Poisson ratio: 0.31
- Mohs hardness: 1.75
- Brinell hardness: 170–416 MPa
- CAS Number: 7440-70-2

History
- Naming: from the Latin word for lime, calx
- Discovery and first isolation: Humphry Davy (1808)

Isotopes of calcium
Main isotopes			Decay	
Isotope	abundance	half-life (t_{1/2})	mode	product
^{40}Ca	96.9%	stable		
^{41}Ca	trace	9.94×10^{4} y	ε	^{41}K
^{42}Ca	0.647%	stable		
^{43}Ca	0.135%	stable		
^{44}Ca	2.09%	stable		
^{45}Ca	synth	162.61 d	β^{−}	^{45}Sc
^{46}Ca	0.004%	stable		
^{47}Ca	synth	4.536 d	β^{−}	^{47}Sc
^{48}Ca	0.187%	5.6×10^{19} y	β^{−}β^{−}	^{48}Ti

Calcium is a chemical element; it has symbol Ca and atomic number 20. As an alkaline earth metal, calcium is a reactive metal that forms a dark oxide-nitride layer when exposed to air. Its physical and chemical properties are most similar to its heavier homologues strontium and barium. It is the fifth most abundant element in Earth's crust, and the third most abundant metal, after iron and aluminium. The most common calcium compound on Earth is calcium carbonate, found in limestone and the fossils of early sea life; gypsum, anhydrite, fluorite, and apatite are also sources of calcium. The name comes from the Latin word calx (meaning "lime"), which was obtained from heating limestone.

Some calcium compounds were known to the ancients, though their chemistry was unknown until the seventeenth century. Pure calcium was isolated in 1808 via electrolysis of its oxide by Humphry Davy, who named the element. Calcium compounds are widely used in many industries: in foods and pharmaceuticals for calcium supplementation, in the paper industry as bleaches, as components in cement and electrical insulators, and in the manufacture of soaps. On the other hand, the metal in pure form has few applications due to its high reactivity; still, in small quantities it is often used as an alloying component in steelmaking, and sometimes, as a calcium–lead alloy, in making automotive batteries.

Calcium is the most abundant metal and the fifth-most abundant element in the human body. As electrolytes, calcium ions (Ca^{2+}) play a vital role in the physiological and biochemical processes of organisms and cells: in signal transduction pathways where they act as a second messenger; in neurotransmitter release from neurons; in contraction of all muscle cell types; as cofactors in many enzymes; and in fertilization. Calcium ions outside cells are important for maintaining the potential difference across excitable cell membranes, protein synthesis, and bone formation.

== Characteristics ==
=== Classification ===
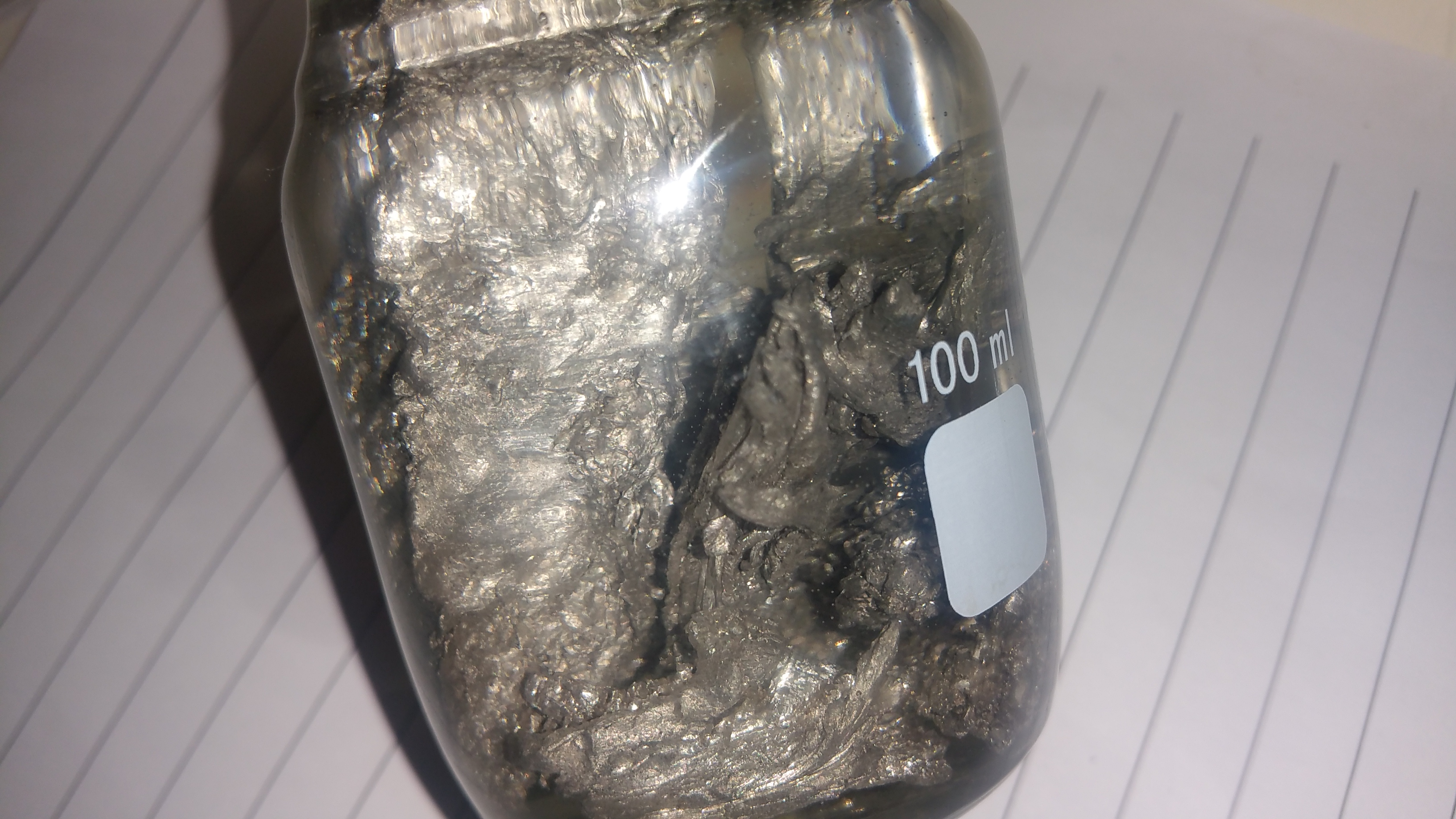
Calcium crystals stored in mineral oil

Calcium is a very ductile silvery metal (sometimes described as pale yellow) whose properties are very similar to the heavier elements in its group, strontium, barium, and radium. A calcium atom has 20 electrons, with electron configuration [Ar]4s^{2}. Like the other elements in group 2 of the periodic table, calcium has two valence electrons in the outermost s-orbital, which are very easily lost in chemical reactions to form a dipositive ion with the stable electron configuration of a noble gas, in this case argon.

Hence, calcium is almost always divalent in its compounds, which are usually ionic. Hypothetical univalent salts of calcium would be stable with respect to their elements, but not to disproportionation to the divalent salts and calcium metal, because the enthalpy of formation of MX_{2} is much higher than those of the hypothetical MX. This occurs because of the much greater lattice energy afforded by the more highly charged Ca^{2+} cation compared to the hypothetical Ca^{+} cation.

Calcium, strontium, barium, and radium are always considered to be alkaline earth metals; the lighter beryllium and magnesium, also in group 2 of the periodic table, are often included as well. Nevertheless, beryllium and magnesium differ significantly from the other members of the group in their physical and chemical behavior: they behave more like aluminium and zinc respectively and have some of the weaker metallic character of the post-transition metals, which is why the traditional definition of the term "alkaline earth metal" excludes them.

=== Physical properties ===
Calcium metal melts at 842 °C and boils at 1494 °C; these values are higher than those for magnesium and strontium, the neighbouring group 2 metals. It crystallises in the face-centered cubic arrangement like strontium and barium; above 443 °C (716 K), it changes to body-centered cubic. Its density of 1.526 g/cm^{3} (at 20 °C) is the lowest in its group.

Calcium is harder than lead but can be cut with a knife with effort. While calcium is a poorer conductor of electricity than copper or aluminium by volume, it is a better conductor by mass than both due to its very low density. While calcium is infeasible as a conductor for most terrestrial applications as it reacts quickly with atmospheric oxygen, its use as such in space has been considered.

=== Chemical properties ===
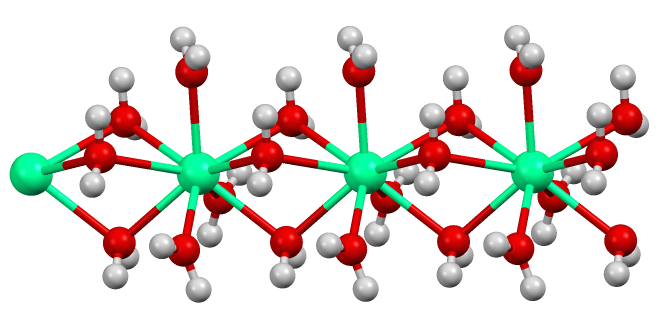
Structure of the polymeric [Ca(H_{2}O)_{6}]^{2+} center in hydrated calcium chloride, illustrating the high coordination number typical for calcium complexes.

The chemistry of calcium is that of a typical heavy alkaline earth metal. For example, calcium spontaneously reacts with water more quickly than magnesium but less quickly than strontium to produce calcium hydroxide and hydrogen gas. It also reacts with the oxygen and nitrogen in air to form a mixture of calcium oxide and calcium nitride. When finely divided, it spontaneously burns in air to produce the nitride. Bulk calcium is less reactive: it quickly forms a hydration coating in moist air, but below 30% relative humidity it may be stored indefinitely at room temperature.

Besides the simple oxide CaO, calcium peroxide, CaO_{2}, can be made by direct oxidation of calcium metal under a high pressure of oxygen, and there is some evidence for a yellow superoxide Ca(O_{2})_{2}.Calcium hydroxide, Ca(OH)_{2}, is a strong base, though not as strong as the hydroxides of strontium, barium or the alkali metals. All four dihalides of calcium are known. Calcium carbonate (CaCO_{3}) and calcium sulfate (CaSO_{4}) are particularly abundant minerals. Like strontium and barium, as well as the alkali metals and the divalent lanthanides europium and ytterbium, calcium metal dissolves directly in liquid ammonia to give a dark blue solution.

Due to the large size of the calcium ion (Ca^{2+}), high coordination numbers are common, up to 24 in some intermetallic compounds such as CaZn_{13}. Calcium is readily complexed by oxygen chelates such as EDTA and polyphosphates, which are useful in analytic chemistry and removing calcium ions from hard water. In the absence of steric hindrance, smaller group 2 cations tend to form stronger complexes, but when large polydentate macrocycles are involved the trend is reversed.

==== Organocalcium compounds ====
In contrast to organomagnesium compounds, organocalcium compounds are not similarly useful, with one major exception, calcium carbide, CaC_{2}. This material, which has historic significance, is prepared by heating calcium oxide with carbon. According to X-ray crystallography, calcium carbide can be described as Ca^{2+} derivative of acetylide, C_{2}^{2-}, although it is not a salt. Several million tons of calcium carbide are produced annually. Hydrolysis gives acetylene, which is used in welding and a chemical precursor. Reaction with nitrogen gas converts calcium carbide to calcium cyanamide.

A dominant theme in molecular organocalcium chemistry is the large radius of calcium, which often leads to high coordination numbers. For example, dimethylcalcium appears to be a 3-dimensional polymer, whereas dimethylmagnesium is a linear polymer with tetrahedral Mg centers. Bulky ligands are often required to disfavor polymeric species. For example, calcium dicyclopentadienyl, Ca(C_{5}H_{5})_{2} has a polymeric structure and thus is nonvolatile and insoluble in solvents. Replacing the C_{5}H_{5} ligand with the bulkier C_{5}(CH_{3})_{5} (pentamethylcyclopentadienyl) gives a soluble complex that sublimes and forms well-defined adducts with ethers. Organocalcium compounds tend to be more similar to organoytterbium compounds due to the similar ionic radii of Yb^{2+} (102 pm) and Ca^{2+} (100 pm).

Organocalcium compounds have been well investigated. Some such complexes exhibit catalytic properties, although none have been commercialized.

=== Isotopes ===
Natural calcium is a mixture of five stable isotopes—^{40}Ca, ^{42}Ca, ^{43}Ca, ^{44}Ca, and ^{46}Ca—and ^{48}Ca, whose half-life of 4.3 × 10^{19} years is so long that it can be considered stable for all practical purposes. Calcium is the first (lightest) element to have six naturally occurring isotopes.

By far the most common isotope is ^{40}Ca, which makes up 96.941% of natural calcium. It is produced in the silicon-burning process from fusion of alpha particles and is the heaviest stable nuclide with equal proton and neutron numbers; its occurrence is also supplemented slowly by the decay of primordial ^{40}K. Adding another alpha particle leads to unstable ^{44}Ti, which decays via two successive electron captures to stable ^{44}Ca; this makes up 2.806% of natural calcium and is the second-most common isotope.

The other four natural isotopes, ^{42, 43, 46, 48}Ca, are significantly rarer, each comprising less than 1% of natural calcium. The four lighter isotopes are mainly products of oxygen-burning and silicon-burning, leaving the two heavier ones to be produced via neutron capture. ^{46}Ca is mostly produced in a "hot" s-process, as its formation requires a rather high neutron flux to allow short-lived ^{45}Ca to capture a neutron. ^{48}Ca is produced by electron capture in the r-process in type Ia supernovae, where high neutron excess and low enough entropy ensures its survival.

^{46}Ca and ^{48}Ca are the first "classically stable" nuclides with a 6-neutron or 8-neutron excess respectively. Though extremely neutron-rich for such a light element, ^{48}Ca is very stable because it is a doubly magic nucleus, with 20 protons and 28 neutrons arranged in closed shells. Its beta decay to ^{48}Sc is very hindered by the gross mismatch of nuclear spin: ^{48}Ca has zero nuclear spin, being even–even, while ^{48}Sc has spin 6+, so the decay is forbidden by conservation of angular momentum. While two excited states of ^{48}Sc are available for decay as well, they are also forbidden due to their high spins. As a result, when ^{48}Ca does decay, it does so by double beta decay to ^{48}Ti instead, being the lightest nuclide known to undergo double beta decay.

^{46}Ca can also theoretically double-beta-decay to ^{46}Ti, but this has never been observed. The most common isotope ^{40}Ca is also doubly magic and could undergo double electron capture to ^{40}Ar, but this has likewise never been observed. Calcium is the only element with two primordial doubly magic isotopes. The experimental lower limits for the half-lives of ^{40}Ca and ^{46}Ca are 5.9 × 10^{21} years and 2.8 × 10^{15} years respectively.

Excluding ^{48}Ca, the longest lived radioisotope of calcium is ^{41}Ca. It decays by electron capture to stable ^{41}K with a half-life of about 10^{5} years. Its existence in the early Solar System as an extinct radionuclide has been inferred from excesses of ^{41}K. Traces of ^{41}Ca also still exist today, as it is a cosmogenic nuclide, continuously produced through neutron activation of natural ^{40}Ca.

Many other calcium radioisotopes are known, ranging from ^{35}Ca to ^{60}Ca. They are all much shorter-lived than ^{41}Ca; the most stable are ^{45}Ca (half-life 163 days) and ^{47}Ca (half-life 4.54 days). Isotopes lighter than ^{42}Ca usually undergo beta plus decay to isotopes of potassium, and those heavier than ^{44}Ca usually undergo beta minus decay to scandium; though near the nuclear drip lines, proton emission and neutron emission begin to be significant decay modes as well.

Like other elements, a variety of processes alter the relative abundance of calcium isotopes. The best studied of these processes is the mass-dependent fractionation of calcium isotopes that accompanies the precipitation of calcium minerals such as calcite, aragonite and apatite from solution. Lighter isotopes are preferentially incorporated into these minerals, leaving the surrounding solution enriched in heavier isotopes at a magnitude of roughly 0.025% per atomic mass unit (amu) at room temperature. Mass-dependent differences in calcium isotope composition are conventionally expressed by the ratio of two isotopes (usually ^{44}Ca/^{40}Ca) in a sample compared to the same ratio in a standard reference material. ^{44}Ca/^{40}Ca varies by about 1–2‰ among organisms on Earth.

== History ==
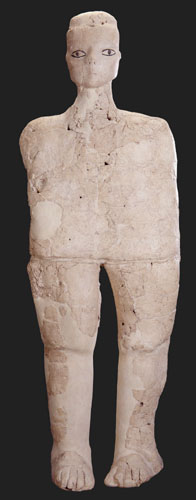
One of the 'Ain Ghazal Statues, made from lime plaster

Calcium compounds were known for millennia, though their chemical makeup was not understood until the 17th century. Lime as a building material and as plaster for statues was used as far back as around 7000 BC. The first dated lime kiln dates back to 2500 BC and was found in Khafajah, Mesopotamia.

About the same time, dehydrated gypsum (CaSO_{4}·2H_{2}O) was being used in the Great Pyramid of Giza. This material would later be used for the plaster in the tomb of Tutankhamun. The ancient Romans instead used lime mortars made by heating limestone (CaCO_{3}). The name "calcium" itself derives from the Latin word calx "lime".

Vitruvius noted that the lime that resulted was lighter than the original limestone, attributing this to the boiling of the water. In 1755, Joseph Black proved that this was due to the loss of carbon dioxide, which as a gas had not been recognised by the ancient Romans.

In 1789, Antoine Lavoisier suspected that lime might be an oxide of an element. In his table of the elements, Lavoisier listed five "salifiable earths" (i.e., ores that could be made to react with acids to produce salts (salis = salt, in Latin): chaux (calcium oxide), magnésie (magnesia, magnesium oxide), baryte (barium sulfate), alumine (alumina, aluminium oxide), and silice (silica, silicon dioxide)). About these "elements", Lavoisier reasoned:

We are probably only acquainted as yet with a part of the metallic substances existing in nature, as all those which have a stronger affinity to oxygen than carbon possesses, are incapable, hitherto, of being reduced to a metallic state, and consequently, being only presented to our observation under the form of oxyds, are confounded with earths. It is extremely probable that barytes, which we have just now arranged with earths, is in this situation; for in many experiments it exhibits properties nearly approaching to those of metallic bodies. It is even possible that all the substances we call earths may be only metallic oxyds, irreducible by any hitherto known process.

Calcium, along with its congeners magnesium, strontium, and barium, was first isolated by Humphry Davy in 1808. Following the work of Jöns Jakob Berzelius and Magnus Martin of Pontin on electrolysis, Davy isolated calcium and magnesium by putting a mixture of the respective metal oxides with mercury(II) oxide on a platinum plate which was used as the anode, the cathode being a platinum wire partially submerged into mercury. Electrolysis then gave calcium–mercury and magnesium–mercury amalgams, and distilling off the mercury gave the metal. However, pure calcium cannot be prepared in bulk by this method and a workable commercial process for its production was not found until over a century later.

== Occurrence and production ==
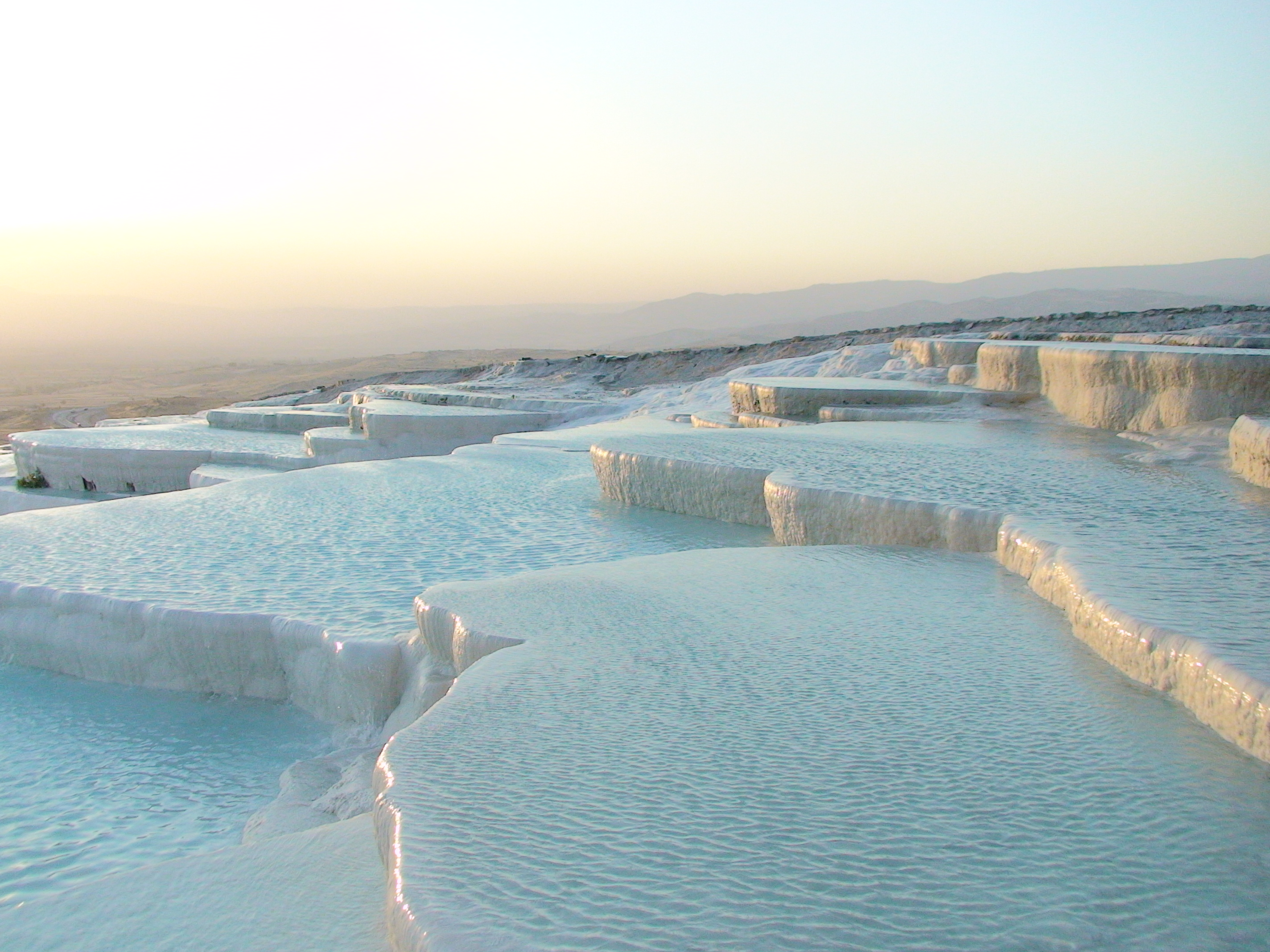
Travertine terraces in Pamukkale, Turkey

At 3%, calcium is the fifth most abundant element in the Earth's crust, and the third most abundant metal behind aluminium and iron. It is also the fourth most abundant element in the lunar highlands. Sedimentary calcium carbonate deposits pervade the Earth's surface as fossilised remains of past marine life; they occur in two forms, the rhombohedral calcite (more common) and the orthorhombic aragonite (forming in more temperate seas). Minerals of the first type include limestone, dolomite, marble, chalk, and Iceland spar; aragonite beds make up the Bahamas, the Florida Keys, and the Red Sea basins. Corals, sea shells, and pearls are mostly made up of calcium carbonate. Among the other important minerals of calcium are gypsum (CaSO_{4}·2H_{2}O), anhydrite (CaSO_{4}), fluorite (CaF_{2}), and apatite ([Ca_{5}(PO_{4})_{3}X], X = OH, Cl, or F)

The major producers of calcium are China (about 10000 to 12000 tonnes per year), Russia (about 6000 to 8000 tonnes per year), and the United States (about 2000 to 4000 tonnes per year). Canada and France are among the minor producers. In 2005, about 24000 tonnes of calcium were produced; about half of the world's extracted calcium is used by the United States, with about 80% of the output used each year.

In Russia and China, Davy's method of electrolysis is still used, but is instead applied to molten calcium chloride. Since calcium is less reactive than strontium or barium, the oxide–nitride coating that results in air is stable and lathe machining and other standard metallurgical techniques are suitable for calcium.

In the U.S. and Canada, calcium is instead produced by reducing lime with aluminium at high temperatures. In this process, powdered high-calcium lime and powdered aluminum are mixed and compacted into briquettes for a high degree of contact, which are then placed in a sealed retort which has been evacuated and heated to ~1200°C. The briquettes release calcium vapor into the vacuum for about 8 hours, which then condenses in the cooled ends of the retorts to form 24-34 kg pieces of calcium metal, as well as some residue of calcium aluminate. High-purity calcium can be obtained by distilling low-purity calcium at high temperatures.

=== Geochemical cycling ===
Calcium cycling provides a link between tectonics, climate, and the carbon cycle. In the simplest terms, mountain-building exposes calcium-bearing rocks such as basalt and granodiorite to chemical weathering and releases Ca^{2+} into surface water. These ions are transported to the ocean where they react with dissolved CO_{2} to form limestone (CaCO_{3}), which in turn settles to the sea floor where it is incorporated into new rocks. Dissolved CO_{2}, along with carbonate and bicarbonate ions, are termed "dissolved inorganic carbon" (DIC).

The actual reaction is more complicated and involves the bicarbonate ion (HCO^{−}_{3}) that forms when CO_{2} reacts with water at seawater pH:

Ca^{2+} + 2 HCO^{−}_{3} → CaCO_{3}↓ + CO_{2} + H_{2}O

At seawater pH, most of the dissolved CO_{2} is immediately converted back into HCO^{−}_{3}. The reaction results in a net transport of one molecule of CO_{2} from the ocean/atmosphere into the lithosphere. The result is that each Ca^{2+} ion released by chemical weathering ultimately removes one CO_{2} molecule from the surficial system (atmosphere, ocean, soil and living organisms), storing it in carbonate rocks where it is likely to stay for hundreds of millions of years. The weathering of calcium from rocks thus scrubs CO_{2} from the ocean and air, exerting a strong long-term effect on climate.

== Applications ==
The largest use of metallic calcium is in steelmaking, due to its strong chemical affinity for chalcogens oxygen and sulfur. Its oxides and sulfides, once formed, give liquid lime aluminate and sulfide inclusions in steel which float out; on treatment, these inclusions disperse throughout the steel and become small and spherical, improving castability, cleanliness and general mechanical properties. Calcium is also used in maintenance-free automotive batteries, in which the use of 0.1% calcium–lead alloys instead of the usual antimony–lead alloys leads to lower water loss and lower self-discharging.

Due to the risk of expansion and cracking, aluminium is sometimes also incorporated into these alloys. These lead–calcium alloys are also used in casting, replacing lead–antimony alloys. Calcium is also used to strengthen aluminium alloys used for bearings, for the control of graphitic carbon in cast iron, and to remove bismuth impurities from lead. Calcium metal is found in some drain cleaners, where it functions to generate heat and calcium hydroxide that saponifies the fats and liquefies the proteins (for example, those in hair) that block drains.

Besides metallurgy, the reactivity of calcium is exploited to remove nitrogen from high-purity argon gas and as a getter for oxygen and nitrogen. It is also used as a reducing agent in the production of chromium, zirconium, thorium, vanadium and uranium. It can also be used to store hydrogen gas, as it reacts with hydrogen to form solid calcium hydride, from which the hydrogen can easily be re-extracted.

Calcium isotope fractionation during mineral formation has led to several applications of calcium isotopes. In particular, the 1997 observation by Skulan and DePaolo that calcium minerals are isotopically lighter than the solutions from which the minerals precipitate is the basis of analogous applications in medicine and in paleoceanography. In animals with skeletons mineralised with calcium, the calcium isotopic composition of soft tissues reflects the relative rate of formation and dissolution of skeletal mineral.

In humans, changes in the calcium isotopic composition of urine have been shown to be related to changes in bone mineral balance. When the rate of bone formation exceeds the rate of bone resorption, the ^{44}Ca/^{40}Ca ratio in soft tissue rises and vice versa. Because of this relationship, calcium isotopic measurements of urine or blood may be useful in the early detection of metabolic bone diseases like osteoporosis.

A similar system exists in seawater, where ^{44}Ca/^{40}Ca tends to rise when the rate of removal of Ca^{2+} by mineral precipitation exceeds the input of new calcium into the ocean. In 1997, Skulan and DePaolo presented the first evidence of change in seawater ^{44}Ca/^{40}Ca over geologic time, along with a theoretical explanation of these changes. More recent papers have confirmed this observation, demonstrating that seawater Ca^{2+} concentration is not constant, and that the ocean is never in a "steady state" with respect to calcium input and output. This has important climatological implications, as the marine calcium cycle is closely tied to the carbon cycle.

Many calcium compounds are used in food, as pharmaceuticals, and in medicine, among others. For example, calcium and phosphorus are supplemented in foods through the addition of calcium lactate, calcium diphosphate, and tricalcium phosphate. The last is also used as a polishing agent in toothpaste and in antacids. Calcium lactobionate is a white powder that is used as a suspending agent for pharmaceuticals. In baking, calcium phosphate is used as a leavening agent. Calcium sulfite is used as a bleach in papermaking and as a disinfectant, calcium silicate is used as a reinforcing agent in rubber, and calcium acetate is a component of liming rosin and is used to make metallic soaps and synthetic resins.

Calcium supplement is on the World Health Organization's List of Essential Medicines.

== Food sources ==
Foods rich in calcium include dairy products such as milk, yogurt, and cheese, as well as sardines, salmon, soy products, kale, and fortified breakfast cereals.

Because of concerns for long-term adverse side effects, including calcification of arteries and kidney stones, both the U.S. Institute of Medicine (IOM) and the European Food Safety Authority (EFSA) set tolerable upper intake levels (ULs) for combined dietary and supplemental calcium. From the IOM, people of ages 9–18 years are not to exceed 3 g/day combined intake; for ages 19–50, not to exceed 2.5 g/day; for ages 51 and older, not to exceed 2 g/day. EFSA set the UL for all adults at 2.5 g/day, but decided the information for children and adolescents was not sufficient to determine ULs.

== Biological and pathological role ==
Age-adjusted daily calcium recommendations (from U.S. Institute of Medicine RDAs)
Age	Calcium (mg/day)
1–3 years	700
4–8 years	1000
9–18 years	1300
19–50 years	1000
>51 years	1000
Pregnancy	1000
Lactation	1000

Global dietary calcium intake among adults (mg/day). <400 400–500 500–600 600–700 700–800 800–900 900–1000 >1000

=== Function ===
Calcium is an essential element needed in large quantities. The Ca^{2+} ion acts as an electrolyte and is vital to the health of the muscular, circulatory, and digestive systems; is indispensable to the building of bone in the form of hydroxyapatite; and supports synthesis and function of blood cells. For example, it regulates the contraction of muscles, nerve conduction, and the clotting of blood. As a result, intra- and extracellular calcium levels are tightly regulated by the body. Calcium can play this role because the Ca^{2+} ion forms stable coordination complexes with many organic compounds, especially proteins; it also forms compounds with a wide range of solubilities, enabling the formation of the skeleton.

=== Binding ===
Calcium ions may be complexed by proteins through binding the carboxyl groups of glutamic acid or aspartic acid residues; through interacting with phosphorylated serine, tyrosine, or threonine residues; or by being chelated by γ-carboxylated amino acid residues. Trypsin, a digestive enzyme, uses the first method; osteocalcin, a bone matrix protein, uses the third.

Some other bone matrix proteins such as osteopontin and bone sialoprotein use both the first and the second. Direct activation of enzymes by binding calcium is common; some other enzymes are activated by noncovalent association with direct calcium-binding enzymes. Calcium also binds to the phospholipid layer of the cell membrane, anchoring proteins associated with the cell surface.

=== Solubility ===
As an example of the wide range of solubility of calcium compounds, monocalcium phosphate is very soluble in water, 85% of extracellular calcium is as dicalcium phosphate with a solubility of 2.00 mM, and the hydroxyapatite of bones in an organic matrix is tricalcium phosphate with a solubility of 1000 μM.

=== Nutrition ===
Calcium is a common constituent of multivitamin dietary supplements, but the composition of calcium complexes in supplements may affect its bioavailability which varies by solubility of the salt involved: calcium citrate, malate, and lactate are highly bioavailable, while the oxalate is less. Other calcium preparations include calcium carbonate, calcium citrate malate, and calcium gluconate. The intestine absorbs about one-third of uncomplexed calcium consumed, and plasma calcium level is then regulated by the kidneys.

=== Hormonal regulation of bone formation and serum levels ===
Parathyroid hormone and vitamin D promote the formation of bone by allowing and enhancing the deposition of calcium ions there, allowing rapid bone turnover without affecting bone mass or mineral content. When plasma calcium levels fall, cell surface receptors are activated and the secretion of parathyroid hormone occurs; it then proceeds to stimulate the entry of calcium into the plasma pool by taking it from targeted kidney, gut, and bone cells, with the bone-forming action of parathyroid hormone being antagonised by calcitonin, whose secretion increases with increasing plasma calcium levels.

=== Abnormal serum levels ===
Excess intake of calcium may cause hypercalcemia. However, because calcium is absorbed rather inefficiently by the intestines, high serum calcium is more likely caused by excessive secretion of parathyroid hormone (PTH) or possibly by excessive intake of vitamin D, both of which facilitate calcium absorption. All these conditions result in excess calcium salts being deposited in the heart, blood vessels, or kidneys. Symptoms include anorexia, nausea, vomiting, memory loss, confusion, muscle weakness, increased urination, dehydration, and metabolic bone disease.

Chronic hypercalcaemia typically leads to calcification of soft tissue and its serious consequences: for example, calcification can cause loss of elasticity of vascular walls and disruption of laminar blood flow—and thence to plaque rupture and thrombosis. Conversely, inadequate calcium or vitamin D intakes may result in hypocalcemia, often caused also by inadequate secretion of parathyroid hormone or defective PTH receptors in cells. Symptoms include neuromuscular excitability, which potentially causes tetany and disruption of conductivity in cardiac tissue.

=== Bone disease ===
As calcium is required for bone development, many bone diseases can be traced to the organic matrix or the hydroxyapatite in molecular structure or organization of bone. Osteoporosis is a reduction in mineral content of bone per unit volume, and can be treated by supplementation of calcium, vitamin D, and bisphosphonates. Inadequate amounts of calcium, vitamin D, or phosphates can lead to softening of bones, called osteomalacia.

== Safety ==
=== Metallic calcium ===
Calcium
Hazards
- GHS labelling
Pictograms	(GHS02: Flammable)
Signal word	Danger
Hazard statements	H261
Precautionary statements	P231+P232
NFPA 704 (fire diamond)	0 3 1 W

Because calcium reacts exothermically with water and acids, calcium metal coming into contact with bodily moisture results in severe corrosive irritation. When swallowed, calcium metal has the same effect on the mouth, oesophagus, and stomach, and can be fatal. However, long-term exposure is not known to have distinct adverse effects.

== Bibliography ==
- Hluchan, Stephen E.; Pomerantz, Kenneth (2005). "Calcium and Calcium Alloys". Ullmann's Encyclopedia of Industrial Chemistry. Weinheim: Wiley-VCH. doi:10.1002/14356007.a04_515.pub2. ISBN 978-3-527-30673-2.
