= V41 =

V41 may refer to:

- Dodge V41, a telephone maintenance vehicle
- ITU-T V.41, an error control system
- Nissan Quest (V41), a minivan
- Vanadium-41, an isotope of vanadium
