= Scandium-44 =

Isotope of scandium

General
- Symbol: ^{44}Sc
- Names: scandium-44
- Protons (Z): 21
- Neutrons (N): 23

Nuclide data
- Natural abundance: Trace
- Half-life (t_{1/2}): 4.042 h
- Isotope mass: 43.959403 Da
- Spin: 2+
- Parent isotopes: ^{44}Ti (EC)
- Decay products: ^{44}Ca

Decay modes
- Decay mode: Decay energy (MeV)
- β^{+}: 3.653

Scandium-44 (^{44}Sc) is a radioactive isotope of scandium that decays by positron emission to stable ^{44}Ca with a half-life of 4.042 hours.

^{44}Sc can be obtained as a daughter radionuclide of long-lived ^{44}Ti (t_{1/2} 59.1 a) from a ^{44}Ti/^{44}Sc generator or produced by the nuclear reaction ^{44}Ca(p,n)^{44}Sc in small cyclotrons. This isotope is of potential interest for clinical PET imaging.

== Applications ==
=== Titanium-44 generation ===
^{44}Ti with its long half-life provides a cyclotron-independent source of ^{44}Sc for decades. It is obtained by the nuclear reaction ^{45}Sc(p,2n)^{44}Ti and transforms, through electron capture, into excited states of ^{44}Sc and emits gamma rays at 67.9 keV and 78.3 keV.

The ^{44}Ti/^{44}Sc generator represents a secular equilibrium system with a half-life ratio between parent and daughter of about 128,000, which can be treated as virtually infinite. Consequently, half the saturation activity is generated every four hours (^{44}Sc half-life), and identical ^{44}Sc batch activities very close to saturation may be eluted each day. One can attain >97% elution efficacy for ^{44}Sc and very low breakthrough of <5*10^{−5} % of ^{44}Ti.

^{44}Ti is adsorbed onto a column filled with anion-exchange resin. ^{44}Sc is eluted with 20 mL of 0.005M H_{2}C_{2}O_{4}/0.07M HCl solution. The eluate is directly post-processed on miniaturized column filled with cation-exchange resin where ^{44}Sc is quantitatively adsorbed online and successively eluted using 2–3 mL of 0.25 M ammonium acetate buffer (pH 4.0). This ^{44}Sc solution of small volume and free of competing oxalates can be used for further labelling studies.

=== Scandium-44 as a PET tracer ===
^{44}Sc complexates with DOTA, a well-established bifunctional chelators conjugated to peptides or other molecular targeting vectors, its half-life of 4 h, a high positron branching, stable and non-toxic decay product and being generator-produced makes it an appropriate candidate in PET–CT diagnosis. ^{44}Sc has an almost 4-times longer half-life and higher β^{+} branching than commonly used ^{68}Ga, therefore it can be used for more accurate planning and dosimetric calculations being able to cover imaging periods of more than one day. A specific field might be application of diagnostic ^{44}Sc tracers for matching therapeutic analog compounds labelled with another radioisotope such as ^{90}Y, ^{177}Lu or with the β^{−} emitter ^{47}Sc.

Recent studies with ^{44}Sc-DOTA-conjugated tumor targeting vectors such as octreotides, showed in vitro and in vivo stability and revealed pharmacological parameters adequate to long-term (up to one day) molecular imaging. Initial human studies with ^{44}Sc-DOTATOC PET/CT imaging of somatostatin receptor positive liver metastases in a patient at early time-points (40 min p.i.) showed comparable results to ^{68}Ga-DOTATATE (90 min. p.i.) in the same patient.

== See also ==
- Isotopes of scandium
