= V66 =

V66 may refer to

- Vanadium-66, an isotope of vanadium
- Vought V-66, an American observation biplane
- WVJV-TV, a former music television station in Boston, Massachusetts
