= Calcium-48 =

Isotope of calcium

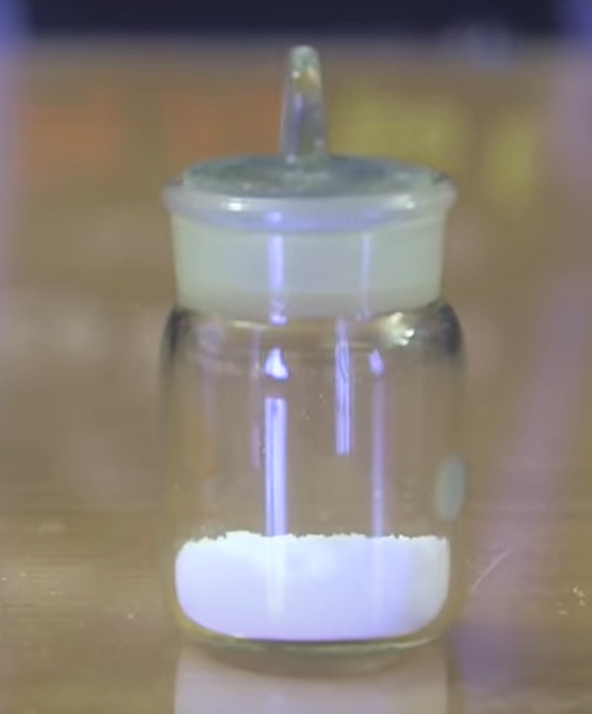
- A glass container with 2 g of ^{48}CaCO_{3}

General
- Symbol: ^{48}Ca
- Names: calcium-48
- Protons (Z): 20
- Neutrons (N): 28

Nuclide data
- Natural abundance: 0.187%
- Half-life (t_{1/2}): 5.6×10^{19} a
- Isotope mass: 47.952523 Da

Calcium-48 is a scarce isotope of calcium containing 20 protons and 28 neutrons. It makes up 0.187% of natural calcium by mole fraction. Although it is unusually neutron-rich for such a light nucleus, its beta decay is extremely hindered, and so the only radioactive decay pathway that it has been observed to undergo is the extremely rare double beta decay (2β), becoming titanium-48. Its half-life is about 5.6×10^{19} years (which is within the normal range for double beta) so for all practical purposes it can be treated as stable. One cause of this unusual stability is that 20 and 28 are both magic numbers, making ^{48}Ca a "doubly magic" nucleus.

Since ^{48}Ca is both practically stable and neutron-rich, it is a valuable starting material for the production of new nuclei in particle accelerators, both by fragmentation and by fusion reactions with other nuclei, for example in the discoveries of the five heaviest known elements, from flerovium to oganesson (atomic numbers 114 through 118). Heavier nuclei generally require a greater fraction of neutrons for maximum stability, so neutron-rich starting materials are necessary.

^{48}Ca is the lightest nucleus known to undergo 2β and the only one simple enough to be analyzed with the sd nuclear shell model. It also releases more energy (4.27 MeV) than any other 2β candidate. These properties make it a probe of nuclear structure models and a promising candidate in the ongoing search for neutrinoless double beta decay.

== See also ==
- Isotopes of calcium
- Nickel-48
