= Isotopes of scandium =

Isotopes of scandium (_{21}Sc)
Main isotopes			Decay	
Isotope	abundance	half-life (t_{1/2})	mode	product
^{43}Sc	synth	3.891 h	β^{+}	^{43}Ca
^{44}Sc	synth	4.042 h	β^{+}	^{44}Ca
^{44m3}Sc	synth	58.61 h	IT	^{44}Sc
^{44m3}Sc	synth	58.61 h	β^{+}	^{44}Ca
^{45}Sc	100%	stable		
^{46}Sc	synth	83.757 d	β^{−}	^{46}Ti
^{47}Sc	synth	3.3492 d	β^{−}	^{47}Ti
^{48}Sc	synth	43.67 h	β^{−}	^{48}Ti

Standard atomic weight A_{r}°(Sc)
- 44.955907±0.000004; 44.956±0.001 (abridged)

Naturally-occurring scandium (_{21}Sc) is composed of one stable isotope, ^{45}Sc. Twenty-six radioisotopes have been characterized from ^{37}Sc to ^{63}Sc, with the most stable being ^{46}Sc with a half-life of 83.76 days, ^{47}Sc with a half-life of 3.3492 days, ^{48}Sc at 43.67 hours, ^{44}Sc at 4.042 hours, and ^{43}Sc at 3.891 hours. All other radioisotopes isotopes have half-lives shorter than an hour, and the majority of these shorter than 15 seconds. This element also has 13 meta states with the most stable being ^{44m3}Sc (t_{1/2} = 58.6 h); this is the lightest isotope with a long-lived isomer.

The primary decay mode at masses lower than the only stable isotope, ^{45}Sc, is beta-plus or electron capture, and the primary mode at masses above it is beta-minus. The primary decay products at atomic weights below ^{45}Sc are calcium isotopes and the primary products from higher atomic weights are titanium isotopes.

Scandium-44 has potential medical use for PET imaging.

== List of isotopes ==
Nuclide (Note: ^{m}Sc – Excited nuclear isomer.)	Z	N	Isotopic mass (Da) (Note: ( ) – Uncertainty (1σ) is given in concise form in parentheses after the corresponding last digits.) (Note: # – Atomic mass marked #: value and uncertainty derived not from purely experimental data, but at least partly from trends from the Mass Surface (TMS).)	Discovery year	Half-life (Note: # – Values marked # are not purely derived from experimental data, but at least partly from trends of neighboring nuclides (TNN).)	Decay mode (Note: Modes of decay: IT: / Isomeric transition; n: / Neutron emission; p: / Proton emission)	Daughter isotope (Note: Bold symbol as daughter – Daughter product is stable.)	Spin and parity (Note: ( ) spin value – Indicates spin with weak assignment arguments.)	Isotopic abundance
Nuclide	Excitation energy			Discovery year	Half-life	Decay mode	Daughter isotope	Spin and parity	Isotopic abundance
^{37}Sc	21	16	37.00376(44)	2024		p	^{36}Ca		
^{38}Sc	21	17	37.995002(15)	2024		p	^{37}Ca		
^{39}Sc	21	18	38.984785(26)	1988		p	^{38}Ca	7/2−#	
^{40}Sc	21	19	39.9779673(30)	1955	182.3(7) ms	β^{+} (99.54%)	^{40}Ca	4−	
^{40}Sc	21	19	39.9779673(30)	1955	182.3(7) ms	β^{+}, p (0.44%)	^{39}K	4−	
^{40}Sc	21	19	39.9779673(30)	1955	182.3(7) ms	β^{+}, α (0.017%)	^{36}Ar	4−	
^{41}Sc	21	20	40.969251163(83)	1941	596.3(17) ms	β^{+}	^{41}Ca	7/2−	
^{42}Sc	21	21	41.96551669(17)	1955	680.72(26) ms	β^{+}	^{42}Ca	0+	
^{42m}Sc	616.81(6) keV			1963	61.7(4) s	β^{+}	^{42}Ca	7+	
^{43}Sc	21	22	42.9611504(20)	1935	3.891(12) h	β^{+}	^{43}Ca	7/2−	
^{43m1}Sc	151.79(8) keV			1964	438(5) μs	IT	^{43}Sc	3/2+	
^{43m2}Sc	3123.73(15) keV			1971	472(3) ns	IT	^{43}Sc	19/2−	
^{44}Sc	21	23	43.9594028(19)	1937	4.0421(25) h	β^{+}	^{44}Ca	2+	
^{44m1}Sc	67.8679(14) keV			1959	154.8(8) ns	IT	^{44}Sc	1−	
^{44m2}Sc	146.1914(20) keV			1964	51.0(3) μs	IT	^{44}Sc	0−	
^{44m3}Sc	271.240(10) keV			1938	58.61(10) h	IT (98.80%)	^{44}Sc	6+	
^{44m3}Sc	271.240(10) keV			1938	58.61(10) h	β^{+} (1.20%)	^{44}Ca	6+	
^{45}Sc	21	24	44.95590705(71)	1923	Stable			7/2−	1.0000
^{45m}Sc	12.40(5) keV			1964	318(7) ms	IT	^{45}Sc	3/2+	
^{46}Sc	21	25	45.95516703(72)	1936	83.757(14) d	β^{−}	^{46}Ti	4+	
^{46m1}Sc	52.011(1) keV			1968	9.4(8) μs	IT	^{46}Sc	6+	
^{46m2}Sc	142.528(7) keV			1948	18.75(4) s	IT	^{46}Sc	1−	
^{47}Sc	21	26	46.9524024(21)	1945	3.3492(6) d	β^{−}	^{47}Ti	7/2−	
^{47m}Sc	766.83(9) keV			1964	272(8) ns	IT	^{47}Sc	(3/2)+	
^{48}Sc	21	27	47.9522229(53)	1937	43.67(9) h	β^{−}	^{48}Ti	6+	
^{49}Sc	21	28	48.9500132(24)	1940	57.18(13) min	β^{−}	^{49}Ti	7/2−	
^{50}Sc	21	29	49.9521874(27)	1959	102.5(5) s	β^{−}	^{50}Ti	5+	
^{50m}Sc	256.895(10) keV			1963	350(40) ms	IT (>99%)	^{50}Sc	2+	
^{50m}Sc	256.895(10) keV			1963	350(40) ms	β^{−} (<1%)	^{50}Ti	2+	
^{51}Sc	21	30	50.9535688(27)	1966	12.4(1) s	β^{−}	^{51}Ti	(7/2)−	
^{52}Sc	21	31	51.9564962(33)	1980	8.2(2) s	β^{−}	^{52}Ti	3(+)	
^{53}Sc	21	32	52.958379(19)	1980	2.4(6) s	β^{−}	^{53}Ti	(7/2−)	
^{54}Sc	21	33	53.963029(15)	1990	526(15) ms	β^{−} (84%)	^{54}Ti	(3)+	
^{54}Sc	21	33	53.963029(15)	1990	526(15) ms	β^{−}, n (16%)	^{53}Ti	(3)+	
^{54m}Sc	110.5(3) keV			1998	2.77(2) μs	IT	^{54}Sc	(5+,4+)	
^{55}Sc	21	34	54.966890(67)	1990	96(2) ms	β^{−} (83%)	^{55}Ti	(7/2)−	
^{55}Sc	21	34	54.966890(67)	1990	96(2) ms	β^{−}, n (17%)	^{54}Ti	(7/2)−	
^{56}Sc	21	35	55.97261(28)	1997	26(6) ms	β^{−}	^{56}Ti	(1+)	
^{56m1}Sc (Note: Order of ground state and isomer is uncertain.)	0(100)# keV			2004	75(6) ms	β^{−} (<88%)	^{56}Ti	(6+,5+)	
^{56m1}Sc	0(100)# keV			2004	75(6) ms	β^{−}, n (>12%)	^{55}Ti	(6+,5+)	
^{56m2}Sc	775.0(1) keV			2010	290(17) ns	IT	^{56}Sc	(4+)	
^{57}Sc	21	36	56.97705(19)	1997	22(2) ms	β^{−}	^{57}Ti	7/2−#	
^{58}Sc	21	37	57.98338(20)	1997	12(5) ms	β^{−}	^{58}Ti	3+#	
^{58m1}Sc	412.5(3) keV			2021	1185(243) ns	IT	^{58}Sc		
^{58m2}Sc	1420.7(22) keV			2020	0.60(13) μs	IT	^{58}Sc		
^{59}Sc	21	38	58.98837(27)	2009	12# ms [>620 ns]			7/2−#	
^{60}Sc	21	39	59.99512(54)#	2009	10# ms [>620 ns]			3+#	
^{61}Sc	21	40	61.00054(64)#	2009	7# ms [>620 ns]			7/2-#	
^{62}Sc	21	41	62.00785(64)#	2018	2# ms [>400 ns]				
^{63}Sc	21	42	63.01403(75)#	2025	1# ms			7/2−#	
This table header & footer:

== See also ==
Daughter products other than scandium

- Isotopes of titanium
- Isotopes of calcium
- Isotopes of potassium
- Isotopes of argon
