= Isotopes of vanadium =

Isotopes of vanadium (_{23}V)
Main isotopes			Decay	
Isotope	abundance	half-life (t_{1/2})	mode	product
^{48}V	synth	15.97 d	β^{+}	^{48}Ti
^{49}V	synth	330 d	ε	^{49}Ti
^{50}V	0.25%	2.71×10^{17} y	β^{+}	^{50}Ti
^{51}V	99.8%	stable		

Standard atomic weight A_{r}°(V)
- 50.9415±0.0001; 50.942±0.001 (abridged)

Naturally occurring vanadium (_{23}V) is composed of one stable isotope, ^{51}V, and one radioactive isotope, ^{50}V, with a half-life of 2.71×10^{17} years. Twenty-five artificial radioisotopes have been characterized, ranging from ^{43}V to ^{68}V. The most stable of these are ^{49}V with a half-life of 330 days and ^{48}V with a half-life of 15.9735 days. All of the remaining radioactive isotopes have half-lives shorter than an hour, with the majority of them below 10 seconds. Seven metastable excited states have also been observed, two of which are for ^{60}V.

The primary decay mode before the most abundant stable isotope ^{51}V is electron capture or positron emission resulting in titanium isotopes; that after the beta decay to chromium isotopes.

== List of isotopes ==
Nuclide (Note: ^{m}V – Excited nuclear isomer.)	Z	N	Isotopic mass (Da) (Note: ( ) – Uncertainty (1σ) is given in concise form in parentheses after the corresponding last digits.) (Note: # – Atomic mass marked #: value and uncertainty derived not from purely experimental data, but at least partly from trends from the Mass Surface (TMS).)	Discovery year	Half-life (Note: Bold half-life – nearly stable, half-life longer than age of universe.) (Note: # – Values marked # are not purely derived from experimental data, but at least partly from trends of neighboring nuclides (TNN).)	Decay mode (Note: Modes of decay: EC: / Electron capture; IT: / Isomeric transition; p: / Proton emission)	Daughter isotope (Note: Bold symbol as daughter – Daughter product is stable.)	Spin and parity (Note: ( ) spin value – Indicates spin with weak assignment arguments.)	Natural abundance (mole fraction)	
Nuclide	Excitation energy			Discovery year	Half-life	Decay mode	Daughter isotope	Spin and parity	Normal proportion	Range of variation
^{43}V	23	20	42.980766(46)	1987	79.3(24) ms	β^{+} (>97.5%)	^{43}Ti	7/2−#		
^{43}V	23	20	42.980766(46)	1987	79.3(24) ms	β^{+}, p (<2.5%)	^{42}Sc	7/2−#		
^{44}V	23	21	43.9744410(78)	1971	111(7) ms	β^{+}	^{44}Ti	(2)+		
^{44}V	23	21	43.9744410(78)	1971	111(7) ms	β^{+}, α (?%)	^{40}Ca	(2)+		
^{44m}V	271(9) keV			1994	150(3) ms	β^{+}	^{44}Ti	(6)+		
^{45}V	23	22	44.96576850(93)	1974	547(6) ms	β^{+}	^{45}Ti	7/2−		
^{45m}V	56.8(6) keV			1980	512(13) ns	IT	^{45}V	(3/2−)		
^{46}V	23	23	45.96019739(14)	1952	422.62(5) ms	β^{+}	^{46}Ti	0+		
^{46m}V	801.46(10) keV			1962	1.02(7) ms	IT	^{46}V	3+		
^{47}V	23	24	46.95490356(12)	1942	32.6(3) min	β^{+}	^{47}Ti	3/2−		
^{48}V	23	25	47.9522509(10)	1937	15.9735(25) d	β^{+}	^{48}Ti	4+		
^{49}V	23	26	48.94851051(88)	1940	330(15) d	EC	^{49}Ti	7/2−		
^{50}V (Note: Primordial radionuclide)	23	27	49.947156681(99)	1949	2.71(13)×10^{17} y	β^{+} (Note: Theoretically capable of β^{−} decay to ^{50}Cr; the most recent measurement suggests a branching ratio of 0.7%.)	^{50}Ti	6+	0.00250(10)	
^{51}V (Note: See also Vanadium-51 nuclear magnetic resonance)	23	28	50.94395766(10)	1923	Stable			7/2−	0.99750(10)	
^{52}V	23	29	51.94477364(17)	1934	3.743(5) min	β^{−}	^{52}Cr	3+		
^{53}V	23	30	52.9443349(33)	1960	1.543(14) min	β^{−}	^{53}Cr	7/2−		
^{54}V	23	31	53.946432(12)	1970	49.8(5) s	β^{−}	^{54}Cr	3+		
^{54m}V	108.0(10) keV			1998	900(500) ns	IT	^{54}V	(5)+		
^{55}V	23	32	54.947262(29)	1977	6.54(15) s	β^{−}	^{55}Cr	7/2−#		
^{56}V	23	33	55.95042(19)	1980	216(4) ms	β^{−}	^{56}Cr	(1+)		
^{57}V	23	34	56.952297(91)	1980	350(10) ms	β^{−}	^{57}Cr	(7/2−)		
^{58}V	23	35	57.95660(10)	1980	191(10) ms	β^{−}	^{58}Cr	(1+)		
^{59}V	23	36	58.95962(15)	1985	95(6) ms	β^{−} (<97%)	^{59}Cr	(5/2−)		
^{59}V	23	36	58.95962(15)	1985	95(6) ms	β^{−}, n (>3%)	^{58}Cr	(5/2−)		
^{60}V	23	37	59.96448(20)	1985	122(18) ms	β^{−} (>99.9%)	^{60}Cr	3+#		
^{60m1}V (Note: Order of ground state and isomer is uncertain.)	0(150)# keV			2003	40(15) ms	β^{−}	^{60}Cr	1+#		
^{60m2}V	203.7(7) keV			2010	230(24) ns	IT	^{60}V	(4+)		
^{61}V	23	38	60.96760(25)	1992	48.2(6) ms	β^{−} (85.5%)	^{61}Cr	(3/2−)		
^{61}V	23	38	60.96760(25)	1992	48.2(6) ms	β^{−}, n (14.5%)	^{60}Cr	(3/2−)		
^{62}V	23	39	61.97293(28)	1997	33.6(23) ms	β^{−}	^{62}Cr	3+#		
^{63}V	23	40	62.97666(37)	1997	19.6(9) ms	β^{−} (<65%)	^{63}Cr	(3/2−,5/2−)		
^{63}V	23	40	62.97666(37)	1997	19.6(9) ms	β^{−}, n (>35%)	^{62}Cr	(3/2−,5/2−)		
^{64}V	23	41	63.98248(43)#	1997	15(2) ms	β^{−}	^{64}Cr	(1,2)		
^{64m}V	81.0(7) keV			2014	<1 μs	IT	^{64}V			
^{65}V	23	42	64.98700(54)#	2009	14# ms [>620 ns]			5/2−#		
^{66}V	23	43	65.99324(54)#	2009	10# ms [>620 ns]					
^{67}V	23	44	66.99813(64)#	2013	8# ms [>620 ns]			5/2−#		
^{68}V	23	45		2025						
This table header & footer:

== See also ==
Daughter products other than vanadium

- Isotopes of chromium
- Isotopes of titanium
- Isotopes of scandium
- Isotopes of calcium
