= Isotopes of titanium =

Isotopes of titanium (_{22}Ti)
Main isotopes			Decay	
Isotope	abundance	half-life (t_{1/2})	mode	product
^{44}Ti	synth	59.1 y	ε	^{44}Sc
^{45}Ti	synth	3.08 h	β^{+}	^{45}Sc
^{46}Ti	8.25%	stable		
^{47}Ti	7.44%	stable		
^{48}Ti	73.7%	stable		
^{49}Ti	5.41%	stable		
^{50}Ti	5.18%	stable		

Standard atomic weight A_{r}°(Ti)
- 47.867±0.001; 47.867±0.001 (abridged)

Naturally occurring titanium (_{22}Ti) is composed of five stable isotopes; ^{46}Ti, ^{47}Ti, ^{48}Ti, ^{49}Ti and ^{50}Ti with ^{48}Ti being the most abundant (73.8% natural abundance). Twenty-three radioisotopes have been characterized, with the most stable being ^{44}Ti with a half-life of 59.1 years and ^{45}Ti with a half-life of 184.8 minutes. All of the remaining radioactive isotopes have half-lives that are less than 10 minutes, and the majority of these have half-lives that are less than one second.

The isotopes of titanium range from ^{39}Ti to ^{66}Ti. The primary decay mode for isotopes lighter than the stable isotopes is β^{+} and the primary mode for the heavier ones is β^{−}; the decay products are respectively scandium isotopes and vanadium isotopes.

There are two stable isotopes of titanium with an odd number of nucleons, ^{47}Ti and ^{49}Ti, which thus have non-zero nuclear spin of 5/2− and 7/2− (respectively) and are NMR-active.

== List of isotopes ==
Nuclide (Note: ^{m}Ti – Excited nuclear isomer.)	Z	N	Isotopic mass (Da) (Note: ( ) – Uncertainty (1σ) is given in concise form in parentheses after the corresponding last digits.) (Note: # – Atomic mass marked #: value and uncertainty derived not from purely experimental data, but at least partly from trends from the Mass Surface (TMS).)	Discovery year	Half-life (Note: # – Values marked # are not purely derived from experimental data, but at least partly from trends of neighboring nuclides (TNN).)	Decay mode (Note: Modes of decay: EC: / Electron capture; n: / Neutron emission; p: / Proton emission)	Daughter isotope (Note: Bold symbol as daughter – Daughter product is stable.)	Spin and parity (Note: ( ) spin value – Indicates spin with weak assignment arguments.)	Natural abundance (mole fraction)	
Nuclide	Excitation energy			Discovery year	Half-life	Decay mode	Daughter isotope	Spin and parity	Normal proportion	Range of variation
^{39}Ti	22	17	39.00268(22)#	1990	28.5(9) ms	β^{+}, p (93.7%)	^{38}Ca	3/2+#		
^{39}Ti	22	17	39.00268(22)#	1990	28.5(9) ms	β^{+} (~6.3%)	^{39}Sc	3/2+#		
^{39}Ti	22	17	39.00268(22)#	1990	28.5(9) ms	β^{+}, 2p (?%)	^{37}K	3/2+#		
^{40}Ti	22	18	39.990345(73)	1982	52.4(3) ms	β^{+}, p (95.8%)	^{39}Ca	0+		
^{40}Ti	22	18	39.990345(73)	1982	52.4(3) ms	β^{+} (4.2%)	^{40}Sc	0+		
^{41}Ti	22	19	40.983148(30)	1964	81.9(5) ms	β^{+}, p (91.1%)	^{40}Ca	3/2+		
^{41}Ti	22	19	40.983148(30)	1964	81.9(5) ms	β^{+} (8.9%)	^{41}Sc	3/2+		
^{42}Ti	22	20	41.97304937(29)	1964	208.3(4) ms	β^{+}	^{42}Sc	0+		
^{43}Ti	22	21	42.9685284(61)	1948	509(5) ms	β^{+}	^{43}Sc	7/2−		
^{43m1}Ti	313.0(10) keV			1978	11.9(3) μs	IT	^{43}Ti	(3/2+)		
^{43m2}Ti	3066.4(10) keV			1978	556(6) ns	IT	^{43}Ti	(19/2−)		
^{44}Ti	22	22	43.95968994(75)	1954	59.1(3) y	EC	^{44}Sc	0+		
^{45}Ti	22	23	44.95812076(90)	1941	184.8(5) min	β^{+}	^{45}Sc	7/2−		
^{45m}Ti	36.53(15) keV			1970	3.0(2) μs	IT	^{45}Ti	3/2−		
^{46}Ti	22	24	45.952626356(97)	1934	Stable			0+	0.0825(3)	
^{47}Ti	22	25	46.951757491(85)	1934	Stable			5/2−	0.0744(2)	
^{48}Ti	22	26	47.947940677(79)	1923	Stable			0+	0.7372(3)	
^{49}Ti	22	27	48.947864391(84)	1934	Stable			7/2−	0.0541(2)	
^{50}Ti	22	28	49.944785622(88)	1934	Stable			0+	0.0518(2)	
^{51}Ti	22	29	50.94660947(52)	1947	5.76(1) min	β^{−}	^{51}V	3/2−		
^{52}Ti	22	30	51.9468835(29)	1966	1.7(1) min	β^{−}	^{52}V	0+		
^{53}Ti	22	31	52.9496707(31)	1977	32.7(9) s	β^{−}	^{53}V	(3/2)−		
^{54}Ti	22	32	53.950892(17)	1980	2.1(10) s	β^{−}	^{54}V	0+		
^{55}Ti	22	33	54.955091(31)	1980	1.3(1) s	β^{−}	^{55}V	(1/2)−		
^{56}Ti	22	34	55.95768(11)	1980	200(5) ms	β^{−}	^{56}V	0+		
^{57}Ti	22	35	56.96307(22)	1985	95(8) ms	β^{−}	^{57}V	5/2−#		
^{58}Ti	22	36	57.96681(20)	1992	55(6) ms	β^{−}	^{58}V	0+		
^{59}Ti	22	37	58.97222(32)#	1997	28.5(19) ms	β^{−}	^{59}V	5/2−#		
^{59m}Ti	108.5(5) keV			2005	615(11) ns	IT	^{59}Ti	1/2−#		
^{60}Ti	22	38	59.97628(26)	1997	22.2(16) ms	β^{−}	^{60}V	0+		
^{61}Ti	22	39	60.98243(32)#	1997	15(4) ms	β^{−}	^{61}V	1/2−#		
^{61m1}Ti	125.0(5) keV			2019	200(28) ns	IT	^{61}Ti	5/2−#		
^{61m2}Ti	700.1(7) keV			2019	354(69) ns	IT	^{61}Ti	9/2+#		
^{62}Ti	22	40	61.98690(43)#	2009	9# ms[>620 ns]			0+		
^{63}Ti	22	41	62.99371(54)#	2009	10# ms[>620 ns]			1/2−#		
^{64}Ti	22	42	63.99841(64)#	2013	5# ms[>620 ns]			0+		
^{65}Ti	22	43	65.00559(75)#	2025	1# ms			1/2−#		
^{66}Ti	22	44		2025				0+		
This table header & footer:

== Titanium-44 ==
Titanium-44 (^{44}Ti) is a radioactive isotope of titanium that undergoes electron capture with a half-life of 59.1 years to an excited state of scandium-44, before reaching the ground state of ^{44}Sc and ultimately of ^{44}Ca. Because titanium-44 can decay only through electron capture, its half-life increases slowly with its ionization state and it becomes stable in its fully ionized state (that is, having a charge of +22), though as astrophysical environments never lack electrons completely, it will always decay.

Titanium-44 is produced in relative abundance in the alpha process in stellar nucleosynthesis and the early stages of supernova explosions. It is produced when stable calcium-40 adds an alpha particle (helium-4), as nickel-56 is the result of adding three more. The age of supernova remnants (even though nickel-56 has died away to iron) may be determined through measurements of gamma-ray emissions from the relatively long-lived titanium-44 and of its abundance. It was observed in the Cassiopeia A supernova remnant and SN 1987A at a relatively high concentration, enhanced by the delayed decay in the ionizing conditions.

== See also ==
Daughter products other than titanium

- Isotopes of vanadium
- Isotopes of scandium
- Isotopes of calcium
- Isotopes of potassium
