= Potassium-40 =

Radioactive isotope of potassium

General
- Symbol: ^{40}K
- Names: potassium-40
- Protons (Z): 19
- Neutrons (N): 21

Nuclide data
- Natural abundance: 0.0117%
- Half-life (t_{1/2}): 1.248×10^{9} y
- Isotope mass: 39.963998 Da
- Spin: 4^{−}
- Excess energy: −33505 keV
- Nuclear binding energy: 341523 keV
- Parent isotopes: Primordial
- Decay products: ^{40}Ca (β^{−})^{40}Ar (EC, γ; β^{+})

Decay modes
- Decay mode: Decay energy (MeV)
- β^{−}: 1.3109
- EC: 1.5044

Potassium-40 (^{40}K) is a long lived and the main naturally occurring radioactive isotope of potassium, with a half-life of 1.248 billion years. It makes up about 117 ppm of natural potassium, making that mixture very weakly radioactive. The half-life is much shorter than the age of Earth, meaning this fraction was significantly larger earlier in Earth's history.

Potassium-40 undergoes four different paths of radioactive decay, including all three main types of beta decay:

- Electron emission (β^{−}) to ^{40}Ca with a decay energy of 1.31 MeV at 89.6% probability
- Electron capture (EC) to ^{40}Ar^{*} followed by a gamma decay emitting a photon (Note: Also called a gamma ray, because it is produced by a transition in the nucleus) with an energy of 1.46 MeV at 10.3% probability
- Direct electron capture (EC) to the ground state of ^{40}Ar at 0.1% probability
- Positron emission (β^{+}) to ^{40}Ar at 0.001% probability

Both forms of the electron capture decay release further photons, (Note: Also called X-rays, as they are emitted from transitions of electrons) when electrons from the outer shells fall into the inner shells to replace the electron taken from there. The total energy for the decay to argon is 1.51 MeV.

The EC decay of ^{40}K explains the large abundance of argon (nearly 1%) in the Earth's atmosphere, as well as prevalence of ^{40}Ar over other isotopes.

== Potassium–argon dating ==
Decay scheme

Potassium-40 is especially important in potassium–argon (K–Ar) dating. Argon is a gas that does not ordinarily combine with other elements. So, when a mineral forms – whether from molten rock, or from substances dissolved in water – it will be initially argon-free, even if there is some argon in the liquid. However, if the mineral contains traces of potassium, then decay of the ^{40}K isotope present will create fresh argon-40 that will remain locked up in the mineral. Since the rate at which this conversion occurs is known, it is possible to determine the elapsed time since the mineral formed by measuring the ratio of ^{40}K and ^{40}Ar atoms contained in it.

The argon in Earth's atmosphere is 99.6% ^{40}Ar, but the argon in the Sun – and presumably in the primordial material that condensed into the planets – is mostly ^{36}Ar, with less than 15% of ^{38}Ar. It follows that most of Earth's argon derives from potassium-40 that decayed into argon-40, which eventually escaped to the atmosphere.

== Contribution to natural radioactivity ==
The evolution of Earth's mantle radiogenic heat flow over time: contribution from ^{40}K in yellow.

The decay of ^{40}K in Earth's mantle ranks third, after ^{232}Th and ^{238}U, in the list of sources of radiogenic heat. Less is known about the amount of radiogenic sources in Earth's outer and inner core, which lie below the mantle. It has been proposed, though, that significant core radioactivity (1–2 TW) may be caused by high levels of U, Th and K.

Potassium-40 is the largest source of natural radioactivity in animals including humans. A 70 kg human body contains about 140 g (or 126 g) of potassium, hence about 140g × 0.0117% * (39.96/39.10) ≈ 16.7 mg of ^{40}K; whose decay produces about 3,850 to 4,300 disintegrations per second (becquerel) continuously throughout the life of an adult person (and proportionally less in children). (Note: The number of radioactive decays per second in a given mass of ^{40}K is the number of atoms in that mass, divided by the average lifetime of a ^{40}K atom in seconds. The number of atoms in one gram of ^{40}K is the Avogadro constant 6.022×10^{23} mol^{−1} divided by the atomic weight of potassium-40 (39.96 g/mol): about 1.507×10^{22} per gram. As in any exponential decay, the average lifetime is the half-life divided by the natural logarithm of 2, or about 56.82×10^{15} seconds.) The normal potassium-40 concentration in the human body is equivalent to 55 Bq per kilogram, corresponding to an effective dose of 0.2 millisievert per year throughout the body. This is the largest source of internal radiation, followed by 0.12 mSv per year from the nuclides in the uranium and thorium decay series, and just 12 microsieverts per year from carbon-14.

== Banana equivalent dose ==
Potassium-40 is famous for its usage in the banana equivalent dose, an informal unit of measure, primarily used in general educational settings, to compare radioactive dosages to the amount received by eating one banana. If a banana weighing 120 grams has a concentration of 350 mg potassium per 100 grams, then it contains 420 mg. If the human body contains about 126 grams of potassium and this potassium gives an effective dose of 200 μSv per year (see above), then the potassium in a banana would theoretically add (0.420/126)200 ≈ 0.67 μSv per year, under the assumptions that all of the radiation produced by potassium-40 is absorbed in the body (mostly true, as most of the radiation is beta-minus radiation, which has a short range). If the biological half-life of potassium is taken as 38 days (this of course depends on how much potassium is ingested per day) then the effective dose integrated over time is (0.67)(38/365)/ln(2)⇔0.1 μSv, and this value is taken as the "banana equivalent dose'. At the estimated 0.1 μSv, one banana equivalent dose is around 1% of the average American's daily exposure to radiation. In actual fact, eating a banana will not add 0.1 μSv of dose, because the potassium concentration in the body is controlled, so it will not remain elevated for weeks.

== See also ==
- Background radiation
- Isotopes of potassium

== Notes ==
Lighter: potassium-39	Potassium-40 is an isotope of potassium	Heavier: potassium-41
Decay product of: —	Decay chain of potassium-40	Decays to: argon-40, calcium-40, Stable
