= Isotopes of calcium =

Isotopes of calcium (_{20}Ca)
| Main isotopes | | | Decay | |
| Isotope | abundance | half-life (t_{1/2}) | mode | product |
|---|---|---|---|---|
| ^{40}Ca | 96.9% | stable | | |
| ^{41}Ca | trace | 9.94×10^{4} y | ε | ^{41}K |
| ^{42}Ca | 0.647% | stable | | |
| ^{43}Ca | 0.135% | stable | | |
| ^{44}Ca | 2.09% | stable | | |
| ^{45}Ca | synth | 162.61 d | β^{−} | ^{45}Sc |
| ^{46}Ca | 0.004% | stable | | |
| ^{47}Ca | synth | 4.536 d | β^{−} | ^{47}Sc |
| ^{48}Ca | 0.187% | 5.6×10^{19} y | β^{−}β^{−} | ^{48}Ti |

Standard atomic weight A_{r}°(Ca)
- 40.078±0.004; 40.078±0.004 (abridged)

Calcium (_{20}Ca) has 26 known isotopes, ranging from ^{35}Ca to ^{60}Ca. There are five stable isotopes (^{40}Ca, ^{42}Ca, ^{43}Ca, ^{44}Ca and ^{46}Ca), plus one isotope (^{48}Ca) with such a long half-life that it is for all practical purposes stable. Two isotopes of calcium, ^{40}Ca and ^{48}Ca, are doubly-magic, making them particularly stable nucliides. Calcium also has a cosmogenic isotope, ^{41}Ca, with half-life 99,400 years. Unlike cosmogenic isotopes produced in the air, ^{41}Ca is produced by neutron activation of solid ^{40}Ca in rock and soil. Most of its production is in the upper meter of the soil column, where the cosmogenic neutron flux is still strong enough. Calcium-41 is also produced during stellar nucleosynthesis and decays to ^{41}K, which can be used to understand formation and mixing between solar system reservoirs. The most stable artificial isotopes are ^{45}Ca with half-life 162.61 days and ^{47}Ca with half-life 4.536 days. All other artificial calcium isotopes have half-lives of minutes or less.

^{40}Ca comprises about 97% of natural calcium and is mainly created by nucleosynthesis in stars (alpha process). Like ^{40}Ar, however, some ^{40}Ca is radiogenic, created by radioactive decay of ^{40}K. While K–Ar dating has been used extensively in the geological sciences, the prevalence of ^{40}Ca in nature initially impeded the proliferation of K-Ca dating in early studies, with only a handful of studies in the 20th century. Modern techniques using increasingly precise Thermal-Ionization (TIMS) and Collsion-Cell Multi-Collector Inductively-coupled plasma mass spectrometry (CC-MC-ICP-MS) techniques, however, have been used for successful K–Ca dating similar in method to Rb-Sr dating, as well as determining K losses from the lower continental crust and for source-tracing calcium contributions from various geologic reservoirs.

Stable isotope variations of calcium (most typically ^{44}Ca/^{40}Ca or ^{44}Ca/^{42}Ca, denoted 'δ^{44}Ca' and 'δ^{44/42}Ca' in delta notation) are also widely used across the natural sciences for a number of applications, ranging from early determination of osteoporosis to quantifying volcanic eruption timescales. Other applications include: quantifying carbon sequestration efficiency in CO_{2} injection sites and understanding ocean acidification, exploring both ubiquitous and rare magmatic processes, such as formation of granites and carbonatites, tracing modern and ancient trophic webs including in dinosaurs, assessing weaning practices in ancient humans, and a plethora of other emerging applications.

== List of isotopes ==
| Nuclide | Z | N | Isotopic mass (Da) (Note: ( ) – Uncertainty (1σ) is given in concise form in parentheses after the corresponding last digits.) | Discovery year | Half-life (Note: Bold half-life – nearly stable, half-life longer than age of universe.) | Decay mode (Note: Modes of decay: EC: / Electron capture; n: / Neutron emission; p: / Proton emission) | Daughter isotope (Note: Bold symbol as daughter – Daughter product is stable.) | Spin and parity (Note: ( ) spin value – Indicates spin with weak assignment arguments.) (Note: # – Values marked # are not purely derived from experimental data, but at least partly from trends of neighboring nuclides (TNN).) | Natural abundance (mole fraction) | |
| Nuclide | Z | N | Isotopic mass (Da) | Discovery year | Half-life | Decay mode | Daughter isotope | Spin and parity | Normal proportion | Range of variation |
|---|---|---|---|---|---|---|---|---|---|---|
| ^{35}Ca | 20 | 15 | 35.00557(22)# | 1985 | 25.7(2) ms | β^{+}, p (95.8%) | ^{34}Ar | 1/2+# | | |
| ^{35}Ca | 20 | 15 | 35.00557(22)# | 1985 | 25.7(2) ms | β^{+}, 2p (4.2%) | ^{33}Cl | 1/2+# | | |
| ^{35}Ca | 20 | 15 | 35.00557(22)# | 1985 | 25.7(2) ms | β^{+} (rare) | ^{35}K | 1/2+# | | |
| ^{36}Ca | 20 | 16 | 35.993074(43) | 1977 | 100.9(13) ms | β^{+}, p (51.2%) | ^{35}Ar | 0+ | | |
| ^{36}Ca | 20 | 16 | 35.993074(43) | 1977 | 100.9(13) ms | β^{+} (48.8%) | ^{36}K | 0+ | | |
| ^{37}Ca | 20 | 17 | 36.98589785(68) | 1964 | 181.0(9) ms | β^{+}, p (76.8%) | ^{36}Ar | 3/2+ | | |
| ^{37}Ca | 20 | 17 | 36.98589785(68) | 1964 | 181.0(9) ms | β^{+} (23.2%) | ^{37}K | 3/2+ | | |
| ^{38}Ca | 20 | 18 | 37.97631922(21) | 1966 | 443.70(25) ms | β^{+} | ^{38}K | 0+ | | |
| ^{39}Ca | 20 | 19 | 38.97071081(64) | 1943 | 860.3(8) ms | β^{+} | ^{39}K | 3/2+ | | |
| ^{40}Ca (Note: Heaviest observationally stable nuclide with equal numbers of protons and neutrons) | 20 | 20 | 39.962590850(22) | 1922 | Observationally stable (Note: Believed to undergo double electron capture to ^{40}Ar with a half-life no less than 10^{22} y) | | | 0+ | 0.9694(16) | 0.96933–0.96947 |
| ^{41}Ca | 20 | 21 | 40.96227791(15) | 1939 | 9.94(15)×10^{4} y | EC | ^{41}K | 7/2− | Trace (Note: Cosmogenic nuclide) | |
| ^{42}Ca | 20 | 22 | 41.95861778(16) | 1934 | Stable | | | 0+ | 0.00647(23) | 0.00646–0.00648 |
| ^{43}Ca | 20 | 23 | 42.95876638(24) | 1934 | Stable | | | 7/2− | 0.00135(10) | 0.00135–0.00135 |
| ^{44}Ca | 20 | 24 | 43.95548149(35) | 1922 | Stable | | | 0+ | 0.0209(11) | 0.02082–0.02092 |
| ^{45}Ca | 20 | 25 | 44.95618627(39) | 1940 | 162.61(9) d | β^{−} | ^{45}Sc | 7/2− | | |
| ^{46}Ca | 20 | 26 | 45.9536877(24) | 1938 | Observationally stable (Note: Believed to undergo β^{−}β^{−} decay to ^{46}Ti) | | | 0+ | 4×10^{−5} | 4×10^{−5}–4×10^{−5} |
| ^{47}Ca | 20 | 27 | 46.9545411(24) | 1951 | 4.536(3) d | β^{−} | ^{47}Sc | 7/2− | | |
| ^{48}Ca (Note: Primordial radionuclide) (Note: Believed to be capable of undergoing triple beta decay with very long partial half-life) | 20 | 28 | 47.952522654(18) | 1938 | 5.6(10)×10^{19} y | β^{−}β^{−} (Note: Lightest nuclide known to undergo double beta decay) (Note: Theorized to also undergo β^{−} decay to ^{48}Sc with a partial half-life exceeding 1.1^{+0.8}_{−0.6}×10^{21} years) | ^{48}Ti | 0+ | 0.00187(21) | 0.00186–0.00188 |
| ^{49}Ca | 20 | 29 | 48.95566263(19) | 1950 | 8.718(6) min | β^{−} | ^{49}Sc | 3/2− | | |
| ^{50}Ca | 20 | 30 | 49.9574992(17) | 1964 | 13.45(5) s | β^{−} | ^{50}Sc | 0+ | | |
| ^{51}Ca | 20 | 31 | 50.96099566(56) | 1980 | 10.0(8) s | β^{−} | ^{51}Sc | 3/2− | | |
| ^{52}Ca | 20 | 32 | 51.96321365(72) | 1985 | 4.6(3) s | β^{−} (>98%) | ^{52}Sc | 0+ | | |
| ^{52}Ca | 20 | 32 | 51.96321365(72) | 1985 | 4.6(3) s | β^{−}, n (<2%) | ^{51}Sc | 0+ | | |
| ^{53}Ca | 20 | 33 | 52.968451(47) | 1983 | 461(90) ms | β^{−} (60%) | ^{53}Sc | 1/2−# | | |
| ^{53}Ca | 20 | 33 | 52.968451(47) | 1983 | 461(90) ms | β^{−}, n (40%) | ^{52}Sc | 1/2−# | | |
| ^{54}Ca | 20 | 34 | 53.972989(52) | 1997 | 90(6) ms | β^{−} | ^{54}Sc | 0+ | | |
| ^{55}Ca | 20 | 35 | 54.97998(17) | 1997 | 22(2) ms | β^{−} | ^{55}Sc | 5/2−# | | |
| ^{56}Ca | 20 | 36 | 55.98550(27) | 1997 | 11(2) ms | β^{−} | ^{56}Sc | 0+ | | |
| ^{57}Ca | 20 | 37 | 56.99296(43)# | 2009 | 8# ms [>620 ns] | | | 5/2−# | | |
| ^{58}Ca | 20 | 38 | 57.99836(54)# | 2009 | 4# ms [>620 ns] | | | 0+ | | |
| ^{59}Ca | 20 | 39 | 59.00624(64)# | 2018 | 5# ms [>400 ns] | | | 5/2−# | | |
| ^{60}Ca | 20 | 40 | 60.01181(75)# | 2018 | 2# ms [>400 ns] | | | 0+ | | |
| ^{61}Ca | 20 | 41 | 61.02041(86)# | (2025) (Note: Discovery of this isotope is unconfirmed) | 1# ms | | | 1/2−# | | |
This table header & footer:

== Calcium-48 ==
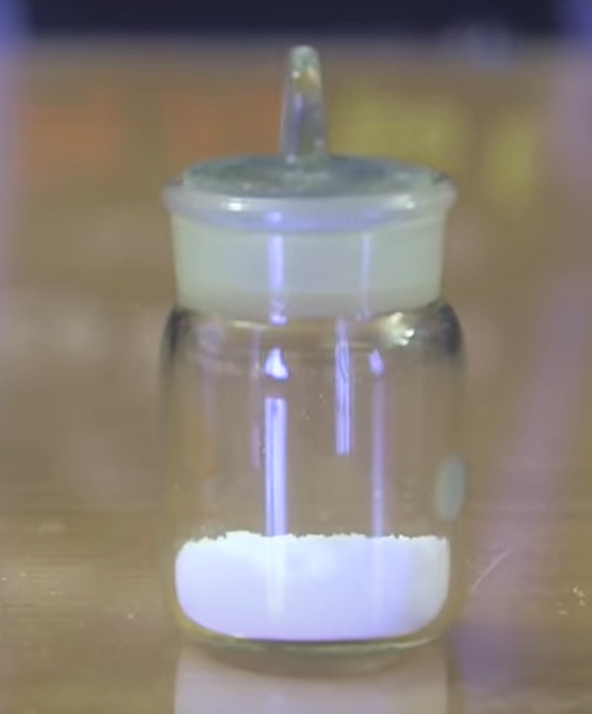
About 2 g of calcium-48

Calcium-48 is a doubly magic nucleus with 28 neutrons; unusually neutron-rich for a light primordial nucleus. It decays via double beta decay with an extremely long half-life of about 5.6×10^{19} years, though single beta decay is also theoretically possible. This decay can analyzed with the sd nuclear shell model, and it is more energetic (4.27 MeV) than any other double beta decay. It is used as a precursor for neutron-rich and superheavy isotopes.

== Calcium-60 ==
Calcium-60 is the heaviest known isotope as of 2020. First observed in 2018 at Riken alongside ^{59}Ca and seven isotopes of other elements, its existence suggests that there are additional even-N isotopes of calcium up to at least ^{70}Ca, while ^{59}Ca is probably the last bound isotope with odd N. Earlier predictions had estimated the heaviest even isotope to be at ^{60}Ca, and ^{59}Ca unbound.

In the neutron-rich region, N = 40 becomes a magic number, so ^{60}Ca was considered early on to be a possibly doubly magic nucleus, as is observed for the ^{68}Ni isotone. However, subsequent spectroscopic measurements of the nearby nuclides ^{56}Ca, ^{58}Ca, and ^{62}Ti instead predict that it should lie on the island of inversion known to exist around ^{64}Cr.

== See also ==
Daughter products other than calcium

- Isotopes of titanium
- Isotopes of scandium
- Isotopes of potassium
- Isotopes of argon
