= Isotopes of potassium =

Isotopes of potassium (_{19}K)
Main isotopes			Decay	
Isotope	abundance	half-life (t_{1/2})	mode	product
^{39}K	93.258%	stable		
^{40}K	0.0117%	1.248×10^{9} y	β^{−}	^{40}Ca
^{40}K	0.0117%	1.248×10^{9} y	ε	^{40}Ar
^{40}K	0.0117%	1.248×10^{9} y	β^{+}	^{40}Ar
^{41}K	6.730%	stable		

Standard atomic weight A_{r}°(K)
- 39.0983±0.0001; 39.098±0.001 (abridged)

Potassium (_{19}K) has 25 known isotopes from ^{34}K to ^{57}K as well as ^{31}K, as well as an unconfirmed report of ^{59}K. Three of those isotopes occur naturally: the two stable forms ^{39}K (93.26%) and ^{41}K (6.72%), and the long-lived radioisotope ^{40}K (0.012%).

Naturally occurring radioactive ^{40}K decays with a half-life of 1.248×10^{9} years. 89% of those decays are to stable ^{40}Ca by beta decay, whilst 11% are to ^{40}Ar by either electron capture or positron emission. This latter decay branch has produced an isotopic abundance of argon on Earth which differs greatly from that seen in gas giants and stellar spectra. ^{40}K has the longest known half-life for any positron-emitting nuclide. The long half-life of this primordial radioisotope is caused by a highly spin-forbidden transition: ^{40}K has a nuclear spin of 4, while both of its decay daughters are even–even isotopes with spins of 0.

^{40}K occurs in natural potassium in sufficient quantity that large bags of potassium chloride commercial salt substitutes can be used as a radioactive source for classroom demonstrations. ^{40}K is the largest source of natural radioactivity in healthy animals and humans, greater even than ^{14}C. In a human body of 70 kg mass, about 4,300 nuclei of ^{40}K decay per second.

The decay of ^{40}K to ^{40}Ar is used in potassium-argon dating of rocks. Minerals are dated by measurement of the concentration of potassium and the amount of radiogenic ^{40}Ar that has accumulated. ^{40}K has also been extensively used as a radioactive tracer in studies of weathering.

All other potassium isotopes have half-lives under a day, most under a minute. The unbound ^{31}K was discovered in 2019 and emits three protons; its half-life was measured to be shorter than 10 picoseconds.

Stable potassium isotopes have been used for several nutrient cycling studies since potassium is a macronutrient required for life.

== List of isotopes ==
Nuclide (Note: ^{m}K – Excited nuclear isomer.)	Z	N	Isotopic mass (Da) (Note: ( ) – Uncertainty (1σ) is given in concise form in parentheses after the corresponding last digits.) (Note: # – Atomic mass marked #: value and uncertainty derived not from purely experimental data, but at least partly from trends from the Mass Surface (TMS).)	Discovery year	Half-life (Note: # – Values marked # are not purely derived from experimental data, but at least partly from trends of neighboring nuclides (TNN).)	Decay mode	Daughter isotope (Note: Bold symbol as daughter – Daughter product is stable.)	Spin and parity (Note: ( ) spin value – Indicates spin with weak assignment arguments.)	Natural abundance (mole fraction)	
Nuclide	Excitation energy			Discovery year	Half-life	Decay mode	Daughter isotope	Spin and parity	Normal proportion	Range of variation
^{31}K	19	12	31.03678(32)#	2019	<10 ps	p	^{30}Ar	3/2+#		
^{34}K	19	15	33.998404(18)	2024		p	^{33}Ar			
^{35}K	19	16	34.98800541(55)	1976	175.2(19) ms	β^{+} (99.63%)	^{35}Ar	3/2+		
^{35}K	19	16	34.98800541(55)	1976	175.2(19) ms	β^{+}, p (0.37%)	^{34}Cl	3/2+		
^{36}K	19	17	35.98130189(35)	1967	341(3) ms	β^{+} (99.95%)	^{36}Ar	2+		
^{36}K	19	17	35.98130189(35)	1967	341(3) ms	β^{+}, p (0.048%)	^{35}Cl	2+		
^{36}K	19	17	35.98130189(35)	1967	341(3) ms	β^{+}, α (0.0034%)	^{32}S	2+		
^{37}K	19	18	36.97337589(10)	1958	1.23651(94) s	β^{+}	^{37}Ar	3/2+		
^{38}K	19	19	37.96908111(21)	1937	7.651(19) min	β^{+}	^{38}Ar	3+		
^{38m1}K	130.15(4) keV			1953	924.35(12) ms	β^{+} (99.97%)	^{38}Ar	0+		
^{38m1}K	130.15(4) keV			1953	924.35(12) ms	IT (0.0330%)	^{38}K	0+		
^{38m2}K	3458.10(17) keV			1974	21.95(11) μs	IT	^{38}K	(7)+		
^{39}K	19	20	38.9637064848(49)	1918	Stable			3/2+	0.932581(44)	
^{40}K (Note: Used in potassium-argon dating) (Note: Primordial radionuclide)	19	21	39.963998165(60)	1935	1.248(3)×10^{9} y	β^{−} (89.28%)	^{40}Ca	4−	1.17(1)×10^{−4}	
^{40}K	19	21	39.963998165(60)	1935	1.248(3)×10^{9} y	EC (10.72%)	^{40}Ar	4−	1.17(1)×10^{−4}	
^{40}K	19	21	39.963998165(60)	1935	1.248(3)×10^{9} y	β^{+} (0.001%)	^{40}Ar	4−	1.17(1)×10^{−4}	
^{40m}K	1643.638(11) keV			1968	336(12) ns	IT	^{40}K	0+		
^{41}K	19	22	40.9618252561(40)	1921	Stable			3/2+	0.067302(44)	
^{42}K	19	23	41.96240231(11)	1935	12.355(7) h	β^{−}	^{42}Ca	2−		
^{43}K	19	24	42.96073470(44)	1949	22.3(1) h	β^{−}	^{43}Ca	3/2+		
^{43m}K	738.30(6) keV			1975	200(5) ns	IT	^{43}K	7/2−		
^{44}K	19	25	43.96158698(45)	1954	22.13(19) min	β^{−}	^{44}Ca	2−		
^{45}K	19	26	44.96069149(56)	1964	17.8(6) min	β^{−}	^{45}Ca	3/2+		
^{46}K	19	27	45.96198158(78)	1965	96.30(8) s	β^{−}	^{46}Ca	2−		
^{47}K	19	28	46.9616616(15)	1964	17.38(3) s	β^{−}	^{47}Ca	1/2+		
^{48}K	19	29	47.96534118(83)	1972	6.83(14) s	β^{−} (98.86%)	^{48}Ca	1−		
^{48}K	19	29	47.96534118(83)	1972	6.83(14) s	β^{−}, n (1.14%)	^{47}Ca	1−		
^{49}K	19	30	48.96821075(86)	1972	1.26(5) s	β^{−}, n (86%)	^{48}Ca	1/2+		
^{49}K	19	30	48.96821075(86)	1972	1.26(5) s	β^{−} (14%)	^{49}Ca	1/2+		
^{50}K	19	31	49.9723800(83)	1972	472(4) ms	β^{−} (71.4%)	^{50}Ca	0−		
^{50}K	19	31	49.9723800(83)	1972	472(4) ms	β^{−}, n (28.6%)	^{49}Ca	0−		
^{50}K	19	31	49.9723800(83)	1972	472(4) ms	β^{−}, 2n?	^{48}Ca	0−		
^{50m}K	172.0(4) keV			2010	125(40) ns	IT	^{50}K	(2−)		
^{51}K	19	32	50.975828(14)	1983	365(5) ms	β^{−}, n (65%)	^{50}Ca	3/2+		
^{51}K	19	32	50.975828(14)	1983	365(5) ms	β^{−} (35%)	^{51}Ca	3/2+		
^{51}K	19	32	50.975828(14)	1983	365(5) ms	β^{−}, 2n?	^{49}Ca	3/2+		
^{52}K	19	33	51.981602(36)	1983	110(4) ms	β^{−}, n (72.2%)	^{51}Ca	2−#		
^{52}K	19	33	51.981602(36)	1983	110(4) ms	β^{−} (25.5%)	^{52}Ca	2−#		
^{52}K	19	33	51.981602(36)	1983	110(4) ms	β^{−}, 2n (2.3%)	^{50}Ca	2−#		
^{53}K	19	34	52.98680(12)	1983	30(5) ms	β^{−}, n (64%)	^{52}Ca	3/2+		
^{53}K	19	34	52.98680(12)	1983	30(5) ms	β^{−} (26%)	^{53}Ca	3/2+		
^{53}K	19	34	52.98680(12)	1983	30(5) ms	β^{−}, 2n (10%)	^{51}Ca	3/2+		
^{54}K	19	35	53.99447(43)#	1983	10(5) ms	β^{−}	^{54}Ca	2−#		
^{54}K	19	35	53.99447(43)#	1983	10(5) ms	β^{−}, n?	^{53}Ca	2−#		
^{54}K	19	35	53.99447(43)#	1983	10(5) ms	β^{−}, 2n?	^{52}Ca	2−#		
^{55}K	19	36	55.00051(54)#	2009	10# ms [>620 ns]	β^{−}?	^{55}Ca	3/2+#		
^{55}K	19	36	55.00051(54)#	2009	10# ms [>620 ns]	β^{−}, n?	^{54}Ca	3/2+#		
^{55}K	19	36	55.00051(54)#	2009	10# ms [>620 ns]	β^{−}, 2n?	^{53}Ca	3/2+#		
^{56}K	19	37	56.00857(64)#	2009	5# ms [>620 ns]	β^{−}?	^{56}Ca	2−#		
^{56}K	19	37	56.00857(64)#	2009	5# ms [>620 ns]	β^{−}, n?	^{55}Ca	2−#		
^{56}K	19	37	56.00857(64)#	2009	5# ms [>620 ns]	β^{−}, 2n?	^{54}Ca	2−#		
^{57}K	19	38	57.01517(64)#	2018	2# ms [>400 ns]	β^{−}?	^{57}Ca	3/2+#		
^{57}K	19	38	57.01517(64)#	2018	2# ms [>400 ns]	β^{−}, n?	^{56}Ca	3/2+#		
^{57}K	19	38	57.01517(64)#	2018	2# ms [>400 ns]	β^{−}, 2n?	^{55}Ca	3/2+#		
^{59}K (Note: Discovery of this isotope is unconfirmed.)	19	40	59.03086(86)#	2018	1# ms [>400 ns]	β^{−}?	^{59}Ca	3/2+#		
^{59}K	19	40	59.03086(86)#	2018	1# ms [>400 ns]	β^{−}, n?	^{58}Ca	3/2+#		
^{59}K	19	40	59.03086(86)#	2018	1# ms [>400 ns]	β^{−}, 2n?	^{57}Ca	3/2+#		
This table header & footer:

== See also ==
- Banana equivalent dose

Daughter products other than potassium

- Isotopes of calcium
- Isotopes of argon
- Isotopes of chlorine
- Isotopes of sulfur
