= Chlorine =

Chlorine, _{17}Cl
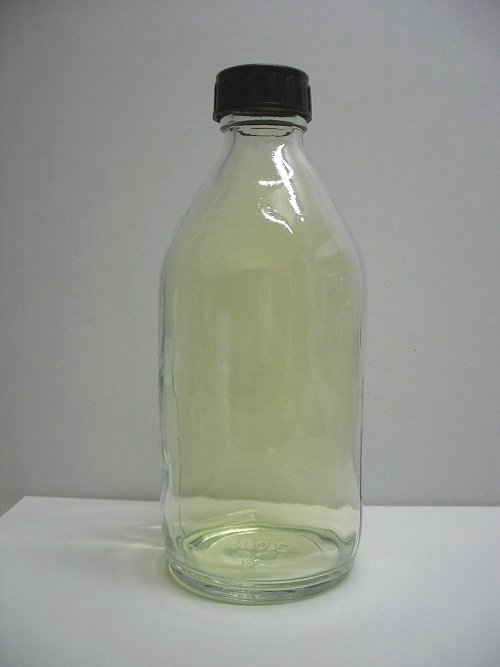

Chlorine
- Pronunciation: /ˈklɔːriːn, -aɪn/ (KLOR-een, -eyen)
- Appearance: pale yellow-green gas

Standard atomic weight A_{r}°(Cl)
- [35.446, 35.457]; 35.45±0.01 (abridged)

Chlorine in the periodic table
Hydrogen																															Helium
Lithium	Beryllium																									Boron	Carbon	Nitrogen	Oxygen	Fluorine	Neon
Sodium	Magnesium																									Aluminium	Silicon	Phosphorus	Sulfur	Chlorine	Argon
Potassium	Calcium															Scandium	Titanium	Vanadium	Chromium	Manganese	Iron	Cobalt	Nickel	Copper	Zinc	Gallium	Germanium	Arsenic	Selenium	Bromine	Krypton
Rubidium	Strontium															Yttrium	Zirconium	Niobium	Molybdenum	Technetium	Ruthenium	Rhodium	Palladium	Silver	Cadmium	Indium	Tin	Antimony	Tellurium	Iodine	Xenon
Caesium	Barium	Lanthanum	Cerium	Praseodymium	Neodymium	Promethium	Samarium	Europium	Gadolinium	Terbium	Dysprosium	Holmium	Erbium	Thulium	Ytterbium	Lutetium	Hafnium	Tantalum	Tungsten	Rhenium	Osmium	Iridium	Platinum	Gold	Mercury (element)	Thallium	Lead	Bismuth	Polonium	Astatine	Radon
Francium	Radium	Actinium	Thorium	Protactinium	Uranium	Neptunium	Plutonium	Americium	Curium	Berkelium	Californium	Einsteinium	Fermium	Mendelevium	Nobelium	Lawrencium	Rutherfordium	Dubnium	Seaborgium	Bohrium	Hassium	Meitnerium	Darmstadtium	Roentgenium	Copernicium	Nihonium	Flerovium	Moscovium	Livermorium	Tennessine	Oganesson
F
↑
Cl
↓
Br
sulfur ← chlorine → argon
- Atomic number (Z): 17
- Group: group 17 (halogens)
- Period: period 3
- Block: p-block
- Electron configuration: [Ne] 3s^{2} 3p^{5}
- Electrons per shell: 2, 8, 7

Physical properties
- Phase at STP: gas
- Melting point: (Cl_{2}) 171.6 K (−101.5 °C, −150.7 °F)
- Boiling point: (Cl_{2}) 239.11 K (−34.04 °C, −29.27 °F)
- Density (at STP): 3.2 g/L
- when liquid (at b.p.): 1.5625 g/cm^{3}
- Triple point: 172.22 K, 1.392 kPa
- Critical point: 416.9 K, 7.991 MPa
- Heat of fusion: (Cl_{2}) 6.406 kJ/mol
- Heat of vaporisation: (Cl_{2}) 20.41 kJ/mol
- Molar heat capacity: 16.9745 J/(mol·K) (Cl); 33.949 J/(mol·K) (Cl_{2})
- Specific heat capacity: 478.829 J/(kg·K) (Cl)
Vapour pressure
P (Pa)	1	10	100	1 k	10 k	100 k
at T (K)	128	139	153	170	197	239

Atomic properties
- Oxidation states: common: −1, +1, +3, +5, +7; 0, +2, +4, +6
- Electronegativity: Pauling scale: 3.16
- Ionisation energies: 1st: 1251.2 kJ/mol; 2nd: 2298 kJ/mol; 3rd: 3822 kJ/mol; (more)
- Covalent radius: 102±4 pm
- Van der Waals radius: 175 pm
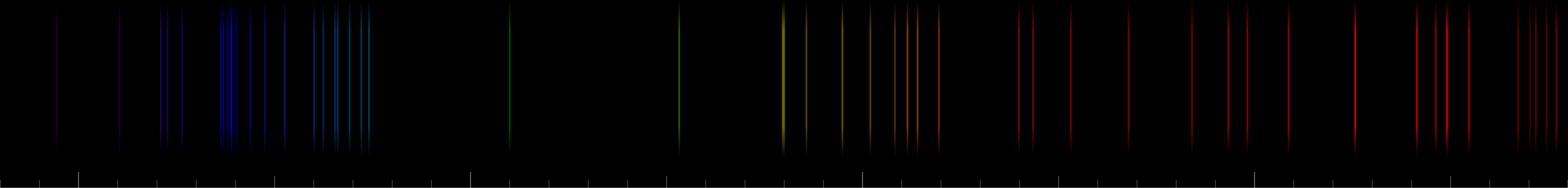
- Spectral lines of chlorine

Other properties
- Natural occurrence: primordial
- Crystal structure: orthorhombic (oS8)
- Lattice constants: a = 630.80 pm b = 455.83 pm c = 815.49 pm (at triple point)
- Thermal conductivity: 8.9×10^{−3} W/(m⋅K)
- Electrical resistivity: >10 Ω⋅m (at 20 °C)
- Magnetic ordering: diamagnetic
- Molar magnetic susceptibility: −40.5×10^{−6} cm^{3}/mol
- Speed of sound: 206 m/s (gas, at 0 °C)
- CAS Number: Cl_{2}: 7782-50-5

History
- Naming: after the Ancient Greek χλωρός ("pale green") because of its colour
- Discovery and first isolation: Carl Wilhelm Scheele (1774)
- Recognized as an element by: Humphry Davy (1808)

Isotopes of chlorine
Main isotopes			Decay	
Isotope	abundance	half-life (t_{1/2})	mode	product
^{35}Cl	75.8%	stable		
^{36}Cl	trace	3.01×10^{5} y	β^{−}	^{36}Ar
^{36}Cl	trace	3.01×10^{5} y	ε	^{36}S
^{37}Cl	24.2%	stable		

Chlorine is a chemical element; it has symbol Cl and atomic number 17. The second-lightest of the halogens, it appears between fluorine and bromine in the periodic table and its properties are mostly intermediate between them. Chlorine is a yellow-green gas at room temperature. It is an extremely reactive element and a strong oxidising agent: among the elements, it has the highest electron affinity and the third-highest electronegativity on the revised Pauling scale, behind only oxygen and fluorine.

Chlorine played an important role in the experiments conducted by medieval alchemists, which commonly involved the heating of chloride salts like ammonium chloride (sal ammoniac) and sodium chloride (table salt), producing various chemical substances containing chlorine such as hydrogen chloride, mercury(II) chloride (corrosive sublimate), and aqua regia. However, the nature of free chlorine gas as a separate substance was only recognised around 1630 by Jan Baptist van Helmont. Carl Wilhelm Scheele wrote a description of chlorine gas in 1774, supposing it to be an oxide of a new element. In 1809, chemists suggested that the gas might be a pure element, and this was confirmed by Sir Humphry Davy in 1810, who named it after the Ancient Greek χλωρός (khlōrós, "pale green") because of its colour.

Because of its great reactivity, all chlorine in the Earth's crust is in the form of ionic chloride compounds, which includes table salt. It is the second-most abundant halogen (after fluorine) and 20th most abundant element in Earth's crust. These crystal deposits are nevertheless dwarfed by the huge reserves of chloride in seawater.

Elemental chlorine is commercially produced from brine by electrolysis, predominantly in the chloralkali process. The high oxidising potential of elemental chlorine led to the development of commercial bleaches and disinfectants, and a reagent for many processes in the chemical industry. Chlorine is used in the manufacture of a wide range of consumer products, about two-thirds of them organic chemicals such as polyvinyl chloride (PVC), many intermediates for the production of plastics, and other end products which do not contain the element. As a common disinfectant, elemental chlorine and chlorine-generating compounds are used more directly in swimming pools to keep them sanitary. Elemental chlorine at high concentration is extremely dangerous, and poisonous to most living organisms. As a chemical warfare agent, chlorine was first used in World War I as a poison gas weapon.

In the form of chloride ions, chlorine is necessary to all known species of life. Other types of chlorine compounds are rare in living organisms, and artificially produced chlorinated organics range from inert to toxic. In the upper atmosphere, chlorine-containing organic molecules such as chlorofluorocarbons have been implicated in ozone depletion. Small quantities of elemental chlorine are generated by oxidation of chloride ions in neutrophils as part of an immune system response against bacteria.

== History ==
The most common compound of chlorine, sodium chloride, has been known since ancient times; archaeologists have found evidence that rock salt was used as early as 3000 BC and brine as early as 6000 BC.

=== Early discoveries ===
Around 900, the authors of the Arabic writings attributed to Jabir ibn Hayyan (Latin: Geber) and the Persian physician and alchemist Abu Bakr al-Razi (c. 865–925, Latin: Rhazes) were experimenting with sal ammoniac (ammonium chloride), which when it was distilled together with vitriol (hydrated sulfates of various metals) produced hydrogen chloride. However, it appears that in these early experiments with chloride salts, the gaseous products were discarded, and hydrogen chloride may have been produced many times before it was discovered that it can be put to chemical use. One of the first such uses was the synthesis of mercury(II) chloride (corrosive sublimate), whose production from the heating of mercury either with alum and ammonium chloride or with vitriol and sodium chloride was first described in the De aluminibus et salibus ("On Alums and Salts", an eleventh- or twelfth century Arabic text falsely attributed to Abu Bakr al-Razi and translated into Latin in the second half of the twelfth century by Gerard of Cremona, 1144–1187). Another important development was the discovery by pseudo-Geber (in the De inventione veritatis, "On the Discovery of Truth", after c. 1300) that by adding ammonium chloride to nitric acid, a strong solvent capable of dissolving gold (i.e., aqua regia) could be produced. Although aqua regia is an unstable mixture that continually gives off fumes containing free chlorine gas, this chlorine gas appears to have been ignored until c. 1630, when its nature as a separate gaseous substance was recognised by the Brabantian chemist and physician Jan Baptist van Helmont. (Note: van Helmont, Joannis Baptistae (1682). Opera omnia [All Works] (in Latin). Frankfurt-am-Main, (Germany): Johann Just Erythropel. From "Complexionum atque mistionum elementalium figmentum." (Formation of combinations and of mixtures of elements), §37, p. 105: "Accipe salis petrae, vitrioli, & alumnis partes aequas: exsiccato singula, & connexis simul, distilla aquam. Quae nil aliud est, quam merum sal volatile. Hujus accipe uncias quatuor, salis armeniaci unciam junge, in forti vitro, alembico, per caementum (ex cera, colophonia, & vitri pulverre) calidissime affusum, firmato; mox, etiam in frigore, Gas excitatur, & vas, utut forte, dissilit cum fragore." (Take equal parts of saltpeter [i.e., sodium nitrate], vitriol [i.e., concentrated sulfuric acid], and alum: dry each and combine simultaneously; distill off the water [i.e., liquid]. That [distillate] is nothing else than pure volatile salt [i.e., spirit of nitre, nitric acid]. Take four ounces of this [viz, nitric acid], add one ounce of Armenian salt [i.e., ammonium chloride], [place it] in a strong glass alembic sealed by cement ([made] from wax, rosin, and powdered glass) [that has been] poured very hot; soon, even in the cold, gas is stimulated, and the vessel, however strong, bursts into fragments.) From "De Flatibus" (On gases), p. 408: "Sal armeniacus enim, & aqua chrysulca, quae singula per se distillari, possunt, & pati calorem: sin autem jungantur, & intepescant, non possunt non, quin statim in Gas sylvestre, sive incoercibilem flatum transmutentur." (Truly Armenian salt [i.e., ammonium chloride] and nitric acid, each of which can be distilled by itself, and submitted to heat; but if, on the other hand, they be combined and become warm, they cannot but be changed immediately into carbon dioxide [note: van Helmont's identification of the gas is mistaken] or an incondensable gas.) See also: Helmont, Johannes (Joan) Baptista Van, Encyclopedia.Com: "Others were chlorine gas from the reaction of nitric acid and sal ammoniac; ... "; Wisniak, Jaime (2009) "Carl Wilhelm Scheele," Revista CENIC Ciencias Químicas, 40 (3): 165–73; see p. 168: "Early in the seventeenth century Johannes Baptiste van Helmont (1579–1644) mentioned that when sal marin (sodium chloride) or sal ammoniacus and aqua chrysulca (nitric acid) were mixed together, a flatus incoercible (non-condensable gas) was evolved.")

=== Isolation ===
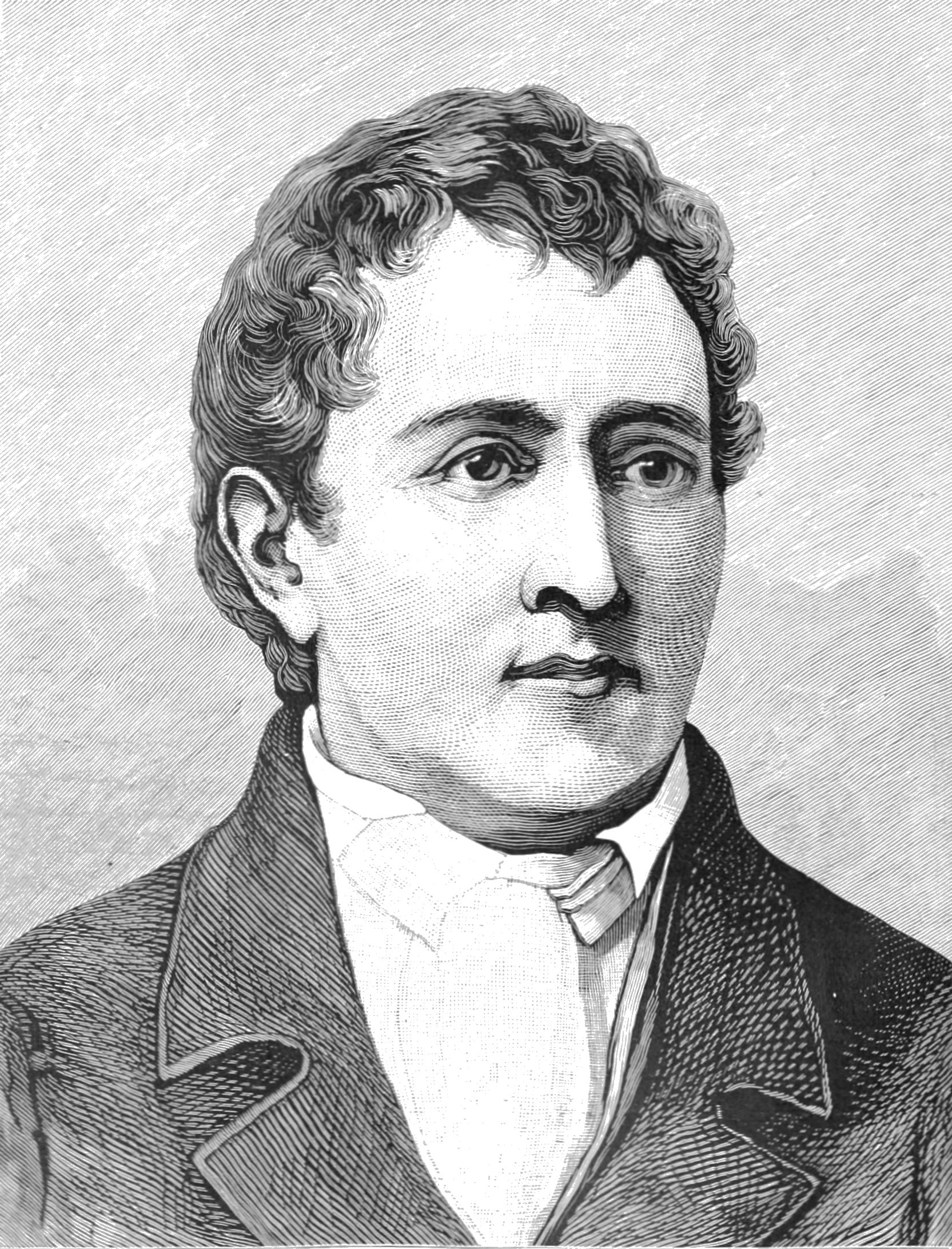
Carl Wilhelm Scheele, discoverer of chlorine

The element was first studied in detail in 1774 by Swedish chemist Carl Wilhelm Scheele, and he is credited with the discovery. Scheele produced chlorine by reacting MnO_{2} (as the mineral pyrolusite) with HCl:

4 HCl + MnO_{2} → MnCl_{2} + 2 H_{2}O + Cl_{2}

Scheele observed several of the properties of chlorine: the bleaching effect on litmus, the deadly effect on insects, the yellow-green colour, and the smell similar to aqua regia. He called it "dephlogisticated muriatic acid air" since it is a gas (then called "airs") and it came from hydrochloric acid (then known as "muriatic acid"). He failed to establish chlorine as an element.

Common chemical theory at that time held that an acid is a compound that contains oxygen (the element's name is from the Greek roots oxys ("acid") and -genēs ("producer", literally 'begetter'), so a number of chemists, including Claude Berthollet, suggested that Scheele's dephlogisticated muriatic acid air must be a combination of oxygen and the yet undiscovered element, muriaticum.

In 1809, Joseph Louis Gay-Lussac and Louis-Jacques Thénard tried to decompose dephlogisticated muriatic acid air by reacting it with charcoal to release the free element muriaticum (and carbon dioxide). They did not succeed and published a report in which they considered the possibility that dephlogisticated muriatic acid air is an element, but were not convinced.

In 1810, Sir Humphry Davy tried the same experiment again, and concluded that the substance was an element, and not a compound. He announced his results to the Royal Society on 15 November that year. At that time, he named this new element "chlorine", from the Greek word χλωρος (chlōros, "green-yellow"), in reference to its colour. The name "halogen", meaning "salt producer", was originally used for chlorine in 1811 by Johann Salomo Christoph Schweigger. This term was later used as a generic term to describe all the elements in the chlorine family (fluorine, bromine, iodine), after a suggestion by Jöns Jakob Berzelius in 1826. In 1823, Michael Faraday liquefied chlorine for the first time, and demonstrated that what was then known as "solid chlorine" had a structure of chlorine hydrate (Cl_{2}·H_{2}O).

=== Later uses ===
Chlorine gas was first used by French chemist Claude Berthollet to bleach textiles in 1785. Modern bleaches resulted from further work by Berthollet, who first produced sodium hypochlorite in 1789 in his laboratory in the town of Javel (now part of Paris, France), by passing chlorine gas through a solution of sodium carbonate. The resulting liquid, known as "Eau de Javel" ("Javel water"), was a weak solution of sodium hypochlorite. This process was not very efficient, and alternative production methods were sought. Scottish chemist and industrialist Charles Tennant first produced a solution of calcium hypochlorite ("chlorinated lime"), then solid calcium hypochlorite (bleaching powder). These compounds produced low levels of elemental chlorine and could be more efficiently transported than sodium hypochlorite, which remained as dilute solutions because when purified to eliminate water, it became a dangerously powerful and unstable oxidiser. Near the end of the nineteenth century, E. S. Smith patented a method of sodium hypochlorite production involving electrolysis of brine to produce sodium hydroxide and chlorine gas, which then mixed to form sodium hypochlorite. This is known as the chloralkali process, first introduced on an industrial scale in 1892, and now the source of most elemental chlorine and sodium hydroxide. In 1884, the Chemische Fabrik Griesheim in Germany developed another chloralkali process which entered commercial production in 1888.

Elemental chlorine solutions dissolved in chemically basic water (sodium and calcium hypochlorite) were first used as anti-putrefaction agents and disinfectants in the 1820s, in France, long before the establishment of the germ theory of disease. This practice was pioneered by Antoine-Germain Labarraque, who adapted Berthollet's "Javel water" bleach and other chlorine preparations. Elemental chlorine has since served a continuous function in topical antisepsis (wound irrigation solutions and the like) and public sanitation, particularly in swimming and drinking water.

Chlorine gas was first used as a weapon on 22 April 1915 at the Second Battle of Ypres by the German Army. The effect on the Allied forces was devastating because the existing gas masks were difficult to deploy and had not been broadly distributed.

== Properties ==
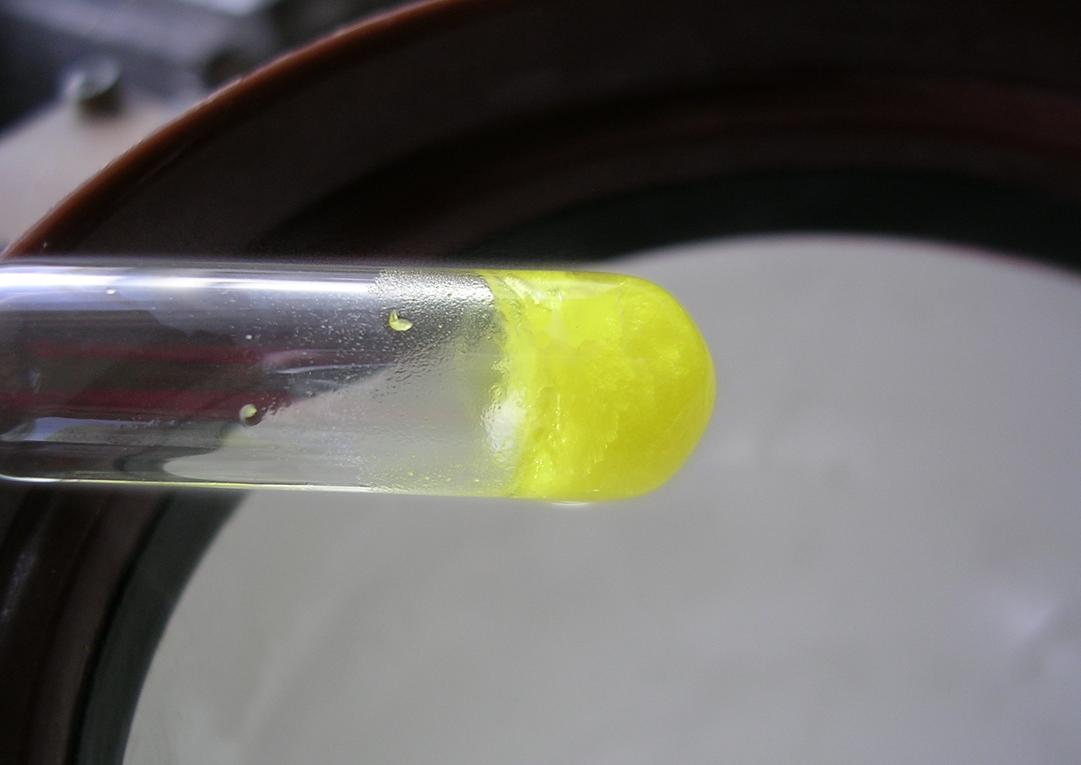
Solid chlorine at −150 °C

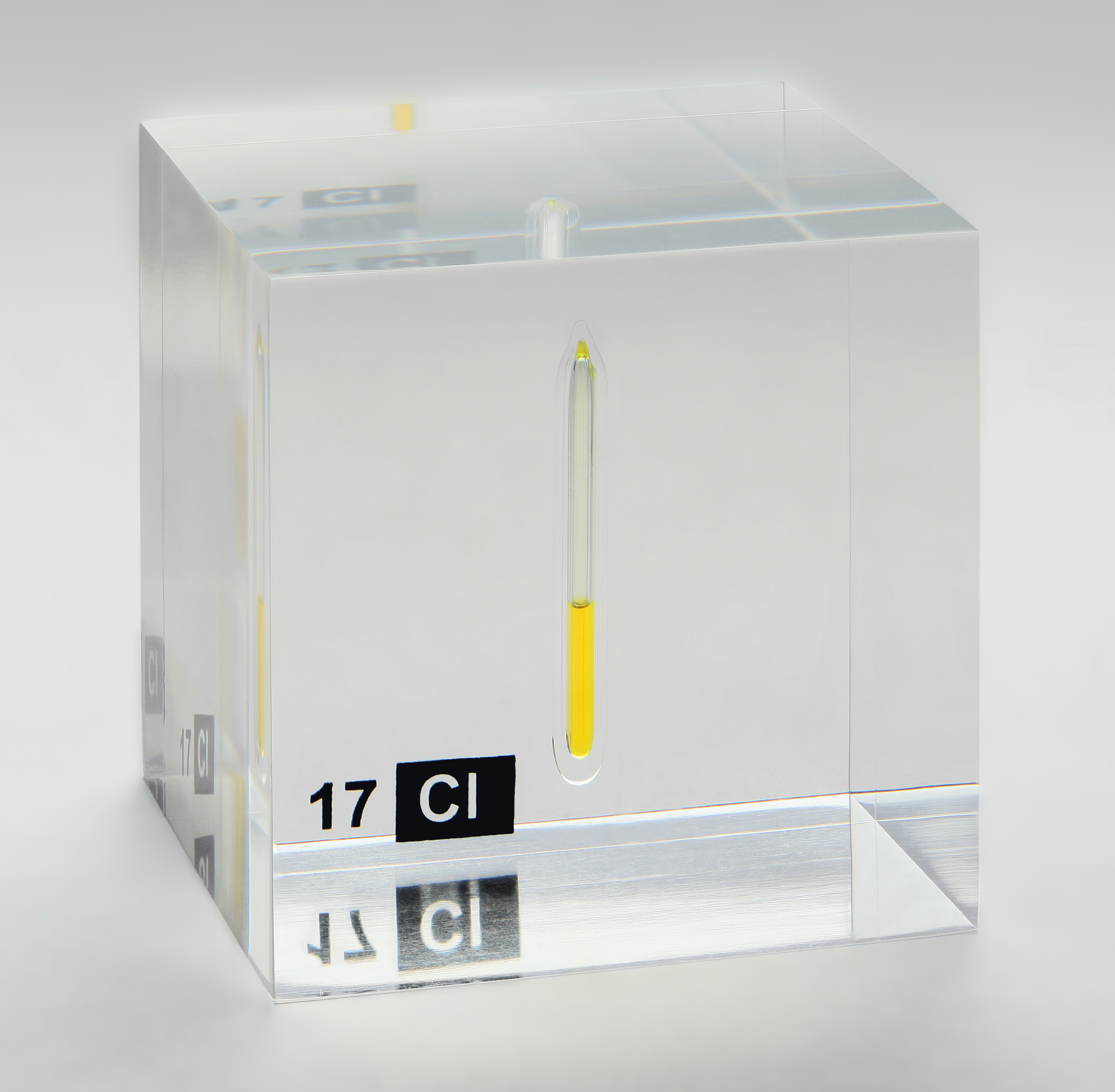
Chlorine, liquefied under a pressure of 7.4 bar at room temperature, displayed in a quartz ampule embedded in acrylic glass

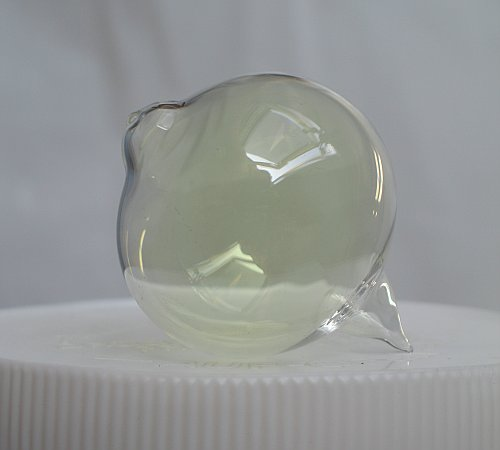
Gaseous chlorine stored inside a spherical container.

Chlorine is the second halogen, being a nonmetal in group 17 of the periodic table. Its properties are thus similar to fluorine, bromine, and iodine, and are largely intermediate between those of the first two. Chlorine has the electron configuration [Ne]3s^{2}3p^{5}, with the seven electrons in the third and outermost shell acting as its valence electrons. Like all halogens, it is thus one electron short of a full octet, and is hence a strong oxidising agent, reacting with many elements in order to complete its outer shell. Corresponding to periodic trends, it is intermediate in electronegativity between fluorine and bromine (F: 3.98, Cl: 3.16, Br: 2.96, I: 2.66), and is less reactive than fluorine and more reactive than bromine. It is also a weaker oxidising agent than fluorine, but a stronger one than bromine. Conversely, the chloride ion is a weaker reducing agent than bromide, but a stronger one than fluoride. It is intermediate in atomic radius between fluorine and bromine, and this leads to many of its atomic properties similarly continuing the trend from iodine to bromine upward, such as first ionisation energy, electron affinity, enthalpy of dissociation of the X_{2} molecule (X = Cl, Br, I), ionic radius, and X–X bond length. (Fluorine is anomalous due to its small size.)

All four stable halogens experience intermolecular van der Waals forces of attraction, and their strength increases together with the number of electrons among all homonuclear diatomic halogen molecules. Thus, the melting and boiling points of chlorine are intermediate between those of fluorine and bromine: chlorine melts at −101.0 °C and boils at −34.0 °C. As a result of the increasing molecular weight of the halogens down the group, the density and heats of fusion and vaporisation of chlorine are again intermediate between those of bromine and fluorine, although all their heats of vaporisation are fairly low (leading to high volatility) thanks to their diatomic molecular structure. The halogens darken in colour as the group is descended: thus, while fluorine is a pale yellow gas, chlorine is distinctly yellow-green. This trend occurs because the wavelengths of visible light absorbed by the halogens increase down the group. Specifically, the colour of a halogen, such as chlorine, results from the electron transition between the highest occupied antibonding π_{g} molecular orbital and the lowest vacant antibonding σ_{u} molecular orbital. The colour fades at low temperatures, so that solid chlorine at −195 °C is almost colourless.

Like solid bromine and iodine, solid chlorine crystallises in the orthorhombic crystal system, in a layered lattice of Cl_{2} molecules. The Cl–Cl distance is 198 pm (close to the gaseous Cl–Cl distance of 199 pm) and the Cl···Cl distance between molecules is 332 pm within a layer and 382 pm between layers (compare the van der Waals radius of chlorine, 180 pm). This structure means that chlorine is a very poor conductor of electricity, and indeed its conductivity is so low as to be practically unmeasurable.

=== Isotopes ===
Chlorine has two stable isotopes, ^{35}Cl and ^{37}Cl. These are its only two natural isotopes occurring in quantity, with ^{35}Cl making up 76% of natural chlorine and ^{37}Cl making up the remaining 24%. Both are synthesised in stars in the oxygen-burning and silicon-burning processes. Both have nuclear spin 3/2+ and thus may be used for nuclear magnetic resonance, although the spin magnitude being greater than 1/2 results in non-spherical nuclear charge distribution and thus resonance broadening as a result of a nonzero nuclear quadrupole moment and resultant quadrupolar relaxation. The other chlorine isotopes are all radioactive, with half-lives too short to occur in nature primordially. Of these, the most commonly used in the laboratory are ^{36}Cl (t_{1/2} = 3.0×10^{5} y) and ^{38}Cl (t_{1/2} = 37.2 min), which may be produced from the neutron activation of natural chlorine.

The most stable chlorine radioisotope is ^{36}Cl. The primary decay mode of isotopes lighter than ^{35}Cl is electron capture to isotopes of sulfur; that of isotopes heavier than ^{37}Cl is beta decay to isotopes of argon; and ^{36}Cl may decay by either mode to stable ^{36}S or ^{36}Ar. ^{36}Cl occurs in trace quantities in nature as a cosmogenic nuclide in a ratio of about (7–10)×10^{−13} to 1 with stable chlorine isotopes: it is produced in the atmosphere by spallation of ^{36}Ar by interactions with cosmic ray protons. In the top meter of the lithosphere, ^{36}Cl is generated primarily by thermal neutron activation of ^{35}Cl and spallation of ^{39}K and ^{40}Ca. In the subsurface environment, muon capture by ^{40}Ca becomes more important as a way to generate ^{36}Cl.

== Chemistry and compounds ==
Halogen bond energies (kJ/mol)
X	XX	HX	BX_{3}	AlX_{3}	CX_{4}
F	159	574	645	582	456
Cl	243	428	444	427	327
Br	193	363	368	360	272
I	151	294	272	285	239

Chlorine is intermediate in reactivity between fluorine and bromine, and is one of the most reactive elements. Chlorine is a weaker oxidising agent than fluorine but a stronger one than bromine or iodine. This can be seen from the standard electrode potentials of the X/X^{−} couples (F, +2.866 V; Cl, +1.395 V; Br, +1.087 V; I, +0.615 V; At, approximately +0.3 V). However, this trend is not shown in the bond energies because fluorine is singular due to its small size, low polarisability, and inability to show hypervalence. As another difference, chlorine has a significant chemistry in positive oxidation states while fluorine does not. Chlorination often leads to higher oxidation states than bromination or iodination but lower oxidation states than fluorination. Chlorine tends to react with compounds including M–M, M–H, or M–C bonds to form M–Cl bonds.

Given that E^{⦵} (O_{2}/_{2} H_{2}O) = +1.229 V, which is less than +1.395 V, it would be expected that chlorine should be able to oxidise water to oxygen and hydrochloric acid. However, the kinetics of this reaction are unfavourable, and there is also a bubble overpotential effect to consider, so that electrolysis of aqueous chloride solutions evolves chlorine gas and not oxygen gas, a fact that is very useful for the industrial production of chlorine.

=== Hydrogen chloride ===
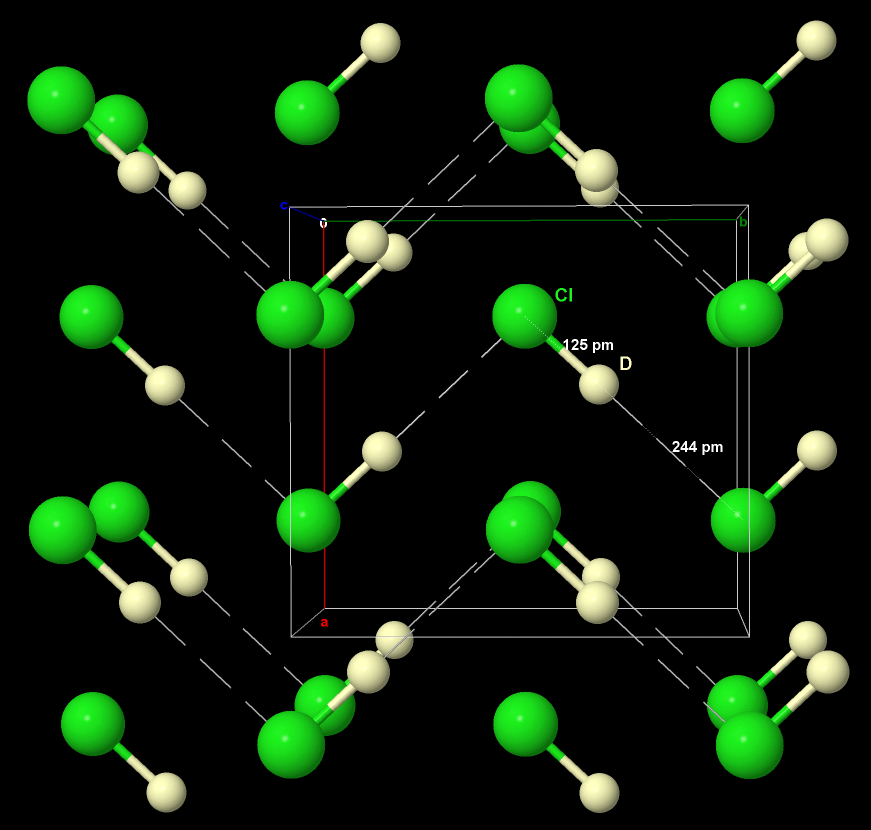
Structure of solid deuterium chloride, with D···Cl hydrogen bonds

The simplest chlorine compound is hydrogen chloride, HCl, a major chemical in industry as well as in the laboratory, both as a gas and dissolved in water as hydrochloric acid. It is often produced by burning hydrogen gas in chlorine gas, or as a byproduct of chlorinating hydrocarbons. Another approach is to treat sodium chloride with concentrated sulfuric acid to produce hydrochloric acid, also known as the "salt-cake" process:

NaCl + H_{2}SO_{4} $\ce{->[\ce{150 ^\circ C}]}$ NaHSO_{4} + HCl
NaCl + NaHSO_{4} $\ce{->[\ce{540-600 ^\circ C}]}$ Na_{2}SO_{4} + HCl

In the laboratory, hydrogen chloride gas may be made by drying the a concentrated aqueous solution of acid with concentrated sulfuric acid. Deuterium chloride, DCl, may be produced by reacting benzoyl chloride with heavy water (D_{2}O).

At room temperature, hydrogen chloride is a colourless gas, like all the hydrogen halides apart from hydrogen fluoride, since hydrogen cannot form strong hydrogen bonds to the larger electronegative chlorine atom; however, weak hydrogen bonding is present in solid crystalline hydrogen chloride at low temperatures, similar to the hydrogen fluoride structure, before disorder begins to prevail as the temperature is raised. Hydrochloric acid is a strong acid (pK_{a} = −7) because the hydrogen-chlorine bonds are too weak to inhibit dissociation. The HCl/H_{2}O system has many hydrates HCl·nH_{2}O for n = 1, 2, 3, 4, and 6. Beyond a 1:1 mixture of HCl and H_{2}O, the system separates completely into two separate liquid phases. Hydrochloric acid forms an azeotrope with boiling point 108.58 °C at 20.22 g HCl per 100 g solution; thus hydrochloric acid cannot be concentrated beyond this point by distillation.

Unlike hydrogen fluoride, anhydrous liquid hydrogen chloride is difficult to work with as a solvent, because its boiling point is low, it has a small liquid range, its dielectric constant is low and it does not dissociate appreciably into H_{2}Cl^{+} and HCl_{2}^{−} ions – the latter, in any case, are much less stable than the bifluoride ions (HF_{2}^{−}) due to the very weak hydrogen bonding between hydrogen and chlorine, though its salts with very large and weakly polarising cations such as Cs^{+} and NR_{4}^{+} (R = Me, Et, Bu_{n}) may still be isolated. Anhydrous hydrogen chloride is a poor solvent, only able to dissolve small molecular compounds such as nitrosyl chloride and phenol, or salts with very low lattice energies such as tetraalkylammonium halides. It readily protonates nucleophiles containing lone-pairs or π bonds. Solvolysis, ligand replacement reactions, and oxidations are well-characterised in hydrogen chloride solution:

Ph_{3}SnCl + HCl → Ph_{2}SnCl_{2} + PhH (solvolysis)
Ph_{3}COH + 3 HCl → Ph_{3}C^{+}HCl_{2}^{−} + H_{3}O^{+}Cl^{−} (solvolysis)
Me_{4}N^{+}HCl_{2}^{−} + BCl_{3} → Me_{4}N^{+}BCl_{4}^{−} + HCl (ligand replacement)
PCl_{3} + Cl_{2} + HCl → PCl_{4}^{+}HCl_{2}^{−} (oxidation)

=== Other binary chlorides ===
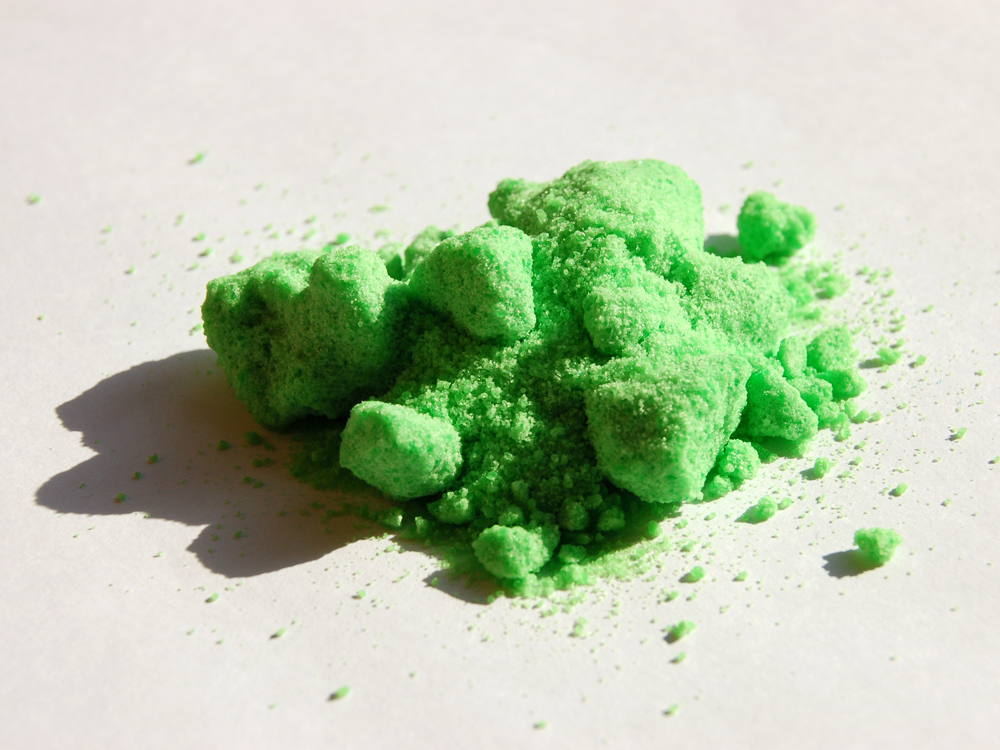
Hydrated nickel(II) chloride, NiCl_{2}·6H_{2}O

Nearly all elements in the periodic table form binary chlorides. The exceptions are decidedly in the minority and stem in each case from one of three causes: extreme inertness and reluctance to participate in chemical reactions (the noble gases, with the exception of xenon in the highly unstable XeCl_{2} and XeCl_{4}); extreme nuclear instability hampering chemical investigation before decay and transmutation (many of the heaviest elements beyond bismuth); and having an electronegativity higher than chlorine's (oxygen and fluorine) so that the resultant binary compounds are formally not chlorides but rather oxides or fluorides of chlorine. Even though nitrogen in NCl_{3} is bearing a negative charge, the compound is usually called nitrogen trichloride.

Chlorination of metals with Cl_{2} usually leads to a higher oxidation state than bromination with Br_{2} when multiple oxidation states are available, such as in MoCl_{5} and MoBr_{3}. Chlorides can be made by reaction of an element or its oxide, hydroxide, or carbonate with hydrochloric acid, and then dehydrated by mildly high temperatures combined with either low pressure or anhydrous hydrogen chloride gas. These methods work best when the chloride product is stable to hydrolysis; otherwise, the possibilities include high-temperature oxidative chlorination of the element with chlorine or hydrogen chloride, high-temperature chlorination of a metal oxide or other halide by chlorine, a volatile metal chloride, carbon tetrachloride, or an organic chloride. For instance, zirconium dioxide reacts with chlorine at standard conditions to produce zirconium tetrachloride, and uranium trioxide reacts with hexachloropropene when heated under reflux to give uranium tetrachloride. The second example also involves a reduction in oxidation state, which can also be achieved by reducing a higher chloride using hydrogen or a metal as a reducing agent. This may also be achieved by thermal decomposition or disproportionation as follows:

2 EuCl_{3} + H_{2} → EuCl_{2} + HCl
ReCl_{5} $\ce{->[\ce{at\ bp}]}$ ReCl_{3} + Cl_{2}
AuCl_{3} $\ce{->[\ce{160 ^\circ C}]}$ AuCl + Cl_{2}

Most metal chlorides with the metal in low oxidation states (+1 to +3) are ionic. Nonmetals tend to form covalent molecular chlorides, as do metals in high oxidation states from +3 and above. Both ionic and covalent chlorides are known for metals in oxidation state +3 (e.g. scandium chloride is mostly ionic, but aluminium chloride is not). Silver chloride is very insoluble in water and is thus often used as a qualitative test for chlorine.

=== Polychlorine compounds ===
Although dichlorine is a strong oxidising agent with a high first ionisation energy, it may be oxidised under extreme conditions to form the [Cl_{2}]^{+} cation. This is very unstable and has only been characterised by its electronic band spectrum when produced in a low-pressure discharge tube. The yellow [Cl_{3}]^{+} cation is more stable and may be produced as follows:

Cl_{2} + ClF + AsF_{5} $\ce{->[\ce{-78 ^\circ C}]}$ [Cl_{3}]^{+}[AsF_{6}]^{−}

This reaction is conducted in the oxidising solvent arsenic pentafluoride. The trichloride anion, [Cl_{3}]^{−}, has also been characterised; it is analogous to triiodide.

The blue [Cl_{4}]^{+} cation is formed by oxidation of elemental chlorine with IrF_{6}:

2Cl_{2} + IrF_{6} $\ce{->[\ce{-196 ^\circ C}]}$ [Cl_{4}]^{+}[IrF_{6}]^{−}

This cation was characterized by X-ray diffraction as being rectangular in geometry (194 pm Cl–Cl and 294 pm Cl···Cl), consisting of two Cl_{2} units bonded by π*–π* orbital interactions. Despite the long bond length between the two Cl_{2} units, dissociation to Cl_{2} + Cl^{+}_{2} was found to be endothermic by approximately 25 kcal/mol. It reacts with O_{2} to give a complex containing the [Cl_{2}O_{2}]^{+} cation.

=== Chlorine fluorides ===
The three fluorides of chlorine form a subset of the interhalogen compounds, all of which are diamagnetic. Some cationic and anionic derivatives are known, such as ClF_{2}^{−}, ClF_{4}^{−}, ClF_{2}^{+}, and Cl_{2}F^{+}. Some pseudohalides of chlorine are also known, such as cyanogen chloride (ClCN, linear), chlorine cyanate (ClNCO), chlorine thiocyanate (ClSCN, unlike its oxygen counterpart), and chlorine azide (ClN_{3}).

Chlorine monofluoride (ClF) is extremely thermally stable, and is sold commercially in 500-gram steel lecture bottles. It is a colourless gas that melts at −155.6 °C and boils at −100.1 °C. It may be produced by the reaction of its elements at 225 °C, though it must then be separated and purified from chlorine trifluoride and its reactants. Its properties are mostly intermediate between those of chlorine and fluorine. It will react with many metals and nonmetals from room temperature and above, fluorinating them and liberating chlorine. It will also act as a chlorofluorinating agent, adding chlorine and fluorine across a multiple bond or by oxidation: for example, it will attack carbon monoxide to form carbonyl chlorofluoride, COFCl. It will react analogously with hexafluoroacetone, (CF_{3})_{2}CO, with a potassium fluoride catalyst to produce heptafluoroisopropyl hypochlorite, (CF_{3})_{2}CFOCl; with nitriles RCN to produce RCF_{2}NCl_{2}; and with the sulfur oxides SO_{2} and SO_{3} to produce ClSO_{2}F and ClOSO_{2}F respectively. It will also react exothermically with compounds containing –OH and –NH groups, such as water:

H_{2}O + 2 ClF → 2 HF + Cl_{2}O

Chlorine trifluoride (ClF_{3}) is a volatile colourless molecular liquid which melts at −76.3 °C (196.8 K) and boils at 11.8 °C. It may be formed by directly fluorinating gaseous chlorine or chlorine monofluoride at 200–300 °C. One of the most reactive chemical compounds known, the list of elements it sets on fire is diverse, containing hydrogen, potassium, phosphorus, arsenic, antimony, sulfur, selenium, tellurium, bromine, iodine, and powdered molybdenum, tungsten, rhodium, iridium, and iron. It will also ignite water, along with many substances which in ordinary circumstances would be considered chemically inert such as asbestos, concrete, glass, and sand. When heated, it will even corrode noble metals as palladium, platinum, and gold, and even the noble gases xenon and radon do not escape fluorination. An impermeable fluoride layer is formed by sodium, magnesium, aluminium, zinc, tin, and silver, which may be removed by heating. Nickel, copper, and steel containers are usually used due to their great resistance to attack by chlorine trifluoride, stemming from the formation of an unreactive layer of metal fluoride. Its reaction with hydrazine to form hydrogen fluoride, nitrogen, and chlorine gases was used in experimental rocket engine, but has problems largely stemming from its extreme hypergolicity resulting in ignition without any measurable delay. Today, it is mostly used in nuclear fuel processing, to oxidise uranium to uranium hexafluoride for its enriching and to separate it from plutonium, as well as in the semiconductor industry, where it is used to clean chemical vapour deposition chambers. It can act as a fluoride ion donor or acceptor (Lewis base or acid), although it does not dissociate appreciably into ClF_{2}^{+} and ClF_{4}^{−} ions.

Chlorine pentafluoride (ClF_{5}) is made on a large scale by direct fluorination of chlorine with excess fluorine gas at 350 °C and 250 atm, and on a small scale by reacting metal chlorides with fluorine gas at 100–300 °C. It melts at −103 °C and boils at −13.1 °C. It is a very strong fluorinating agent, although it is still not as effective as chlorine trifluoride. Only a few specific stoichiometric reactions have been characterised. Arsenic pentafluoride and antimony pentafluoride form ionic adducts of the form [ClF_{4}]^{+}[MF_{6}]^{−} (M = As, Sb) and water reacts vigorously as follows:

2 H_{2}O + ClF_{5} → 4 HF + FClO_{2}

The product, chloryl fluoride, is one of the five known chlorine oxide fluorides. These range from the thermally unstable FClO to the chemically unreactive perchloryl fluoride (FClO_{3}), the other three being FClO_{2}, F_{3}ClO, and F_{3}ClO_{2}. All five behave similarly to the chlorine fluorides, both structurally and chemically, and may act as Lewis acids or bases by gaining or losing fluoride ions respectively or as very strong oxidising and fluorinating agents.

=== Chlorine oxides ===
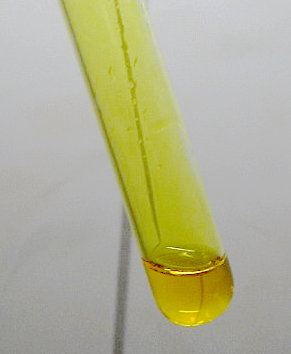
Yellow chlorine dioxide (ClO_{2}) gas above a solution of hydrochloric acid and sodium chlorite in water, also containing dissolved chlorine dioxide

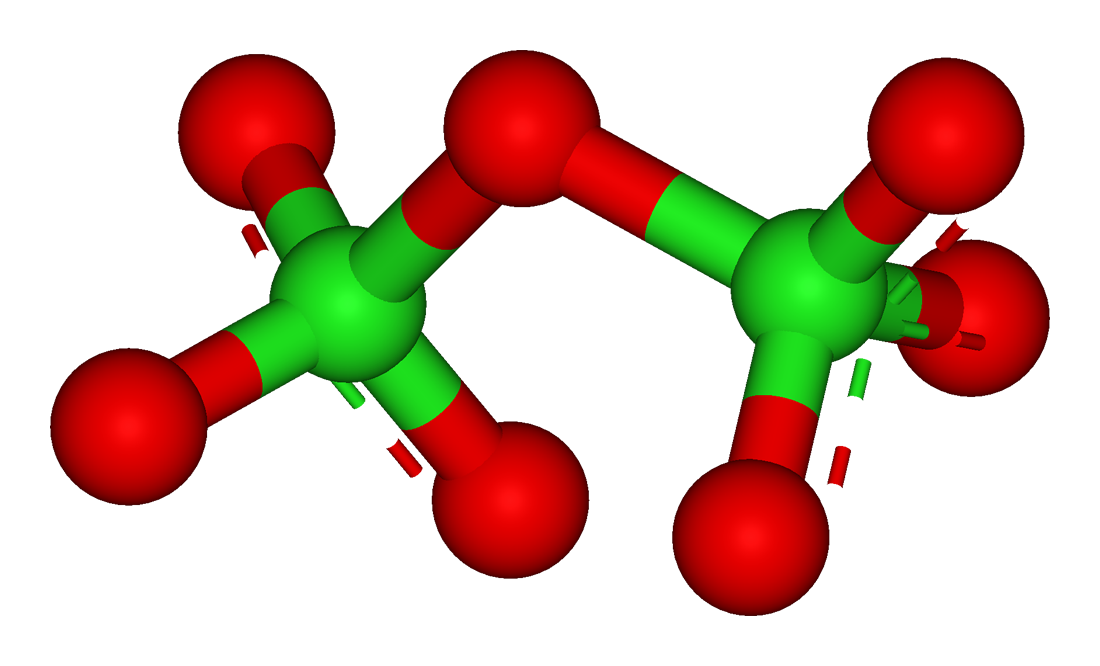
Structure of dichlorine heptoxide, Cl_{2}O_{7}, the most stable of the chlorine oxides

The chlorine oxides are well-studied in spite of their instability (all of them are endothermic compounds). They are important because they are produced when chlorofluorocarbons undergo photolysis in the upper atmosphere and cause the destruction of the ozone layer. None of them can be made from directly reacting the elements.

Dichlorine monoxide (Cl_{2}O) is a brownish-yellow gas (red-brown when solid or liquid) which may be obtained by reacting chlorine gas with yellow mercury(II) oxide. It is very soluble in water, in which it is in equilibrium with hypochlorous acid (HOCl), of which it is the anhydride. It is thus an effective bleach and is mostly used to make hypochlorites. It explodes on heating or sparking or in the presence of ammonia gas.

Chlorine dioxide (ClO_{2}) was the first chlorine oxide to be discovered in 1811 by Humphry Davy. It is a yellow paramagnetic gas (deep-red as a solid or liquid), as expected from its having an odd number of electrons: it is stable towards dimerisation due to the delocalisation of the unpaired electron. It explodes above −40 °C as a liquid and under pressure as a gas and therefore must be made at low concentrations for wood-pulp bleaching and water treatment. It is usually prepared by reducing a chlorate as follows:

2 ClO_{3}^{−} + 2 Cl^{−} + 4 H^{+} → 2 ClO_{2} + Cl_{2} + 2 H_{2}O

Its production is thus intimately linked to the redox reactions of the chlorine oxoacids. It is a strong oxidising agent, reacting with sulfur, phosphorus, phosphorus halides, and potassium borohydride. It dissolves exothermically in water to form dark-green solutions that very slowly decompose in the dark. Crystalline clathrate hydrates ClO_{2}·nH_{2}O (n ≈ 6–10) separate at low temperatures. However, in the presence of light, these solutions rapidly photodecompose to form a mixture of chloric and hydrochloric acids. Photolysis of individual ClO_{2} molecules result in the radicals ClO and ClOO, while at room temperature mostly chlorine, oxygen, and some ClO_{3} and Cl_{2}O_{6} are produced. Cl_{2}O_{3} is also produced when photolysing the solid at −78 °C: it is a dark brown solid that explodes below 0 °C. The ClO radical leads to the depletion of atmospheric ozone and is thus environmentally important as follows:

Cl• + O_{3} → ClO• + O_{2}
ClO• + O• → Cl• + O_{2}

Chlorine perchlorate (ClOClO_{3}) is a pale yellow liquid that is less stable than ClO_{2} and decomposes at room temperature to form chlorine, oxygen, and dichlorine hexoxide (Cl_{2}O_{6}). Chlorine perchlorate may also be considered a chlorine derivative of perchloric acid (HOClO_{3}), similar to the thermally unstable chlorine derivatives of other oxoacids: examples include chlorine nitrate (ClONO_{2}, vigorously reactive and explosive), and chlorine fluorosulfate (ClOSO_{2}F, more stable but still moisture-sensitive and highly reactive). Dichlorine hexoxide is a dark-red liquid that freezes to form a solid which turns yellow at −180 °C: it is usually made by reaction of chlorine dioxide with oxygen. Despite attempts to rationalise it as the dimer of ClO_{3}, it reacts more as though it were chloryl perchlorate, [ClO_{2}]^{+}[ClO_{4}]^{−}, which has been confirmed to be the correct structure of the solid. It hydrolyses in water to give a mixture of chloric and perchloric acids: the analogous reaction with anhydrous hydrogen fluoride does not proceed to completion.

Dichlorine heptoxide (Cl_{2}O_{7}) is the anhydride of perchloric acid (HClO_{4}) and can readily be obtained from it by dehydrating it with phosphoric acid at −10 °C and then distilling the product at −35 °C and 1 mmHg. It is a shock-sensitive, colourless oily liquid. It is the least reactive of the chlorine oxides, being the only one to not set organic materials on fire at room temperature. It may be dissolved in water to regenerate perchloric acid or in aqueous alkalis to regenerate perchlorates. However, it thermally decomposes explosively by breaking one of the central Cl–O bonds, producing the radicals ClO_{3} and ClO_{4} which immediately decompose to the elements through intermediate oxides.

=== Chlorine oxoacids and oxyanions ===
Standard reduction potentials for aqueous Cl species
E°(couple)	a(H^{+}) = 1 (acid)	E°(couple)	a(OH^{–}) = 1 (base)
Cl_{2}/Cl^{−}	+1.358	Cl_{2}/Cl^{−}	+1.358
HOCl/Cl^{−}	+1.484	ClO^{−}/Cl^{−}	+0.890
ClO_{3}^{−}/Cl^{−}	+1.459		
HOCl/Cl_{2}	+1.630	ClO^{−}/Cl_{2}	+0.421
HClO_{2}/Cl_{2}	+1.659		
ClO_{3}^{−}/Cl_{2}	+1.468		
ClO_{4}^{−}/Cl_{2}	+1.277		
HClO_{2}/HOCl	+1.701	ClO_{2}^{−}/ClO^{−}	+0.681
		ClO_{3}^{−}/ClO^{−}	+0.488
ClO_{3}^{−}/HClO_{2}>	+1.181	ClO_{2}^{−}/ClO_{2}^{−}	+0.295
ClO_{4}^{−}/ClO_{3}^{−}	+1.201	ClO_{4}^{−}/ClO_{3}^{−}	+0.374

Chlorine forms four oxoacids: hypochlorous acid (HOCl), chlorous acid (HOClO), chloric acid (HOClO_{2}), and perchloric acid (HOClO_{3}). As can be seen from the redox potentials given in the adjacent table, chlorine is much more stable towards disproportionation in acidic solutions than in alkaline solutions:

Cl_{2} + H_{2}O ⇌ HOCl + H^{+} + Cl^{−} K_{ac} = 4.2×10^{−4} mol^{2} dm^{−6}
Cl_{2} + 2 OH^{−} ⇌ OCl^{−} + H_{2}O + Cl^{−} K_{alk} = 7.5×10^{15} mol^{−1} dm^{3}

The hypochlorite ions also disproportionate further to produce chloride and chlorate (3 ClO^{−} ⇌ 2 Cl^{−} + ClO_{3}^{−}) but this reaction is quite slow at temperatures below 70 °C in spite of the very favourable equilibrium constant of 10^{27}. The chlorate ions may themselves disproportionate to form chloride and perchlorate (4 ClO_{3}^{−} ⇌ Cl^{−} + 3 ClO_{4}^{−}) but this is still very slow even at 100 °C despite the very favourable equilibrium constant of 10^{20}. The rates of reaction for the chlorine oxyanions increases as the oxidation state of chlorine decreases. The strengths of the chlorine oxyacids increase very quickly as the oxidation state of chlorine increases due to the increasing delocalisation of charge over more and more oxygen atoms in their conjugate bases.

Most of the chlorine oxoacids may be produced by exploiting these disproportionation reactions. Hypochlorous acid (HOCl) is highly reactive and quite unstable; its salts are mostly used for their bleaching and sterilising abilities. They are very strong oxidising agents, transferring an oxygen atom to most inorganic species. Chlorous acid (HOClO) is even more unstable and cannot be isolated or concentrated without decomposition: it is known from the decomposition of aqueous chlorine dioxide. However, sodium chlorite is a stable salt and is useful for bleaching and stripping textiles, as an oxidising agent, and as a source of chlorine dioxide. Chloric acid (HOClO_{2}) is a strong acid that is quite stable in cold water up to 30% concentration, but on warming gives chlorine and chlorine dioxide. Evaporation under reduced pressure allows it to be concentrated further to about 40%, but then it decomposes to perchloric acid, chlorine, oxygen, water, and chlorine dioxide. Its most important salt is sodium chlorate, mostly used to make chlorine dioxide to bleach paper pulp. The decomposition of chlorate to chloride and oxygen is a common way to produce oxygen in the laboratory on a small scale. Chloride and chlorate may comproportionate to form chlorine as follows:

ClO_{3}^{−} + 5 Cl^{−} + 6 H^{+} → 3 Cl_{2} + 3 H_{2}O

Perchlorates and perchloric acid (HOClO_{3}) are the most stable oxo-compounds of chlorine, in keeping with the fact that chlorine compounds are most stable when the chlorine atom is in its lowest (−1) or highest (+7) possible oxidation states. Perchloric acid and aqueous perchlorates are vigorous and sometimes violent oxidising agents when heated, in stark contrast to their mostly inactive nature at room temperature due to the high activation energies for these reactions for kinetic reasons. Perchlorates are made by electrolytically oxidising sodium chlorate, and perchloric acid is made by reacting anhydrous sodium perchlorate or barium perchlorate with concentrated hydrochloric acid, filtering away the chloride precipitated and distilling the filtrate to concentrate it. Anhydrous perchloric acid is a colourless mobile liquid that is sensitive to shock that explodes on contact with most organic compounds, sets hydrogen iodide and thionyl chloride on fire and even oxidises silver and gold. Although it is a weak ligand, weaker than water, a few compounds involving coordinated ClO_{4}^{−} are known. The Table below presents typical oxidation states for chlorine element as given in the secondary schools or colleges. There are more complex chemical compounds, the structure of which can only be explained using modern quantum chemical methods, for example, cluster technetium chloride [(CH_{3})_{4}N]_{3}[Tc_{6}Cl_{14}], in which 6 of the 14 chlorine atoms are formally divalent, and oxidation states are fractional. In addition, all the above chemical regularities are valid for "normal" or close to normal conditions, while at ultra-high pressures (for example, in the cores of large planets), chlorine can form a Na_{3}Cl compound with sodium, which does not fit into traditional concepts of chemistry.

Chlorine oxidation state	−1	+1	+3	+5	+7
Name	chloride	hypochlorite	chlorite	chlorate	perchlorate
Formula	Cl^{−}	ClO^{−}	ClO_{2}^{−}	ClO_{3}^{−}	ClO_{4}^{−}
Structure	The chloride ion	The hypochlorite ion	The chlorite ion	The chlorate ion	The perchlorate ion

=== Organochlorine compounds ===
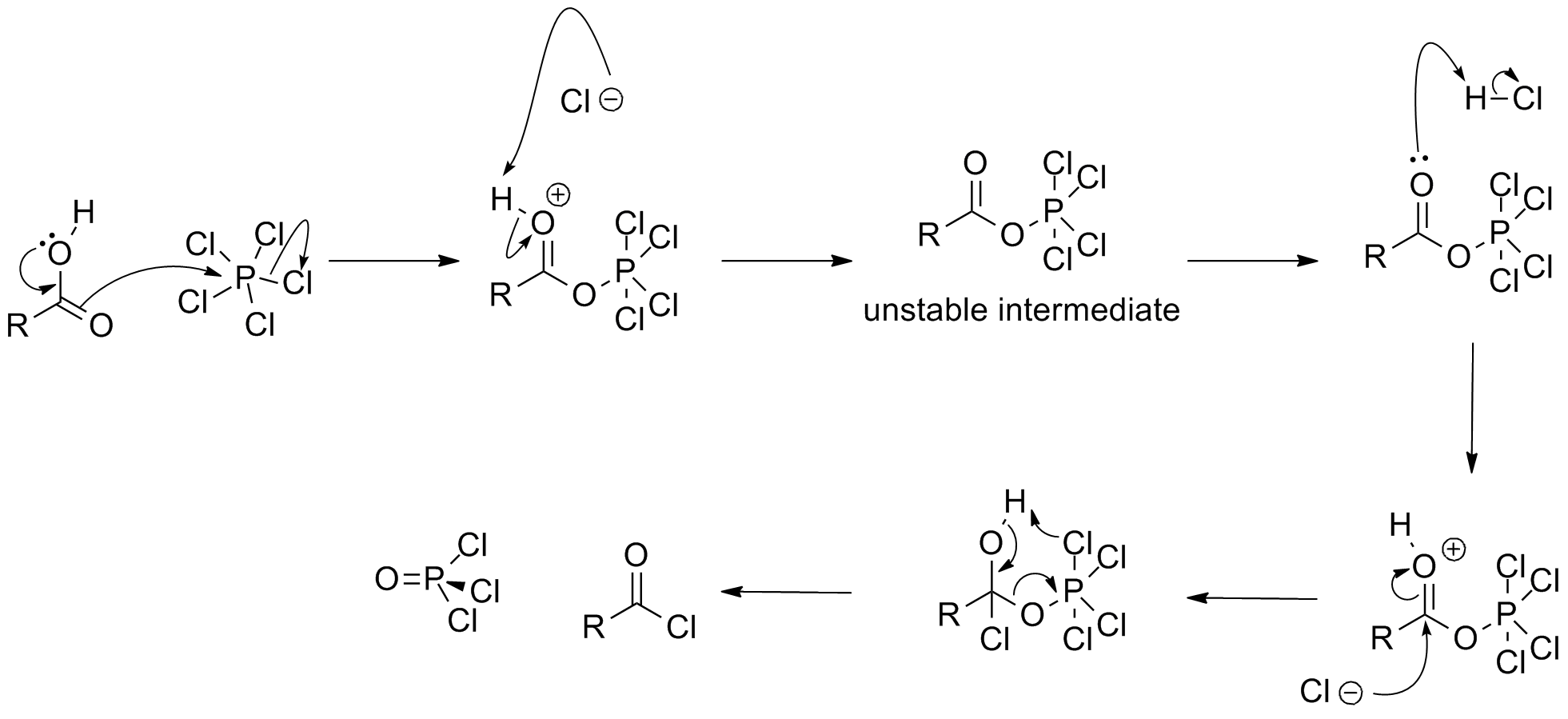
Suggested mechanism for the chlorination of a carboxylic acid by phosphorus pentachloride to form an acyl chloride

Like the other carbon–halogen bonds, the C–Cl bond is a common functional group that forms part of core organic chemistry. Formally, compounds with this functional group may be considered organic derivatives of the chloride anion. Due to the difference of electronegativity between chlorine (3.16) and carbon (2.55), the carbon in a C–Cl bond is electron-deficient and thus electrophilic. Chlorination modifies the physical properties of hydrocarbons in several ways: chlorocarbons are typically denser than water due to the higher atomic weight of chlorine versus hydrogen, and aliphatic organochlorides are alkylating agents because chloride is a leaving group.

Alkanes and aryl alkanes may be chlorinated under free-radical conditions, with UV light. However, the extent of chlorination is difficult to control: the reaction is not regioselective and often results in a mixture of various isomers with different degrees of chlorination, though this may be permissible if the products are easily separated. Aryl chlorides may be prepared by the Friedel-Crafts halogenation, using chlorine and a Lewis acid catalyst. The haloform reaction, using chlorine and sodium hydroxide, is also able to generate alkyl halides from methyl ketones, and related compounds. Chlorine adds to the multiple bonds on alkenes and alkynes as well, giving di- or tetrachloro compounds. However, due to the expense and reactivity of chlorine, organochlorine compounds are more commonly produced by using hydrogen chloride, or with chlorinating agents such as phosphorus pentachloride (PCl_{5}) or thionyl chloride (SOCl_{2}). The last is very convenient in the laboratory because all side products are gaseous and do not have to be distilled out.

Many organochlorine compounds have been isolated from natural sources ranging from bacteria to humans. Chlorinated organic compounds are found in nearly every class of biomolecules including alkaloids, terpenes, amino acids, flavonoids, steroids, and fatty acids. Organochlorides, including dioxins, are produced in the high temperature environment of forest fires, and dioxins have been found in the preserved ashes of lightning-ignited fires that predate synthetic dioxins. In addition, a variety of simple chlorinated hydrocarbons including dichloromethane, chloroform, and carbon tetrachloride have been isolated from marine algae. A majority of the chloromethane in the environment is produced naturally by biological decomposition, forest fires, and volcanoes.

Some types of organochlorides, though not all, have significant toxicity to plants or animals, including humans. Dioxins, produced when organic matter is burned in the presence of chlorine, and some insecticides, such as DDT, are persistent organic pollutants which pose dangers when they are released into the environment. For example, DDT, which was widely used to control insects in the mid 20th century, also accumulates in food chains, and causes reproductive problems (e.g., eggshell thinning) in certain bird species. Due to the ready homolytic fission of the C–Cl bond to create chlorine radicals in the upper atmosphere, chlorofluorocarbons have been discontinued due to the harm they do to the ozone layer.

== Occurrence ==
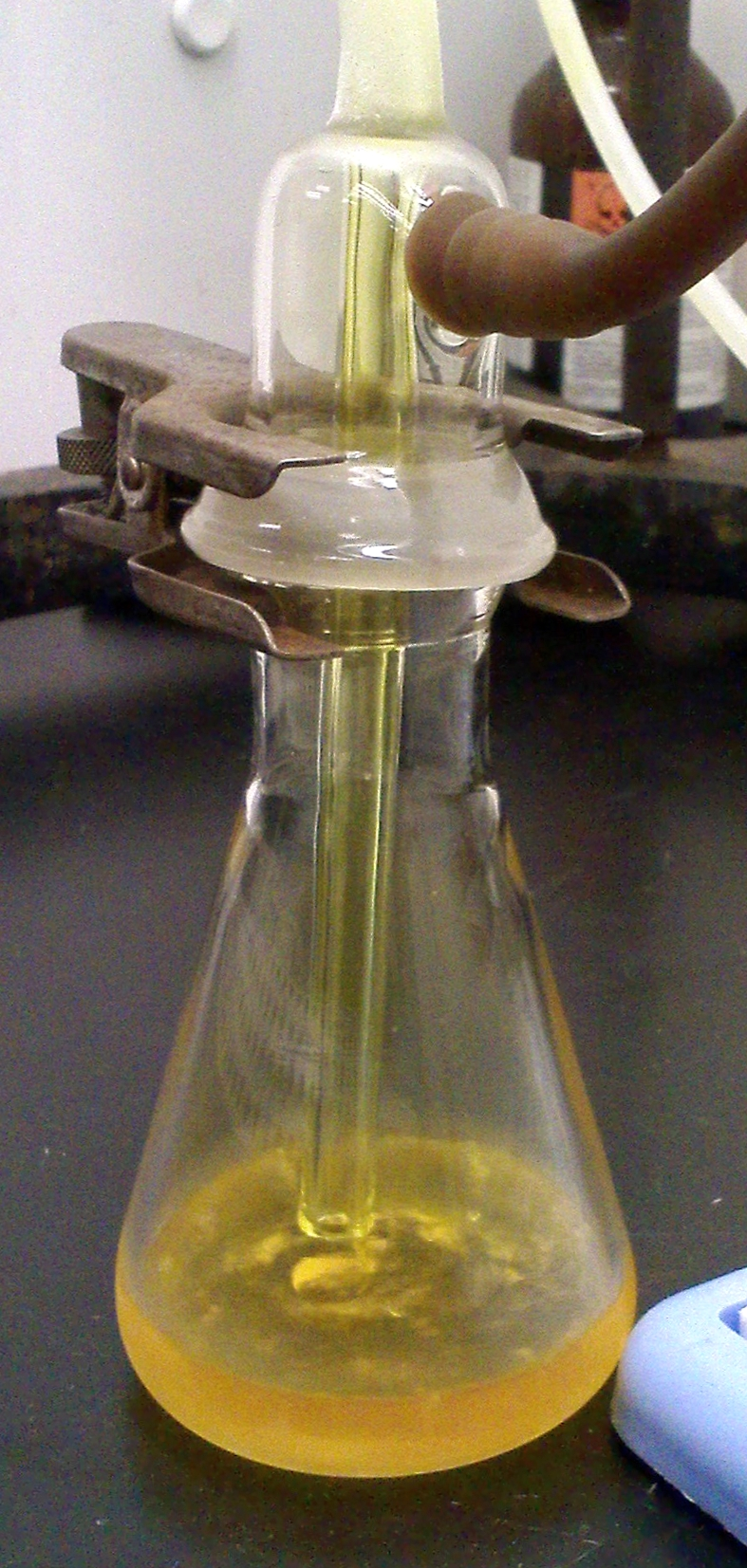
Liquid chlorine analysis

Chlorine is too reactive to occur as the free element in nature but is very abundant in the form of its chloride salts. It is the 20th most abundant element in Earth's crust and makes up 126 parts per million of it, through the large deposits of chloride minerals, especially sodium chloride, that have been evaporated from water bodies. All of these pale in comparison to the reserves of chloride ions in seawater: smaller amounts at higher concentrations occur in some inland seas and underground brine wells, such as the Great Salt Lake in Utah and the Dead Sea in Israel.

Small batches of chlorine gas are prepared in the laboratory by combining hydrochloric acid and manganese dioxide, but the need rarely arises due to its ready availability. In industry, elemental chlorine is usually produced by the electrolysis of sodium chloride dissolved in water. This method, the chloralkali process industrialised in 1892, now provides most industrial chlorine gas. Along with chlorine, the method yields hydrogen gas and sodium hydroxide, which is the most valuable product. The process proceeds according to the following chemical equation:

2 NaCl + 2 H_{2}O → Cl_{2} + H_{2} + 2 NaOH

== Production ==
Chlorine is primarily produced by the chloralkali process, although non-chloralkali processes exist. Global 2022 production was estimated to be 97 million tonnes. The most visible use of chlorine is in water disinfection. 35–40 % of chlorine produced is used to make poly(vinyl chloride) through ethylene dichloride and vinyl chloride. The chlorine produced is available in cylinders from sizes ranging from 450 g to 70 kg, as well as drums (865 kg), tank wagons (15 tonnes on roads; 27–90 tonnes by rail), and barges (600–1200 tonnes). Due to the difficulty and hazards in transporting elemental chlorine, production is typically located near where it is consumed. As examples, vinyl chloride producers such as Westlake Chemical and Formosa Plastics have integrated chloralkali assets.

=== Chloralkali processes ===
The electrolysis of chloride solutions all proceed according to the following equations:

Cathode: 2 H_{2}O + 2 e^{−} → H_{2} + 2 OH^{−}
Anode: 2 Cl^{−} → Cl_{2} + 2 e^{−}

In the conventional case where sodium chloride is electrolysed, sodium hydroxide and chlorine are coproducts.

Industrially, there are three chloralkali processes:

- The Castner–Kellner process that utilises a mercury electrode
- The diaphragm cell process that utilises an asbestos diaphragm that separates the cathode and anode
- The membrane cell process that uses an ion exchange membrane in place of the diaphragm

The Castner–Kellner process was the first method used at the end of the nineteenth century to produce chlorine on an industrial scale. Mercury (that is toxic) was used as an electrode to amalgamate the sodium product, preventing undesirable side reactions.

In diaphragm cell electrolysis, an asbestos (or polymer-fibre) diaphragm separates a cathode and an anode, preventing the chlorine forming at the anode from re-mixing with the sodium hydroxide and the hydrogen formed at the cathode. The salt solution (brine) is continuously fed to the anode compartment and flows through the diaphragm to the cathode compartment, where the caustic alkali is produced and the brine is partially depleted. Diaphragm methods produce dilute and slightly impure alkali, but they are not burdened with the problem of mercury disposal and they are more energy efficient.

Membrane cell electrolysis employs permeable membrane as an ion exchanger. Saturated sodium (or potassium) chloride solution is passed through the anode compartment, leaving at a lower concentration. This method also produces very pure sodium (or potassium) hydroxide but has the disadvantage of requiring very pure brine at high concentrations. However, due to the lower energy requirements of the membrane process, new chlor-alkali installations are now almost exclusively employing the membrane process. Next to this, the use of large volumes of mercury is considered undesirable. Also, older plants are converted into the membrane process.

Membrane cell process for chloralkali production

=== Non-chloralkali processes ===
In the Deacon process, hydrogen chloride recovered from the production of organochlorine compounds is recovered as chlorine. The process relies on oxidation using oxygen:

4 HCl + O_{2} → 2 Cl_{2} + 2 H_{2}O

The reaction requires a catalyst. As introduced by Deacon, early catalysts were based on copper. Commercial processes, such as the Mitsui MT-Chlorine Process, have switched to chromium and ruthenium-based catalysts.

== Applications ==
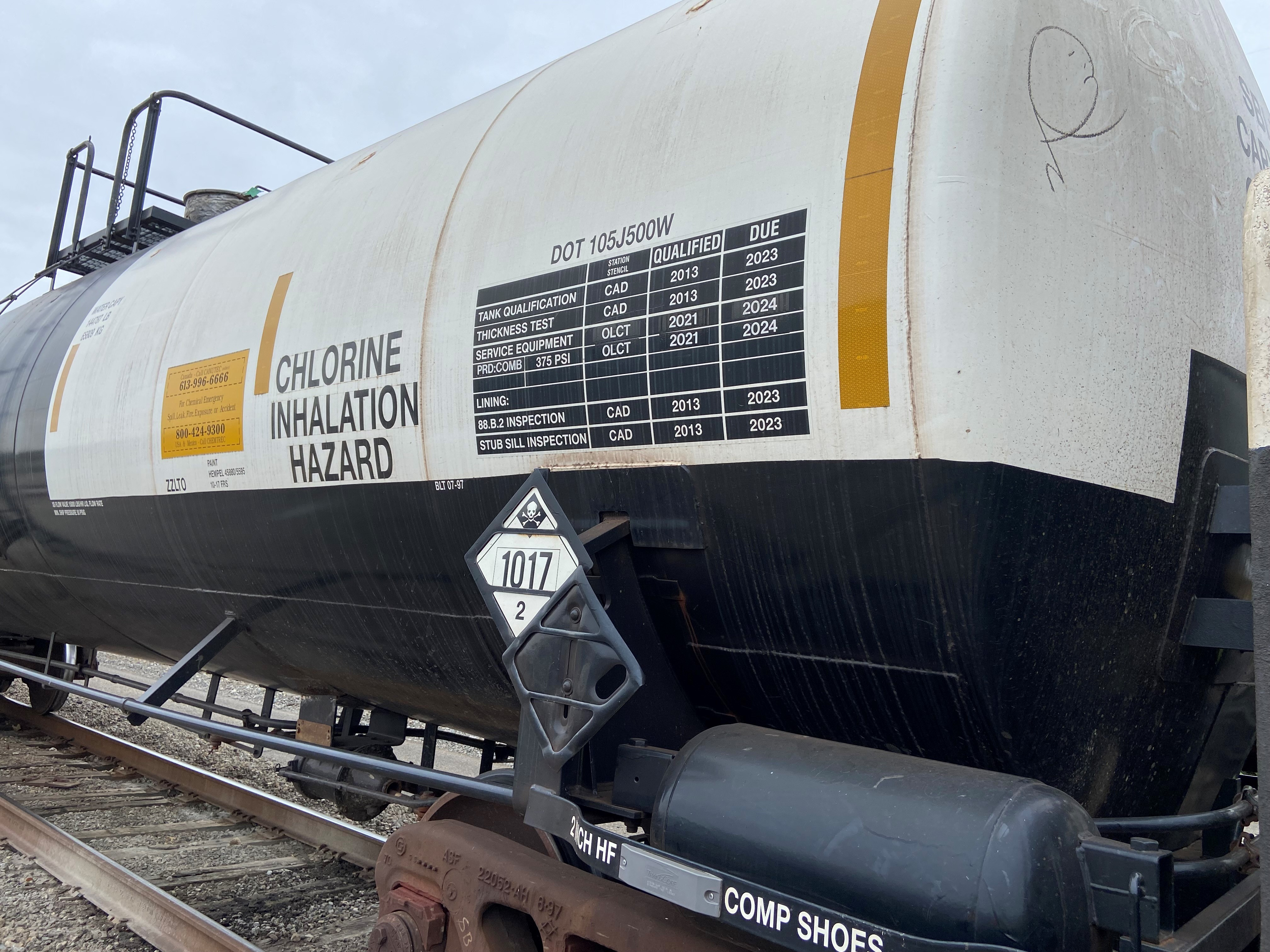
A railway tank car carrying chlorine, displaying hazardous materials information including a diamond-shaped U.S. DOT placard showing a UN number

Sodium chloride is the most common chlorine compound, and is the main source of chlorine for the demand by the chemical industry. About 15000 chlorine-containing compounds are commercially traded, including such diverse compounds as chlorinated methane, ethanes, vinyl chloride, polyvinyl chloride (PVC), aluminium trichloride for catalysis, the chlorides of magnesium, titanium, zirconium, and hafnium which are the precursors for producing the pure form of those elements.

Quantitatively, of all elemental chlorine produced, about 63% is used in the manufacture of organic compounds, and 18% in the manufacture of inorganic chlorine compounds. About 15,000 chlorine compounds are used commercially. The remaining 19% of chlorine produced is used for bleaches and disinfection products. The most significant of organic compounds in terms of production volume are 1,2-dichloroethane and vinyl chloride, intermediates in the production of PVC. Other particularly important organochlorines are methyl chloride, methylene chloride, chloroform, vinylidene chloride, trichloroethylene, perchloroethylene, allyl chloride, epichlorohydrin, chlorobenzene, dichlorobenzenes, and trichlorobenzenes. The major inorganic compounds include HCl, Cl_{2}O, HOCl, NaClO_{3}, AlCl_{3}, SiCl_{4}, SnCl_{4}, PCl_{3}, PCl_{5}, POCl_{3}, AsCl_{3}, SbCl_{3}, SbCl_{5}, BiCl_{3}, and ZnCl_{2}.

=== Sanitation, disinfection, and antisepsis ===
==== Combating putrefaction ====
In France (as elsewhere), animal intestines were processed to make musical instrument strings, Goldbeater's skin and other products. This was done in "gut factories" (boyauderies), and it was an odiferous and unhealthy process. In or about 1820, the Société d'encouragement pour l'industrie nationale offered a prize for the discovery of a method, chemical or mechanical, for separating the peritoneal membrane of animal intestines without putrefaction. The prize was won by Antoine-Germain Labarraque, a 44-year-old French chemist and pharmacist who had discovered that Berthollet's chlorinated bleaching solutions ("Eau de Javel") not only destroyed the smell of putrefaction of animal tissue decomposition, but also actually retarded the decomposition.

Labarraque's research resulted in the use of chlorides and hypochlorites of lime (calcium hypochlorite) and of sodium (sodium hypochlorite) in the boyauderies. The same chemicals were found to be useful in the routine disinfection and deodorisation of latrines, sewers, markets, abattoirs, anatomical theatres, and morgues. They were successful in hospitals, lazarets, prisons, infirmaries (both on land and at sea), magnaneries, stables, cattle-sheds, etc.; and they were beneficial during exhumations, embalming, outbreaks of epidemic disease, fever, and blackleg in cattle.

==== Disinfection ====
Labarraque's chlorinated lime and soda solutions have been advocated since 1828 to prevent infection (called "contagious infection", presumed to be transmitted by "miasmas"), and to treat putrefaction of existing wounds, including septic wounds. In his 1828 work, Labarraque recommended that doctors breathe chlorine, wash their hands in chlorinated lime, and even sprinkle chlorinated lime about the patients' beds in cases of "contagious infection". In 1828, the contagion of infections was well known, even though the agency of the microbe was not discovered until more than half a century later.

During the Paris cholera outbreak of 1832, large quantities of so-called chloride of lime were used to disinfect the capital. This was not simply modern calcium chloride, but chlorine gas dissolved in lime-water (dilute calcium hydroxide) to form calcium hypochlorite (chlorinated lime). Labarraque's discovery helped to remove the terrible stench of decay from hospitals and dissecting rooms, and by doing so, effectively deodorised the Latin Quarter of Paris. These "putrid miasmas" were thought by many to cause the spread of "contagion" and "infection" – both words used before the germ theory of infection. Chloride of lime was used for destroying odors and "putrid matter". One source claims chloride of lime was used by Dr. John Snow to disinfect water from the cholera-contaminated well that was feeding the Broad Street pump in 1854 London, though three other reputable sources that describe that famous cholera epidemic do not mention the incident. One reference makes it clear that chloride of lime was used to disinfect the offal and filth in the streets surrounding the Broad Street pump – a common practice in mid-nineteenth century England.

==== Semmelweis and experiments with antisepsis ====
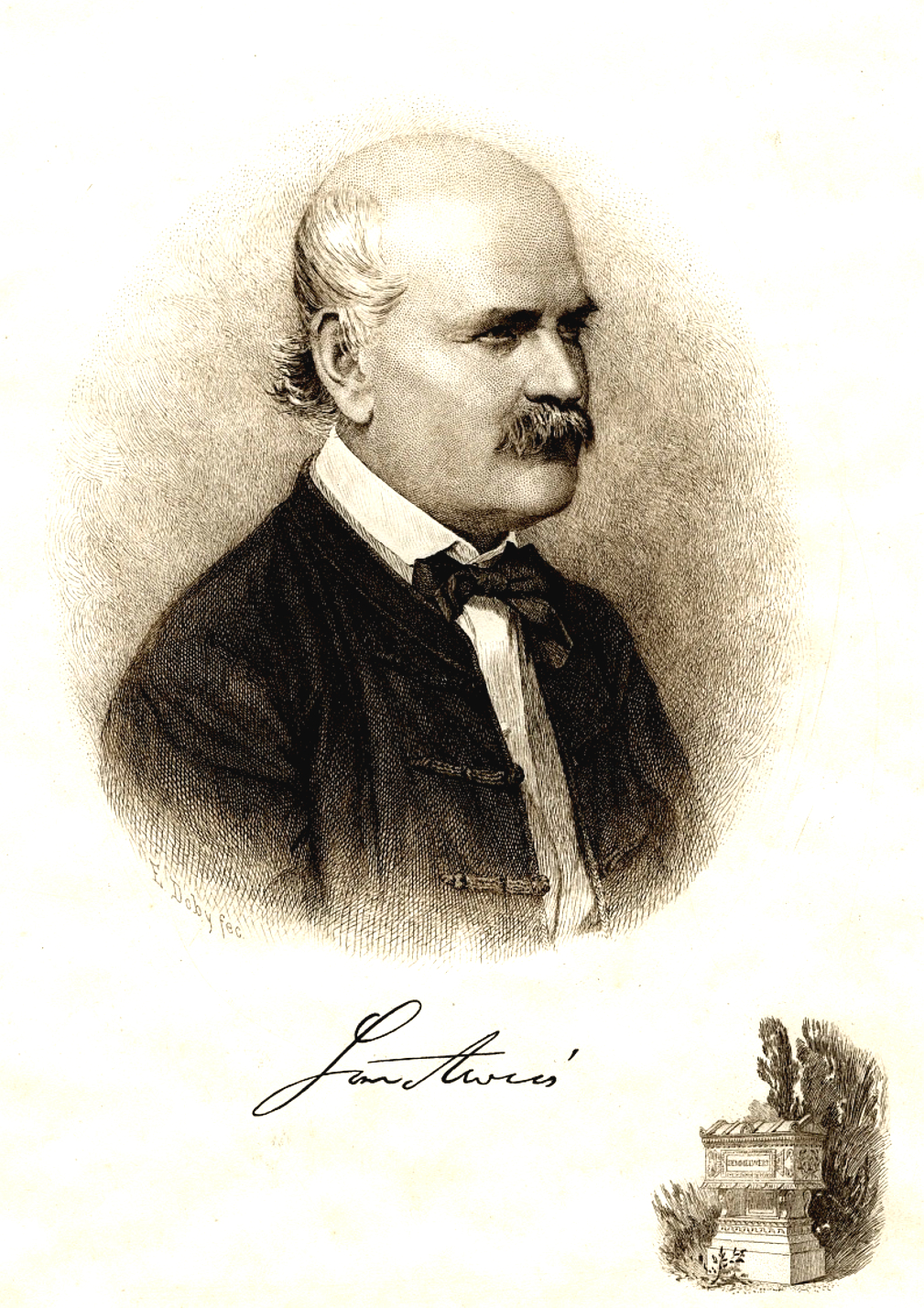
Ignaz Semmelweis

Perhaps the most famous application of Labarraque's chlorine and chemical base solutions was in 1847, when Ignaz Semmelweis used chlorine-water (chlorine dissolved in pure water, which was cheaper than chlorinated lime solutions) to disinfect the hands of Austrian doctors, which Semmelweis noticed still carried the stench of decomposition from the dissection rooms to the patient examination rooms. Long before the germ theory of disease, Semmelweis theorised that "cadaveric particles" were transmitting decay from fresh medical cadavers to living patients, and he used the well-known "Labarraque's solutions" as the only known method to remove the smell of decay and tissue decomposition (which he found that soap did not). The solutions proved to be far more effective antiseptics than soap (Semmelweis was also aware of their greater efficacy, but not the reason), and this resulted in Semmelweis's celebrated success in stopping the transmission of childbed fever ("puerperal fever") in the maternity wards of Vienna General Hospital in Austria in 1847.

Much later, during World War I in 1916, a standardised and diluted modification of Labarraque's solution containing hypochlorite (0.5%) and boric acid as an acidic stabiliser was developed by Henry Drysdale Dakin (who gave full credit to Labarraque's prior work in this area). Called Dakin's solution, the method of wound irrigation with chlorinated solutions allowed antiseptic treatment of a wide variety of open wounds, long before the modern antibiotic era. A modified version of this solution continues to be employed in wound irrigation in modern times, where it remains effective against bacteria that are resistant to multiple antibiotics.

==== Public sanitation ====
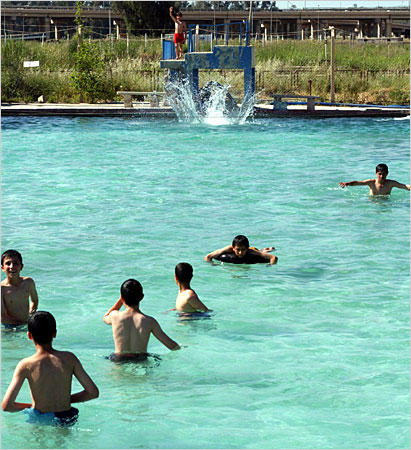
Chlorinated water is used in swimming pools to disinfect water from microbial contaminants.

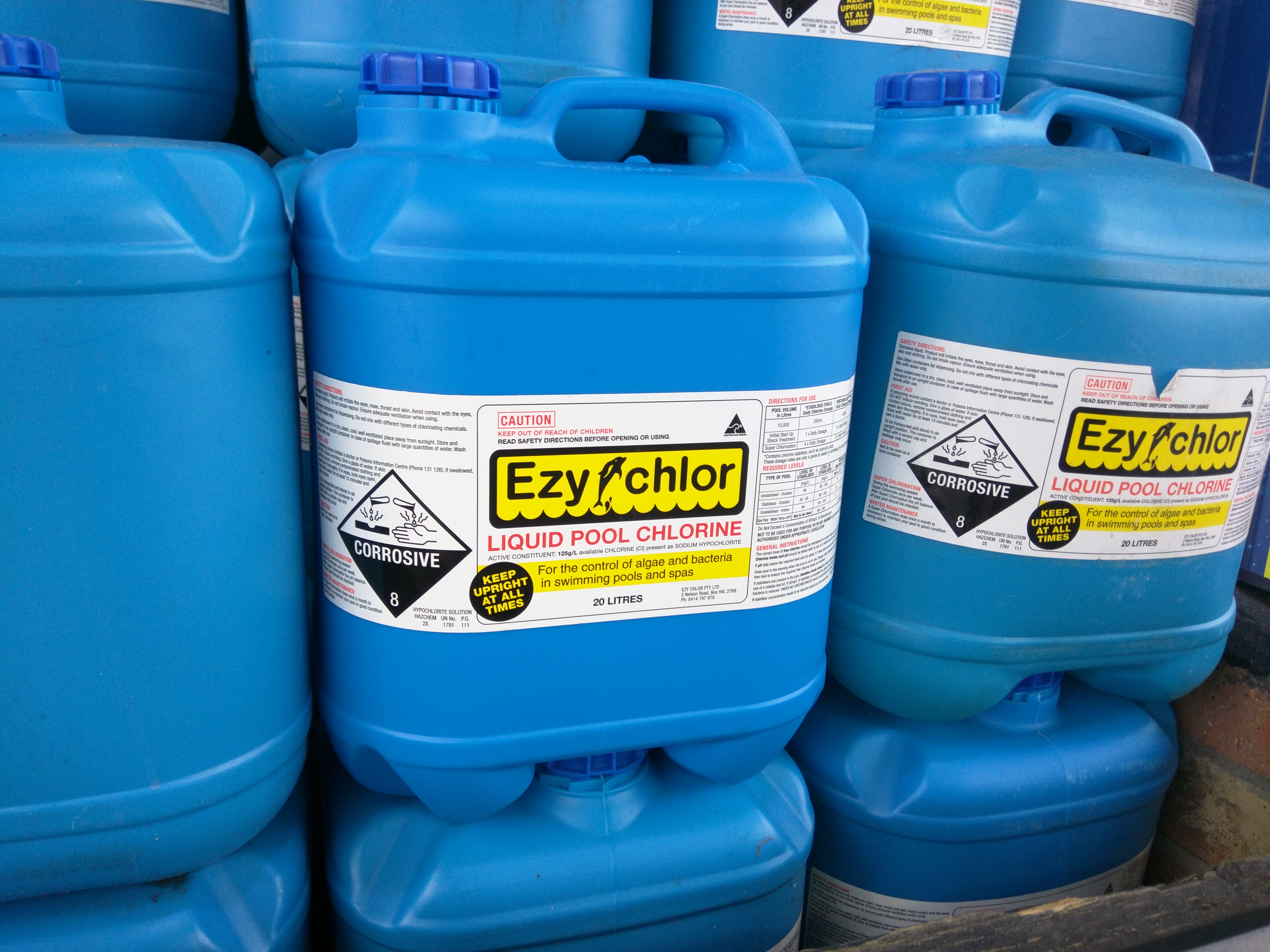
Liquid pool chlorine

The first continuous application of chlorination to drinking U.S. water was installed in Jersey City, New Jersey, in 1908. By 1918, the US Department of Treasury called for all drinking water to be disinfected with chlorine. Chlorine is presently an important chemical for water purification (such as in water treatment plants), in disinfectants, and in bleach. Even small water supplies are now routinely chlorinated.

Chlorine is usually used (in the form of hypochlorous acid) to kill bacteria and other microbes in drinking water supplies and public swimming pools. In most private swimming pools, chlorine itself is not used, but rather sodium hypochlorite, formed from chlorine and sodium hydroxide, or solid tablets of chlorinated isocyanurates. The drawback of using chlorine in swimming pools is that the chlorine reacts with the amino acids in proteins in human hair and skin. Contrary to popular belief, the distinctive "chlorine aroma" associated with swimming pools is not the result of elemental chlorine itself, but of chloramine, a chemical compound produced by the reaction of free dissolved chlorine with amines in organic substances including those in urine and sweat. As a disinfectant in water, chlorine is more than three times as effective against Escherichia coli as bromine, and more than six times as effective as iodine. Increasingly, monochloramine itself is being directly added to drinking water for purposes of disinfection, a process known as chloramination.

It is often impractical to store and use poisonous chlorine gas for water treatment, so alternative methods of adding chlorine are used. These include hypochlorite solutions, which gradually release chlorine into the water, and compounds like sodium dichloro-s-triazinetrione (dihydrate or anhydrous), sometimes referred to as "dichlor", and trichloro-s-triazinetrione, sometimes referred to as "trichlor". These compounds are stable while solid and may be used in powdered, granular, or tablet form. When added in small amounts to pool water or industrial water systems, the chlorine atoms hydrolyse from the rest of the molecule, forming hypochlorous acid (HOCl), which acts as a general biocide, killing germs, microorganisms, algae, and so on.

=== Use as a weapon ===
==== World War I ====
Chlorine gas, also known as bertholite, was first used as a weapon in World War I by Germany on 22 April 1915, in the Second Battle of Ypres. As described by the soldiers, it had the distinctive smell of a mixture of pepper and pineapple. It also tasted metallic and stung the back of the throat and chest. Chlorine reacts with water in the mucosa of the lungs to form hydrochloric acid, destructive to living tissue and potentially lethal. Human respiratory systems can be protected from chlorine gas by gas masks with activated charcoal or other filters, which makes chlorine gas much less lethal than other chemical weapons. It was pioneered by a German scientist later to be a Nobel laureate, Fritz Haber of the Kaiser Wilhelm Institute in Berlin, in collaboration with the German chemical conglomerate IG Farben, which developed methods for discharging chlorine gas against an entrenched enemy. After its first use, both sides in the conflict used chlorine as a chemical weapon, but it was soon replaced by the more deadly phosgene and more debilitating mustard gas.

==== Middle East ====
Chlorine gas was also used during the Iraq War in Anbar Province in 2007, with insurgents packing truck bombs with mortar shells and chlorine tanks. The attacks killed two people from the explosives and sickened more than 350. Most of the deaths were caused by the force of the explosions rather than the effects of chlorine since the toxic gas is readily dispersed and diluted in the atmosphere by the blast. In some bombings, over a hundred civilians were hospitalised due to breathing difficulties. The Iraqi authorities tightened security for elemental chlorine, which is essential for providing safe drinking water to the population.

On 23 October 2014, it was reported that the Islamic State of Iraq and the Levant had used chlorine gas in the town of Duluiyah, Iraq. Laboratory analysis of clothing and soil samples confirmed the use of chlorine gas against Kurdish Peshmerga Forces in a vehicle-borne improvised explosive device attack on 23 January 2015 at the Highway 47 Kiske Junction near Mosul.

Another country in the Middle East, Syria, has used chlorine as a chemical weapon delivered from barrel bombs and rockets. In 2016, the OPCW-UN Joint Investigative Mechanism concluded that the Syrian government used chlorine as a chemical weapon in three separate attacks. Later investigations from the OPCW's Investigation and Identification Team concluded that the Syrian Air Force was responsible for chlorine attacks in 2017 and 2018.

== Biological role ==
The chloride anion is an essential nutrient for metabolism. Chlorine is needed for the production of hydrochloric acid in the stomach and in cellular pump functions. The main dietary source is table salt, or sodium chloride. Overly low or high concentrations of chloride in the blood are examples of electrolyte disturbances. Hypochloremia (having too little chloride) rarely occurs in the absence of other abnormalities. It is sometimes associated with hypoventilation. It can be associated with chronic respiratory acidosis. Hyperchloremia (having too much chloride) usually does not produce symptoms. When symptoms do occur, they tend to resemble those of hypernatremia (having too much sodium). Reduction in blood chloride leads to cerebral dehydration; symptoms are most often caused by rapid rehydration which results in cerebral edema. Hyperchloremia can affect oxygen transport.

== Hazards ==
Chlorine
Hazards
- GHS labelling
Pictograms	(GHS03: Oxidizing) (GHS06: Toxic) (GHS09: Environmental hazard)
Signal word	Danger
Hazard statements	H270, H315, H319, H330, H335, H400
Precautionary statements	P220, P233, P244, P261, P304, P312, P340, P403, P410
NFPA 704 (fire diamond)	4 0 0 OX

Chlorine is a toxic gas that attacks the respiratory system, eyes, and skin. Because it is denser than air, it tends to accumulate at the bottom of poorly ventilated spaces. Chlorine gas is a strong oxidiser, which may react with flammable materials.

Chlorine is detectable with measuring devices in concentrations as low as 0.2 parts per million (ppm), and by smell at 3 ppm. Coughing and vomiting may occur at 30 ppm and lung damage at 60 ppm. About 1000 ppm can be fatal after a few deep breaths of the gas. The IDLH (immediately dangerous to life and health) concentration is 10 ppm. Breathing lower concentrations can aggravate the respiratory system and exposure to the gas can irritate the eyes. When chlorine is inhaled at concentrations greater than 30 ppm, it reacts with water within the lungs, producing hydrochloric acid (HCl) and hypochlorous acid (HOCl).

When used at specified levels for water disinfection, the reaction of chlorine with water is not a major concern for human health. Other materials present in the water may generate disinfection by-products that are associated with negative effects on human health.

In the United States, the Occupational Safety and Health Administration (OSHA) has set the permissible exposure limit for elemental chlorine at 1 ppm, or 3 mg/m^{3}. The National Institute for Occupational Safety and Health has designated a recommended exposure limit of 0.5 ppm over 15 minutes.

In the home, accidents occur when hypochlorite bleach solutions come into contact with certain acidic drain-cleaners to produce chlorine gas. Hypochlorite bleach (a popular laundry additive) combined with ammonia (another popular laundry additive) produces chloramines, another toxic group of chemicals.

=== Chlorine-induced cracking in structural materials ===
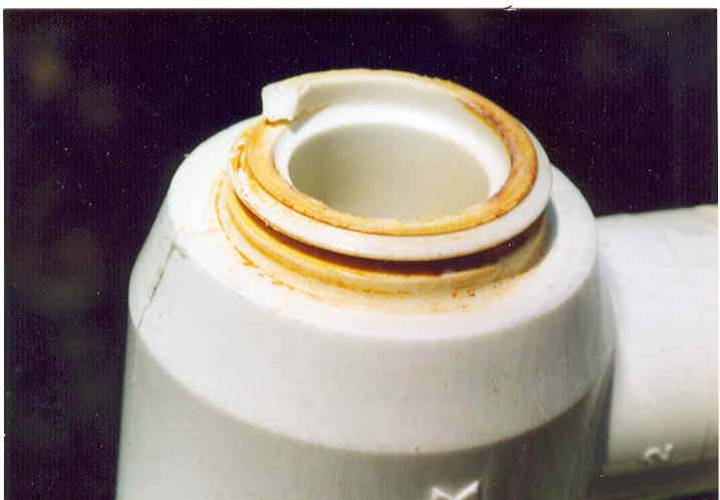
Chlorine "attack" on an acetal resin plumbing joint resulting from a fractured acetal joint in a water supply system which started at an injection moulding defect in the joint and slowly grew until the part failed. The fracture surface shows iron and calcium salts that were deposited in the leaking joint from the water supply before failure and are the indirect result of the chlorine attack.

Chlorine is widely used for purifying water, especially potable water supplies and water used in swimming pools. Several catastrophic collapses of swimming pool ceilings have occurred from chlorine-induced stress corrosion cracking of stainless steel suspension rods. Some polymers are also sensitive to attack, including acetal resin and polybutene. Both materials were used in hot and cold water domestic plumbing, and stress corrosion cracking caused widespread failures in the US in the 1980s and 1990s.

=== Chlorine–iron fire ===
The element iron can combine with chlorine at high temperatures in a strong exothermic reaction, creating a chlorine–iron fire. Chlorine–iron fires are a risk in chemical process plants, where much of the pipework that carries chlorine gas is made of steel.

== See also ==
- 2022 Aqaba toxic gas leak
- Chlorine cycle
- Chlorine gas poisoning
- Industrial gas
- Polymer degradation
- Reductive dechlorination
