= CL-35 =

CL-35 or CL35 may refer to:

- USS Indianapolis (CA-35) (CL-35), a United States Navy heavy cruiser
- Chlorine-35 (Cl-35 or ^{35}Cl), an isotope of chlorine
- Bombardier Challenger 350 (CL35), by ICAO aircraft type designator
