= Jane Selverstone =

Geologist

- Born: July 6, 1956; Cambridge, MA
- Scientific career
- Thesis: Pressure-temperature-time constraints of metamorphism and tectonism in the Tauern Window, Eastern Alps (1985)
- Doctoral advisor: Frank Spear

Jane Selverstone is a geologist known for her research into tectonic processes, especially as they apply to the Eastern Alps.

== Education and career ==
Selverstone has a B.A. in geology from Princeton University (1978), an M.S. in geology from University of Colorado in Boulder (1981), and a Ph.D. from Massachusetts Institute of Technology (1985). Following her Ph.D. Selverstone worked at Harvard University (1986-1992) and then the University of Colorado at Boulder (1992-1995) before accepting a position at the University of New Mexico in 1995. In 2000, Selverstone was promoted to professor and she transitioned to research professor in 2010.

In 2012, Selverstone was elected a fellow of the American Geophysical Union and the citation read:

For elucidating the relationships among metamorphism, fluid composition and flow, and the mechanisms of deformation in the crust.

== Research ==
She has published the finding of her research in metamorphic petrology, tectonics, geochemistry and geology in geographical journals and other peer publications hence cited with an H-index of 44 with 6096 citations and has thus published research findings in over 73 peer-reviewed journal geographical publications

Selverstone's research examines the interactions between water and rocks and changes in rocks that occur in the subsurface. Much of her research centered on the Eastern Alps (e.g.,) where her research examines the processes that lead to the formation and breakdown of new mountains, or their orogenesis. Selverstone has also used stable isotopes of chlorine to examine small-scale fluid-rock interactions. In 2010, Selverstone and colleagues discovered diamonds in the Italian Alps which were the first diamonds from an oceanic source found in the area. The geochemistry of the diamonds indicated that carbon release from the rocks was through dissolution and therefore could be a mechanism to transfer carbon from the mantle to the atmosphere.

=== Selected publications ===
- Selverstone, J.; Spear, F. S.; Franz, G.; Morteani, G. (1 January 1984). "High-Pressure Metamorphism in the SW Tauern Window, Austria: P-T Paths from Hornblende-Kyanite-Staurolite Schists". Journal of Petrology. 25 (2): 501–531. doi:10.1093/petrology/25.2.501.
- Selverstone, Jane (December 1985). "Petrologic constraints on imbrication, metamorphism, and uplift in the SW Tauern Window, eastern Alps". Tectonics. 4 (7): 687–704. Bibcode:1985Tecto...4..687S. doi:10.1029/TC004i007p00687.
- Selverstone, Jane (February 1988). "Evidence for east-west crustal extension in the Eastern Alps: Implications for the unroofing history of the Tauern window". Tectonics. 7 (1): 87–105. Bibcode:1988Tecto...7...87S. doi:10.1029/TC007i001p00087.
- Frezzotti, Maria-Luce; Huizenga, Jan-Marten; Compagnoni, Roberto; Selverstone, Jane (October 2014). "Diamond formation by carbon saturation in C–O–H fluids during cold subduction of oceanic lithosphere" (PDF). Geochimica et Cosmochimica Acta. 143: 68–86. Bibcode:2014GeCoA.143...68F. doi:10.1016/j.gca.2013.12.022.

== Awards and honors ==
- Distinguished Lecturer, Mineralogical Society of America (1992-1993)
- Fellow, Mineralogical Society of America (1994)
- Fellow, Geological Society of America (2003)
- IMPACT! Award, New Mexico Network for Women in Science and Engineering (2011)
- Fellow, American Geophysical Union (2012)
- Reginald Daly Lecturer, American Geophysical Union (2014)

== Personal life ==
Selverstone is married to the meteorologist David Gutzler and they have two children. In 2006 Selverstone and Gutzler discussed their path through different research institutions as a dual-career couple. Selverstone is also a photographer primarily interested in black and white images.
