= Chlorine-36 =

Long-lived radioisotope of chlorine

General
- Symbol: ^{36}Cl
- Names: chlorine-36
- Protons (Z): 17
- Neutrons (N): 19

Nuclide data
- Natural abundance: 7×10^{−13}
- Half-life (t_{1/2}): 3.01×10^{5} years
- Decay products: ^{36}Ar

Decay modes
- Decay mode: Decay energy (MeV)
- Beta minus: 0.710 MeV
- Electron capture: 1.142 MeV

Chlorine-36 (^{36}Cl) is a radioactive isotope of chlorine whose half-life is 301,000 years; it decays primarily (98%) by beta-minus decay to ^{36}Ar, and the balance by electron capture to ^{36}S. This cosmogenic isotope occurs in natural chlorine alongside the two stable isotopes.

Trace amounts of radioactive ^{36}Cl exist in the environment, in a ratio of about (7–10) × 10^{−13} to 1 with respect to the stable chlorine isotopes. This ^{36}Cl/Cl ratio is sometimes abbreviated as R^{36}Cl. This corresponds to a concentration of approximately 1 Bq/(kg Cl).

^{36}Cl is produced in the atmosphere by spallation of ^{36}Ar by interactions with cosmic ray protons. In the top meter of the lithosphere, ^{36}Cl is generated primarily by thermal neutron activation of ^{35}Cl and spallation of ^{39}K and ^{40}Ca. In the subsurface environment, muon capture by ^{40}Ca becomes more important. The production rates from spallation in rocks at sea level are about 4200 atoms ^{36}Cl/yr/mole ^{39}K and 3000 atoms ^{36}Cl/yr/mole ^{40}Ca.

The half-life of this isotope makes it suitable for geologic dating in the range of 60,000 to 1 million years. Its properties make it useful as a proxy data source to characterize cosmic particle bombardment and solar activity of the past.

Additionally, large amounts of ^{36}Cl were produced by irradiation of seawater during atmospheric and underwater test detonations of nuclear weapons between 1952 and 1958. The residence time of ^{36}Cl in the atmosphere is about 2 years. It is as an event marker of 1950s water in soil and ground water. ^{36}Cl has seen use in other areas of the geological sciences, including dating ice and sediments.

== See also ==
- Isotopes of chlorine
