= CL-41 =

CL-41 may refer to:

- USS Philadelphia (CL-41), a Brooklyn-class light cruiser that served in the United States Navy
- Canadair CL-41 Tutor, a Canadian jet trainer aircraft
- Chlorine-41 (Cl-41 or ^{41}Cl), an isotope of chlorine
