= Cosmogenic nuclide =

Rare nuclides created when high-energy cosmic rays interact with the nucleus of an atom

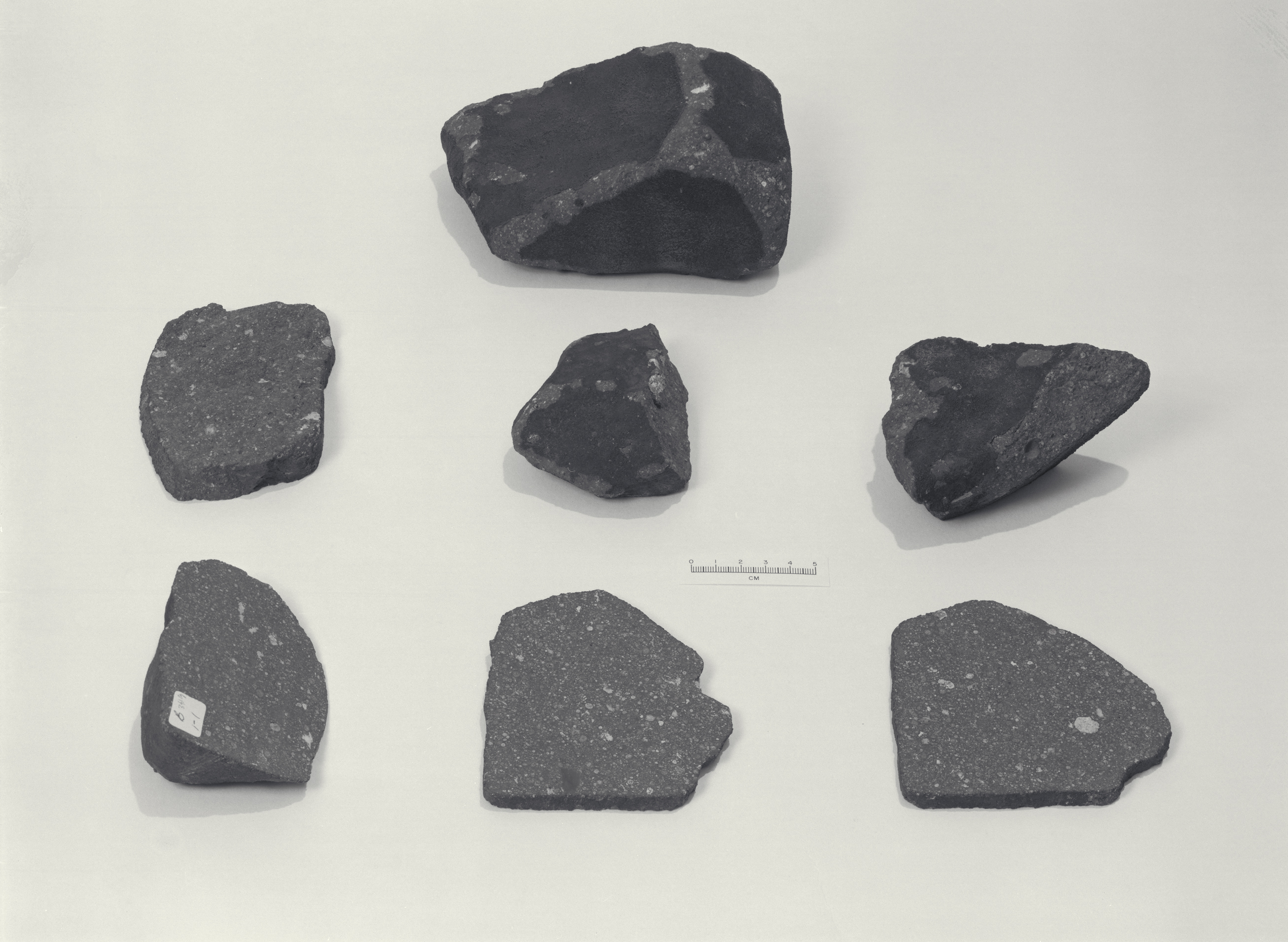
Cosmosgenic Nuclides in Allende Meteorite

Cosmogenic nuclides (or cosmogenic isotopes) are rare nuclides (isotopes) created when a high-energy cosmic ray interacts with the nucleus of an in situ Solar System atom, causing nucleons (protons and neutrons) to be expelled from the atom (see cosmic ray spallation). These nuclides are produced within Earth materials such as rocks or soil, in Earth's atmosphere, and in extraterrestrial items such as meteoroids. By measuring cosmogenic nuclides, scientists are able to gain insight into a range of geological and astronomical processes. There are both radioactive and stable cosmogenic nuclides. Some of these radionuclides are tritium, carbon-14 and phosphorus-32 (see table below).

Certain light (low atomic number) primordial nuclides (isotopes of lithium, beryllium and boron) are thought to have been created not only during the Big Bang, but also (and perhaps primarily) to have been made after the Big Bang, but before the condensation of the Solar System, by the process of cosmic ray spallation on interstellar gas and dust. This explains their higher abundance in cosmic dust as compared with their abundances on Earth. This also explains the overabundance of the early transition metals just before iron in the periodic table – the cosmic-ray spallation of iron produces scandium through chromium on the one hand and helium through boron on the other. However, the arbitrary defining qualification for cosmogenic nuclides of being formed "in situ in the Solar System" (meaning inside an already aggregated piece of the Solar System) prevents primordial nuclides formed by cosmic ray spallation before the formation of the Solar System from being termed "cosmogenic nuclides"—even though the mechanism for their formation is exactly the same. These same nuclides still arrive on Earth in small amounts in cosmic rays, and are formed in meteoroids, in the atmosphere, on Earth, "cosmogenically". However, beryllium (all of it stable beryllium-9) is present primordially in the Solar System in much larger amounts, having existed prior to the condensation of the Solar System, and thus present in the materials from which the Solar System formed.

To make the distinction in another fashion, the timing of their formation determines which subset of cosmic ray spallation-produced nuclides are termed primordial or cosmogenic (a nuclide cannot belong to both classes). By convention, certain stable nuclides of lithium, beryllium, and boron are thought to have been produced by cosmic ray spallation in the period of time between the Big Bang and the Solar System's formation (thus making these primordial nuclides, by definition) are not termed "cosmogenic", even though they were formed by the same process as the cosmogenic nuclides (although at an earlier time). The primordial nuclide beryllium-9, the only stable beryllium isotope, is an example of this type of nuclide.

In contrast, even though the radioactive isotopes beryllium-7 and beryllium-10 fall into this series of three light elements (lithium, beryllium, boron) formed mostly by cosmic ray spallation nucleosynthesis, both of these nuclides have half-lives too short (53 days and c. 1.4 million years, resp.) for them to have been formed before the formation of the Solar System, and thus they cannot be primordial nuclides. Since the cosmic ray spallation route is the only possible source of beryllium-7 and beryllium-10 occurrence naturally in the environment, they are therefore cosmogenic.

== Cosmogenic nuclides ==
Below is a list of radioisotopes formed by cosmic ray spallation, which nuclides are involved, and the half-lives of each isotope.

Isotopes formed by the action of cosmic rays
Isotope	Mode of formation	half-life
^{3}H (tritium)	^{14}N(n,^{12}C)T	12.3 y
^{7}Be	Spallation (N and O)	53.2 d
^{10}Be	Spallation (N and O)	1,387,000 y
^{11}C	Spallation (N and O)	20.3 min
^{14}C	^{14}N(n,p)^{14}C	5,730 y
^{18}F	^{18}O(p,n)^{18}F and Spallation (Ar)	110 min
^{22}Na	Spallation (Ar)	2.6 y
^{24}Na	Spallation (Ar)	15 h
^{28}Mg	Spallation (Ar)	20.9 h
^{26}Al	Spallation (Ar)	717,000 y
^{31}Si	Spallation (Ar)	157 min
^{32}Si	Spallation (Ar)	153 y
^{32}P	Spallation (Ar)	14.3 d
^{33}P	Spallation (Ar)	25.3 d
^{34m}Cl	Spallation (Ar)	34 min
^{35}S	Spallation (Ar)	87.5 d
^{36}Cl	^{35}Cl (n,γ)^{36}Cl	301,000 y
^{37}Ar	^{37}Cl (p,n)^{37}Ar	35 d
^{38}Cl	Spallation (Ar)	37 min
^{39}Ar	^{40}Ar (n,2n)^{39}Ar	269 y
^{39}Cl	^{40}Ar (n,np)^{39}Cl & spallation (Ar)	56 min
^{41}Ar	^{40}Ar (n,γ)^{41}Ar	110 min
^{41}Ca	^{40}Ca (n,γ)^{41}Ca	102,000 y
^{81}Kr	^{80}Kr (n,γ) ^{81}Kr	229,000 y
^{129}I	Spallation (Xe)	15,700,000 y

=== Applications in geology listed by isotope ===
Commonly measured long lived cosmogenic isotopes
element	mass	half-life (years)	typical application
beryllium	10	1,387,000	exposure dating of rocks, soils, ice cores
aluminium	26	720,000	exposure dating of rocks, sediment
chlorine	36	308,000	exposure dating of rocks, groundwater tracer
calcium	41	103,000	exposure dating of carbonate rocks
iodine	129	15,700,000	groundwater tracer
carbon	14	5730	radiocarbon dating
sulfur	35	0.24	water residence times
sodium	22	2.6	water residence times
tritium	3	12.32	water residence times
argon	39	269	groundwater tracer
krypton	81	229,000	groundwater tracer

== Use in geochronology ==
As seen in the table above, there are a wide variety of useful cosmogenic nuclides which can be measured in soil, rocks, groundwater, and the atmosphere. These nuclides all share the common feature of being absent in the host material at the time of formation. These nuclides are chemically distinct and fall into two categories. The nuclides of interest are either noble gases which due to their inert behavior are inherently not trapped in a crystallized mineral or has a short enough half-life such that it has decayed since nucleosynthesis, but a long enough half-life such that it has built up measurable concentrations. The former includes measuring abundances of ^{81}Kr and ^{39}Ar whereas the latter includes measuring abundances of ^{10}Be, ^{14}C, and ^{26}Al.

Three types of cosmic-ray reactions can occur once a cosmic ray strikes matter which in turn produce the measured cosmogenic nuclides.

- cosmic ray spallation, which is the most common reaction on the near-surface (typically 0 to 60 cm below) the Earth and can create secondary particles which can cause additional reaction upon interaction with another nuclei called a collision cascade.
- muon capture, which pervades at depths a few meters below the subsurface because muons are inherently less reactive; in some cases, high-energy muons can reach greater depths
- neutron capture, which due to the neutron's low energy are captured into a nucleus, most commonly by water, but this process is highly dependent on snow, soil moisture and trace element concentrations.

=== Corrections for cosmic-ray fluxes ===
Since the Earth bulges at the equator and mountains and deep oceanic trenches allow for deviations of several kilometers relative to a uniformly smooth spheroid, cosmic rays bombard the Earth's surface unevenly based on the latitude and altitude. Thus, many geographic and geologic considerations must be understood in order for cosmic-ray flux to be accurately determined. Atmospheric pressure, for example, which varies with altitude, can change the production rate of nuclides within minerals by a factor of 30 between sea level and the top of a 5 km high mountain. Even variations in the slope of the ground can affect how far high-energy muons can penetrate the subsurface. Geomagnetic field strength which varies over time affects the production rate of cosmogenic nuclides though some models assume variations of the field strength are averaged out over geologic time and are not always considered.

== See also ==
- Environmental radioactivity
