= Cosmic ray spallation =

Natural nuclear reactions forming chemical elements

Cosmic ray spallation, also known as the x-process, is a set of naturally occurring nuclear reactions causing nucleosynthesis; it refers to the formation of chemical elements from the impact of cosmic rays on an object. Cosmic rays are highly energetic charged particles from beyond Earth, ranging from protons, alpha particles, and nuclei of many heavier elements. About 1% of cosmic rays also consist of free electrons.

Cosmic rays cause spallation when a ray particle (e.g. a proton) impacts with matter, including other cosmic rays. The result of the collision is the expulsion of particles (protons, neutrons, and alpha particles) from the object hit. This process goes on not only in deep space, but in Earth's upper atmosphere and crustal surface (typically the upper ten meters) due to the ongoing impact of cosmic rays.

== The process ==
A version of the periodic table indicating the origins – including cosmic ray spallation – of the elements. All elements above 103 (lawrencium) are also man-made and are not included.

Cosmic ray spallation is thought to be responsible for the abundance in the universe of some light elements—lithium, beryllium, and boron—as well as the isotope helium-3. This process (cosmogenic nucleosynthesis) was discovered somewhat by accident during the 1970s: models of Big Bang nucleosynthesis suggested that the amount of deuterium was too large to be consistent with the expansion rate of the universe, and there was therefore great interest in processes that could generate deuterium after the Big Bang nucleosynthesis. Cosmic ray spallation was investigated as a possible process to generate deuterium. As it turned out, spallation could not generate much deuterium, but the new studies of spallation showed that this process could generate lithium, beryllium and boron; indeed, isotopes of these elements are over-represented in cosmic ray nuclei, as compared with solar atmospheres (whereas hydrogen and helium are present in about primordial ratios in cosmic rays).

An example of cosmic ray spallation is a neutron hitting a nitrogen-14 nucleus in the Earth's atmosphere, yielding a proton, an alpha particle, and a beryllium-10 nucleus, which eventually decays to boron-10. Alternatively, a proton can hit oxygen-16, yielding two protons, a neutron, and again an alpha particle and a beryllium-10 nucleus. Boron can also be created directly. The beryllium and boron are brought down to the ground by rain. See Cosmogenic nuclide for a list of nuclides produced by cosmic ray spallation.

The x-process in cosmic rays is the primary means of nucleosynthesis for the five stable isotopes of lithium, beryllium, and boron. As the proton–proton chain reaction cannot proceed beyond ^{4}He due to the unbound nature of ^{5}He and ^{5}Li, and the triple-alpha process skips over all species between ^{4}He and ^{12}C, these elements are not produced in the main reactions of stellar nucleosynthesis. In addition, nuclei of these elements (such as ^{7}Li) are relatively weakly bound, resulting in their rapid destruction in stars and no significant accumulation, although new theory suggests that ^{7}Li is generated primarily in novae eruptions. It was thus postulated that another nucleosynthesis process occurring outside stars was necessary to explain their existence in the universe. This process is now known to occur in cosmic rays, where lower temperature and particle density favor reactions leading to the synthesis of lithium, beryllium, and boron.

In addition to the above light elements, tritium and isotopes of aluminium, carbon (carbon-14), phosphorus (phosphorus-32), chlorine, iodine and neon are formed within Solar System materials through cosmic ray spallation, and are termed cosmogenic nuclides. Since they remain trapped in the atmosphere or rock in which they formed, some can be very useful for measuring the length of time that a rock has been exposed at or near Earth's surface. This is called cosmogenic radionuclide dating. In the formation of a cosmogenic nuclide, a cosmic ray interacts with the nucleus of an in situ Solar System atom, causing cosmic ray spallation. These isotopes are produced within Earth materials such as rocks or soil, in Earth's atmosphere, and in extraterrestrial items such as meteorites. By measuring cosmogenic isotopes, scientists can gain insight into a range of geological and astronomical processes. There are both radioactive and stable cosmogenic isotopes. Some of the well-known naturally occurring radioisotopes are tritium, carbon-14, and phosphorus-32.

The timing of their formation determines whether nuclides formed by cosmic ray spallation are termed primordial or are termed cosmogenic (a nuclide cannot belong to both classes). The stable nuclides of lithium, beryllium, and boron found on Earth are thought to have been formed by the same process as the cosmogenic nuclides but at an earlier time in cosmic ray spallation, predominantly before the Solar System's formation, and thus they are by definition primordial nuclides and not cosmogenic. In contrast, the radioactive nuclide beryllium-7 falls into the same light element range but has a half-life too short for it to have been formed before the formation of the Solar System, so that it cannot be a primordial nuclide. Since the cosmic ray spallation route is the most likely source of beryllium-7 in the environment, that isotope is thus cosmogenic.

== See also ==
- Cosmic rays
- Cosmogenic nuclide
- Nuclear fission
- Nucleosynthesis
- Astrophysics
- Spall, or spalling
- Spallation
- Spallation Neutron Source
- ISIS neutron source
- PSI Spallation Neutron Source (SINQ)
