= Isotopes of argon =

Isotopes of argon (_{18}Ar)
Main isotopes			Decay	
Isotope	abundance	half-life (t_{1/2})	mode	product
^{36}Ar	0.334%	stable		
^{37}Ar	trace	35.01 d	ε	^{37}Cl
^{38}Ar	0.0630%	stable		
^{39}Ar	trace	302 y	β^{−}	^{39}K
^{40}Ar	99.6%	stable		
^{41}Ar	trace	109.61 min	β^{−}	^{41}K
^{42}Ar	synth	32.9 y	β^{−}	^{42}K

Standard atomic weight A_{r}°(Ar)
- [39.792, 39.963]; 39.95±0.16 (abridged)

Argon (_{18}Ar) has 26 known isotopes, from ^{29}Ar to ^{54}Ar, of which three are stable (^{36}Ar, ^{38}Ar, and ^{40}Ar). On Earth, ^{40}Ar makes up 99.6% of natural argon. The longest-lived radioactive isotopes are ^{39}Ar with a half-life of 302 years, ^{42}Ar with a half-life of 32.9 years, and ^{37}Ar with a half-life of 35.01 days. All other isotopes have half-lives of less than two hours, and most less than one minute. Isotopes lighter than ^{38}Ar decay to chlorine or lighter elements, while heavier ones beta decay to potassium.

The naturally occurring ^{40}K, with a half-life of 1.248×10^{9} years, decays to stable ^{40}Ar by electron capture (10.72%) and by positron emission (0.001%), and also to stable ^{40}Ca via beta decay (89.28%). These properties and ratios are used to determine the age of rocks through potassium–argon dating.

Despite the trapping of ^{40}Ar in many rocks, it can be released by melting, grinding, and diffusion. Almost all argon in the Earth's atmosphere is the product of ^{40}K decay, since 99.6% of Earth's atmospheric argon is ^{40}Ar, whereas in the Sun and presumably in primordial star-forming clouds, argon consists of ~85% ^{36}Ar, ~15% ^{38}Ar and only trace ^{40}Ar. Similarly, the ratio of the isotopes ^{36}Ar:^{38}Ar:^{40}Ar in the atmospheres of the outer planets is measured to be 8400:1600:1.

In the Earth's atmosphere, radioactive ^{39}Ar (and to a lesser extent ^{37}Ar) is made by cosmic ray activity, primarily from ^{40}Ar. In the subsurface environment, ^{39}Ar is also produced through neutron capture by ^{39}K or ^{42}Ca, with proton or alpha emission respectively; ^{37}Ar was created in subsurface nuclear explosions similarly from ^{40}Ca. The content of ^{39}Ar in natural argon is measured to be of (8.6±0.4)×10^{−16} g/g, or (0.964±0.024) Bq/kg weight.

The content of ^{42}Ar (half-life 33 years) in the Earth's atmosphere, though it had previously been reported as a cosmogenic isotope, is lower than 6×10^{−21} of the element. Many endeavors require argon depleted in the cosmogenic isotopes, known as depleted argon and this may be obtained from underground sources that have been isolated from the atmosphere long enough for these isotopes to decay.

^{36}Ar, in the form of argon hydride, was detected in the Crab Nebula supernova remnant during 2013. This was the first time a noble molecule was detected in outer space.

== List of isotopes ==
Nuclide (Note: ^{m}Ar – Excited nuclear isomer.)	Z	N	Isotopic mass (Da) (Note: ( ) – Uncertainty (1σ) is given in concise form in parentheses after the corresponding last digits.) (Note: # – Atomic mass marked #: value and uncertainty derived not from purely experimental data, but at least partly from trends from the Mass Surface (TMS).)	Discovery year	Half-life	Decay mode (Note: Modes of decay: EC: / Electron capture; n: / Neutron emission; p: / Proton emission)	Daughter isotope (Note: Bold symbol as daughter – Daughter product is stable.)	Spin and parity (Note: ( ) spin value – Indicates spin with weak assignment arguments.) (Note: # – Values marked # are not purely derived from experimental data, but at least partly from trends of neighboring nuclides (TNN).)	Natural abundance (mole fraction)	
Nuclide	Excitation energy			Discovery year	Half-life	Decay mode	Daughter isotope	Spin and parity	Normal proportion	Range of variation
^{29}Ar	18	11	29.04076(47)#	2018		2p	^{27}S	5/2+#		
^{30}Ar	18	12	30.02369(19)#	2015	<10 ps	2p	^{28}S	0+		
^{31}Ar	18	13	31.012125(14)	1986	15.0(3) ms	β^{+}, p (68.3%)	^{30}S	5/2+		
^{31}Ar	18	13	31.012125(14)	1986	15.0(3) ms	β^{+} (22.63%)	^{31}Cl	5/2+		
^{31}Ar	18	13	31.012125(14)	1986	15.0(3) ms	β^{+}, 2p (9.0%)	^{29}P	5/2+		
^{31}Ar	18	13	31.012125(14)	1986	15.0(3) ms	β^{+}, 3p (0.07%)	^{28}Si	5/2+		
^{31}Ar	18	13	31.012125(14)	1986	15.0(3) ms	β^{+}, p, α? (<0.38%)	^{26}Si	5/2+		
^{31}Ar	18	13	31.012125(14)	1986	15.0(3) ms	β^{+}, α? (<0.03%)	^{27}P	5/2+		
^{31}Ar	18	13	31.012125(14)	1986	15.0(3) ms	2p? (<0.03%)	^{29}S	5/2+		
^{32}Ar	18	14	31.9976378(19)	1977	98(2) ms	β^{+} (64.42%)	^{32}Cl	0+		
^{32}Ar	18	14	31.9976378(19)	1977	98(2) ms	β^{+}, p (35.58%)	^{31}S	0+		
^{33}Ar	18	15	32.98992555(43)	1964	173.0(20) ms	β^{+} (61.3%)	^{33}Cl	1/2+		
^{33}Ar	18	15	32.98992555(43)	1964	173.0(20) ms	β^{+}, p (38.7%)	^{32}S	1/2+		
^{34}Ar	18	16	33.980270092(83)	1966	846.46(35) ms	β^{+}	^{34}Cl	0+		
^{35}Ar	18	17	34.97525772(73)	1940	1.7756(10) s	β^{+}	^{35}Cl	3/2+		
^{36}Ar	18	18	35.967545106(28)	1920	Observationally Stable (Note: Believed to undergo double electron capture to ^{36}S (lightest theoretically unstable nuclide for which no evidence of radioactivity has been observed))			0+	0.003336(210)	
^{37}Ar	18	19	36.96677630(22)	1941	35.011(19) d	EC	^{37}Cl	3/2+	Trace (Note: Cosmogenic nuclide)	
^{38}Ar	18	20	37.96273210(21)	1934	Stable			0+	0.000629(70)	
^{39}Ar (Note: Used in argon–argon dating)	18	21	38.9643130(54)	1950	302(10) y (Note: This appears reliable but the NUBASE2020 value is 268(8) years and the discrepancy is yet to be explained.)	β^{−}	^{39}K	7/2−	8×10^{−16}	
^{40}Ar (Note: Used in argon–argon dating and potassium–argon dating)	18	22	39.9623831220(23)	1920	Stable			0+	0.996035(250) (Note: Generated from ^{40}K in rocks. These ratios are terrestrial. Cosmic abundance is far less than ^{36}Ar.)	
^{41}Ar	18	23	40.96450057(37)	1936	109.61(4) min	β^{−}	^{41}K	7/2−	Trace	
^{42}Ar	18	24	41.9630457(62)	1952	32.9(11) y	β^{−}	^{42}K	0+		
^{43}Ar	18	25	42.9656361(57)	1969	5.37(6) min	β^{−}	^{43}K	5/2(−)		
^{44}Ar	18	26	43.9649238(17)	1969	11.87(5) min	β^{−}	^{44}K	0+		
^{45}Ar	18	27	44.96803973(55)	1974	21.48(15) s	β^{−}	^{45}K	(5/2−,7/2−)		
^{46}Ar	18	28	45.9680392(25)	1974	8.4(6) s	β^{−}	^{46}K	0+		
^{47}Ar	18	29	46.9727671(13)	1985	1.23(3) s	β^{−} (>99.8%)	^{47}K	(3/2)−		
^{47}Ar	18	29	46.9727671(13)	1985	1.23(3) s	β^{−}, n? (<0.2%)	^{46}K	(3/2)−		
^{48}Ar	18	30	47.976001(18)	2004	415(15) ms	β^{−} (62%)	^{48}K	0+		
^{48}Ar	18	30	47.976001(18)	2004	415(15) ms	β^{−}, n (38%)	^{47}K	0+		
^{49}Ar	18	31	48.98169(43)#	1989	236(8) ms	β^{−}	^{49}K	3/2−#		
^{49}Ar	18	31	48.98169(43)#	1989	236(8) ms	β^{−}, n (29%)	^{48}K	3/2−#		
^{49}Ar	18	31	48.98169(43)#	1989	236(8) ms	β^{−}, 2n?	^{47}K	3/2−#		
^{50}Ar	18	32	49.98580(54)#	1989	106(6) ms	β^{−} (63%)	^{50}K	0+		
^{50}Ar	18	32	49.98580(54)#	1989	106(6) ms	β^{−}, n (37%)	^{49}K	0+		
^{50}Ar	18	32	49.98580(54)#	1989	106(6) ms	β^{−}, 2n?	^{48}K	0+		
^{51}Ar	18	33	50.99303(43)#	1989	30# ms [>200 ns]	β^{−}?	^{51}K	1/2−#		
^{51}Ar	18	33	50.99303(43)#	1989	30# ms [>200 ns]	β^{−}, n?	^{50}K	1/2−#		
^{51}Ar	18	33	50.99303(43)#	1989	30# ms [>200 ns]	β^{−}, 2n?	^{49}K	1/2−#		
^{52}Ar	18	34	51.99852(64)#	2009	40# ms [>620 ns]	β^{−}?	^{52}K	0+		
^{52}Ar	18	34	51.99852(64)#	2009	40# ms [>620 ns]	β^{−}, n?	^{51}K	0+		
^{52}Ar	18	34	51.99852(64)#	2009	40# ms [>620 ns]	β^{−}, 2n?	^{50}K	0+		
^{53}Ar	18	35	53.00729(75)#	2009	20# ms [>620 ns]	β^{−}?	^{53}K	5/2−#		
^{53}Ar	18	35	53.00729(75)#	2009	20# ms [>620 ns]	β^{−}, n?	^{52}K	5/2−#		
^{53}Ar	18	35	53.00729(75)#	2009	20# ms [>620 ns]	β^{−}, 2n?	^{51}K	5/2−#		
^{54}Ar	18	36	54.01348(86)#	2018	5# ms [>400 ns]	β^{−}?	^{54}K	0+		
^{54}Ar	18	36	54.01348(86)#	2018	5# ms [>400 ns]	β^{−}, n?	^{53}K	0+		
^{54}Ar	18	36	54.01348(86)#	2018	5# ms [>400 ns]	β^{−}, 2n?	^{52}K	0+		
This table header & footer:

== See also ==
- Banana equivalent dose

Daughter products other than argon

- Isotopes of potassium
- Isotopes of chlorine
- Isotopes of sulfur
- Isotopes of phosphorus
