= Trace radioisotope =

Radioisotope that occurs naturally in trace amounts

A trace radioisotope is a radioisotope that occurs naturally in trace amounts (i.e. extremely small). Generally speaking, trace radioisotopes have half-lives that are short in comparison with the age of the Earth, since primordial nuclides tend to occur in larger than trace amounts. Trace radioisotopes are therefore present only because they are continually produced on Earth by natural processes. Natural processes which produce trace radioisotopes include cosmic ray bombardment of stable nuclides, ordinary alpha and beta decay of the long-lived heavy nuclides, thorium-232, uranium-238, and uranium-235, spontaneous fission of uranium-238, and nuclear transmutation reactions induced by natural radioactivity, such as the production of plutonium-239 and uranium-236 from neutron capture by natural uranium.

== Elements ==
The elements that occur on Earth only in traces are listed below.

Element name	Chemical Symbol
Technetium	Tc
Promethium	Pm
Polonium	Po
Astatine	At
Radon	Rn
Francium	Fr
Radium	Ra
Actinium	Ac
Protactinium	Pa
Neptunium	Np
Plutonium	Pu

Isotopes of other elements (not exhaustive):

- Tritium
- Beryllium-7
- Beryllium-10
- Carbon-14
- Fluorine-18
- Sodium-22
- Sodium-24
- Magnesium-28
- Silicon-31
- Silicon-32
- Phosphorus-32
- Sulfur-35
- Sulfur-38
- Chlorine-34m
- Chlorine-36
- Chlorine-38
- Chlorine-39
- Argon-39
- Argon-42
- Calcium-41
- Iron-52
- Cobalt-55
- Nickel-59
- Copper-60
- Germanium-64
- Selenium-79
- Krypton-81
- Strontium-90
- Rhodium-105
