= Chlorine-37 =

Isotope of chlorine

General
- Symbol: ^{37}Cl
- Names: chlorine-37
- Protons (Z): 17
- Neutrons (N): 20

Nuclide data
- Natural abundance: 24.22%
- Isotope mass: 36.965903 Da

Chlorine-37 (^{37}Cl), is one of the stable isotopes of chlorine, the other being chlorine-35 (^{35}Cl). Its nucleus contains 17 protons and 20 neutrons for a total of 37 nucleons. Chlorine-37 accounts for 24.22% of natural chlorine, with chlorine-35 the remaining 75.78%, giving chlorine in bulk an apparent atomic weight of 35.45 g/mol.

Remarkably, solar neutrinos were discovered by an experiment (Homestake Experiment) using a radiochemical method based on chlorine-37 transmutation.

== Neutrino detection ==
One of the historically important radiochemical methods of solar neutrino detection is based on inverse electron capture triggered by the absorption of an electron neutrino. Chlorine-37 transmutes into argon-37 via the reaction

^{37}Cl + ν_{e} → ^{37}Ar + e^{−}.

Argon-37 then decays via electron capture (half-life 35.01 days) into chlorine-37 via the reaction

^{37}Ar + e^{−} → ^{37}Cl + ν_{e}.

The detection of these electrons confirms that a neutrino event occurred. Detection methods involve several hundred thousand liters of carbon tetrachloride (CCl_{4}) or tetrachloroethylene (C_{2}Cl_{4}) stored in underground tanks.

== See also ==
- Beta decay
- Neutrino detection
- Isotopic tracer
- Isotopes of chlorine
