= Isotopes of chlorine =

Isotopes of chlorine (_{17}Cl)
Main isotopes			Decay	
Isotope	abundance	half-life (t_{1/2})	mode	product
^{35}Cl	75.8%	stable		
^{36}Cl	trace	3.01×10^{5} y	β^{−}	^{36}Ar
^{36}Cl	trace	3.01×10^{5} y	ε	^{36}S
^{37}Cl	24.2%	stable		

Standard atomic weight A_{r}°(Cl)
- [35.446, 35.457]; 35.45±0.01 (abridged)

Chlorine (_{17}Cl) has two stable isotopes, ^{35}Cl (75.8%) and ^{37}Cl (24.2%), giving chlorine a standard atomic weight of 35.45. Artificical radioisotopes are known ranging from ^{28}Cl to ^{52}Cl, and there are also two isomers, ^{34m}Cl and ^{38m}Cl. The longest-lived radioactive isotope is ^{36}Cl, which has a half-life of 301,000 years. All other isotopes and isomers have half-lives under an hour, and most under 10 seconds.

== List of isotopes ==
Nuclide (Note: ^{m}Cl – Excited nuclear isomer.)	Z	N	Isotopic mass (Da) (Note: ( ) – Uncertainty (1σ) is given in concise form in parentheses after the corresponding last digits.) (Note: # – Atomic mass marked #: value and uncertainty derived not from purely experimental data, but at least partly from trends from the Mass Surface (TMS).)	Discovery year	Half-life (Note: # – Values marked # are not purely derived from experimental data, but at least partly from trends of neighboring nuclides (TNN).)	Decay mode (Note: Modes of decay: IT: / Isomeric transition; n: / Neutron emission; p: / Proton emission)	Daughter isotope (Note: Bold symbol as daughter – Daughter product is stable.)	Spin and parity (Note: ( ) spin value – Indicates spin with weak assignment arguments.)	Natural abundance (mole fraction)	
Nuclide	Excitation energy			Discovery year	Half-life	Decay mode	Daughter isotope	Spin and parity	Normal proportion	Range of variation
^{28}Cl	17	11	28.03035(54)#	2018		p	^{27}S	1+#		
^{29}Cl	17	12	29.01505(20)#	2015	5.4(19) zs	p	^{28}S	(1/2+)		
^{30}Cl	17	13	30.005018(26)	2018	<50 ns	p	^{29}S	3+#		
^{31}Cl	17	14	30.9924481(37)	1977	190(1) ms	β^{+} (97.6%)	^{31}S	3/2+		
^{31}Cl	17	14	30.9924481(37)	1977	190(1) ms	β^{+}, p (2.4%)	^{30}P	3/2+		
^{32}Cl	17	15	31.98568461(60)	1953	298(1) ms	β^{+} (99.92%)	^{32}S	1+		
^{32}Cl	17	15	31.98568461(60)	1953	298(1) ms	β^{+}, α (0.054%)	^{28}Si	1+		
^{32}Cl	17	15	31.98568461(60)	1953	298(1) ms	β^{+}, p (0.026%)	^{31}P	1+		
^{33}Cl	17	16	32.97745199(42)	1940	2.5038(22) s	β^{+}	^{33}S	3/2+		
^{34}Cl	17	17	33.973762490(52)	1934	1.5267(4) s	β^{+}	^{34}S	0+		
^{34m}Cl	146.360(27) keV			1953	31.99(3) min	β^{+} (55.4%)	^{34}S	3+		
^{34m}Cl	146.360(27) keV			1953	31.99(3) min	IT (44.6%)	^{34}Cl	3+		
^{35}Cl	17	18	34.968852694(38)	1919	Stable			3/2+	0.758(2)	
^{36}Cl (Note: Used in radiodating water)	17	19	35.968306822(38)	1941	3.013(15)×10^{5} y	β^{−} (98.1%)	^{36}Ar	2+	7×10^{−13} (Note: Cosmogenic nuclide)	
^{36}Cl	17	19	35.968306822(38)	1941	3.013(15)×10^{5} y	β^{+} (1.9%)	^{36}S	2+	7×10^{−13}	
^{37}Cl	17	20	36.965902573(55)	1919	Stable			3/2+	0.242(2)	
^{38}Cl	17	21	37.96801041(11)	1940	37.230(14) min	β^{−}	^{38}Ar	2−		
^{38m}Cl	671.365(8) keV			1962	715(3) ms	IT	^{38}Cl	5−		
^{39}Cl	17	22	38.9680082(19)	1949	56.2(6) min	β^{−}	^{39}Ar	3/2+		
^{40}Cl	17	23	39.970415(34)	1956	1.35(3) min	β^{−}	^{40}Ar	2−		
^{41}Cl	17	24	40.970685(74)	1971	38.4(8) s	β^{−}	^{41}Ar	(1/2+)		
^{42}Cl	17	25	41.973342(64)	1971	6.8(3) s	β^{−}	^{42}Ar	(2−)		
^{42}Cl	17	25	41.973342(64)	1971	6.8(3) s	β^{−}, n?	^{41}Ar	(2−)		
^{43}Cl	17	26	42.974064(66)	1976	3.13(9) s	β^{−}	^{43}Ar	(3/2+)		
^{43}Cl	17	26	42.974064(66)	1976	3.13(9) s	β^{−}, n?	^{42}Ar	(3/2+)		
^{44}Cl	17	27	43.978015(92)	1979	0.56(11) s	β^{−} (>92%)	^{44}Ar	(2-)		
^{44}Cl	17	27	43.978015(92)	1979	0.56(11) s	β^{−}, n? (<8%)	^{43}Ar	(2-)		
^{45}Cl	17	28	44.98039(15)	1979	513(36) ms	β^{−} (76%)	^{45}Ar	(3/2+)		
^{45}Cl	17	28	44.98039(15)	1979	513(36) ms	β^{−}, n (24%)	^{44}Ar	(3/2+)		
^{46}Cl	17	29	45.98525(10)	1989	232(2) ms	β^{−}, n (60%)	^{45}Ar	2-#		
^{46}Cl	17	29	45.98525(10)	1989	232(2) ms	β^{−} (40%)	^{46}Ar	2-#		
^{46}Cl	17	29	45.98525(10)	1989	232(2) ms	β^{−}, 2n?	^{44}Ar	2-#		
^{47}Cl	17	30	46.98972(22)#	1989	101(5) ms	β^{−} (>97%)	^{47}Ar	3/2+#		
^{47}Cl	17	30	46.98972(22)#	1989	101(5) ms	β^{−}, n (<3%)	^{46}Ar	3/2+#		
^{47}Cl	17	30	46.98972(22)#	1989	101(5) ms	β^{−}, 2n?	^{45}Ar	3/2+#		
^{48}Cl	17	31	47.99541(54)#	1989	30# ms [>200 ns]	β^{−}?	^{48}Ar			
^{48}Cl	17	31	47.99541(54)#	1989	30# ms [>200 ns]	β^{−}, n?	^{47}Ar			
^{48}Cl	17	31	47.99541(54)#	1989	30# ms [>200 ns]	β^{−}, 2n?	^{46}Ar			
^{49}Cl	17	32	49.00079(43)#	1989	35# ms [>200 ns]	β^{−}?	^{49}Ar	3/2+#		
^{49}Cl	17	32	49.00079(43)#	1989	35# ms [>200 ns]	β^{−}, n?	^{48}Ar	3/2+#		
^{49}Cl	17	32	49.00079(43)#	1989	35# ms [>200 ns]	β^{−}, 2n?	^{47}Ar	3/2+#		
^{50}Cl	17	33	50.00827(43)#	2009	10# ms [>620 ns]	β^{−}	^{50}Ar			
^{50}Cl	17	33	50.00827(43)#	2009	10# ms [>620 ns]	β^{−}, n?	^{49}Ar			
^{50}Cl	17	33	50.00827(43)#	2009	10# ms [>620 ns]	β^{−}, 2n?	^{48}Ar			
^{51}Cl	17	34	51.01534(75)#	2009	5# ms [>200 ns]	β^{−}?	^{51}Ar	3/2+#		
^{51}Cl	17	34	51.01534(75)#	2009	5# ms [>200 ns]	β^{−}, n?	^{50}Ar	3/2+#		
^{51}Cl	17	34	51.01534(75)#	2009	5# ms [>200 ns]	β^{−}, 2n?	^{49}Ar	3/2+#		
^{52}Cl	17	35	52.02400(75)#	2018	2# ms [>400 ns]	β^{−}?	^{52}Ar			
^{52}Cl	17	35	52.02400(75)#	2018	2# ms [>400 ns]	β^{−}, n?	^{51}Ar			
^{52}Cl	17	35	52.02400(75)#	2018	2# ms [>400 ns]	β^{−}, 2n?	^{50}Ar			
This table header & footer:

== Stable isotope analysis ==
The representative terrestrial abundance of chlorine contains about is 24.2% of ^{37}Cl, with a normal range of 23.9–24.5% of chlorine atoms. When measuring deviations in isotopic composition, the usual reference point is "Standard Mean Ocean Chloride" (SMOC), although a NIST Standard Reference Material (975a) also exists. SMOC is known to have a ^{37}Cl/^{35}Cl ratio of 0.319627 ± 0.000199 (24.221% ± 0.0015% chlorine-37) and to have an atomic weight of 35.4525.

There is known variation in the isotopic abundance of chlorine. This heavier isotope tends to be more prevalent in chloride minerals than in aqueous solutions such as seawater, although the isotopic composition of organochlorine compounds can vary in either direction from the SMOC standard in the range of several parts per thousand.

== Chlorine-36 ==
Trace amounts of radioactive ^{36}Cl exist in the environment, in a ratio of about 7×10^{−13} to 1 with stable isotopes. ^{36}Cl is produced in the atmosphere by spallation of ^{36}Ar by interactions with cosmic ray protons. In the subsurface environment, ^{36}Cl is generated primarily as a result of neutron capture by ^{35}Cl or muon capture by ^{40}Ca. ^{36}Cl decays to either ^{36}S (1.9%) or to ^{36}Ar (98.1%), with a combined half-life of 308,000 years. The half-life of this hydrophilic nonreactive isotope makes it suitable for geologic dating in the range of 60,000 to 1 million years. Additionally, large amounts of ^{36}Cl were produced by neutron irradiation of seawater during atmospheric detonations of nuclear weapons between 1952 and 1958. The residence time of ^{36}Cl in the atmosphere is about 1 week. Thus, as an event marker of 1950s water in soil and ground water, ^{36}Cl is also useful for dating waters less than 50 years before the present. ^{36}Cl has seen use in other areas of the geological sciences, forecasts, and elements. In chloride-based molten salt reactors the production of ^{36}Cl by neutron capture is an inevitable consequence of using natural isotope mixtures of chlorine (i.e. Those containing ^{35}Cl). This produces a long lived radioactive product which has to be stored or disposed of. Isotope separation to produce pure ^{37}Cl can vastly reduce ^{36}Cl production, but a small amount might still be produced by (n,2n) reactions involving fast neutrons.

== Chlorine-37 ==
Besides being a component of natural stable chlorine, the chief notability of this isotope is its use to detect solar neutrinos through inverse electron capture (producing the gas ^{37}Ar). This was used in the first detection at the Homestake experiment. Subsequently gallium-71 was found more suitable for this purpose, and used in GALLEX/GNO and SAGE.

== See also ==
Daughter products other than chlorine

- Isotopes of argon
- Isotopes of sulfur
- Isotopes of phosphorus
- Isotopes of silicon
