= Muon capture =

Capture of a negative muon by a proton

Feynman diagram of the muon capture. A negatively charged muon is captured by a proton. The proton is transformed into a neutron and a muon-neutrino is emitted. The interaction is mediated by a W-boson.

Muon capture is the capture of a negative muon by a proton, usually resulting in production of a neutron and a muon neutrino, and sometimes a gamma photon.

Except for the flavor of neutrino, it has exactly the same result as electron capture, except that the great mass-energy of the muon makes it allowed for all nuclei and there is so much excess energy that a nucleus can disintegrate; for heavy nuclei this leads to emission of nuclear particles; most often neutrons, but charged particles can be emitted as well.

Ordinary muon capture (OMC) involves capture of a negative muon from the atomic orbital without emission of a gamma photon:

μ^{−} + p^{+} → ν_{μ} + n^{0}

Radiative muon capture (RMC) is a radiative version of OMC, where a gamma photon is emitted:

μ^{−} + p^{+} → ν_{μ} + n^{0} + γ

Theoretical motivation for the study of muon capture on the proton is its connection to the proton's induced pseudoscalar form factor g_{p} [1]'

The most precise measurement of the muon capture rate on the proton 𝛬_{𝑆} =(714.9 ±5.4stat ±5.1syst) s^{−1} and the induced pseudoscalar coupling constant g_{p}⁡=8.06 ±0.55 was done by the MUCAP experiment [2,3] with a measurement performed at the Paul Scherrer Institut, Switzerland. The result is in excellent agreement with theoretical predictions [1].

== Nuclear waste disposal ==
Muon capture is being investigated for practical application in radioactive waste disposal, for example in the artificial transmutation of large quantities of long-lived radioactive waste that have been produced globally by fission reactors. Radioactive waste can be transmuted to stable isotopes following irradiation by an incident muon (μ^{−}) beam from a compact proton accelerator source.
