= CNO cycle =

Nuclear fusion reaction

Logarithm of the relative energy output (ε) of proton–proton (p–p), CNO, and triple-α fusion processes at different temperatures (T). The dashed line shows the combined energy generation of the p–p and CNO processes within a star.

In astrophysics, the carbon–nitrogen–oxygen cycle (CNO cycle), sometimes called Bethe–Weizsäcker cycle after Hans Albrecht Bethe and Carl Friedrich von Weizsäcker, is one of the two known sets of fusion reactions by which stars convert hydrogen to helium, the other being the proton–proton chain reaction (p–p chain), which is more efficient at the Sun's core temperature. The CNO cycle is hypothesized to be dominant in stars that are more than 1.3 times as massive as the Sun.

Unlike the proton-proton reaction, which consumes all its constituents, the CNO cycle is a catalytic cycle. In the CNO cycle, four protons fuse, using isotopes of carbon, nitrogen, and oxygen as catalysts, each of which is consumed at one step of the CNO cycle, but re-generated in a later step. The end product is one alpha particle (a stable helium nucleus), two positrons, and two electron neutrinos.

There are various alternative paths and catalysts involved in the CNO cycles, but all these cycles have the same net result:

4 ^{1}_{1}H + 2 e^{−}

→ ^{4}_{2}He + 2 e^{+} + 2 e^{−} + 2 ν_{e} + 3 γ + 24.7 MeV
→ ^{4}_{2}He + 2 ν_{e} + 7 γ + 26.7 MeV

The positrons will almost instantly annihilate with electrons, releasing energy in the form of gamma rays. The neutrinos escape from the star carrying away some energy. One nucleus goes on to become carbon, nitrogen, and oxygen isotopes through a number of transformations in a repeating cycle.

Overview of the CNO-I Cycle

The proton–proton chain is more prominent in stars the mass of the Sun or less. This difference stems from temperature dependency differences between the two reactions; pp-chain reaction starts at temperatures around 4×10^{6} K (4 megakelvins), making it the dominant energy source in smaller stars. A self-maintaining CNO chain starts at approximately 15×10^{6} K, but its energy output rises much more rapidly with increasing temperatures so that it becomes the dominant source of energy at approximately 17×10^{6} K.

The Sun has a core temperature of around 15.7×10^{6} K, and only 1.7% of ^{4}He nuclei produced in the Sun are born in the CNO cycle.

The CNO-I process was independently proposed by Carl von Weizsäcker and Hans Bethe in the late 1930s.

The first reports of the experimental detection of the neutrinos produced by the CNO cycle in the Sun were published in 2020 by the BOREXINO collaboration. This was also the first experimental confirmation that the Sun had a CNO cycle, that the proposed magnitude of the cycle was accurate, and that von Weizsäcker and Bethe were correct.

== Cold CNO cycles ==
Under typical conditions found in stars, catalytic hydrogen burning by the CNO cycles is limited by proton captures. Specifically, the timescale for beta decay of the radioactive nuclei produced is faster than the timescale for fusion. Because of the long timescales involved, the cold CNO cycles convert hydrogen to helium slowly, allowing them to power stars in quiescent equilibrium for many years.

=== CNO-I ===
The first proposed catalytic cycle for the conversion of hydrogen into helium was initially called the carbon–nitrogen cycle (CN-cycle), also referred to as the Bethe–Weizsäcker cycle in honor of the independent work of Carl Friedrich von Weizsäcker in 1937–38 and Hans Bethe. Bethe's 1939 papers on the CN-cycle drew on three earlier papers written in collaboration with Robert Bacher and Milton Stanley Livingston and which came to be known informally as Bethe's Bible. It was considered the standard work on nuclear physics for many years and was a significant factor in his being awarded the 1967 Nobel Prize in Physics. Bethe's original calculations suggested the CN-cycle was the Sun's primary source of energy. This conclusion arose from a belief that is now known to be mistaken, that the abundance of nitrogen in the sun is approximately 10%; it is actually less than half a percent. The CN-cycle, named as it contains no stable isotope of oxygen, involves the following cycle of transformations:

^{12}_{6}C → ^{13}_{7}N → ^{13}_{6}C → ^{14}_{7}N → ^{15}_{8}O → ^{15}_{7}N → ^{12}_{6}C

This cycle is now understood as being the first part of a larger process, the CNO-cycle, and the main reactions in this part of the cycle (CNO-I) are:

^{12}_{6}C	+	^{1}_{1}H	→	^{13}_{7}N	+	γ			+	1.95 MeV
^{13}_{7}N			→	^{13}_{6}C	+	e^{+}	+	ν_{e}	+	1.20 MeV	(half-life of 9.965 minutes)
^{13}_{6}C	+	^{1}_{1}H	→	^{14}_{7}N	+	γ			+	7.54 MeV
^{14}_{7}N	+	^{1}_{1}H	→	^{15}_{8}O	+	γ			+	7.35 MeV
^{15}_{8}O			→	^{15}_{7}N	+	e^{+}	+	ν_{e}	+	1.73 MeV	(half-life of 122.24 seconds)
^{15}_{7}N	+	^{1}_{1}H	→	^{12}_{6}C	+	^{4}_{2}He			+	4.96 MeV

where the carbon-12 nucleus used in the first reaction is regenerated in the last reaction. After the two positrons (emitted by beta-plus decay) annihilate with two ambient electrons producing an additional 2.04 MeV, the total energy released in one cycle is 26.73 MeV; in some texts, authors are erroneously including the positron annihilation energy in with the Q-value for beta-decay and then neglecting the equal amount of energy released by annihilation, leading to possible confusion. All values are calculated with reference to the Atomic Mass Evaluation 2003.

The limiting (slowest) reaction in the CNO-I cycle is the proton capture on ^{14}_{7}N. In 2006 it was experimentally measured down to stellar energies, revising the calculated age of globular clusters by around 1 billion years.

The neutrinos emitted in beta decay will have a spectrum of energy ranges, because although momentum is conserved, the momentum can be shared in any way between the positron and neutrino, with either emitted at rest and the other taking away the full energy, or anything in between, so long as all the energy from the Q-value is used. The total momentum received by the positron and the neutrino is not great enough to cause a significant recoil of the much heavier daughter nucleus (Note: Note: It is not important how invariant masses of e and ν are small, because they are already small enough to become relativistic. What is important is that the daughter nucleus is heavy compared to p/c .) and hence, its contribution to kinetic energy of the products, for the precision of values given here, can be neglected. Thus the neutrino emitted during the decay of nitrogen-13 can have an energy from zero up to 1.20 MeV, and the neutrino emitted during the decay of oxygen-15 can have an energy from zero up to 1.73 MeV. On average, about 1.7 MeV of the total energy output is taken away by neutrinos for each loop of the cycle, leaving about 25 MeV available for producing luminosity.

=== CNO-II ===
In a minor branch of the above reaction, occurring in the Sun's core 0.04% of the time, the final reaction involving ^{15}_{7}N shown above does not produce carbon-12 and an alpha particle, but instead produces oxygen-16 and a photon and continues

^{15}_{7}N → ^{16}_{8}O → ^{17}_{9}F → ^{17}_{8}O → ^{14}_{7}N → ^{15}_{8}O → ^{15}_{7}N

In detail:

^{15}_{7}N	+	^{1}_{1}H	→	^{16}_{8}O	+	γ			+	12.13 MeV
^{16}_{8}O	+	^{1}_{1}H	→	^{17}_{9}F	+	γ			+	0.60 MeV
^{17}_{9}F			→	^{17}_{8}O	+	e^{+}	+	ν_{e}	+	2.76 MeV	(half-life of 64.49 seconds)
^{17}_{8}O	+	^{1}_{1}H	→	^{14}_{7}N	+	^{4}_{2}He			+	1.19 MeV
^{14}_{7}N	+	^{1}_{1}H	→	^{15}_{8}O	+	γ			+	7.35 MeV
^{15}_{8}O			→	^{15}_{7}N	+	e^{+}	+	ν_{e}	+	2.75 MeV	(half-life of 122.24 seconds)

Like the carbon, nitrogen, and oxygen involved in the main branch, the fluorine produced in the minor branch is merely an intermediate product; at steady state, it does not accumulate in the star.

=== CNO-III ===
This subdominant branch is significant only for massive stars. The reactions are started when one of the reactions in CNO-II results in fluorine-18 and a photon instead of nitrogen-14 and an alpha particle, and continues

^{17}_{8}O → ^{18}_{9}F → ^{18}_{8}O → ^{15}_{7}N → ^{16}_{8}O → ^{17}_{9}F → ^{17}_{8}O

In detail:

^{17}_{8}O	+	^{1}_{1}H	→	^{18}_{9}F	+	γ			+	5.61 MeV
^{18}_{9}F			→	^{18}_{8}O	+	e^{+}	+	ν_{e}	+	1.656 MeV	(half-life of 109.771 min)
^{18}_{8}O	+	^{1}_{1}H	→	^{15}_{7}N	+	^{4}_{2}He			+	3.98 MeV
^{15}_{7}N	+	^{1}_{1}H	→	^{16}_{8}O	+	γ			+	12.13 MeV
^{16}_{8}O	+	^{1}_{1}H	→	^{17}_{9}F	+	γ			+	0.60 MeV
^{17}_{9}F			→	^{17}_{8}O	+	e^{+}	+	ν_{e}	+	2.76 MeV	(half-life of 64.49 s)

=== CNO-IV ===
A proton reacts with a nucleus causing release of an alpha particle.

Like the CNO-III, this branch is also only significant in massive stars. The reactions are started when one of the reactions in CNO-III results in fluorine-19 and a photon instead of nitrogen-15 and an alpha particle, and continues

^{18}_{8}O → ^{19}_{9}F → ^{16}_{8}O → ^{17}_{9}F → ^{17}_{8}O → ^{18}_{9}F → ^{18}_{8}O

In detail:

^{18}_{8}O	+	^{1}_{1}H	→	^{19}_{9}F	+	γ			+	7.994 MeV
^{19}_{9}F	+	^{1}_{1}H	→	^{16}_{8}O	+	^{4}_{2}He			+	8.114 MeV
^{16}_{8}O	+	^{1}_{1}H	→	^{17}_{9}F	+	γ			+	0.60 MeV
^{17}_{9}F			→	^{17}_{8}O	+	e^{+}	+	ν_{e}	+	2.76 MeV	(half-life of 64.49 seconds)
^{17}_{8}O	+	^{1}_{1}H	→	^{18}_{9}F	+	γ			+	5.61 MeV
^{18}_{9}F			→	^{18}_{8}O	+	e^{+}	+	ν_{e}	+	1.656 MeV	(half-life of 109.771 minutes)

In some instances ^{18}_{9}F can combine with a helium nucleus, forming ^{21}_{11}Na, to start a neon-sodium cycle, in which:

^{21}_{11}Na → ^{21}_{10}Ne → ^{22}_{11}Na → ^{22}_{10}Ne → ^{23}_{11}Na → ^{20}_{10}Ne → ^{21}_{11}Na

The sodium-23 can also turn into magnesium-24 after proton bombardment, initiating a magnesium-aluminium cycle, in which:

^{24}_{12}Mg → ^{25}_{13}Al → ^{25}_{12}Mg → ^{26}_{13}Al → ^{26}_{12}Mg → ^{27}_{13}Al → ^{24}_{12}Mg

== Hot CNO cycles ==
Under conditions of higher temperature and pressure, such as those found in novae and X-ray bursts, the rate of proton captures exceeds the rate of beta-decay, pushing the burning to the proton drip line. The essential idea is that a radioactive species will capture a proton before it can beta decay, opening new nuclear burning pathways that are otherwise inaccessible. Because of the higher temperatures involved, these catalytic cycles are typically referred to as the hot CNO cycles; because the timescales are limited by beta decays instead of proton captures, they are also called the beta-limited CNO cycles.

=== HCNO-I ===
The difference between the CNO-I cycle and the HCNO-I cycle is that ^{13}_{7}N captures a proton instead of decaying, leading to the total sequence

^{12}_{6}C→^{13}_{7}N→^{14}_{8}O→^{14}_{7}N→^{15}_{8}O→^{15}_{7}N→^{12}_{6}C

In detail:

^{12}_{6}C	+	^{1}_{1}H	→	^{13}_{7}N	+	γ			+	1.95 MeV
^{13}_{7}N	+	^{1}_{1}H	→	^{14}_{8}O	+	γ			+	4.63 MeV
^{14}_{8}O			→	^{14}_{7}N	+	e^{+}	+	ν_{e}	+	5.14 MeV	(half-life of 70.641 seconds)
^{14}_{7}N	+	^{1}_{1}H	→	^{15}_{8}O	+	γ			+	7.35 MeV
^{15}_{8}O			→	^{15}_{7}N	+	e^{+}	+	ν_{e}	+	2.75 MeV	(half-life of 122.24 seconds)
^{15}_{7}N	+	^{1}_{1}H	→	^{12}_{6}C	+	^{4}_{2}He			+	4.96 MeV

=== HCNO-II ===
The notable difference between the CNO-II cycle and the HCNO-II cycle is that ^{17}_{9}F captures a proton instead of decaying, and neon is produced in a subsequent reaction on ^{18}_{9}F, leading to the total sequence

^{15}_{7}N→^{16}_{8}O→^{17}_{9}F→^{18}_{10}Ne→^{18}_{9}F→^{15}_{8}O→^{15}_{7}N

In detail:

^{15}_{7}N	+	^{1}_{1}H	→	^{16}_{8}O	+	γ			+	12.13 MeV
^{16}_{8}O	+	^{1}_{1}H	→	^{17}_{9}F	+	γ			+	0.60 MeV
^{17}_{9}F	+	^{1}_{1}H	→	^{18}_{10}Ne	+	γ			+	3.92 MeV
^{18}_{10}Ne			→	^{18}_{9}F	+	e^{+}	+	ν_{e}	+	4.44 MeV	(half-life of 1.672 seconds)
^{18}_{9}F	+	^{1}_{1}H	→	^{15}_{8}O	+	^{4}_{2}He			+	2.88 MeV
^{15}_{8}O			→	^{15}_{7}N	+	e^{+}	+	ν_{e}	+	2.75 MeV	(half-life of 122.24 seconds)

=== HCNO-III ===
An alternative to the HCNO-II cycle is that ^{18}_{9}F captures a proton moving towards higher mass and using the same helium production mechanism as the CNO-IV cycle as

^{18}_{9}F→^{19}_{10}Ne→^{19}_{9}F→^{16}_{8}O→^{17}_{9}F→^{18}_{10}Ne→^{18}_{9}F

In detail:

^{18}_{9}F	+	^{1}_{1}H	→	^{19}_{10}Ne	+	γ			+	6.41 MeV
^{19}_{10}Ne			→	^{19}_{9}F	+	e^{+}	+	ν_{e}	+	3.32 MeV	(half-life of 17.22 seconds)
^{19}_{9}F	+	^{1}_{1}H	→	^{16}_{8}O	+	^{4}_{2}He			+	8.11 MeV
^{16}_{8}O	+	^{1}_{1}H	→	^{17}_{9}F	+	γ			+	0.60 MeV
^{17}_{9}F	+	^{1}_{1}H	→	^{18}_{10}Ne	+	γ			+	3.92 MeV
^{18}_{10}Ne			→	^{18}_{9}F	+	e^{+}	+	ν_{e}	+	4.44 MeV	(half-life of 1.672 seconds)

== Use in astronomy ==
While the total number of "catalytic" nuclei are conserved in the cycle, in stellar evolution the relative proportions of the nuclei are altered. When the cycle is run to equilibrium, the ratio of the carbon-12/carbon-13 nuclei is driven to 3.5, and nitrogen-14 becomes the most numerous nucleus, regardless of initial composition. During a star's evolution, convective mixing episodes moves material, within which the CNO cycle has operated, from the star's interior to the surface, altering the observed composition of the star. Red giant stars are observed to have lower carbon-12/carbon-13 and carbon-12/nitrogen-14 ratios than do main sequence stars, which is considered to be convincing evidence for the operation of the CNO cycle.

== See also ==
- Aneutronic fusion
- Cold fusion
- Fusion power
- Neutrino astronomy
- Nuclear fusion
- Proton–proton chain, as found in stars like the Sun
- Stellar nucleosynthesis, the whole topic
- Triple-alpha process, how ^{12}C is produced from lighter nuclei
