= Table of nuclides =

Graph of neutrons vs. protons in nuclides

A table or chart of nuclides is a two-dimensional graph of isotopes of the chemical elements, in which one axis represents the number of neutrons (symbol N) and the other represents the number of protons (atomic number, symbol Z) in the atomic nucleus. Each point plotted on the graph thus represents a nuclide of a known or hypothetical element. This system of ordering nuclides can offer a greater insight into the characteristics of isotopes than the better-known periodic table, which shows only elements and not their isotopes. The chart of the nuclides is also known as the Segrè chart, after Italian physicist Emilio Segrè.

== History ==
Starting in 1936, many versions of isotope tables were developed by nuclear scientists, including Hans Bethe, M. Stanley Livingston, John J. Livingood and Glenn Seaborg. Italian physicist Emilio Segrè, was the first to develop a chart that presented all known nuclides. This was published in May 15, 1945, though without the classified progress made by scientists during World War II.

== Description and utility ==
A chart or table of nuclides maps the nuclear, or radioactive, behavior of nuclides, as it distinguishes the isotopes of an element. It contrasts with a periodic table, which only maps their chemical behavior, since isotopes (nuclides that are variants of the same element) do not differ chemically to any significant degree, with the exception of hydrogen. Nuclide charts organize nuclides along the X axis by their numbers of neutrons and along the Y axis by their numbers of protons, out to the limits of the neutron and proton drip lines. This representation was first published by Kurt Guggenheimer in 1934 and expanded by Giorgio Fea in 1935, Emilio Segrè in 1945 or Glenn Seaborg. In 1958, Walter Seelmann-Eggebert and Gerda Pfennig published the first edition of the Karlsruhe Nuclide Chart. Its 7th edition was made available in 2006. Today, there are several nuclide charts, four of which have a wide distribution: the Karlsruhe Nuclide Chart, the Strasbourg Universal Nuclide Chart, the Chart of the Nuclides from the Japan Atomic Energy Agency (JAEA), and the Nuclide Chart from Knolls Atomic Power Laboratory in the United States. It has become a basic tool of the nuclear community.

The 'moves' made in different kinds of decay

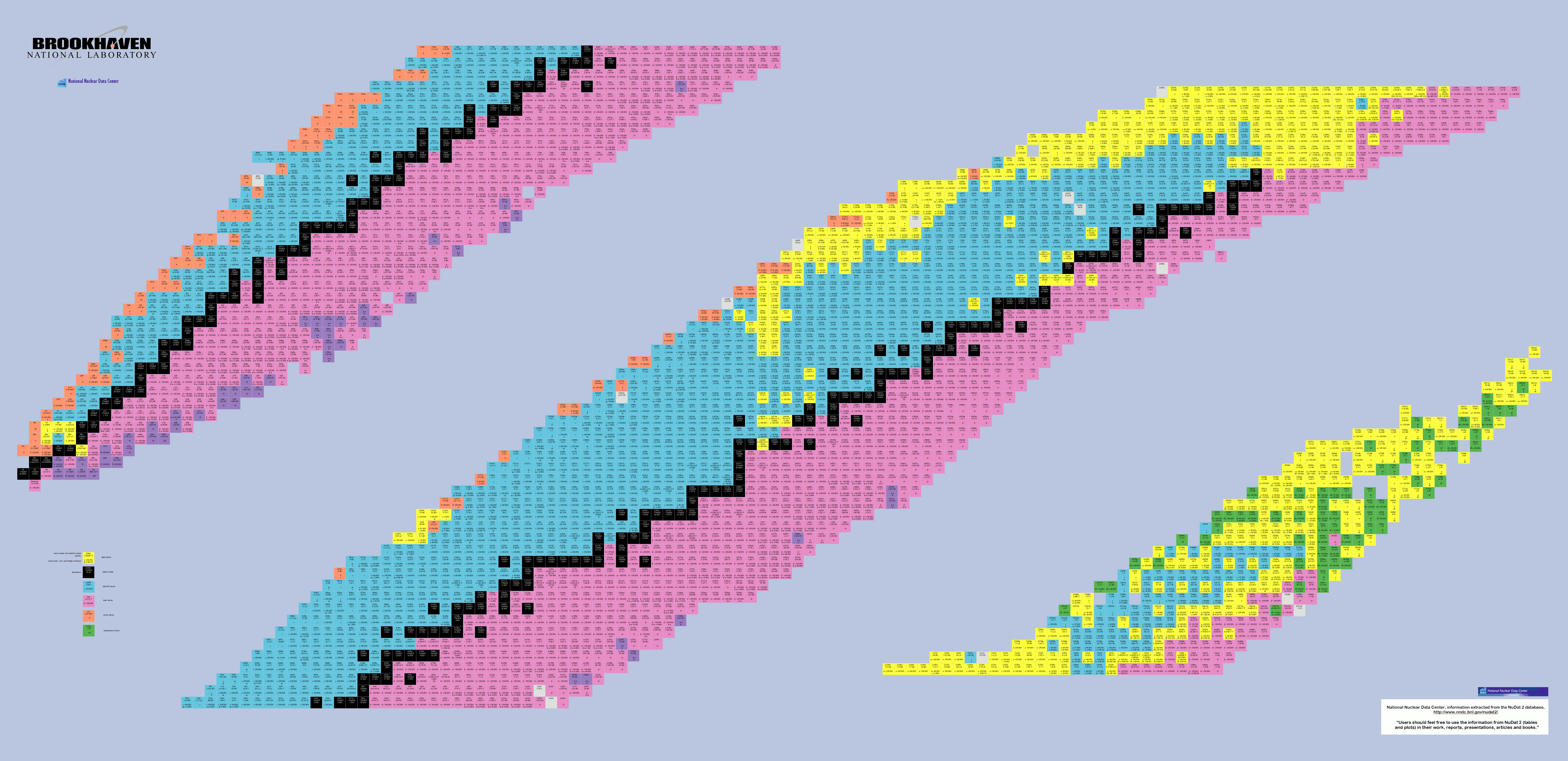
A chart of nuclides. Above, cut into three parts for better presentation; below, combined.

Decay modes
- None (stable)
- Positron emission or electron capture (decay moves atom one place diagonally down and to right)
- Proton emission (decay moves atom one place down)
- Neutron emission (decay moves atom one place to left)
- Alpha decay (decay moves atom two places diagonally down and to left)
- Spontaneous fission
- Beta decay (decay moves atom one place diagonally up and to left)

== Trends in the chart of nuclides ==
The trends in this section refer to the following chart, which shows Z increasing to the right and N increasing downward, a 90° clockwise rotation of the above landscape-orientation charts.

5	^{6}H	^{7}He	^{8}Li	^{9}Be	^{10}B	^{11}C	^{12}N	^{13}O	^{14}F	^{15}Ne	Na	Mg	13	
6	^{7}H	^{8}He	^{9}Li	^{10}Be	^{11}B	^{12}C	^{13}N	^{14}O	^{15}F	^{16}Ne	^{17}Na	^{18}Mg	Al	14
	7	^{9}He	^{10}Li	^{11}Be	^{12}B	^{13}C	^{14}N	^{15}O	^{16}F	^{17}Ne	^{18}Na	^{19}Mg	^{20}Al	Si
	8	^{10}He	^{11}Li	^{12}Be	^{13}B	^{14}C	^{15}N	^{16}O	^{17}F	^{18}Ne	^{19}Na	^{20}Mg	^{21}Al	^{22}Si
		9	^{12}Li	^{13}Be	^{14}B	^{15}C	^{16}N	^{17}O	^{18}F	^{19}Ne	^{20}Na	^{21}Mg	^{22}Al	^{23}Si

Isotope half-lives. The darker more stable isotope region departs from the line of protons (Z) = neutrons (N) as the element number Z becomes larger

- Isotopes are nuclides with the same number of protons but differing numbers of neutrons; that is, they have the same atomic number and are therefore the same chemical element. Isotopes neighbor each other vertically. Examples include carbon-12, carbon-13, and carbon-14 in the table above.
- Isotones are nuclides with the same number of neutrons but differing numbers of protons. Isotones neighbor each other horizontally. Examples include carbon-14, nitrogen-15, and oxygen-16 in the table above.
- Isobars are nuclides with the same number of nucleons (i.e. mass number) but different numbers of protons and neutrons. Isobars neighbor each other diagonally from lower-left to upper-right. Examples include carbon-14, nitrogen-14, and oxygen-14 in the table above.
- Isodiaphers are nuclides with the same difference between their numbers of neutrons and protons (N − Z). Like isobars, they follow diagonal lines, but at right angles to the isobar lines (from upper-left to lower-right). Examples include boron-10, carbon-12, and nitrogen-14 (as N − Z = 0 for each pair), or boron-12, carbon-14, and nitrogen-16 (as N − Z = 2 for each pair).
- Beyond the neutron drip line along the lower left, nuclides decay by neutron emission.
- Beyond the proton drip line along the upper right, nuclides decay by proton emission. Drip lines have only been established for some elements.
- The island of stability is a hypothetical region in the top right cluster of nuclides that contains isotopes far more stable than other transuranic elements.
- There are no stable nuclides having an equal number of protons and neutrons in their nuclei with atomic number greater than 20 (i.e. calcium) as can be readily observed from the chart. Nuclei of greater atomic number require an excess of neutrons for stability.
- The only stable nuclides having an odd number of protons and an odd number of neutrons are hydrogen-2 (deuterium), lithium-6, boron-10, nitrogen-14 and (observationally) tantalum-180m. This is because the mass–energy of such atoms is usually higher than that of their neighbors on the same isobaric chain, so most of them are unstable to beta decay.
- There are no stable nuclides with mass number 5 or 8. There are stable nuclides with all other mass numbers up to 208 with the exceptions of 147 and 151, which are represented by the very long-lived samarium-147 and europium-151. (Bismuth-209 was found to be radioactive in 2003, but with a half-life of 2.01×10^{19} years.)
- With the exception of the pair tellurium-123 and antimony-123, odd mass numbers are never represented by more than one stable nuclide. This is because the mass–energy is a convex function of atomic number, so all nuclides on an odd isobaric chain except one have a lower-energy neighbor to which they can decay by beta decay. See Mattauch isobar rule. (^{123}Te is expected to decay to ^{123}Sb, but the half-life appears to be so long that the decay has never been observed.)
- There are no stable nuclides having atomic number greater than Z = 82 (lead), although bismuth (Z = 83) is stable for all practical human purposes, and thorium (Z = 90) and uranium (Z = 92) are sufficiently long-lived to occur on Earth in large quantities. Elements with atomic numbers from 1 to 82 all have stable isotopes, with the exceptions of technetium (Z = 43) and promethium (Z = 61).

== Tables ==
Half-lives (example: most stable isotopes)
^{210}At	< 1 day
^{222}Rn	1–10 days
^{258}Md	10–100 days
^{252}Es	100 days–10 a
^{226}Ra	10–10,000 a
^{97}Tc	10 ka–700 Ma
^{238}U	> 700 Ma
^{12}C	Stable
^{94}Nb	Border: Isomer is < 1 day
^{198}Au	Border: Isomer is 1–10 days
^{91}Nb	Border: Isomer is 10–100 days
^{102}Rh	Border: Isomer is 100 days – 10 years
^{93}Nb	Border: Isomer is 10–10,000 years
^{210}Bi	Border: Isomer is 10k–103M years
^{180}Ta	Border: Isomer is Stable

For convenience, three different views of the data are available on Wikipedia: two sets of "segmented tables", and a single "unitized table (all elements)". The unitized table allows easy visualization of proton/neutron-count trends but requires simultaneous horizontal and vertical scrolling. The segmented tables permit easier examination of a particular chemical element with much less scrolling. Links are provided to quickly jump between the different sections.

=== Segmented tables ===
- Table of nuclides (segmented, narrow)
- Table of nuclides (segmented, wide)

=== Full table ===
The nuclide table below shows nuclides (often loosely called "isotopes", but this term properly refers to nuclides with the same atomic number, see above), including all with half-life of at least one day. They are arranged with increasing atomic numbers from left to right and increasing neutron numbers from top to bottom.

Cell color denotes the half-life of each nuclide; if a border is present, its color indicates the half-life of the most stable nuclear isomer. In graphical browsers, each nuclide also has a tool tip indicating its half-life.

Each color represents a certain range of length of half-life, and the color of the border indicates the half-life of its nuclear isomer state. Some nuclides have multiple nuclear isomers, and this table notes the one with the longest half-life.

Dotted borders mean that a nuclide has a nuclear isomer with a half-life in the same range as the ground state nuclide. The dashed lines between several nuclides of the first few elements are the experimentally determined proton and neutron drip lines.

Z →	0	1	2	3																																																																																												
n ↓	n	H	He	Li	4	5																																																																																										
0		^{1}H			Be	B	6	7																																																																																								
1	^{1}n	^{2}H	^{3}He	^{4}Li			C	N	8																																																																																							
2		^{3}H	^{4}He	^{5}Li	^{6}Be	^{7}B	^{8}C	^{9}N	O	9																																																																																						
3		^{4}H	^{5}He	^{6}Li	^{7}Be	^{8}B	^{9}C	^{10}N	^{11}O	F	10																																																																																					
4		^{5}H	^{6}He	^{7}Li	^{8}Be	^{9}B	^{10}C	^{11}N	^{12}O	^{13}F	Ne	11	12																																																																																			
	5	^{6}H	^{7}He	^{8}Li	^{9}Be	^{10}B	^{11}C	^{12}N	^{13}O	^{14}F	^{15}Ne	Na	Mg	13																																																																																		
	6	^{7}H	^{8}He	^{9}Li	^{10}Be	^{11}B	^{12}C	^{13}N	^{14}O	^{15}F	^{16}Ne	^{17}Na	^{18}Mg	Al	14																																																																																	
		7	^{9}He	^{10}Li	^{11}Be	^{12}B	^{13}C	^{14}N	^{15}O	^{16}F	^{17}Ne	^{18}Na	^{19}Mg	^{20}Al	Si	15																																																																																
		8	^{10}He	^{11}Li	^{12}Be	^{13}B	^{14}C	^{15}N	^{16}O	^{17}F	^{18}Ne	^{19}Na	^{20}Mg	^{21}Al	^{22}Si	P	16																																																																															
			9	^{12}Li	^{13}Be	^{14}B	^{15}C	^{16}N	^{17}O	^{18}F	^{19}Ne	^{20}Na	^{21}Mg	^{22}Al	^{23}Si		S	17	18																																																																													
			10	^{13}Li	^{14}Be	^{15}B	^{16}C	^{17}N	^{18}O	^{19}F	^{20}Ne	^{21}Na	^{22}Mg	^{23}Al	^{24}Si			Cl	Ar	19																																																																												
				11	^{15}Be	^{16}B	^{17}C	^{18}N	^{19}O	^{20}F	^{21}Ne	^{22}Na	^{23}Mg	^{24}Al	^{25}Si	^{26}P	^{27}S	^{28}Cl	^{29}Ar	K	20																																																																											
				12	^{16}Be	^{17}B	^{18}C	^{19}N	^{20}O	^{21}F	^{22}Ne	^{23}Na	^{24}Mg	^{25}Al	^{26}Si	^{27}P	^{28}S	^{29}Cl	^{30}Ar	^{31}K	Ca	21																																																																										
					13	^{18}B	^{19}C	^{20}N	^{21}O	^{22}F	^{23}Ne	^{24}Na	^{25}Mg	^{26}Al	^{27}Si	^{28}P	^{29}S	^{30}Cl	^{31}Ar			Sc	22																																																																									
					14	^{19}B	^{20}C	^{21}N	^{22}O	^{23}F	^{24}Ne	^{25}Na	^{26}Mg	^{27}Al	^{28}Si	^{29}P	^{30}S	^{31}Cl	^{32}Ar	^{33}K			Ti	23																																																																								
					15	^{20}B		^{22}N	^{23}O	^{24}F	^{25}Ne	^{26}Na	^{27}Mg	^{28}Al	^{29}Si	^{30}P	^{31}S	^{32}Cl	^{33}Ar	^{34}K	^{35}Ca			V	24																																																																							
					16	^{21}B	^{22}C	^{23}N	^{24}O	^{25}F	^{26}Ne	^{27}Na	^{28}Mg	^{29}Al	^{30}Si	^{31}P	^{32}S	^{33}Cl	^{34}Ar	^{35}K	^{36}Ca	^{37}Sc			Cr	25																																																																						
						17			^{25}O	^{26}F	^{27}Ne	^{28}Na	^{29}Mg	^{30}Al	^{31}Si	^{32}P	^{33}S	^{34}Cl	^{35}Ar	^{36}K	^{37}Ca	^{38}Sc	^{39}Ti			Mn	26																																																																					
							18		^{26}O	^{27}F	^{28}Ne	^{29}Na	^{30}Mg	^{31}Al	^{32}Si	^{33}P	^{34}S	^{35}Cl	^{36}Ar	^{37}K	^{38}Ca	^{39}Sc	^{40}Ti		^{42}Cr		Fe	27	28																																																																			
								19	^{27}O	^{28}F	^{29}Ne	^{30}Na	^{31}Mg	^{32}Al	^{33}Si	^{34}P	^{35}S	^{36}Cl	^{37}Ar	^{38}K	^{39}Ca	^{40}Sc	^{41}Ti		^{43}Cr		^{45}Fe	Co	Ni																																																																			
								20	^{28}O	^{29}F	^{30}Ne	^{31}Na	^{32}Mg	^{33}Al	^{34}Si	^{35}P	^{36}S	^{37}Cl	^{38}Ar	^{39}K	^{40}Ca	^{41}Sc	^{42}Ti	^{43}V	^{44}Cr		^{46}Fe		^{48}Ni																																																																			
									21	^{30}F	^{31}Ne	^{32}Na	^{33}Mg	^{34}Al	^{35}Si	^{36}P	^{37}S	^{38}Cl	^{39}Ar	^{40}K	^{41}Ca	^{42}Sc	^{43}Ti	^{44}V	^{45}Cr	^{46}Mn	^{47}Fe		^{49}Ni	29																																																																		
									22	^{31}F	^{32}Ne	^{33}Na	^{34}Mg	^{35}Al	^{36}Si	^{37}P	^{38}S	^{39}Cl	^{40}Ar	^{41}K	^{42}Ca	^{43}Sc	^{44}Ti	^{45}V	^{46}Cr	^{47}Mn	^{48}Fe		^{50}Ni	Cu	30																																																																	
										23		^{34}Na	^{35}Mg	^{36}Al	^{37}Si	^{38}P	^{39}S	^{40}Cl	^{41}Ar	^{42}K	^{43}Ca	^{44}Sc	^{45}Ti	^{46}V	^{47}Cr	^{48}Mn	^{49}Fe	^{50}Co	^{51}Ni		Zn	31																																																																
										24	^{34}Ne	^{35}Na	^{36}Mg	^{37}Al	^{38}Si	^{39}P	^{40}S	^{41}Cl	^{42}Ar	^{43}K	^{44}Ca	^{45}Sc	^{46}Ti	^{47}V	^{48}Cr	^{49}Mn	^{50}Fe	^{51}Co	^{52}Ni		^{54}Zn	Ga	32																																																															
											25		^{37}Mg	^{38}Al	^{39}Si	^{40}P	^{41}S	^{42}Cl	^{43}Ar	^{44}K	^{45}Ca	^{46}Sc	^{47}Ti	^{48}V	^{49}Cr	^{50}Mn	^{51}Fe	^{52}Co	^{53}Ni		^{55}Zn		Ge	33																																																														
											26	^{37}Na	^{38}Mg	^{39}Al	^{40}Si	^{41}P	^{42}S	^{43}Cl	^{44}Ar	^{45}K	^{46}Ca	^{47}Sc	^{48}Ti	^{49}V	^{50}Cr	^{51}Mn	^{52}Fe	^{53}Co	^{54}Ni	^{55}Cu	^{56}Zn			As																																																														
											27			^{40}Al	^{41}Si	^{42}P	^{43}S	^{44}Cl	^{45}Ar	^{46}K	^{47}Ca	^{48}Sc	^{49}Ti	^{50}V	^{51}Cr	^{52}Mn	^{53}Fe	^{54}Co	^{55}Ni	^{56}Cu	^{57}Zn		^{59}Ge		34																																																													
											28	^{39}Na	^{40}Mg	^{41}Al	^{42}Si	^{43}P	^{44}S	^{45}Cl	^{46}Ar	^{47}K	^{48}Ca	^{49}Sc	^{50}Ti	^{51}V	^{52}Cr	^{53}Mn	^{54}Fe	^{55}Co	^{56}Ni	^{57}Cu	^{58}Zn		^{60}Ge		Se	35																																																												
												29		^{42}Al	^{43}Si	^{44}P	^{45}S	^{46}Cl	^{47}Ar	^{48}K	^{49}Ca	^{50}Sc	^{51}Ti	^{52}V	^{53}Cr	^{54}Mn	^{55}Fe	^{56}Co	^{57}Ni	^{58}Cu	^{59}Zn	^{60}Ga	^{61}Ge		^{63}Se	Br	36																																																											
													30	^{43}Al	^{44}Si	^{45}P	^{46}S	^{47}Cl	^{48}Ar	^{49}K	^{50}Ca	^{51}Sc	^{52}Ti	^{53}V	^{54}Cr	^{55}Mn	^{56}Fe	^{57}Co	^{58}Ni	^{59}Cu	^{60}Zn	^{61}Ga	^{62}Ge		^{64}Se		Kr																																																											
														31	^{45}Si	^{46}P	^{47}S	^{48}Cl	^{49}Ar	^{50}K	^{51}Ca	^{52}Sc	^{53}Ti	^{54}V	^{55}Cr	^{56}Mn	^{57}Fe	^{58}Co	^{59}Ni	^{60}Cu	^{61}Zn	^{62}Ga	^{63}Ge	^{64}As	^{65}Se		^{67}Kr																																																											
														32	^{46}Si	^{47}P	^{48}S	^{49}Cl	^{50}Ar	^{51}K	^{52}Ca	^{53}Sc	^{54}Ti	^{55}V	^{56}Cr	^{57}Mn	^{58}Fe	^{59}Co	^{60}Ni	^{61}Cu	^{62}Zn	^{63}Ga	^{64}Ge	^{65}As	^{66}Se		^{68}Kr	37																																																										
																33	^{49}S	^{50}Cl	^{51}Ar	^{52}K	^{53}Ca	^{54}Sc	^{55}Ti	^{56}V	^{57}Cr	^{58}Mn	^{59}Fe	^{60}Co	^{61}Ni	^{62}Cu	^{63}Zn	^{64}Ga	^{65}Ge	^{66}As	^{67}Se	^{68}Br	^{69}Kr	Rb	38																																																									
																	34	^{51}Cl	^{52}Ar	^{53}K	^{54}Ca	^{55}Sc	^{56}Ti	^{57}V	^{58}Cr	^{59}Mn	^{60}Fe	^{61}Co	^{62}Ni	^{63}Cu	^{64}Zn	^{65}Ga	^{66}Ge	^{67}As	^{68}Se	^{69}Br	^{70}Kr		Sr	39																																																								
																	35	^{52}Cl	^{53}Ar	^{54}K	^{55}Ca	^{56}Sc	^{57}Ti	^{58}V	^{59}Cr	^{60}Mn	^{61}Fe	^{62}Co	^{63}Ni	^{64}Cu	^{65}Zn	^{66}Ga	^{67}Ge	^{68}As	^{69}Se	^{70}Br	^{71}Kr	^{72}Rb	^{73}Sr	Y	40																																																							
																		36	^{54}Ar	^{55}K	^{56}Ca	^{57}Sc	^{58}Ti	^{59}V	^{60}Cr	^{61}Mn	^{62}Fe	^{63}Co	^{64}Ni	^{65}Cu	^{66}Zn	^{67}Ga	^{68}Ge	^{69}As	^{70}Se	^{71}Br	^{72}Kr	^{73}Rb	^{74}Sr		Zr	41																																																						
																			37	^{56}K	^{57}Ca	^{58}Sc	^{59}Ti	^{60}V	^{61}Cr	^{62}Mn	^{63}Fe	^{64}Co	^{65}Ni	^{66}Cu	^{67}Zn	^{68}Ga	^{69}Ge	^{70}As	^{71}Se	^{72}Br	^{73}Kr	^{74}Rb	^{75}Sr	^{76}Y	^{77}Zr	Nb	42																																																					
																			38	^{57}K	^{58}Ca	^{59}Sc	^{60}Ti	^{61}V	^{62}Cr	^{63}Mn	^{64}Fe	^{65}Co	^{66}Ni	^{67}Cu	^{68}Zn	^{69}Ga	^{70}Ge	^{71}As	^{72}Se	^{73}Br	^{74}Kr	^{75}Rb	^{76}Sr	^{77}Y	^{78}Zr		Mo	43																																																				
																			39		^{59}Ca	^{60}Sc	^{61}Ti	^{62}V	^{63}Cr	^{64}Mn	^{65}Fe	^{66}Co	^{67}Ni	^{68}Cu	^{69}Zn	^{70}Ga	^{71}Ge	^{72}As	^{73}Se	^{74}Br	^{75}Kr	^{76}Rb	^{77}Sr	^{78}Y	^{79}Zr		^{81}Mo	Tc	44																																																			
																			40	^{59}K	^{60}Ca	^{61}Sc	^{62}Ti	^{63}V	^{64}Cr	^{65}Mn	^{66}Fe	^{67}Co	^{68}Ni	^{69}Cu	^{70}Zn	^{71}Ga	^{72}Ge	^{73}As	^{74}Se	^{75}Br	^{76}Kr	^{77}Rb	^{78}Sr	^{79}Y	^{80}Zr		^{82}Mo		Ru																																																			
																				41		^{62}Sc	^{63}Ti	^{64}V	^{65}Cr	^{66}Mn	^{67}Fe	^{68}Co	^{69}Ni	^{70}Cu	^{71}Zn	^{72}Ga	^{73}Ge	^{74}As	^{75}Se	^{76}Br	^{77}Kr	^{78}Rb	^{79}Sr	^{80}Y	^{81}Zr	^{82}Nb	^{83}Mo		^{85}Ru	45																																																		
																					42	^{63}Sc	^{64}Ti	^{65}V	^{66}Cr	^{67}Mn	^{68}Fe	^{69}Co	^{70}Ni	^{71}Cu	^{72}Zn	^{73}Ga	^{74}Ge	^{75}As	^{76}Se	^{77}Br	^{78}Kr	^{79}Rb	^{80}Sr	^{81}Y	^{82}Zr	^{83}Nb	^{84}Mo		^{86}Ru	Rh	46																																																	
																						43	^{65}Ti	^{66}V	^{67}Cr	^{68}Mn	^{69}Fe	^{70}Co	^{71}Ni	^{72}Cu	^{73}Zn	^{74}Ga	^{75}Ge	^{76}As	^{77}Se	^{78}Br	^{79}Kr	^{80}Rb	^{81}Sr	^{82}Y	^{83}Zr	^{84}Nb	^{85}Mo	^{86}Tc	^{87}Ru		Pd	47																																																
																						44	^{66}Ti	^{67}V	^{68}Cr	^{69}Mn	^{70}Fe	^{71}Co	^{72}Ni	^{73}Cu	^{74}Zn	^{75}Ga	^{76}Ge	^{77}As	^{78}Se	^{79}Br	^{80}Kr	^{81}Rb	^{82}Sr	^{83}Y	^{84}Zr	^{85}Nb	^{86}Mo	^{87}Tc	^{88}Ru	^{89}Rh	^{90}Pd	Ag	48																																															
																							45	^{68}V	^{69}Cr	^{70}Mn	^{71}Fe	^{72}Co	^{73}Ni	^{74}Cu	^{75}Zn	^{76}Ga	^{77}Ge	^{78}As	^{79}Se	^{80}Br	^{81}Kr	^{82}Rb	^{83}Sr	^{84}Y	^{85}Zr	^{86}Nb	^{87}Mo	^{88}Tc	^{89}Ru	^{90}Rh	^{91}Pd	^{92}Ag	Cd	49																																														
																								46	^{70}Cr	^{71}Mn	^{72}Fe	^{73}Co	^{74}Ni	^{75}Cu	^{76}Zn	^{77}Ga	^{78}Ge	^{79}As	^{80}Se	^{81}Br	^{82}Kr	^{83}Rb	^{84}Sr	^{85}Y	^{86}Zr	^{87}Nb	^{88}Mo	^{89}Tc	^{90}Ru	^{91}Rh	^{92}Pd	^{93}Ag	^{94}Cd	In	50																																													
																								47		^{72}Mn	^{73}Fe	^{74}Co	^{75}Ni	^{76}Cu	^{77}Zn	^{78}Ga	^{79}Ge	^{80}As	^{81}Se	^{82}Br	^{83}Kr	^{84}Rb	^{85}Sr	^{86}Y	^{87}Zr	^{88}Nb	^{89}Mo	^{90}Tc	^{91}Ru	^{92}Rh	^{93}Pd	^{94}Ag	^{95}Cd	^{96}In	Sn																																													
																								48	^{72}Cr	^{73}Mn	^{74}Fe	^{75}Co	^{76}Ni	^{77}Cu	^{78}Zn	^{79}Ga	^{80}Ge	^{81}As	^{82}Se	^{83}Br	^{84}Kr	^{85}Rb	^{86}Sr	^{87}Y	^{88}Zr	^{89}Nb	^{90}Mo	^{91}Tc	^{92}Ru	^{93}Rh	^{94}Pd	^{95}Ag	^{96}Cd	^{97}In	^{98}Sn																																													
																									49	^{74}Mn	^{75}Fe	^{76}Co	^{77}Ni	^{78}Cu	^{79}Zn	^{80}Ga	^{81}Ge	^{82}As	^{83}Se	^{84}Br	^{85}Kr	^{86}Rb	^{87}Sr	^{88}Y	^{89}Zr	^{90}Nb	^{91}Mo	^{92}Tc	^{93}Ru	^{94}Rh	^{95}Pd	^{96}Ag	^{97}Cd	^{98}In	^{99}Sn	51																																												
																									50	^{75}Mn	^{76}Fe	^{77}Co	^{78}Ni	^{79}Cu	^{80}Zn	^{81}Ga	^{82}Ge	^{83}As	^{84}Se	^{85}Br	^{86}Kr	^{87}Rb	^{88}Sr	^{89}Y	^{90}Zr	^{91}Nb	^{92}Mo	^{93}Tc	^{94}Ru	^{95}Rh	^{96}Pd	^{97}Ag	^{98}Cd	^{99}In	^{100}Sn	Sb	52																																											
																										51	^{77}Fe	^{78}Co	^{79}Ni	^{80}Cu	^{81}Zn	^{82}Ga	^{83}Ge	^{84}As	^{85}Se	^{86}Br	^{87}Kr	^{88}Rb	^{89}Sr	^{90}Y	^{91}Zr	^{92}Nb	^{93}Mo	^{94}Tc	^{95}Ru	^{96}Rh	^{97}Pd	^{98}Ag	^{99}Cd	^{100}In	^{101}Sn		Te	53																																										
																											52	^{79}Co	^{80}Ni	^{81}Cu	^{82}Zn	^{83}Ga	^{84}Ge	^{85}As	^{86}Se	^{87}Br	^{88}Kr	^{89}Rb	^{90}Sr	^{91}Y	^{92}Zr	^{93}Nb	^{94}Mo	^{95}Tc	^{96}Ru	^{97}Rh	^{98}Pd	^{99}Ag	^{100}Cd	^{101}In	^{102}Sn	^{103}Sb	^{104}Te	I	54																																									
																											53	^{80}Co	^{81}Ni	^{82}Cu	^{83}Zn	^{84}Ga	^{85}Ge	^{86}As	^{87}Se	^{88}Br	^{89}Kr	^{90}Rb	^{91}Sr	^{92}Y	^{93}Zr	^{94}Nb	^{95}Mo	^{96}Tc	^{97}Ru	^{98}Rh	^{99}Pd	^{100}Ag	^{101}Cd	^{102}In	^{103}Sn	^{104}Sb	^{105}Te		Xe																																									
																												54	^{82}Ni	^{83}Cu	^{84}Zn	^{85}Ga	^{86}Ge	^{87}As	^{88}Se	^{89}Br	^{90}Kr	^{91}Rb	^{92}Sr	^{93}Y	^{94}Zr	^{95}Nb	^{96}Mo	^{97}Tc	^{98}Ru	^{99}Rh	^{100}Pd	^{101}Ag	^{102}Cd	^{103}In	^{104}Sn	^{105}Sb	^{106}Te		^{108}Xe	55																																								
																													55	^{84}Cu	^{85}Zn	^{86}Ga	^{87}Ge	^{88}As	^{89}Se	^{90}Br	^{91}Kr	^{92}Rb	^{93}Sr	^{94}Y	^{95}Zr	^{96}Nb	^{97}Mo	^{98}Tc	^{99}Ru	^{100}Rh	^{101}Pd	^{102}Ag	^{103}Cd	^{104}In	^{105}Sn	^{106}Sb	^{107}Te	^{108}I	^{109}Xe	Cs	56																																							
																													56	^{85}Cu	^{86}Zn	^{87}Ga	^{88}Ge	^{89}As	^{90}Se	^{91}Br	^{92}Kr	^{93}Rb	^{94}Sr	^{95}Y	^{96}Zr	^{97}Nb	^{98}Mo	^{99}Tc	^{100}Ru	^{101}Rh	^{102}Pd	^{103}Ag	^{104}Cd	^{105}In	^{106}Sn	^{107}Sb	^{108}Te	^{109}I	^{110}Xe		Ba																																							
																														57	^{87}Zn	^{88}Ga	^{89}Ge	^{90}As	^{91}Se	^{92}Br	^{93}Kr	^{94}Rb	^{95}Sr	^{96}Y	^{97}Zr	^{98}Nb	^{99}Mo	^{100}Tc	^{101}Ru	^{102}Rh	^{103}Pd	^{104}Ag	^{105}Cd	^{106}In	^{107}Sn	^{108}Sb	^{109}Te	^{110}I	^{111}Xe	^{112}Cs		57																																						
																															58	^{89}Ga	^{90}Ge	^{91}As	^{92}Se	^{93}Br	^{94}Kr	^{95}Rb	^{96}Sr	^{97}Y	^{98}Zr	^{99}Nb	^{100}Mo	^{101}Tc	^{102}Ru	^{103}Rh	^{104}Pd	^{105}Ag	^{106}Cd	^{107}In	^{108}Sn	^{109}Sb	^{110}Te	^{111}I	^{112}Xe	^{113}Cs	^{114}Ba	La	58																																					
																															59	^{90}Ga	^{91}Ge	^{92}As	^{93}Se	^{94}Br	^{95}Kr	^{96}Rb	^{97}Sr	^{98}Y	^{99}Zr	^{100}Nb	^{101}Mo	^{102}Tc	^{103}Ru	^{104}Rh	^{105}Pd	^{106}Ag	^{107}Cd	^{108}In	^{109}Sn	^{110}Sb	^{111}Te	^{112}I	^{113}Xe	^{114}Cs	^{115}Ba	^{116}La	Ce	59																																				
																																60	^{92}Ge	^{93}As	^{94}Se	^{95}Br	^{96}Kr	^{97}Rb	^{98}Sr	^{99}Y	^{100}Zr	^{101}Nb	^{102}Mo	^{103}Tc	^{104}Ru	^{105}Rh	^{106}Pd	^{107}Ag	^{108}Cd	^{109}In	^{110}Sn	^{111}Sb	^{112}Te	^{113}I	^{114}Xe	^{115}Cs	^{116}Ba	^{117}La	^{118}Ce	Pr																																				
																																	61	^{94}As	^{95}Se	^{96}Br	^{97}Kr	^{98}Rb	^{99}Sr	^{100}Y	^{101}Zr	^{102}Nb	^{103}Mo	^{104}Tc	^{105}Ru	^{106}Rh	^{107}Pd	^{108}Ag	^{109}Cd	^{110}In	^{111}Sn	^{112}Sb	^{113}Te	^{114}I	^{115}Xe	^{116}Cs	^{117}Ba	^{118}La	^{119}Ce	^{120}Pr	60																																			
																																	62	^{95}As	^{96}Se	^{97}Br	^{98}Kr	^{99}Rb	^{100}Sr	^{101}Y	^{102}Zr	^{103}Nb	^{104}Mo	^{105}Tc	^{106}Ru	^{107}Rh	^{108}Pd	^{109}Ag	^{110}Cd	^{111}In	^{112}Sn	^{113}Sb	^{114}Te	^{115}I	^{116}Xe	^{117}Cs	^{118}Ba	^{119}La	^{120}Ce	^{121}Pr	Nd	61																																		
																																		63	^{97}Se	^{98}Br	^{99}Kr	^{100}Rb	^{101}Sr	^{102}Y	^{103}Zr	^{104}Nb	^{105}Mo	^{106}Tc	^{107}Ru	^{108}Rh	^{109}Pd	^{110}Ag	^{111}Cd	^{112}In	^{113}Sn	^{114}Sb	^{115}Te	^{116}I	^{117}Xe	^{118}Cs	^{119}Ba	^{120}La	^{121}Ce	^{122}Pr	^{123}Nd	Pm																																		
																																			64	^{99}Br	^{100}Kr	^{101}Rb	^{102}Sr	^{103}Y	^{104}Zr	^{105}Nb	^{106}Mo	^{107}Tc	^{108}Ru	^{109}Rh	^{110}Pd	^{111}Ag	^{112}Cd	^{113}In	^{114}Sn	^{115}Sb	^{116}Te	^{117}I	^{118}Xe	^{119}Cs	^{120}Ba	^{121}La	^{122}Ce	^{123}Pr	^{124}Nd	^{125}Pm	62																																	
																																			65	^{100}Br	^{101}Kr	^{102}Rb	^{103}Sr	^{104}Y	^{105}Zr	^{106}Nb	^{107}Mo	^{108}Tc	^{109}Ru	^{110}Rh	^{111}Pd	^{112}Ag	^{113}Cd	^{114}In	^{115}Sn	^{116}Sb	^{117}Te	^{118}I	^{119}Xe	^{120}Cs	^{121}Ba	^{122}La	^{123}Ce	^{124}Pr	^{125}Nd	^{126}Pm	Sm	63																																
																																			66	^{101}Br	^{102}Kr	^{103}Rb	^{104}Sr	^{105}Y	^{106}Zr	^{107}Nb	^{108}Mo	^{109}Tc	^{110}Ru	^{111}Rh	^{112}Pd	^{113}Ag	^{114}Cd	^{115}In	^{116}Sn	^{117}Sb	^{118}Te	^{119}I	^{120}Xe	^{121}Cs	^{122}Ba	^{123}La	^{124}Ce	^{125}Pr	^{126}Nd	^{127}Pm	^{128}Sm	Eu																																
																																				67	^{103}Kr	^{104}Rb	^{105}Sr	^{106}Y	^{107}Zr	^{108}Nb	^{109}Mo	^{110}Tc	^{111}Ru	^{112}Rh	^{113}Pd	^{114}Ag	^{115}Cd	^{116}In	^{117}Sn	^{118}Sb	^{119}Te	^{120}I	^{121}Xe	^{122}Cs	^{123}Ba	^{124}La	^{125}Ce	^{126}Pr	^{127}Nd	^{128}Pm	^{129}Sm	^{130}Eu	64																															
																																					68	^{105}Rb	^{106}Sr	^{107}Y	^{108}Zr	^{109}Nb	^{110}Mo	^{111}Tc	^{112}Ru	^{113}Rh	^{114}Pd	^{115}Ag	^{116}Cd	^{117}In	^{118}Sn	^{119}Sb	^{120}Te	^{121}I	^{122}Xe	^{123}Cs	^{124}Ba	^{125}La	^{126}Ce	^{127}Pr	^{128}Nd	^{129}Pm	^{130}Sm	^{131}Eu	Gd	65																														
																																					69	^{106}Rb	^{107}Sr	^{108}Y	^{109}Zr	^{110}Nb	^{111}Mo	^{112}Tc	^{113}Ru	^{114}Rh	^{115}Pd	^{116}Ag	^{117}Cd	^{118}In	^{119}Sn	^{120}Sb	^{121}Te	^{122}I	^{123}Xe	^{124}Cs	^{125}Ba	^{126}La	^{127}Ce	^{128}Pr	^{129}Nd	^{130}Pm	^{131}Sm	^{132}Eu	^{133}Gd	Tb																														
																																						70	^{108}Sr	^{109}Y	^{110}Zr	^{111}Nb	^{112}Mo	^{113}Tc	^{114}Ru	^{115}Rh	^{116}Pd	^{117}Ag	^{118}Cd	^{119}In	^{120}Sn	^{121}Sb	^{122}Te	^{123}I	^{124}Xe	^{125}Cs	^{126}Ba	^{127}La	^{128}Ce	^{129}Pr	^{130}Nd	^{131}Pm	^{132}Sm	^{133}Eu	^{134}Gd	^{135}Tb	66																													
																																							71	^{110}Y	^{111}Zr	^{112}Nb	^{113}Mo	^{114}Tc	^{115}Ru	^{116}Rh	^{117}Pd	^{118}Ag	^{119}Cd	^{120}In	^{121}Sn	^{122}Sb	^{123}Te	^{124}I	^{125}Xe	^{126}Cs	^{127}Ba	^{128}La	^{129}Ce	^{130}Pr	^{131}Nd	^{132}Pm	^{133}Sm	^{134}Eu	^{135}Gd	^{136}Tb	Dy	67																												
																																							72	^{111}Y	^{112}Zr	^{113}Nb	^{114}Mo	^{115}Tc	^{116}Ru	^{117}Rh	^{118}Pd	^{119}Ag	^{120}Cd	^{121}In	^{122}Sn	^{123}Sb	^{124}Te	^{125}I	^{126}Xe	^{127}Cs	^{128}Ba	^{129}La	^{130}Ce	^{131}Pr	^{132}Nd	^{133}Pm	^{134}Sm	^{135}Eu	^{136}Gd	^{137}Tb	^{138}Dy	Ho	68																											
																																								73	^{113}Zr	^{114}Nb	^{115}Mo	^{116}Tc	^{117}Ru	^{118}Rh	^{119}Pd	^{120}Ag	^{121}Cd	^{122}In	^{123}Sn	^{124}Sb	^{125}Te	^{126}I	^{127}Xe	^{128}Cs	^{129}Ba	^{130}La	^{131}Ce	^{132}Pr	^{133}Nd	^{134}Pm	^{135}Sm	^{136}Eu	^{137}Gd	^{138}Tb	^{139}Dy	^{140}Ho	Er	69																										
																																									74	^{115}Nb	^{116}Mo	^{117}Tc	^{118}Ru	^{119}Rh	^{120}Pd	^{121}Ag	^{122}Cd	^{123}In	^{124}Sn	^{125}Sb	^{126}Te	^{127}I	^{128}Xe	^{129}Cs	^{130}Ba	^{131}La	^{132}Ce	^{133}Pr	^{134}Nd	^{135}Pm	^{136}Sm	^{137}Eu	^{138}Gd	^{139}Tb	^{140}Dy	^{141}Ho		Tm																										
																																									75	^{116}Nb	^{117}Mo	^{118}Tc	^{119}Ru	^{120}Rh	^{121}Pd	^{122}Ag	^{123}Cd	^{124}In	^{125}Sn	^{126}Sb	^{127}Te	^{128}I	^{129}Xe	^{130}Cs	^{131}Ba	^{132}La	^{133}Ce	^{134}Pr	^{135}Nd	^{136}Pm	^{137}Sm	^{138}Eu	^{139}Gd	^{140}Tb	^{141}Dy	^{142}Ho	^{143}Er	^{144}Tm	70																									
																																									76	^{117}Nb	^{118}Mo	^{119}Tc	^{120}Ru	^{121}Rh	^{122}Pd	^{123}Ag	^{124}Cd	^{125}In	^{126}Sn	^{127}Sb	^{128}Te	^{129}I	^{130}Xe	^{131}Cs	^{132}Ba	^{133}La	^{134}Ce	^{135}Pr	^{136}Nd	^{137}Pm	^{138}Sm	^{139}Eu	^{140}Gd	^{141}Tb	^{142}Dy	^{143}Ho	^{144}Er	^{145}Tm	Yb																									
																																										77	^{119}Mo	^{120}Tc	^{121}Ru	^{122}Rh	^{123}Pd	^{124}Ag	^{125}Cd	^{126}In	^{127}Sn	^{128}Sb	^{129}Te	^{130}I	^{131}Xe	^{132}Cs	^{133}Ba	^{134}La	^{135}Ce	^{136}Pr	^{137}Nd	^{138}Pm	^{139}Sm	^{140}Eu	^{141}Gd	^{142}Tb	^{143}Dy	^{144}Ho	^{145}Er	^{146}Tm	^{147}Yb	71																								
																																											78	^{121}Tc	^{122}Ru	^{123}Rh	^{124}Pd	^{125}Ag	^{126}Cd	^{127}In	^{128}Sn	^{129}Sb	^{130}Te	^{131}I	^{132}Xe	^{133}Cs	^{134}Ba	^{135}La	^{136}Ce	^{137}Pr	^{138}Nd	^{139}Pm	^{140}Sm	^{141}Eu	^{142}Gd	^{143}Tb	^{144}Dy	^{145}Ho	^{146}Er	^{147}Tm	^{148}Yb	Lu	72																							
																																											79	^{122}Tc	^{123}Ru	^{124}Rh	^{125}Pd	^{126}Ag	^{127}Cd	^{128}In	^{129}Sn	^{130}Sb	^{131}Te	^{132}I	^{133}Xe	^{134}Cs	^{135}Ba	^{136}La	^{137}Ce	^{138}Pr	^{139}Nd	^{140}Pm	^{141}Sm	^{142}Eu	^{143}Gd	^{144}Tb	^{145}Dy	^{146}Ho	^{147}Er	^{148}Tm	^{149}Yb	^{150}Lu	Hf	73																						
																																												80	^{124}Ru	^{125}Rh	^{126}Pd	^{127}Ag	^{128}Cd	^{129}In	^{130}Sn	^{131}Sb	^{132}Te	^{133}I	^{134}Xe	^{135}Cs	^{136}Ba	^{137}La	^{138}Ce	^{139}Pr	^{140}Nd	^{141}Pm	^{142}Sm	^{143}Eu	^{144}Gd	^{145}Tb	^{146}Dy	^{147}Ho	^{148}Er	^{149}Tm	^{150}Yb	^{151}Lu	^{152}Hf	Ta	74																					
																																												81	^{125}Ru	^{126}Rh	^{127}Pd	^{128}Ag	^{129}Cd	^{130}In	^{131}Sn	^{132}Sb	^{133}Te	^{134}I	^{135}Xe	^{136}Cs	^{137}Ba	^{138}La	^{139}Ce	^{140}Pr	^{141}Nd	^{142}Pm	^{143}Sm	^{144}Eu	^{145}Gd	^{146}Tb	^{147}Dy	^{148}Ho	^{149}Er	^{150}Tm	^{151}Yb	^{152}Lu	^{153}Hf	^{154}Ta	W																					
																																													82	^{127}Rh	^{128}Pd	^{129}Ag	^{130}Cd	^{131}In	^{132}Sn	^{133}Sb	^{134}Te	^{135}I	^{136}Xe	^{137}Cs	^{138}Ba	^{139}La	^{140}Ce	^{141}Pr	^{142}Nd	^{143}Pm	^{144}Sm	^{145}Eu	^{146}Gd	^{147}Tb	^{148}Dy	^{149}Ho	^{150}Er	^{151}Tm	^{152}Yb	^{153}Lu	^{154}Hf	^{155}Ta	^{156}W	75	76																			
																																													83	^{128}Rh	^{129}Pd	^{130}Ag	^{131}Cd	^{132}In	^{133}Sn	^{134}Sb	^{135}Te	^{136}I	^{137}Xe	^{138}Cs	^{139}Ba	^{140}La	^{141}Ce	^{142}Pr	^{143}Nd	^{144}Pm	^{145}Sm	^{146}Eu	^{147}Gd	^{148}Tb	^{149}Dy	^{150}Ho	^{151}Er	^{152}Tm	^{153}Yb	^{154}Lu	^{155}Hf	^{156}Ta	^{157}W	Re	Os																			
																																														84	^{130}Pd	^{131}Ag	^{132}Cd	^{133}In	^{134}Sn	^{135}Sb	^{136}Te	^{137}I	^{138}Xe	^{139}Cs	^{140}Ba	^{141}La	^{142}Ce	^{143}Pr	^{144}Nd	^{145}Pm	^{146}Sm	^{147}Eu	^{148}Gd	^{149}Tb	^{150}Dy	^{151}Ho	^{152}Er	^{153}Tm	^{154}Yb	^{155}Lu	^{156}Hf	^{157}Ta	^{158}W	^{159}Re	^{160}Os	77																		
																																														85	^{131}Pd	^{132}Ag	^{133}Cd	^{134}In	^{135}Sn	^{136}Sb	^{137}Te	^{138}I	^{139}Xe	^{140}Cs	^{141}Ba	^{142}La	^{143}Ce	^{144}Pr	^{145}Nd	^{146}Pm	^{147}Sm	^{148}Eu	^{149}Gd	^{150}Tb	^{151}Dy	^{152}Ho	^{153}Er	^{154}Tm	^{155}Yb	^{156}Lu	^{157}Hf	^{158}Ta	^{159}W	^{160}Re	^{161}Os	Ir	78																	
																																															86		^{134}Cd	^{135}In	^{136}Sn	^{137}Sb	^{138}Te	^{139}I	^{140}Xe	^{141}Cs	^{142}Ba	^{143}La	^{144}Ce	^{145}Pr	^{146}Nd	^{147}Pm	^{148}Sm	^{149}Eu	^{150}Gd	^{151}Tb	^{152}Dy	^{153}Ho	^{154}Er	^{155}Tm	^{156}Yb	^{157}Lu	^{158}Hf	^{159}Ta	^{160}W	^{161}Re	^{162}Os		Pt																	
																																																87		^{136}In	^{137}Sn	^{138}Sb	^{139}Te	^{140}I	^{141}Xe	^{142}Cs	^{143}Ba	^{144}La	^{145}Ce	^{146}Pr	^{147}Nd	^{148}Pm	^{149}Sm	^{150}Eu	^{151}Gd	^{152}Tb	^{153}Dy	^{154}Ho	^{155}Er	^{156}Tm	^{157}Yb	^{158}Lu	^{159}Hf	^{160}Ta	^{161}W	^{162}Re	^{163}Os		^{165}Pt	79																
																																																	88	^{137}In	^{138}Sn	^{139}Sb	^{140}Te	^{141}I	^{142}Xe	^{143}Cs	^{144}Ba	^{145}La	^{146}Ce	^{147}Pr	^{148}Nd	^{149}Pm	^{150}Sm	^{151}Eu	^{152}Gd	^{153}Tb	^{154}Dy	^{155}Ho	^{156}Er	^{157}Tm	^{158}Yb	^{159}Lu	^{160}Hf	^{161}Ta	^{162}W	^{163}Re	^{164}Os	^{165}Ir	^{166}Pt	Au	80															
																																																		89	^{139}Sn	^{140}Sb	^{141}Te	^{142}I	^{143}Xe	^{144}Cs	^{145}Ba	^{146}La	^{147}Ce	^{148}Pr	^{149}Nd	^{150}Pm	^{151}Sm	^{152}Eu	^{153}Gd	^{154}Tb	^{155}Dy	^{156}Ho	^{157}Er	^{158}Tm	^{159}Yb	^{160}Lu	^{161}Hf	^{162}Ta	^{163}W	^{164}Re	^{165}Os	^{166}Ir	^{167}Pt		Hg															
																																																		90	^{140}Sn	^{141}Sb	^{142}Te	^{143}I	^{144}Xe	^{145}Cs	^{146}Ba	^{147}La	^{148}Ce	^{149}Pr	^{150}Nd	^{151}Pm	^{152}Sm	^{153}Eu	^{154}Gd	^{155}Tb	^{156}Dy	^{157}Ho	^{158}Er	^{159}Tm	^{160}Yb	^{161}Lu	^{162}Hf	^{163}Ta	^{164}W	^{165}Re	^{166}Os	^{167}Ir	^{168}Pt		^{170}Hg															
																																																			91	^{142}Sb	^{143}Te	^{144}I	^{145}Xe	^{146}Cs	^{147}Ba	^{148}La	^{149}Ce	^{150}Pr	^{151}Nd	^{152}Pm	^{153}Sm	^{154}Eu	^{155}Gd	^{156}Tb	^{157}Dy	^{158}Ho	^{159}Er	^{160}Tm	^{161}Yb	^{162}Lu	^{163}Hf	^{164}Ta	^{165}W	^{166}Re	^{167}Os	^{168}Ir	^{169}Pt	^{170}Au	^{171}Hg															
																																																				92	^{144}Te	^{145}I	^{146}Xe	^{147}Cs	^{148}Ba	^{149}La	^{150}Ce	^{151}Pr	^{152}Nd	^{153}Pm	^{154}Sm	^{155}Eu	^{156}Gd	^{157}Tb	^{158}Dy	^{159}Ho	^{160}Er	^{161}Tm	^{162}Yb	^{163}Lu	^{164}Hf	^{165}Ta	^{166}W	^{167}Re	^{168}Os	^{169}Ir	^{170}Pt	^{171}Au	^{172}Hg															
																																																				93	^{145}Te	^{146}I	^{147}Xe	^{148}Cs	^{149}Ba	^{150}La	^{151}Ce	^{152}Pr	^{153}Nd	^{154}Pm	^{155}Sm	^{156}Eu	^{157}Gd	^{158}Tb	^{159}Dy	^{160}Ho	^{161}Er	^{162}Tm	^{163}Yb	^{164}Lu	^{165}Hf	^{166}Ta	^{167}W	^{168}Re	^{169}Os	^{170}Ir	^{171}Pt	^{172}Au	^{173}Hg	81														
																																																					94	^{147}I	^{148}Xe	^{149}Cs	^{150}Ba	^{151}La	^{152}Ce	^{153}Pr	^{154}Nd	^{155}Pm	^{156}Sm	^{157}Eu	^{158}Gd	^{159}Tb	^{160}Dy	^{161}Ho	^{162}Er	^{163}Tm	^{164}Yb	^{165}Lu	^{166}Hf	^{167}Ta	^{168}W	^{169}Re	^{170}Os	^{171}Ir	^{172}Pt	^{173}Au	^{174}Hg	Tl	82													
																																																						95	^{149}Xe	^{150}Cs	^{151}Ba	^{152}La	^{153}Ce	^{154}Pr	^{155}Nd	^{156}Pm	^{157}Sm	^{158}Eu	^{159}Gd	^{160}Tb	^{161}Dy	^{162}Ho	^{163}Er	^{164}Tm	^{165}Yb	^{166}Lu	^{167}Hf	^{168}Ta	^{169}W	^{170}Re	^{171}Os	^{172}Ir	^{173}Pt	^{174}Au	^{175}Hg	^{176}Tl	Pb													
																																																						96	^{150}Xe	^{151}Cs	^{152}Ba	^{153}La	^{154}Ce	^{155}Pr	^{156}Nd	^{157}Pm	^{158}Sm	^{159}Eu	^{160}Gd	^{161}Tb	^{162}Dy	^{163}Ho	^{164}Er	^{165}Tm	^{166}Yb	^{167}Lu	^{168}Hf	^{169}Ta	^{170}W	^{171}Re	^{172}Os	^{173}Ir	^{174}Pt	^{175}Au	^{176}Hg	^{177}Tl	^{178}Pb													
																																																							97	^{152}Cs	^{153}Ba	^{154}La	^{155}Ce	^{156}Pr	^{157}Nd	^{158}Pm	^{159}Sm	^{160}Eu	^{161}Gd	^{162}Tb	^{163}Dy	^{164}Ho	^{165}Er	^{166}Tm	^{167}Yb	^{168}Lu	^{169}Hf	^{170}Ta	^{171}W	^{172}Re	^{173}Os	^{174}Ir	^{175}Pt	^{176}Au	^{177}Hg	^{178}Tl	^{179}Pb													
																																																								98	^{154}Ba	^{155}La	^{156}Ce	^{157}Pr	^{158}Nd	^{159}Pm	^{160}Sm	^{161}Eu	^{162}Gd	^{163}Tb	^{164}Dy	^{165}Ho	^{166}Er	^{167}Tm	^{168}Yb	^{169}Lu	^{170}Hf	^{171}Ta	^{172}W	^{173}Re	^{174}Os	^{175}Ir	^{176}Pt	^{177}Au	^{178}Hg	^{179}Tl	^{180}Pb													
																																																								99	^{155}Ba	^{156}La	^{157}Ce	^{158}Pr	^{159}Nd	^{160}Pm	^{161}Sm	^{162}Eu	^{163}Gd	^{164}Tb	^{165}Dy	^{166}Ho	^{167}Er	^{168}Tm	^{169}Yb	^{170}Lu	^{171}Hf	^{172}Ta	^{173}W	^{174}Re	^{175}Os	^{176}Ir	^{177}Pt	^{178}Au	^{179}Hg	^{180}Tl	^{181}Pb	83												
																																																									100	^{157}La	^{158}Ce	^{159}Pr	^{160}Nd	^{161}Pm	^{162}Sm	^{163}Eu	^{164}Gd	^{165}Tb	^{166}Dy	^{167}Ho	^{168}Er	^{169}Tm	^{170}Yb	^{171}Lu	^{172}Hf	^{173}Ta	^{174}W	^{175}Re	^{176}Os	^{177}Ir	^{178}Pt	^{179}Au	^{180}Hg	^{181}Tl	^{182}Pb	Bi	84											
																																																									101	^{158}La	^{159}Ce	^{160}Pr	^{161}Nd	^{162}Pm	^{163}Sm	^{164}Eu	^{165}Gd	^{166}Tb	^{167}Dy	^{168}Ho	^{169}Er	^{170}Tm	^{171}Yb	^{172}Lu	^{173}Hf	^{174}Ta	^{175}W	^{176}Re	^{177}Os	^{178}Ir	^{179}Pt	^{180}Au	^{181}Hg	^{182}Tl	^{183}Pb	^{184}Bi	Po	85										
																																																										102	^{160}Ce	^{161}Pr	^{162}Nd	^{163}Pm	^{164}Sm	^{165}Eu	^{166}Gd	^{167}Tb	^{168}Dy	^{169}Ho	^{170}Er	^{171}Tm	^{172}Yb	^{173}Lu	^{174}Hf	^{175}Ta	^{176}W	^{177}Re	^{178}Os	^{179}Ir	^{180}Pt	^{181}Au	^{182}Hg	^{183}Tl	^{184}Pb	^{185}Bi	^{186}Po	At										
																																																												103	^{163}Nd	^{164}Pm	^{165}Sm	^{166}Eu	^{167}Gd	^{168}Tb	^{169}Dy	^{170}Ho	^{171}Er	^{172}Tm	^{173}Yb	^{174}Lu	^{175}Hf	^{176}Ta	^{177}W	^{178}Re	^{179}Os	^{180}Ir	^{181}Pt	^{182}Au	^{183}Hg	^{184}Tl	^{185}Pb	^{186}Bi	^{187}Po	^{188}At										
																																																													104	^{165}Pm	^{166}Sm	^{167}Eu	^{168}Gd	^{169}Tb	^{170}Dy	^{171}Ho	^{172}Er	^{173}Tm	^{174}Yb	^{175}Lu	^{176}Hf	^{177}Ta	^{178}W	^{179}Re	^{180}Os	^{181}Ir	^{182}Pt	^{183}Au	^{184}Hg	^{185}Tl	^{186}Pb	^{187}Bi	^{188}Po											
																																																													105	^{166}Pm	^{167}Sm	^{168}Eu	^{169}Gd	^{170}Tb	^{171}Dy	^{172}Ho	^{173}Er	^{174}Tm	^{175}Yb	^{176}Lu	^{177}Hf	^{178}Ta	^{179}W	^{180}Re	^{181}Os	^{182}Ir	^{183}Pt	^{184}Au	^{185}Hg	^{186}Tl	^{187}Pb	^{188}Bi	^{189}Po	^{190}At	86									
																																																														106	^{168}Sm	^{169}Eu	^{170}Gd	^{171}Tb	^{172}Dy	^{173}Ho	^{174}Er	^{175}Tm	^{176}Yb	^{177}Lu	^{178}Hf	^{179}Ta	^{180}W	^{181}Re	^{182}Os	^{183}Ir	^{184}Pt	^{185}Au	^{186}Hg	^{187}Tl	^{188}Pb	^{189}Bi	^{190}Po	^{191}At	Rn									
																																																															107	^{170}Eu	^{171}Gd	^{172}Tb	^{173}Dy	^{174}Ho	^{175}Er	^{176}Tm	^{177}Yb	^{178}Lu	^{179}Hf	^{180}Ta	^{181}W	^{182}Re	^{183}Os	^{184}Ir	^{185}Pt	^{186}Au	^{187}Hg	^{188}Tl	^{189}Pb	^{190}Bi	^{191}Po	^{192}At	^{193}Rn									
																																																																108	^{172}Gd	^{173}Tb	^{174}Dy	^{175}Ho	^{176}Er	^{177}Tm	^{178}Yb	^{179}Lu	^{180}Hf	^{181}Ta	^{182}W	^{183}Re	^{184}Os	^{185}Ir	^{186}Pt	^{187}Au	^{188}Hg	^{189}Tl	^{190}Pb	^{191}Bi	^{192}Po	^{193}At	^{194}Rn	87								
																																																																109	^{173}Gd	^{174}Tb	^{175}Dy	^{176}Ho	^{177}Er	^{178}Tm	^{179}Yb	^{180}Lu	^{181}Hf	^{182}Ta	^{183}W	^{184}Re	^{185}Os	^{186}Ir	^{187}Pt	^{188}Au	^{189}Hg	^{190}Tl	^{191}Pb	^{192}Bi	^{193}Po	^{194}At	^{195}Rn	Fr								
																																																																	110	^{175}Tb	^{176}Dy	^{177}Ho	^{178}Er	^{179}Tm	^{180}Yb	^{181}Lu	^{182}Hf	^{183}Ta	^{184}W	^{185}Re	^{186}Os	^{187}Ir	^{188}Pt	^{189}Au	^{190}Hg	^{191}Tl	^{192}Pb	^{193}Bi	^{194}Po	^{195}At	^{196}Rn	^{197}Fr								
																																																																			111	^{178}Ho	^{179}Er	^{180}Tm	^{181}Yb	^{182}Lu	^{183}Hf	^{184}Ta	^{185}W	^{186}Re	^{187}Os	^{188}Ir	^{189}Pt	^{190}Au	^{191}Hg	^{192}Tl	^{193}Pb	^{194}Bi	^{195}Po	^{196}At	^{197}Rn	^{198}Fr	88							
																																																																			112	^{179}Ho	^{180}Er	^{181}Tm	^{182}Yb	^{183}Lu	^{184}Hf	^{185}Ta	^{186}W	^{187}Re	^{188}Os	^{189}Ir	^{190}Pt	^{191}Au	^{192}Hg	^{193}Tl	^{194}Pb	^{195}Bi	^{196}Po	^{197}At	^{198}Rn	^{199}Fr	Ra	89						
																																																																				113	^{181}Er	^{182}Tm	^{183}Yb	^{184}Lu	^{185}Hf	^{186}Ta	^{187}W	^{188}Re	^{189}Os	^{190}Ir	^{191}Pt	^{192}Au	^{193}Hg	^{194}Tl	^{195}Pb	^{196}Bi	^{197}Po	^{198}At	^{199}Rn	^{200}Fr	^{201}Ra	Ac						
																																																																				114	^{182}Er	^{183}Tm	^{184}Yb	^{185}Lu	^{186}Hf	^{187}Ta	^{188}W	^{189}Re	^{190}Os	^{191}Ir	^{192}Pt	^{193}Au	^{194}Hg	^{195}Tl	^{196}Pb	^{197}Bi	^{198}Po	^{199}At	^{200}Rn	^{201}Fr	^{202}Ra	^{203}Ac						
																																																																					115	^{184}Tm	^{185}Yb	^{186}Lu	^{187}Hf	^{188}Ta	^{189}W	^{190}Re	^{191}Os	^{192}Ir	^{193}Pt	^{194}Au	^{195}Hg	^{196}Tl	^{197}Pb	^{198}Bi	^{199}Po	^{200}At	^{201}Rn	^{202}Fr	^{203}Ra	^{204}Ac	90					
																																																																					116	^{185}Tm	^{186}Yb	^{187}Lu	^{188}Hf	^{189}Ta	^{190}W	^{191}Re	^{192}Os	^{193}Ir	^{194}Pt	^{195}Au	^{196}Hg	^{197}Tl	^{198}Pb	^{199}Bi	^{200}Po	^{201}At	^{202}Rn	^{203}Fr	^{204}Ra	^{205}Ac	Th					
																																																																					117	^{186}Tm	^{187}Yb	^{188}Lu	^{189}Hf	^{190}Ta	^{191}W	^{192}Re	^{193}Os	^{194}Ir	^{195}Pt	^{196}Au	^{197}Hg	^{198}Tl	^{199}Pb	^{200}Bi	^{201}Po	^{202}At	^{203}Rn	^{204}Fr	^{205}Ra	^{206}Ac	^{207}Th	91				
																																																																						118	^{188}Yb	^{189}Lu	^{190}Hf	^{191}Ta	^{192}W	^{193}Re	^{194}Os	^{195}Ir	^{196}Pt	^{197}Au	^{198}Hg	^{199}Tl	^{200}Pb	^{201}Bi	^{202}Po	^{203}At	^{204}Rn	^{205}Fr	^{206}Ra	^{207}Ac	^{208}Th	Pa				
																																																																						119	^{189}Yb	^{190}Lu	^{191}Hf	^{192}Ta	^{193}W	^{194}Re	^{195}Os	^{196}Ir	^{197}Pt	^{198}Au	^{199}Hg	^{200}Tl	^{201}Pb	^{202}Bi	^{203}Po	^{204}At	^{205}Rn	^{206}Fr	^{207}Ra	^{208}Ac	^{209}Th	^{210}Pa				
																																																																							120	^{191}Lu	^{192}Hf	^{193}Ta	^{194}W	^{195}Re	^{196}Os	^{197}Ir	^{198}Pt	^{199}Au	^{200}Hg	^{201}Tl	^{202}Pb	^{203}Bi	^{204}Po	^{205}At	^{206}Rn	^{207}Fr	^{208}Ra	^{209}Ac	^{210}Th	^{211}Pa	92			
																																																																								121	^{193}Hf	^{194}Ta	^{195}W	^{196}Re	^{197}Os	^{198}Ir	^{199}Pt	^{200}Au	^{201}Hg	^{202}Tl	^{203}Pb	^{204}Bi	^{205}Po	^{206}At	^{207}Rn	^{208}Fr	^{209}Ra	^{210}Ac	^{211}Th	^{212}Pa	U			
																																																																								122	^{194}Hf	^{195}Ta	^{196}W	^{197}Re	^{198}Os	^{199}Ir	^{200}Pt	^{201}Au	^{202}Hg	^{203}Tl	^{204}Pb	^{205}Bi	^{206}Po	^{207}At	^{208}Rn	^{209}Fr	^{210}Ra	^{211}Ac	^{212}Th	^{213}Pa	^{214}U			
																																																																									123	^{196}Ta	^{197}W	^{198}Re	^{199}Os	^{200}Ir	^{201}Pt	^{202}Au	^{203}Hg	^{204}Tl	^{205}Pb	^{206}Bi	^{207}Po	^{208}At	^{209}Rn	^{210}Fr	^{211}Ra	^{212}Ac	^{213}Th	^{214}Pa	^{215}U			
																																																																										124	^{198}W	^{199}Re	^{200}Os	^{201}Ir	^{202}Pt	^{203}Au	^{204}Hg	^{205}Tl	^{206}Pb	^{207}Bi	^{208}Po	^{209}At	^{210}Rn	^{211}Fr	^{212}Ra	^{213}Ac	^{214}Th	^{215}Pa	^{216}U	93		
																																																																										125	^{199}W	^{200}Re	^{201}Os	^{202}Ir	^{203}Pt	^{204}Au	^{205}Hg	^{206}Tl	^{207}Pb	^{208}Bi	^{209}Po	^{210}At	^{211}Rn	^{212}Fr	^{213}Ra	^{214}Ac	^{215}Th	^{216}Pa	^{217}U	Np	94	
																																																																											126	^{201}Re	^{202}Os	^{203}Ir	^{204}Pt	^{205}Au	^{206}Hg	^{207}Tl	^{208}Pb	^{209}Bi	^{210}Po	^{211}At	^{212}Rn	^{213}Fr	^{214}Ra	^{215}Ac	^{216}Th	^{217}Pa	^{218}U	^{219}Np	Pu	95
																																																																127	^{203}Os	^{204}Ir	^{205}Pt	^{206}Au	^{207}Hg	^{208}Tl	^{209}Pb	^{210}Bi	^{211}Po	^{212}At	^{213}Rn	^{214}Fr	^{215}Ra	^{216}Ac	^{217}Th	^{218}Pa	^{219}U	^{220}Np		Am												
																																																																	128	^{205}Ir	^{206}Pt	^{207}Au	^{208}Hg	^{209}Tl	^{210}Pb	^{211}Bi	^{212}Po	^{213}At	^{214}Rn	^{215}Fr	^{216}Ra	^{217}Ac	^{218}Th	^{219}Pa																
																																																																		129	^{207}Pt	^{208}Au	^{209}Hg	^{210}Tl	^{211}Pb	^{212}Bi	^{213}Po	^{214}At	^{215}Rn	^{216}Fr	^{217}Ra	^{218}Ac	^{219}Th	^{220}Pa	^{221}U	^{222}Np														
																																																																		130	^{208}Pt	^{209}Au	^{210}Hg	^{211}Tl	^{212}Pb	^{213}Bi	^{214}Po	^{215}At	^{216}Rn	^{217}Fr	^{218}Ra	^{219}Ac	^{220}Th	^{221}Pa	^{222}U	^{223}Np														
																																																																			131	^{210}Au	^{211}Hg	^{212}Tl	^{213}Pb	^{214}Bi	^{215}Po	^{216}At	^{217}Rn	^{218}Fr	^{219}Ra	^{220}Ac	^{221}Th	^{222}Pa	^{223}U	^{224}Np			96	97										
																																																																				132	^{212}Hg	^{213}Tl	^{214}Pb	^{215}Bi	^{216}Po	^{217}At	^{218}Rn	^{219}Fr	^{220}Ra	^{221}Ac	^{222}Th	^{223}Pa	^{224}U	^{225}Np	^{226}Pu		Cm	Bk										
																																																																				133	^{213}Hg	^{214}Tl	^{215}Pb	^{216}Bi	^{217}Po	^{218}At	^{219}Rn	^{220}Fr	^{221}Ra	^{222}Ac	^{223}Th	^{224}Pa	^{225}U	^{226}Np	^{227}Pu													
																																																																				134	^{214}Hg	^{215}Tl	^{216}Pb	^{217}Bi	^{218}Po	^{219}At	^{220}Rn	^{221}Fr	^{222}Ra	^{223}Ac	^{224}Th	^{225}Pa	^{226}U	^{227}Np	^{228}Pu	^{229}Am												
																																																																				135	^{215}Hg	^{216}Tl	^{217}Pb	^{218}Bi	^{219}Po	^{220}At	^{221}Rn	^{222}Fr	^{223}Ra	^{224}Ac	^{225}Th	^{226}Pa	^{227}U	^{228}Np	^{229}Pu	^{230}Am												
																																																																				136	^{216}Hg	^{217}Tl	^{218}Pb	^{219}Bi	^{220}Po	^{221}At	^{222}Rn	^{223}Fr	^{224}Ra	^{225}Ac	^{226}Th	^{227}Pa	^{228}U	^{229}Np	^{230}Pu	^{231}Am		^{233}Bk										
																																																																					137		^{219}Pb	^{220}Bi	^{221}Po	^{222}At	^{223}Rn	^{224}Fr	^{225}Ra	^{226}Ac	^{227}Th	^{228}Pa	^{229}U	^{230}Np	^{231}Pu	^{232}Am	^{233}Cm	^{234}Bk	98									
																																																																						138	^{220}Pb	^{221}Bi	^{222}Po	^{223}At	^{224}Rn	^{225}Fr	^{226}Ra	^{227}Ac	^{228}Th	^{229}Pa	^{230}U	^{231}Np	^{232}Pu	^{233}Am	^{234}Cm	^{235}Bk	Cf	99								
																																																																							139	^{222}Bi	^{223}Po	^{224}At	^{225}Rn	^{226}Fr	^{227}Ra	^{228}Ac	^{229}Th	^{230}Pa	^{231}U	^{232}Np	^{233}Pu	^{234}Am	^{235}Cm	^{236}Bk	^{237}Cf	Es	100							
																																																																							140	^{223}Bi	^{224}Po	^{225}At	^{226}Rn	^{227}Fr	^{228}Ra	^{229}Ac	^{230}Th	^{231}Pa	^{232}U	^{233}Np	^{234}Pu	^{235}Am	^{236}Cm		^{238}Cf		Fm							
																																																																							141	^{224}Bi	^{225}Po	^{226}At	^{227}Rn	^{228}Fr	^{229}Ra	^{230}Ac	^{231}Th	^{232}Pa	^{233}U	^{234}Np	^{235}Pu	^{236}Am	^{237}Cm	^{238}Bk	^{239}Cf	^{240}Es	^{241}Fm	101						
																																																																								142	^{226}Po	^{227}At	^{228}Rn	^{229}Fr	^{230}Ra	^{231}Ac	^{232}Th	^{233}Pa	^{234}U	^{235}Np	^{236}Pu	^{237}Am	^{238}Cm		^{240}Cf	^{241}Es	^{242}Fm	Md						
																																																																								143	^{227}Po	^{228}At	^{229}Rn	^{230}Fr	^{231}Ra	^{232}Ac	^{233}Th	^{234}Pa	^{235}U	^{236}Np	^{237}Pu	^{238}Am	^{239}Cm	^{240}Bk	^{241}Cf	^{242}Es	^{243}Fm	^{244}Md						
																																																																									144	^{229}At	^{230}Rn	^{231}Fr	^{232}Ra	^{233}Ac	^{234}Th	^{235}Pa	^{236}U	^{237}Np	^{238}Pu	^{239}Am	^{240}Cm	^{241}Bk	^{242}Cf	^{243}Es	^{244}Fm	^{245}Md	102					
																																																																									145	^{230}At	^{231}Rn	^{232}Fr	^{233}Ra	^{234}Ac	^{235}Th	^{236}Pa	^{237}U	^{238}Np	^{239}Pu	^{240}Am	^{241}Cm	^{242}Bk	^{243}Cf	^{244}Es	^{245}Fm	^{246}Md	No					
																																																																										146	^{232}Rn	^{233}Fr	^{234}Ra	^{235}Ac	^{236}Th	^{237}Pa	^{238}U	^{239}Np	^{240}Pu	^{241}Am	^{242}Cm	^{243}Bk	^{244}Cf	^{245}Es	^{246}Fm	^{247}Md		103	104			
																																																																												147		^{236}Ac	^{237}Th	^{238}Pa	^{239}U	^{240}Np	^{241}Pu	^{242}Am	^{243}Cm	^{244}Bk	^{245}Cf	^{246}Es	^{247}Fm	^{248}Md	^{249}No	Lr	Rf			
																																																																													148		^{238}Th	^{239}Pa	^{240}U	^{241}Np	^{242}Pu	^{243}Am	^{244}Cm	^{245}Bk	^{246}Cf	^{247}Es	^{248}Fm	^{249}Md	^{250}No	^{251}Lr	^{252}Rf	105		
																																																																149			^{241}U	^{242}Np	^{243}Pu	^{244}Am	^{245}Cm	^{246}Bk	^{247}Cf	^{248}Es	^{249}Fm	^{250}Md	^{251}No	^{252}Lr	^{253}Rf	Db	106															
																																																																150		^{242}U	^{243}Np	^{244}Pu	^{245}Am	^{246}Cm	^{247}Bk	^{248}Cf	^{249}Es	^{250}Fm	^{251}Md	^{252}No	^{253}Lr	^{254}Rf	^{255}Db	Sg																
																																																																	151		^{244}Np	^{245}Pu	^{246}Am	^{247}Cm	^{248}Bk	^{249}Cf	^{250}Es	^{251}Fm	^{252}Md	^{253}No	^{254}Lr	^{255}Rf	^{256}Db	^{257}Sg	107															
																																																																		152		^{246}Pu	^{247}Am	^{248}Cm	^{249}Bk	^{250}Cf	^{251}Es	^{252}Fm	^{253}Md	^{254}No	^{255}Lr	^{256}Rf	^{257}Db	^{258}Sg	Bh															
																																																																			153	^{247}Pu		^{249}Cm	^{250}Bk	^{251}Cf	^{252}Es	^{253}Fm	^{254}Md	^{255}No	^{256}Lr	^{257}Rf	^{258}Db	^{259}Sg	^{260}Bh	108														
																																																																				154		^{250}Cm	^{251}Bk	^{252}Cf	^{253}Es	^{254}Fm	^{255}Md	^{256}No	^{257}Lr	^{258}Rf	^{259}Db	^{260}Sg	^{261}Bh	Hs	109													
																																																																					155	^{251}Cm	^{252}Bk	^{253}Cf	^{254}Es	^{255}Fm	^{256}Md	^{257}No	^{258}Lr	^{259}Rf	^{260}Db	^{261}Sg	^{262}Bh	^{263}Hs	Mt	110												
																																																																					156		^{253}Bk	^{254}Cf	^{255}Es	^{256}Fm	^{257}Md	^{258}No	^{259}Lr	^{260}Rf	^{261}Db	^{262}Sg		^{264}Hs		Ds												
																																																																						157		^{255}Cf	^{256}Es	^{257}Fm	^{258}Md	^{259}No	^{260}Lr	^{261}Rf	^{262}Db	^{263}Sg	^{264}Bh	^{265}Hs	^{266}Mt	^{267}Ds												
																																																																							158	^{256}Cf	^{257}Es	^{258}Fm	^{259}Md	^{260}No	^{261}Lr	^{262}Rf	^{263}Db	^{264}Sg	^{265}Bh	^{266}Hs														
																																																																								159		^{259}Fm	^{260}Md		^{262}Lr	^{263}Rf		^{265}Sg	^{266}Bh	^{267}Hs	^{268}Mt	^{269}Ds	111											
																																																																									160	^{260}Fm		^{262}No				^{266}Sg	^{267}Bh	^{268}Hs		^{270}Ds	Rg											
																																																																										161			^{264}Lr	^{265}Rf	^{266}Db	^{267}Sg		^{269}Hs	^{270}Mt	^{271}Ds	^{272}Rg											
																																																																											162				^{267}Db	^{268}Sg		^{270}Hs				112										
																																																																												163	^{266}Lr	^{267}Rf	^{268}Db	^{269}Sg	^{270}Bh	^{271}Hs		^{273}Ds	^{274}Rg	Cn	113									
																																																																													164				^{271}Bh	^{272}Hs					Nh									
																																																																														165	^{270}Db	^{271}Sg	^{272}Bh	^{273}Hs	^{274}Mt	^{275}Ds		^{277}Cn	^{278}Nh									
																																																																166				^{275}Mt	^{276}Ds																											
																																																																167		^{274}Bh	^{275}Hs	^{276}Mt	^{277}Ds	^{278}Rg																										
																																																																	168			^{277}Mt		^{279}Rg	^{280}Cn		114																							
																																																																	169		^{277}Hs	^{278}Mt	^{279}Ds	^{280}Rg	^{281}Cn	^{282}Nh	Fl	115																						
																																																																	170				^{280}Ds	^{281}Rg	^{282}Cn	^{283}Nh	^{284}Fl	Mc	116																					
																																																																	171				^{281}Ds	^{282}Rg	^{283}Cn	^{284}Nh	^{285}Fl	^{286}Mc	Lv																					
																																																																		172					^{284}Cn	^{285}Nh	^{286}Fl	^{287}Mc	^{288}Lv	117																				
																																																																			173				^{285}Cn	^{286}Nh	^{287}Fl	^{288}Mc	^{289}Lv	Ts	118																			
																																																																				174					^{288}Fl	^{289}Mc	^{290}Lv		Og																			
																																																																					175				^{289}Fl	^{290}Mc	^{291}Lv																					
																																																																						176					^{292}Lv	^{293}Ts	^{294}Og																			
																																																																							177				^{293}Lv	^{294}Ts																				

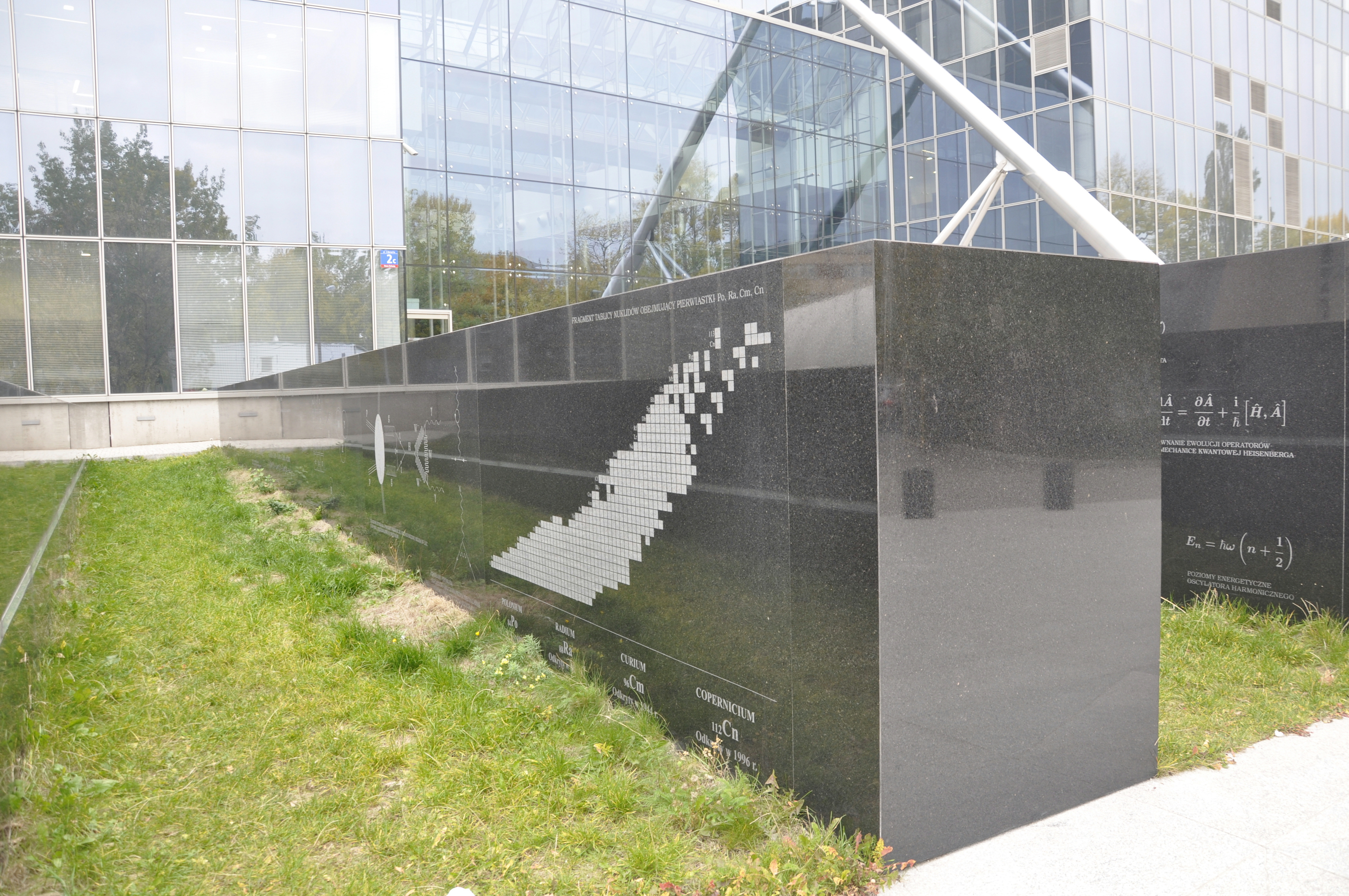
Fragment of table of nuclides as seen on a monument in front of University of Warsaw's Centre of New Technologies, with the four elements named by or for Polish scientists shown in the title ("including Po, Ra, Cm, Cn") and below the table: polonium (_{84}Po) discovered in 1898, radium (_{88}Ra) discovered in 1898, curium (_{96}Cm) discovered in 1944, copernicium (_{112}Cn) discovered in 1996.
