= Blue large-amplitude pulsator =

Class of pulsating variable star

A blue large-amplitude pulsator (BLAP) is a proposed type of pulsating variable star. They are extremely rare, with only 14 being known after examining around a billion stars from the Optical Gravitational Lensing Experiment (OGLE) survey.

== Discovery ==
Blue large-amplitude pulsators were discovered by a team of astronomers from the University of Warsaw and announced in Nature Astronomy journal in June 2017. During a 2013 search for variable stars with periods shorter than one hour, a star with a period of 28.26 minutes was detected and tentatively classified as a δ Scuti variable although it had an unusually large amplitude and short period.

Examination of over one billion Milky Way stars made during the OGLE project revealed another 13 objects with similar properties: periods of 22–39 minutes; near-infrared amplitudes of 0.19–0.36 magnitudes; extremely blue, suggesting temperatures around 30,000 K; and smaller than main sequence stars of that temperature.

== Characteristics ==
Stars of this type are characterized by changes of several dozen percent of the brightness on an average of half an hour (between 20-40 minutes). A detailed analysis of the observation results confirms that BLAP objects have a temperature of about 30,000 °C, and the cause for the changes in brightness is pulsation. The construction model is similar to giant star models — 96% of the mass is concentrated in a core of only 20% of the radius of the entire star. The rest of the mass is a slightly ruffled envelope that pulsates at rapid rhythm - hence the large amplitude of the glare.

Currently, the theory only explains how BLAP stars are built and how their brightness changes, while there are only hypotheses about the formation of such stars. One of the hypotheses is that these stars must have lost a large portion of their mass at some point in their evolution to be as hot as they are now. Scientists assume that such a configuration can not come through the evolution of a lonely star, and one possibility is, for example, the passage of a star in the vicinity of a supermassive black hole to the center of the galaxy. Then the black hole can deprive the star of the outer layer; but as the scientists suggest, such a scenario is very unlikely. Another more likely hypothesis assumes that these objects can be formed after the merger of two small mass stars.
