= Aluminium-26 =

Isotope of aluminium

General
- Symbol: ^{26}Al
- Names: aluminium-26
- Protons (Z): 13
- Neutrons (N): 13

Nuclide data
- Natural abundance: trace (cosmogenic)
- Half-life (t_{1/2}): 7.17×10^{5} years
- Spin: 5+

Decay modes
- Decay mode: Decay energy (MeV)
- β+: 4.004
- ε: 4.004

Aluminium-26 (^{26}Al, Al-26) is a radioactive isotope of the chemical element aluminium, decaying by either positron emission or electron capture to stable magnesium-26. The half-life of ^{26}Al is 717,000 years. This is far too short for the isotope to survive as a primordial nuclide, but a small amount of it is produced by collisions of atoms with cosmic ray protons.

Decay of aluminium-26 also produces gamma rays and X-rays. The x-rays and Auger electrons are emitted by the excited atomic shell of the daughter ^{26}Mg after the electron capture which typically leaves a hole in one of the lower sub-shells.

Because it is radioactive, it is typically stored behind at least 5 centimetres (2 in) of lead. Contact with ^{26}Al may result in radiological contamination. This necessitates special tools for transfer, use, and storage.

== Dating ==
Aluminium-26 can be used to calculate the terrestrial age of meteorites and comets. It is produced in significant quantities in extraterrestrial objects via spallation of silicon alongside beryllium-10, though after falling to Earth, ^{26}Al production ceases and its abundance relative to other cosmogenic nuclides decreases. Absence of aluminium-26 sources on Earth is a consequence of Earth's atmosphere obstructing silicon on the surface and low troposphere from interaction with cosmic rays. Consequently, the amount of ^{26}Al in the sample can be used to calculate the date the meteorite fell to Earth.

== Occurrence in the interstellar medium ==
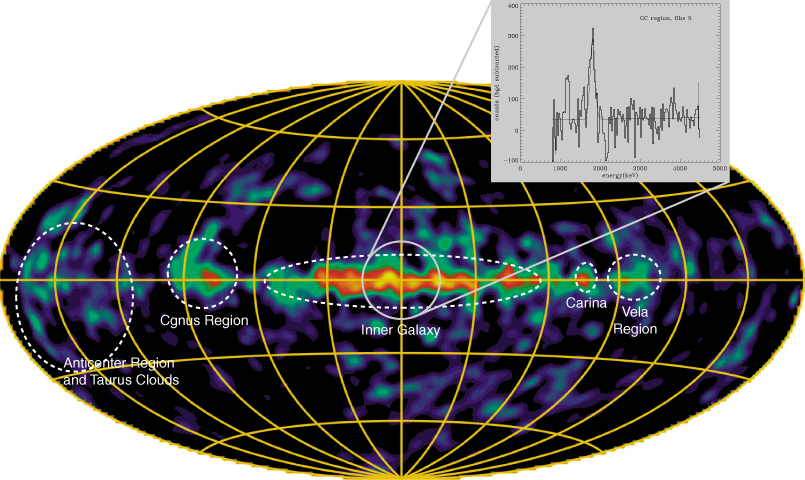
The distribution of ^{26}Al in Milky Way

The gamma ray emission from the decay of aluminium-26 at 1809 keV was the first observed gamma emission from the Galactic Center. The observation was made by the HEAO-3 satellite in 1984.

^{26}Al is mainly produced in supernovae ejecting many radioactive nuclides in the interstellar medium. The isotope is believed to be crucial for the evolution of planetary objects, providing enough heat to melt and differentiate accreting planetesimals. This is known to have happened during the early history of the asteroids 1 Ceres and 4 Vesta. ^{26}Al has been hypothesized to have played a role in the unusual shape of Saturn's moon Iapetus. Iapetus is noticeably flattened and oblate, indicating that it rotated significantly faster early in its history, with a rotation period possibly as short as 17 hours. Heating from ^{26}Al could have provided enough heat in Iapetus to allow it to conform to this rapid rotation period, before the moon cooled and became too rigid to relax back into hydrostatic equilibrium.

The presence of the aluminium monofluoride molecule as the ^{26}Al isotopologue in CK Vulpeculae, which is an unknown type of nova, constitutes the first solid evidence of an extrasolar radioactive molecule.

== Aluminium-26 in the early Solar System ==
In considering the known melting of small bodies in the early Solar System, H. C. Urey noted that the naturally occurring long-lived radioactive nuclei (^{40}K, ^{238}U, ^{235}U and ^{232}Th) were insufficient heat sources. He proposed that the heat sources from short lived nuclei from newly formed stars might be the source and identified ^{26}Al as the most likely choice. This proposal was made well before the general problems of stellar nucleosynthesis of the nuclei were known or understood. This conjecture was based on the discovery of ^{26}Al in a Mg target by Simanton, Rightmire, Long & Kohman.

Their search was undertaken because hitherto there was no known radioactive isotope of Al that might be useful as a tracer. Theoretical considerations suggested that a long-lived ^{26}Al should exist - the life was not then known; it was only estimated to be between 10^{4} and 10^{6} years. The search for ^{26}Al took place over many years, long after the discovery of the extinct radionuclide ^{129}I which showed that nucleosynthesis not more than ~10^{8} years before its formation had contributed to the Solar System. The asteroidal materials that provide meteorite samples were long known to be from the early Solar System.

The Allende meteorite, which fell in 1969, contained abundant calcium–aluminium-rich inclusions (CAIs). These are very refractory materials and were interpreted as being condensates from a hot solar nebula. then discovered that the oxygen in these objects was enhanced in ^{16}O by ~5% while the ^{17}O/^{18}O was the same as terrestrial. This clearly showed a large effect in an abundant element that might be nuclear, possibly from a stellar source. These objects were then found to contain strontium with very low ^{87}Sr/^{86}Sr indicating that they were a few million years older than previously analyzed meteoritic material and that this type of material would merit a search for ^{26}Al.

To establish the presence of ^{26}Al in very ancient materials requires demonstrating that samples must contain clear excesses of ^{26}Mg/^{24}Mg which correlates with the ratio of ^{27}Al/^{24}Mg. The stable ^{27}Al is then a surrogate for extinct ^{26}Al. The different ^{27}Al/^{24}Mg ratios are coupled to different chemical phases in a sample and are the result of normal chemical separation processes associated with the growth of the crystals in the CAIs. Clear evidence of the presence of ^{26}Al at an abundance ratio of 5×10^{−5} (relative to ^{27}Al, the standard way of quantifying this isotope) was shown by Lee et al. The value (^{26}Al/^{27}Al ~ 5×10^{−5}) has now been generally established as the high value in early Solar System samples and has been generally used as a refined time scale chronometer for the early Solar System. Lower values imply a more recent time of formation. If this ^{26}Al is the result of pre-solar stellar sources, then this implies a close connection in time between the formation of the Solar System and the production in some exploding star. Many materials which had been presumed to be very early (e.g. chondrules) appear to have formed a few million years later. Other extinct radioactive nuclei, which clearly had a stellar origin, were then being discovered.

That ^{26}Al is present in the interstellar medium as a major gamma ray source was not explored until the development of the high-energy astronomical observatory program. The HEAO-3 spacecraft with cooled Ge detectors allowed the clear detection of 1.808 MeV gamma lines from the central part of the galaxy from a distributed ^{26}Al source. This represents about two solar masses of ^{26}Al. This discovery was greatly expanded on by observations from the Compton Gamma Ray Observatory using the COMPTEL telescope in the galaxy. Subsequently, the ^{60}Fe lines (1.173 MeV and 1.333 Mev) were also detected showing the relative rates of decays from ^{60}Fe to ^{26}Al to be ^{60}Fe/^{26}Al ~ 0.11.

In pursuit of the carriers of ^{22}Ne in the sludge produced by chemical destruction of some meteorites, carrier grains in micron size, acid-resistant ultra-refractory materials (e.g. C, SiC) were found by E. Anders & the Chicago group. The carrier grains were clearly shown to be circumstellar condensates from earlier stars and often contained very large enhancements in ^{26}Mg/^{24}Mg from the decay of ^{26}Al with ^{26}Al/^{27}Al sometimes approaching 0.2.

The production of ^{26}Al by cosmic ray interactions in unshielded materials (meteorites) is used as a monitor of the last time of exposure to cosmic rays. The maximum amount detected are far below the initial inventory that was found in the very early solar system.

== Metastable state ==
Before 1954, the half-life of aluminium-26m was measured to be 6.3 seconds. After it was theorized that this could be the half-life of a metastable state (isomer) of aluminium-26, the ground state was produced by bombardment of magnesium-26 and magnesium-25 with deuterons in the cyclotron of the University of Pittsburgh. The first half-life was determined to be in the range of 10^{6} years. The Fermi beta decay half-life of the aluminium-26 metastable state is of interest in the experimental testing of two components of the Standard Model, namely, the conserved-vector-current hypothesis and the required unitarity of the Cabibbo–Kobayashi–Maskawa matrix. The decay is superallowed. The 2011 measurement of the half-life of ^{26m}Al is 6346.54 ± 0.46(statistical) ± 0.60(system) milliseconds.

== See also ==
- Isotopes of aluminium
- Radiometric dating § The 26Al – 26Mg chronometer
- Surface exposure dating
