= Proton capture =

Atomic nuclear process

Proton capture is a nuclear reaction in which an atomic nucleus and one or more protons collide and merge to form a heavier nucleus.

Since protons have positive electric charge, they are repelled electrostatically by the positively charged nucleus. Therefore, it is more difficult for protons to enter the nucleus compared to neutrally charged neutrons.

Proton capture plays an important role in the cosmic nucleosynthesis of proton-rich isotopes. In stars it can proceed in two ways: as a rapid (rp-process) or a slow process (p-process). It is also key to CNO fusion reactions in stars.

== See also ==
- p-nuclei
- Proton emission
- List of particles
- Neutron capture
- Radioactive decay
- Rays: α — β — γ — δ
