= Extinct radionuclide =

Radionuclide formed by nucleosynthesis before formation of the Solar System

An extinct radionuclide is a radionuclide that was formed by nucleosynthesis before the formation of the Solar System, about 4.6 billion years ago, but has since decayed to undetectability. Extinct radionuclides were present in the early Solar System either from stellar or from cosmogenic nucleosynthesis, and became part of the composition of meteorites and protoplanets. All extinct radionuclides have half-lives shorter than 100 million years; not all possible radionuclides have been identified.

Some extinct radionuclides may also be still found in nature because they are continuously generated or replenished by natural processes, such as cosmic rays (cosmogenic nuclides), background radiation, or the decay chain or spontaneous fission of other radionuclides, but their primordial fraction is still extinct.

Examples of extinct radionuclides include iodine-129 (the first to be noted in 1960, inferred from excess xenon-129 concentrations in meteorites, in the xenon-iodine dating system), aluminium-26 (inferred from extra magnesium-26 found in meteorites), and iron-60. The method of detecting the former existence of such isotopes is in general from detection of anomalous concentrations of their decay products.

The Solar System and Earth are formed from primordial nuclides and extinct nuclides. Extinct nuclides have decayed away, but primordial nuclides still exist in their original state (undecayed). There are 251 stable primordial nuclides, and 35 unstable primordial radionuclides that have not yet gone extinct.

== List of extinct radionuclides ==
A partial list of radionuclides not found on Earth, but for which decay products are, or should be, present:

Isotope	Halflife (Myr)	Daughter
Samarium-146	92.0	Neodymium-142 (stable)
Plutonium-244	81.3	Thorium-232, fission products (especially xenon)
Niobium-92	34.7	Zirconium-92 (stable)
Uranium-236	23.42	Thorium-232
Lead-205	17.0	Thallium-205 (stable)
Iodine-129	16.1	Xenon-129 (stable)
Curium-247	15.6	Uranium-235
Hafnium-182	8.90	Tungsten-182 (stable)
Palladium-107	6.5	Silver-107 (stable)
Technetium-97	4.21	Molybdenum-97 (stable)
Technetium-98	4.2	Ruthenium-98 (stable)
Manganese-53	3.7	Chromium-53 (stable)
Iron-60	2.62	Nickel-60 (stable)
Neptunium-237	2.144	Bismuth-209
Gadolinium-150	1.79	Neodymium-142 (stable)
Zirconium-93	1.61	Niobium-93 (stable)
Dysprosium-154	1.40	Neodymium-142 (stable)
Beryllium-10	1.387	Boron-10 (stable)
Aluminium-26	0.717	Magnesium-26 (stable)
Calcium-41	0.099	Potassium-41 (stable)

Plutonium-244 and samarium-146 have half-lives long enough for traces of their primordial abundance to remain and be detected, but so far they have not been confirmed (plutonium-244 has been detected from interstellar particles).

Notable otherwise-extinct isotopes still being produced on Earth include:

- Manganese-53 and beryllium-10 are produced by cosmic ray spallation on dust in the upper atmosphere.
- Uranium-236 is produced in uranium ores by neutrons from other radioisotopes.
- Iodine-129 is produced from tellurium-130 by cosmic-ray muons, from cosmic ray spallation of stable xenon isotopes in the atmosphere, and from natural fission.

Radioisotopes with half-lives shorter than one million years are also produced: for example, carbon-14 (half-life 5700 years) by cosmic rays in the atmosphere.

== Use in geochronology ==
Despite the fact that the radioactive isotopes mentioned above are now effectively extinct, the record of their existence is found in their decay products, and geologists may use them as geochronometers. Their usefulness derives from a few factors such as the fact that their short half-lives can provide high chronological resolution and the chemical mobility of various elements can date unique geological processes such as igneous fractionation and surface weathering. There are, however, hurdles to overcome when using extinct nuclides. The need for high-precision isotope ratio measurements is paramount as the extinct radionuclides contribute only a small fraction of the daughter isotopes. Compounding this problem is the increasing contribution that high-energy cosmic rays have on already minute amounts of daughter isotopes formed from the extinct nuclides. Distinguishing the source and abundance of these effects is critical to obtaining accurate ages from extinct nuclides. Additionally, more work needs to be done in determining a more precise half-life for some of these isotopes where the uncertainty remains large.

== See also ==
- Presolar grains
- Radiogenic nuclide
- Radiometric dating
- List of nuclides which includes a list of radionuclides in order by half-life
