= Isotopes of aluminium =

Isotopes of aluminium (_{13}Al)
Main isotopes			Decay	
Isotope	abundance	half-life (t_{1/2})	mode	product
^{26}Al	trace	7.17×10^{5} y	β^{+}	^{26}Mg
^{27}Al	100%	stable		

Standard atomic weight A_{r}°(Al)
- 26.9815384±0.0000003; 26.982±0.001 (abridged)

Aluminium or aluminum (_{13}Al) has one stable isotope, ^{27}Al, comprising all natural aluminium. The radioactive ^{26}Al, with half-life 717,000 years, occurs in traces from cosmic-ray spallation of argon in the atmosphere.

Other than ^{26}Al, there are 22 known synthetic radioisotopes from ^{20}Al to ^{43}Al, and 4 known metastable states; all have half-lives under 7 minutes, most under a second.

^{26}Al is an extinct radionuclide and has received attention as such, being used in the study of meteorites. Its terrestrial occurrence has also found practical application in dating marine sediments, manganese nodules, glacial ice, quartz in rock exposures, and meteorites. The ratio of ^{26}Al to ^{10}Be has been used to study the role of sediment transport, deposition, and storage, as well as burial times, and erosion, on 10^{5} to 10^{6} year time scales.

== List of isotopes ==
Nuclide (Note: ^{m}Al – Excited nuclear isomer.)	Z	N	Isotopic mass (Da) (Note: ( ) – Uncertainty (1σ) is given in concise form in parentheses after the corresponding last digits.) (Note: # – Atomic mass marked #: value and uncertainty derived not from purely experimental data, but at least partly from trends from the Mass Surface (TMS).)	Discovery year	Half-life	Decay mode (Note: Modes of decay: IT: / Isomeric transition)	Daughter isotope (Note: Bold symbol as daughter – Daughter product is stable.)	Spin and parity (Note: ( ) spin value – Indicates spin with weak assignment arguments.) (Note: # – Values marked # are not purely derived from experimental data, but at least partly from trends of neighboring nuclides (TNN).)	Isotopic abundance
Nuclide	Excitation energy			Discovery year	Half-life	Decay mode	Daughter isotope	Spin and parity	Isotopic abundance
^{20}Al	13	7	20.04326(13)	2025	>1.1 zs	p	^{19}Mg	(1−)	
^{21}Al	13	8	21.0278(13)	2024	>1.1 zs	p	^{20}Mg	(5/2+)	
^{22}Al	13	9	22.01942310(32)	1982	91.1(5) ms	β^{+}, p (55%)	^{21}Na	(4)+	
^{22}Al	13	9	22.01942310(32)	1982	91.1(5) ms	β^{+} (44%)	^{22}Mg	(4)+	
^{22}Al	13	9	22.01942310(32)	1982	91.1(5) ms	β^{+}, 2p (1.10%)	^{20}Ne	(4)+	
^{22}Al	13	9	22.01942310(32)	1982	91.1(5) ms	β^{+}, α (0.038%)	^{18}Ne	(4)+	
^{23}Al	13	10	23.00724435(37)	1969	446(6) ms	β^{+} (98.78%)	^{23}Mg	5/2+	
^{23}Al	13	10	23.00724435(37)	1969	446(6) ms	β^{+}, p (1.22%)	^{22}Na	5/2+	
^{24}Al	13	11	23.99994760(24)	1953	2.053(4) s	β^{+} (99.96%)	^{24}Mg	4+	
^{24}Al	13	11	23.99994760(24)	1953	2.053(4) s	β^{+}, α (0.035%)	^{20}Ne	4+	
^{24}Al	13	11	23.99994760(24)	1953	2.053(4) s	β^{+}, p (0.0016%)	^{23}Na	4+	
^{24m}Al	425.8(1) keV			1966	130(3) ms	IT (82.5%)	^{24}Al	1+	
^{24m}Al	425.8(1) keV			1966	130(3) ms	β^{+} (17.5%)	^{24}Mg	1+	
^{24m}Al	425.8(1) keV			1966	130(3) ms	β^{+}, α (0.028%)	^{20}Ne	1+	
^{25}Al	13	12	24.990428308(69)	1953	7.1666(23) s	β^{+}	^{25}Mg	5/2+	
^{26}Al (Note: Used in radiodating events early in the Solar System's history and meteorites)	13	13	25.986891876(71)	1934	7.17(24)×10^{5} y	β^{+} (85%)	^{26}Mg	5+	Trace (Note: cosmogenic)
^{26}Al	13	13	25.986891876(71)	1934	7.17(24)×10^{5} y	EC (15%)	^{26}Mg	5+	Trace
^{26m}Al	228.306(13) keV			1954	6.3460(5) s	β^{+}	^{26}Mg	0+	
^{27}Al	13	14	26.981538408(50)	1922	Stable			5/2+	1.0000
^{28}Al	13	15	27.981910009(52)	1934	2.245(5) min	β^{−}	^{28}Si	3+	
^{29}Al	13	16	28.98045316(37)	1939	6.56(6) min	β^{−}	^{29}Si	5/2+	
^{30}Al	13	17	29.9829692(21)	1961	3.62(6) s	β^{−}	^{30}Si	3+	
^{31}Al	13	18	30.9839498(24)	1971	644(25) ms	β^{−} (>98.4%)	^{31}Si	5/2+	
^{31}Al	13	18	30.9839498(24)	1971	644(25) ms	β^{−}, n (<1.6%)	^{30}Si	5/2+	
^{32}Al	13	19	31.9880843(77)	1971	32.6(5) ms	β^{−} (99.3%)	^{32}Si	1+	
^{32}Al	13	19	31.9880843(77)	1971	32.6(5) ms	β^{−}, n (0.7%)	^{31}Si	1+	
^{32m}Al	956.6(5) keV			1996	200(20) ns	IT	^{32}Al	(4+)	
^{33}Al	13	20	32.9908777(75)	1971	41.46(9) ms	β^{−} (91.5%)	^{33}Si	5/2+	
^{33}Al	13	20	32.9908777(75)	1971	41.46(9) ms	β^{−}, n (8.5%)	^{32}Si	5/2+	
^{34}Al	13	21	33.9967819(23)	1977	53.73(13) ms	β^{−} (74%)	^{34}Si	4−	
^{34}Al	13	21	33.9967819(23)	1977	53.73(13) ms	β^{−}, n (26%)	^{33}Si	4−	
^{34m}Al	46.4(17) keV			2012	22.1(2) ms	β^{−} (89%)	^{34}Si	1+	
^{34m}Al	46.4(17) keV			2012	22.1(2) ms	β^{−}, n (11%)	^{33}Si	1+	
^{35}Al	13	22	34.9997598(79)	1979	38.16(21) ms	β^{−} (64.2%)	^{35}Si	(5/2+,3/2+)	
^{35}Al	13	22	34.9997598(79)	1979	38.16(21) ms	β^{−}, n (35.8%)	^{34}Si	(5/2+,3/2+)	
^{36}Al	13	23	36.00639(16)	1979	90(40) ms	β^{−} (>69%)	^{36}Si		
^{36}Al	13	23	36.00639(16)	1979	90(40) ms	β^{−}, n (<31%)	^{35}Si		
^{37}Al	13	24	37.01053(19)	1979	11.4(3) ms	β^{−}, n (52%)	^{36}Si	5/2+#	
^{37}Al	13	24	37.01053(19)	1979	11.4(3) ms	β^{−} (<47%)	^{37}Si	5/2+#	
^{37}Al	13	24	37.01053(19)	1979	11.4(3) ms	β^{−}, 2n (>1%)	^{35}Si	5/2+#	
^{38}Al	13	25	38.01768(16)#	1989	9.0(7) ms	β^{−}, n (84%)	^{37}Si	0−#	
^{38}Al	13	25	38.01768(16)#	1989	9.0(7) ms	β^{−} (16%)	^{38}Si	0−#	
^{39}Al	13	26	39.02307(32)#	1989	7.6(16) ms	β^{−}, n (97%)	^{38}Si	5/2+#	
^{39}Al	13	26	39.02307(32)#	1989	7.6(16) ms	β^{−} (3%)	^{39}Si	5/2+#	
^{40}Al	13	27	40.03094(32)#	2002	5.7(3 (stat), 2 (sys)) ms	β^{−}, n (64%)	^{39}Si		
^{40}Al	13	27	40.03094(32)#	2002	5.7(3 (stat), 2 (sys)) ms	β^{−}, 2n (20%)	^{38}Si		
^{40}Al	13	27	40.03094(32)#	2002	5.7(3 (stat), 2 (sys)) ms	β^{−} (16%)	^{40}Si		
^{41}Al	13	28	41.03713(43)#	2002	3.5(8 (stat), 4 (sys)) ms	β^{−}, n (86%)	^{40}Si	5/2+#	
^{41}Al	13	28	41.03713(43)#	2002	3.5(8 (stat), 4 (sys)) ms	β^{−}, 2n (11%)	^{39}Si	5/2+#	
^{41}Al	13	28	41.03713(43)#	2002	3.5(8 (stat), 4 (sys)) ms	β^{−} (3%)	^{41}Si	5/2+#	
^{42}Al	13	29	42.04508(54)#	2007	3# ms [>170 ns]				
^{43}Al	13	30	43.05182(64)#	2007	4# ms [>170 ns]	β^{−}?	^{43}Si	5/2+#	
This table header & footer:

== Aluminium-26 ==
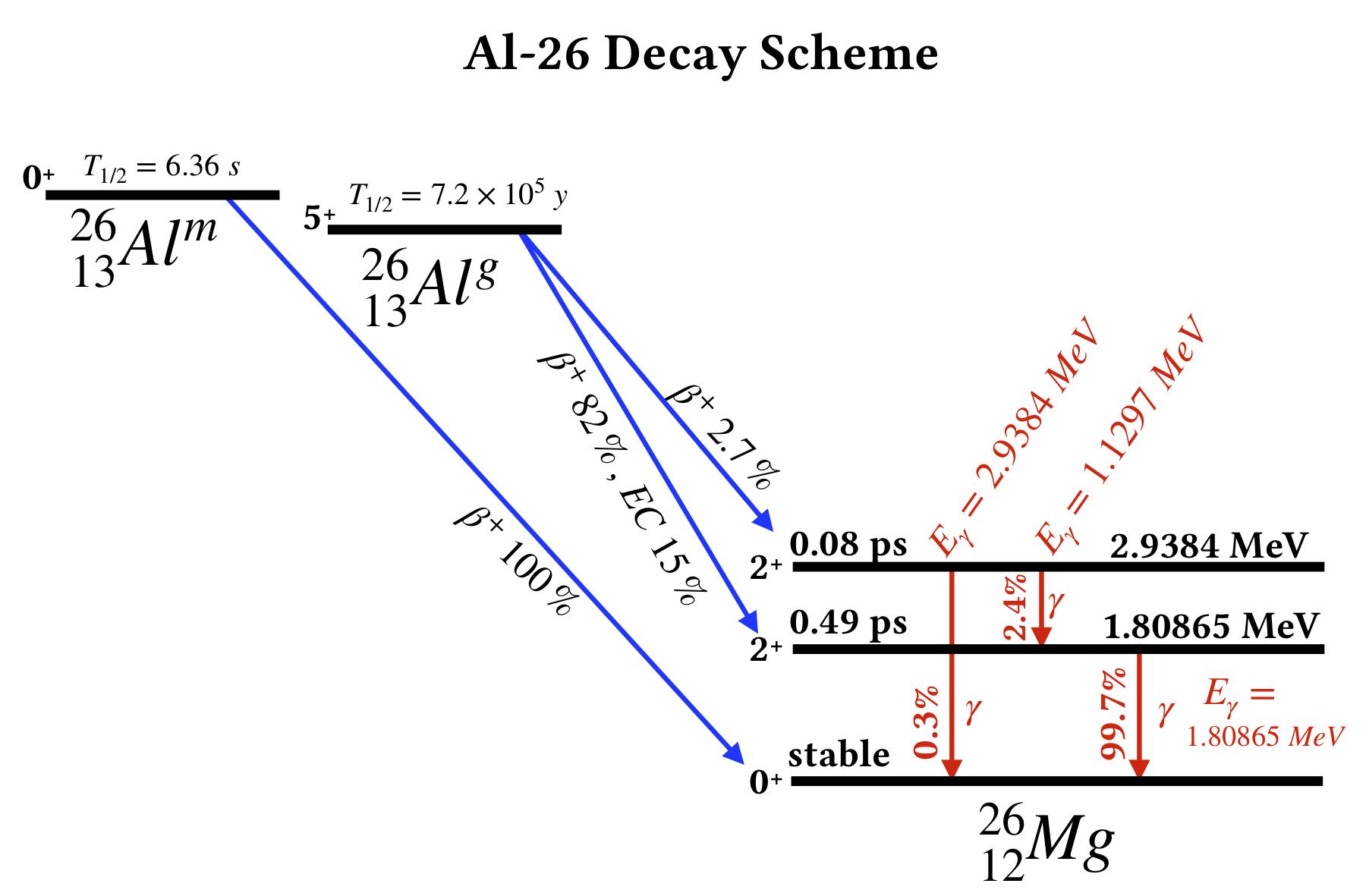
The decay level scheme for ^{26}Al and ^{26m}Al to ^{26}Mg.

Cosmogenic aluminium-26 was first described in studies of the Moon and meteorites. Meteorite fragments, after departure from their parent bodies, are exposed to intense cosmic-ray bombardment during their travel through space, causing substantial ^{26}Al production. After falling to Earth, atmospheric shielding protects the meteorite fragments from further ^{26}Al production, and its decay can then be used to determine the meteorite's terrestrial age. Meteorite research has also shown that ^{26}Al was relatively abundant at the time of formation of our planetary system. Most meteoriticists believe that the energy released by the decay of ^{26}Al was responsible for the melting and differentiation of some asteroids after their formation 4.55 billion years ago.

== See also ==
Daughter products other than aluminum

- Isotopes of silicon
- Isotopes of magnesium
- Isotopes of sodium
- Isotopes of neon
