= Isotopes of magnesium =

Isotopes of magnesium (_{12}Mg)
Main isotopes			Decay	
Isotope	abundance	half-life (t_{1/2})	mode	product
^{24}Mg	79.0%	stable		
^{25}Mg	10.0%	stable		
^{26}Mg	11.0%	stable		

Standard atomic weight A_{r}°(Mg)
- [24.304, 24.307]; 24.305±0.002 (abridged)

Magnesium (_{12}Mg) naturally occurs as three stable isotopes: ^{24}Mg, ^{25}Mg, and ^{26}Mg. There are also 19 artificial radioisotopes that have been discovered, ranging from ^{18}Mg to ^{40}Mg (with the exception of ^{39}Mg). The longest-lived of them is ^{28}Mg with a half-life of 20.915 hours. The isotopes lighter than the stable ones mostly decay to isotopes of sodium, while those heavier decay to isotopes of aluminium.

A precise measurement of the neutron-rich ^{40}Mg in 2019 showed an unexpected difference in its nuclear structure, compared to the lighter neighboring isotopes.

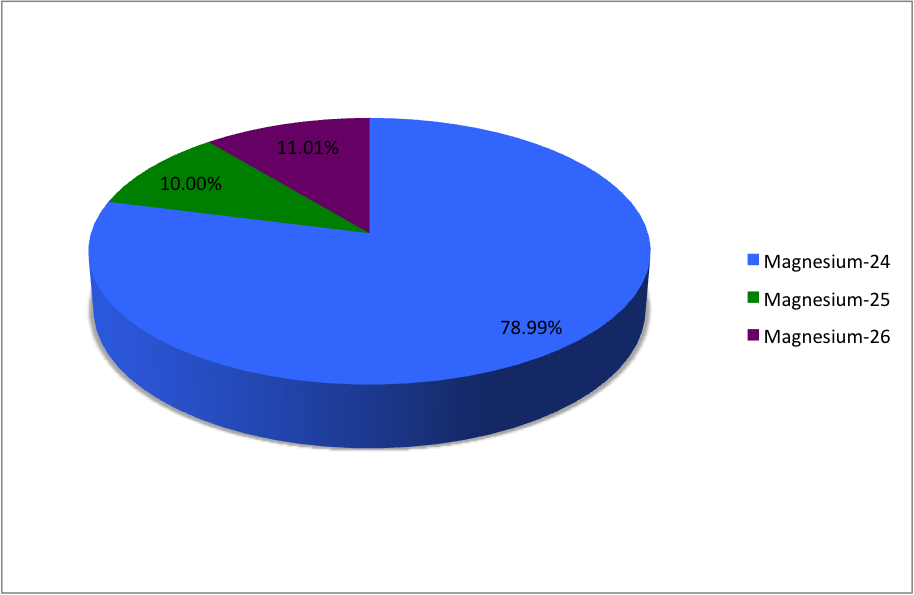
The abundances of the naturally occurring isotopes of magnesium.

== List of isotopes ==
Nuclide	Z	N	Isotopic mass (Da) (Note: ( ) – Uncertainty (1σ) is given in concise form in parentheses after the corresponding last digits.)	Discovery year	Half-life (Note: # – Values marked # are not purely derived from experimental data, but at least partly from trends of neighboring nuclides (TNN).)	Decay mode (Note: Modes of decay: n: / Neutron emission; p: / Proton emission)	Daughter isotope (Note: Bold symbol as daughter – Daughter product is stable.)	Spin and parity (Note: ( ) spin value – Indicates spin with weak assignment arguments.)	Natural abundance (mole fraction)	
Nuclide	Z	N	Isotopic mass (Da)	Discovery year	Half-life	Decay mode	Daughter isotope	Spin and parity	Normal proportion	Range of variation
^{18}Mg	12	6		2021	4.0(3.4) zs	2p	^{16}Ne (Note: Also immediately emits two protons for the net reaction of ^{18}Mg -> ^{14}O + 4 ^{1}H)	0+		
^{19}Mg	12	7	19.034180(60)	2007	5(3) ps	2p	^{17}Ne	1/2−#		
^{20}Mg	12	8	20.0187631(20)	1974	90.4(5) ms	β^{+} (69.7(1.2)%)	^{20}Na	0+		
^{20}Mg	12	8	20.0187631(20)	1974	90.4(5) ms	β^{+}p (30.3(1.2)%)	^{19}Ne	0+		
^{21}Mg	12	9	21.0117058(8)	1965	120.0(4) ms	β^{+} (79.8(2.1)%)	^{21}Na	5/2+		
^{21}Mg	12	9	21.0117058(8)	1965	120.0(4) ms	β^{+}p (20.1(2.1)%)	^{20}Ne	5/2+		
^{21}Mg	12	9	21.0117058(8)	1965	120.0(4) ms	β^{+}α (0.116(18)%)	^{17}F	5/2+		
^{21}Mg	12	9	21.0117058(8)	1965	120.0(4) ms	β^{+}pα (0.016(3)%)	^{16}O	5/2+		
^{22}Mg	12	10	21.99957060(17)	1961	3.8745(7) s	β^{+}	^{22}Na	0+		
^{23}Mg	12	11	22.99412377(3)	1939	11.3039(32) s	β^{+}	^{23}Na	3/2+		
^{24}Mg	12	12	23.985041689(14)	1920	Stable			0+	[0.7888, 0.7905]	
^{25}Mg	12	13	24.98583697(5)	1920	Stable			5/2+	[0.09988, 0.10034]	
^{26}Mg (Note: Used in radiodating events early in the Solar System's history, as product of the extinct ^{26}Al)	12	14	25.98259297(3)	1920	Stable			0+	[0.1096, 0.1109]	
^{27}Mg	12	15	26.98434065(5)	1934	9.435(27) min	β^{−}	^{27}Al	1/2+		
^{28}Mg	12	16	27.98387543(28)	1953	20.915(9) h	β^{−}	^{28}Al	0+		
^{29}Mg	12	17	28.9886072(4)	1971	1.30(12) s	β^{−}	^{29}Al	3/2+		
^{30}Mg	12	18	29.9904655(14)	1971	317(4) ms	β^{−} (> 99.94%)	^{30}Al	0+		
^{30}Mg	12	18	29.9904655(14)	1971	317(4) ms	β^{−}n (< 0.06%)	^{29}Al	0+		
^{31}Mg	12	19	30.996648(3)	1977	270(2) ms	β^{−} (93.8(1.9)%)	^{31}Al	1/2+		
^{31}Mg	12	19	30.996648(3)	1977	270(2) ms	β^{−}n (6.2(1.9)%)	^{30}Al	1/2+		
^{32}Mg	12	20	31.999110(4)	1977	80.4(4) ms	β^{−} (94.5(5)%)	^{32}Al	0+		
^{32}Mg	12	20	31.999110(4)	1977	80.4(4) ms	β^{−}n (5.5(5)%)	^{31}Al	0+		
^{33}Mg	12	21	33.0053279(29)	1979	92.0(1.2) ms	β^{−} (86(2)%)	^{33}Al	3/2−		
^{33}Mg	12	21	33.0053279(29)	1979	92.0(1.2) ms	β^{−}n (14(2)%)	^{32}Al	3/2−		
^{33}Mg	12	21	33.0053279(29)	1979	92.0(1.2) ms	β^{−}2n ?	^{31}Al	3/2−		
^{34}Mg	12	22	34.008935(7)	1979	44.9(4) ms	β^{−} (> 78.9(7.0)%)	^{34}Al	0+		
^{34}Mg	12	22	34.008935(7)	1979	44.9(4) ms	β^{−}n (21(7)%)	^{33}Al	0+		
^{34}Mg	12	22	34.008935(7)	1979	44.9(4) ms	β^{−}2n (< 0.1%)	^{32}Al	0+		
^{35}Mg	12	23	35.01679(29)	1989	11.3(6) ms	β^{−}n (52(46)%)	^{34}Al	(3/2−, 5/2−)		
^{35}Mg	12	23	35.01679(29)	1989	11.3(6) ms	β^{−} (48(46)%)	^{35}Al	(3/2−, 5/2−)		
^{35}Mg	12	23	35.01679(29)	1989	11.3(6) ms	β^{−}2n ?	^{33}Al	(3/2−, 5/2−)		
^{36}Mg	12	24	36.02188(74)	1989	3.9(1.3) ms	β^{−} (52(12)%)	^{36}Al	0+		
^{36}Mg	12	24	36.02188(74)	1989	3.9(1.3) ms	β^{−}n (48(12)%)	^{35}Al	0+		
^{36}Mg	12	24	36.02188(74)	1989	3.9(1.3) ms	β^{−}2n ?	^{34}Al	0+		
^{36m}Mg	833 keV			2024	90+80 −7 ms	IT	^{36}Mg	(0^{+})		
^{37}Mg	12	25	37.03029(75)	1996	8(4) ms	β^{−} ?	^{37}Al	(3/2−)		
^{37}Mg	12	25	37.03029(75)	1996	8(4) ms	β^{−}n ?	^{36}Al	(3/2−)		
^{37}Mg	12	25	37.03029(75)	1996	8(4) ms	β^{−}2n ?	^{35}Al	(3/2−)		
^{38}Mg	12	26	38.03658(54)#	2002	3.1(4 (stat), 2 (sys)) ms	β^{−}n (81%)	^{37}Al	0+		
^{38}Mg	12	26	38.03658(54)#	2002	3.1(4 (stat), 2 (sys)) ms	β^{−} (9%)	^{38}Al	0+		
^{38}Mg	12	26	38.03658(54)#	2002	3.1(4 (stat), 2 (sys)) ms	β^{−}2n (9%)	^{36}Al	0+		
^{40}Mg	12	28	40.05319(54)#	2007	1# ms [> 170 ns]	β^{−} ?	^{40}Al	0+		
^{40}Mg	12	28	40.05319(54)#	2007	1# ms [> 170 ns]	β^{−}n ?	^{39}Al	0+		
^{40}Mg	12	28	40.05319(54)#	2007	1# ms [> 170 ns]	β^{−}2n ?	^{38}Al	0+		
This table header & footer:

== See also ==
Daughter products other than magnesium

- Isotopes of aluminum
- Isotopes of sodium
- Isotopes of neon
- Isotopes of fluorine
- Isotopes of oxygen
