= Isotopes of silicon =

Isotopes of silicon (_{14}Si)
Main isotopes			Decay	
Isotope	abundance	half-life (t_{1/2})	mode	product
^{28}Si	92.24%	stable		
^{29}Si	4.67%	stable		
^{30}Si	3.07%	stable		
^{31}Si	trace	2.62 h	β^{−}	^{31}P
^{32}Si	trace	157 y	β^{−}	^{32}P

Standard atomic weight A_{r}°(Si)
- [28.084, 28.086]; 28.085±0.001 (abridged)

Silicon (_{14}Si) has 25 known isotopes, with mass number ranging from 22 to 46. ^{28}Si (the most abundant isotope, at 92.24%), ^{29}Si (4.67%), and ^{30}Si (3.07%) are stable. The longest-lived radioisotope is ^{32}Si, which occurs naturally in tiny quantities from cosmic ray spallation of argon. Its half-life has been determined to be approximately 157 years; it beta decays with energy 0.21 MeV to ^{32}P, which in turn beta-decays, with half-life 14.269 days to ^{32}S; neither step has gamma emission. After ^{32}Si, ^{31}Si has the second longest half-life at 157.2 minutes. All others have half-lives under 7 seconds.

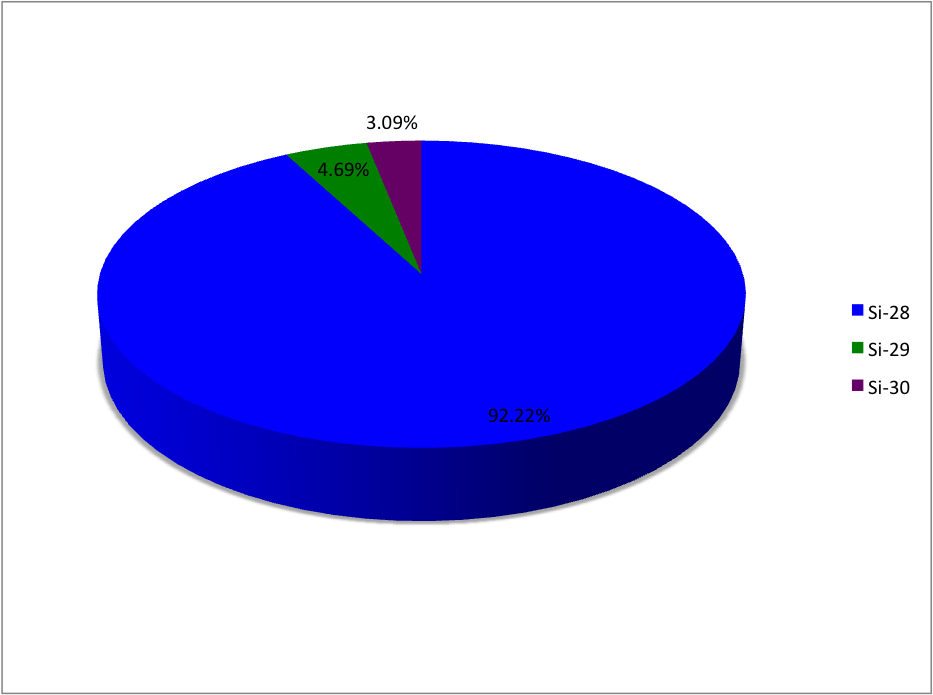
A chart showing the relative abundances of the naturally occurring isotopes of silicon.

== List of isotopes ==
Nuclide (Note: ^{m}Si – Excited nuclear isomer.)	Z	N	Isotopic mass (Da) (Note: ( ) – Uncertainty (1σ) is given in concise form in parentheses after the corresponding last digits.) (Note: # – Atomic mass marked #: value and uncertainty derived not from purely experimental data, but at least partly from trends from the Mass Surface (TMS).)	Discovery year	Half-life (Note: # – Values marked # are not purely derived from experimental data, but at least partly from trends of neighboring nuclides (TNN).)	Decay mode (Note: Modes of decay: IT: / Isomeric transition; n: / Neutron emission; p: / Proton emission)	Daughter isotope (Note: Bold symbol as daughter – Daughter product is stable.)	Spin and parity (Note: ( ) spin value – Indicates spin with weak assignment arguments.)	Natural abundance (mole fraction)	
Nuclide	Excitation energy			Discovery year	Half-life	Decay mode	Daughter isotope	Spin and parity	Normal proportion	Range of variation
^{22}Si	14	8	22.034168(58)	1987	28.7(11) ms	β^{+}, p (62%)	^{21}Mg	0+		
^{22}Si	14	8	22.034168(58)	1987	28.7(11) ms	β^{+} (37%)	^{22}Al	0+		
^{22}Si	14	8	22.034168(58)	1987	28.7(11) ms	β^{+}, 2p (0.7%)	^{20}Na	0+		
^{23}Si	14	9	23.025083(17)	1986	42.3(4) ms	β^{+}, p (88%)	^{22}Mg	3/2+#		
^{23}Si	14	9	23.025083(17)	1986	42.3(4) ms	β^{+} (8%)	^{23}Al	3/2+#		
^{23}Si	14	9	23.025083(17)	1986	42.3(4) ms	β^{+}, 2p (3.6%)	^{21}Na	3/2+#		
^{24}Si	14	10	24.011535(21)	1979	143.2 (21) ms	β^{+} (65.5%)	^{24}Al	0+		
^{24}Si	14	10	24.011535(21)	1979	143.2 (21) ms	β^{+}, p (34.5%)	^{23}Mg	0+		
^{25}Si	14	11	25.004109(11)	1963	220.6(10) ms	β^{+} (65%)	^{25}Al	5/2+		
^{25}Si	14	11	25.004109(11)	1963	220.6(10) ms	β^{+}, p (35%)	^{24}Mg	5/2+		
^{26}Si	14	12	25.99233382(12)	1960	2.2453(7) s	β^{+}	^{26}Al	0+		
^{27}Si	14	13	26.98670469(12)	1939	4.117(14) s	β^{+}	^{27}Al	5/2+		
^{28}Si	14	14	27.97692653442(55)	1920	Stable			0+	0.92223(19)	0.92205–0.92241
^{29}Si	14	15	28.97649466434(60)	1920	Stable			1/2+	0.04685(8)	0.04678–0.04692
^{30}Si	14	16	29.973770137(23)	1924	Stable			0+	0.03092(11)	0.03082–0.03102
^{31}Si	14	17	30.975363196(46)	1934	157.16(20) min	β^{−}	^{31}P	3/2+	trace (Note: cosmogenic nuclide)	
^{32}Si	14	18	31.97415154(32)	1953	157(7) y	β^{−}	^{32}P	0+	trace	
^{33}Si	14	19	32.97797696(75)	1971	6.18(18) s	β^{−}	^{33}P	3/2+		
^{34}Si	14	20	33.97853805(86)	1971	2.77(20) s	β^{−}	^{34}P	0+		
^{34m}Si	4256.1(4) keV			(1989) (Note: Half-life only inferred and not measured.)	<210 ns	IT	^{34}Si	(3−)		
^{35}Si	14	21	34.984550(38)	1971	780(120) ms	β^{−}	^{35}P	7/2−#		
^{35}Si	14	21	34.984550(38)	1971	780(120) ms	β^{−}, n?	^{34}P	7/2−#		
^{36}Si	14	22	35.986649(77)	1971	503(2) ms	β^{−} (88%)	^{36}P	0+		
^{36}Si	14	22	35.986649(77)	1971	503(2) ms	β^{−}, n (12%)	^{35}P	0+		
^{37}Si	14	23	36.99295(12)	1979	141.0(35) ms	β^{−} (83%)	^{37}P	(5/2−)		
^{37}Si	14	23	36.99295(12)	1979	141.0(35) ms	β^{−}, n (17%)	^{36}P	(5/2−)		
^{37}Si	14	23	36.99295(12)	1979	141.0(35) ms	β^{−}, 2n?	^{35}P	(5/2−)		
^{38}Si	14	24	37.99552(11)	1979	63(8) ms	β^{−} (75%)	^{38}P	0+		
^{38}Si	14	24	37.99552(11)	1979	63(8) ms	β^{−}, n (25%)	^{37}P	0+		
^{39}Si	14	25	39.00249(15)	1979	41.2(41) ms	β^{−} (67%)	^{39}P	(5/2−)		
^{39}Si	14	25	39.00249(15)	1979	41.2(41) ms	β^{−}, n (33%)	^{38}P	(5/2−)		
^{39}Si	14	25	39.00249(15)	1979	41.2(41) ms	β^{−}, 2n?	^{37}P	(5/2−)		
^{40}Si	14	26	40.00608(13)	1989	31.2(26) ms	β^{−} (62%)	^{40}P	0+		
^{40}Si	14	26	40.00608(13)	1989	31.2(26) ms	β^{−}, n (38%)	^{39}P	0+		
^{40}Si	14	26	40.00608(13)	1989	31.2(26) ms	β^{−}, 2n?	^{38}P	0+		
^{41}Si	14	27	41.01417(32)#	1989	20.0(25) ms	β^{−}, n (>55%)	^{40}P	7/2−#		
^{41}Si	14	27	41.01417(32)#	1989	20.0(25) ms	β^{−} (<45%)	^{41}P	7/2−#		
^{41}Si	14	27	41.01417(32)#	1989	20.0(25) ms	β^{−}, 2n?	^{39}P	7/2−#		
^{42}Si	14	28	42.01808(32)#	1990	15.5(4 (stat), 16 (sys)) ms	β^{−} (51%)	^{42}P	0+		
^{42}Si	14	28	42.01808(32)#	1990	15.5(4 (stat), 16 (sys)) ms	β^{−}, n (48%)	^{41}P	0+		
^{42}Si	14	28	42.01808(32)#	1990	15.5(4 (stat), 16 (sys)) ms	β^{−}, 2n (1%)	^{40}P	0+		
^{43}Si	14	29	43.02612(43)#	2002	13(4 (stat), 2 (sys)) ms	β^{−}, n (52%)	^{42}P	3/2−#		
^{43}Si	14	29	43.02612(43)#	2002	13(4 (stat), 2 (sys)) ms	β^{−} (27%)	^{43}P	3/2−#		
^{43}Si	14	29	43.02612(43)#	2002	13(4 (stat), 2 (sys)) ms	β^{−}, 2n (21%)	^{41}P	3/2−#		
^{44}Si	14	30	44.03147(54)#	2007	4# ms [>360 ns]	β^{−}?	^{44}P	0+		
^{44}Si	14	30	44.03147(54)#	2007	4# ms [>360 ns]	β^{−}, n?	^{43}P	0+		
^{44}Si	14	30	44.03147(54)#	2007	4# ms [>360 ns]	β^{−}, 2n?	^{42}P	0+		
^{45}Si	14	31	45.03982(64)#	2024	4# ms			3/2−#		
^{46}Si	14	32		2024						
This table header & footer:

== Silicon-28 ==
Silicon-28, the most abundant isotope of silicon, is of particular interest in the construction of quantum computers when highly enriched, as the presence of ^{29}Si in a sample of silicon contributes to quantum decoherence. Extremely pure (>99.9998%) samples of ^{28}Si can be produced through selective ionization and deposition of ^{28}Si from silane gas. Due to the extremely high purity that can be obtained in this manner, the Avogadro project sought to develop a new definition of the kilogram by making a 93.75 mm (3.691 in) sphere of the isotope and determining the exact number of atoms in the sample.

Silicon-28 is produced in stars during the alpha process and the oxygen-burning process, and drives the silicon-burning process in massive stars shortly before they go supernova.

== Silicon-29 ==
Silicon-29 is of note as the only stable silicon isotope with a nonzero nuclear spin (I = 1/2). As such, it can be employed in nuclear magnetic resonance and hyperfine transition studies, for example to study the properties of the so-called A-center defect in pure silicon.

== Silicon-34 ==
Silicon-34 is a radioactive isotope with a half-life of 2.8 seconds. In addition to the usual N = 20 closed shell, the nucleus also shows a strong Z = 14 shell closure, making it behave like a doubly magic spherical nucleus, except that it is also located two protons above an island of inversion. Silicon-34 has an unusual "bubble" structure where the proton distribution is less dense at the center than near the surface, as the 2s_{1/2} proton orbital is almost unoccupied in the ground state, unlike in ^{36}S where it is almost full. Silicon-34 is one of the known cluster decay emission particles; it is produced in the decay of ^{242}Cm with a branching ratio of approximately 1×10^{−16}.

== See also ==
Daughter products other than silicon

- Isotopes of phosphorus
- Isotopes of aluminum
- Isotopes of magnesium
- Isotopes of sodium
