= Isotopes of phosphorus =

Isotopes of phosphorus (_{15}P)
Main isotopes			Decay	
Isotope	abundance	half-life (t_{1/2})	mode	product
^{31}P	100%	stable		
^{32}P	trace	14.269 d	β^{−}	^{32}S
^{33}P	trace	25.35 d	β^{−}	^{33}S

Standard atomic weight A_{r}°(P)
- 30.973761998±0.000000005; 30.974±0.001 (abridged)

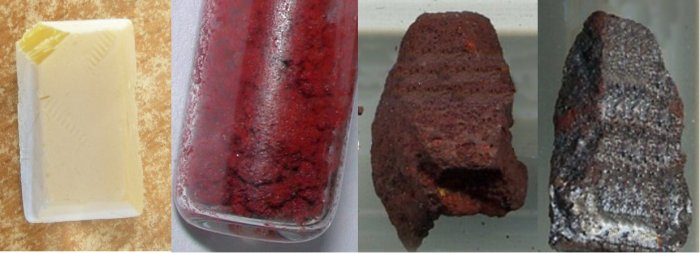
Phosphorus has many allotropes, including white phosphorus (left), red phosphorus (center left, center right), and violet phosphorus (right). See allotropes of phosphorus for more information.

Although phosphorus (_{15}P) has 22 known isotopes from ^{26}P to ^{47}P, only ^{31}P is stable; Phosphorus is thus considered a monoisotopic element. ^{31}P is also the only naturally occurring isotopes of phosphorus, so phosphorus is considered a mononuclidic element as well. The longest-lived radioactive isotopes are ^{33}P with a half-life of 25.35 days and ^{32}P with a half-life of 14.269 days. All others have half-lives of under 2.5 minutes, most under a second.

== List of isotopes ==
Nuclide (Note: ^{m}P – Excited nuclear isomer.)	Z	N	Isotopic mass (Da) (Note: ( ) – Uncertainty (1σ) is given in concise form in parentheses after the corresponding last digits.) (Note: # – Atomic mass marked #: value and uncertainty derived not from purely experimental data, but at least partly from trends from the Mass Surface (TMS).)	Discovery year	Half-life (Note: # – Values marked # are not purely derived from experimental data, but at least partly from trends of neighboring nuclides (TNN).)	Decay mode (Note: Modes of decay: IT: / Isomeric transition; n: / Neutron emission; p: / Proton emission)	Daughter isotope (Note: Bold symbol as daughter – Daughter product is stable.)	Spin and parity (Note: ( ) spin value – Indicates spin with weak assignment arguments.)	Isotopic abundance
Nuclide	Excitation energy			Discovery year	Half-life	Decay mode	Daughter isotope	Spin and parity	Isotopic abundance
^{26}P	15	11	26.011806(11)	1983	43.6(3) ms	β^{+} (62.9%)	^{26}Si	(3)+	
^{26}P	15	11	26.011806(11)	1983	43.6(3) ms	β^{+}, p (35.1%)	^{25}Al	(3)+	
^{26}P	15	11	26.011806(11)	1983	43.6(3) ms	β^{+}, 2p (1.99%)	^{24}Mg	(3)+	
^{26m}P	164.4(1) keV			2017	115(8) ns	IT	^{26}P	(1+)	
^{27}P	15	12	26.9992925(97)	1977	260(80) ms	β^{+} (99.93%)	^{27}Si	1/2+	
^{27}P	15	12	26.9992925(97)	1977	260(80) ms	β^{+}, p (0.07%)	^{26}Al	1/2+	
^{28}P	15	13	27.9923265(12)	1953	270.3(5) ms	β^{+}	^{28}Si	3+	
^{28}P	15	13	27.9923265(12)	1953	270.3(5) ms	β^{+}, p (.0013%)	^{27}Al	3+	
^{28}P	15	13	27.9923265(12)	1953	270.3(5) ms	β^{+}, α (8.6×10^{−4}%)	^{24}Mg	3+	
^{29}P	15	14	28.98180037(39)	1941	4.102(4) s	β^{+}	^{29}Si	1/2+	
^{30}P	15	15	29.978313490(69)	1934	2.5000(17) min	β^{+}	^{30}Si	1+	
^{31}P	15	16	30.97376199768(80)	1920	Stable			1/2+	1.0000
^{32}P	15	17	31.973907643(42)	1934	14.269(7) d	β^{−}	^{32}S	1+	Trace
^{33}P	15	18	32.9717257(12)	1951	25.35(11) d	β^{−}	^{33}S	1/2+	
^{34}P	15	19	33.97364589(87)	1945	12.43(10) s	β^{−}	^{34}S	1+	
^{35}P	15	20	34.9733140(20)	1971	47.3(8) s	β^{−}	^{35}S	1/2+	
^{36}P	15	21	35.978260(14)	1971	5.6(3) s	β^{−}	^{36}S	4−	
^{36}P	15	21	35.978260(14)	1971	5.6(3) s	β^{−}, n?	^{35}S	4−	
^{37}P	15	22	36.979607(41)	1971	2.31(13) s	β^{−}	^{37}S	(1/2+)	
^{37}P	15	22	36.979607(41)	1971	2.31(13) s	β^{−}, n?	^{36}S	(1/2+)	
^{38}P	15	23	37.984303(78)	1971	0.64(14) s	β^{−} (88%)	^{38}S	(2−)	
^{38}P	15	23	37.984303(78)	1971	0.64(14) s	β^{−}, n (12%)	^{37}S	(2−)	
^{39}P	15	24	38.98629(12)	1977	282(24) ms	β^{−} (74%)	^{39}S	(1/2+)	
^{39}P	15	24	38.98629(12)	1977	282(24) ms	β^{−}, n (26%)	^{38}S	(1/2+)	
^{40}P	15	25	39.991262(90)	1979	150(8) ms	β^{−} (84.2%)	^{40}S	(2−,3−)	
^{40}P	15	25	39.991262(90)	1979	150(8) ms	β^{−}, n (15.8%)	^{39}S	(2−,3−)	
^{40}P	15	25	39.991262(90)	1979	150(8) ms	β^{−}, 2n?	^{38}S	(2−,3−)	
^{41}P	15	26	40.99465(13)	1979	101(5) ms	β^{−} (70%)	^{41}S	1/2+#	
^{41}P	15	26	40.99465(13)	1979	101(5) ms	β^{−}, n (30%)	^{40}S	1/2+#	
^{41}P	15	26	40.99465(13)	1979	101(5) ms	β^{−}, 2n?	^{39}S	1/2+#	
^{42}P	15	27	42.00117(10)	1979	48.5(15) ms	β^{−} (50%)	^{42}S		
^{42}P	15	27	42.00117(10)	1979	48.5(15) ms	β^{−}, n (50%)	^{41}S		
^{42}P	15	27	42.00117(10)	1979	48.5(15) ms	β^{−}, 2n?	^{40}S		
^{43}P	15	28	43.00541(32)#	1989	35.8(13) ms	β^{−}, n	^{42}S	(1/2+)	
^{43}P	15	28	43.00541(32)#	1989	35.8(13) ms	β^{−}, 2n ?	^{41}S	(1/2+)	
^{44}P	15	29	44.01193(43)#	1989	18.5(25) ms	β^{−}, n (55%)	^{43}S		
^{44}P	15	29	44.01193(43)#	1989	18.5(25) ms	β^{−} (24%)	^{44}S		
^{44}P	15	29	44.01193(43)#	1989	18.5(25) ms	β^{−}, 2n (21%)	^{42}S		
^{45}P	15	30	45.01713(54)#	1990	24(7 (stat), 9 (sys)) ms	β^{−}, n (79%)	^{44}S	1/2+#	
^{45}P	15	30	45.01713(54)#	1990	24(7 (stat), 9 (sys)) ms	β^{−}, 2n (21%)	^{43}S	1/2+#	
^{46}P	15	31	46.02452(54)#	1990	9# ms [>200 ns]	β^{−}?	^{46}S		
^{46}P	15	31	46.02452(54)#	1990	9# ms [>200 ns]	β^{−}, n?	^{45}S		
^{46}P	15	31	46.02452(54)#	1990	9# ms [>200 ns]	β^{−}, 2n?	^{44}S		
^{47}P	15	32	47.03093(64)#	2018	4# ms [>400 ns]	β^{−}	^{47}S	1/2+#	
^{47}P	15	32	47.03093(64)#	2018	4# ms [>400 ns]	β^{−}, n?	^{46}S	1/2+#	
^{47}P	15	32	47.03093(64)#	2018	4# ms [>400 ns]	β^{−}, 2n?	^{45}S	1/2+#	
This table header & footer:

== Radioactive isotopes ==
=== Phosphorus-32 ===
^{32}P is a radioactive isotope of phosphorus with relative atomic mass 31.973907 Da and half-life of 14.26 days. ^{32}P is a radioactive isotope of phosphorus with beta particle-emitting radiocytotoxic activity. Emitted by ^{32}P, beta particles directly damage cellular DNA and, by ionizing intracellular water to produce several types of cytotoxic free radicals and superoxides, indirectly damage intracellular biological macromolecules, resulting in tumor cell death.

=== Phosphorus-33 ===
Phosphorus-33 is a radioactive isotope of phosphorus; it is produced from sulfur-33. is a pure β-emitter, like ^{32}P, and can be used as an alternative to it in research in molecular biology. Indeed, its longer half-life and especially its lower decay energy make its manipulation simpler in the laboratory. In the medical field, ^{33}P has been used in the treatment of arterial stenosis but is no longer indicated at this time.

== See also ==
- Sulfur isotope biogeochemistry

Daughter products other than phosphorus

- Isotopes of sulfur
- Isotopes of silicon
- Isotopes of aluminum
- Isotopes of magnesium
