= Isotopes of neon =

Isotopes of neon (_{10}Ne)
Main isotopes			Decay	
Isotope	abundance	half-life (t_{1/2})	mode	product
^{20}Ne	90.5%	stable		
^{21}Ne	0.27%	stable		
^{22}Ne	9.25%	stable		

Standard atomic weight A_{r}°(Ne)
- 20.1797±0.0006; 20.180±0.001 (abridged)

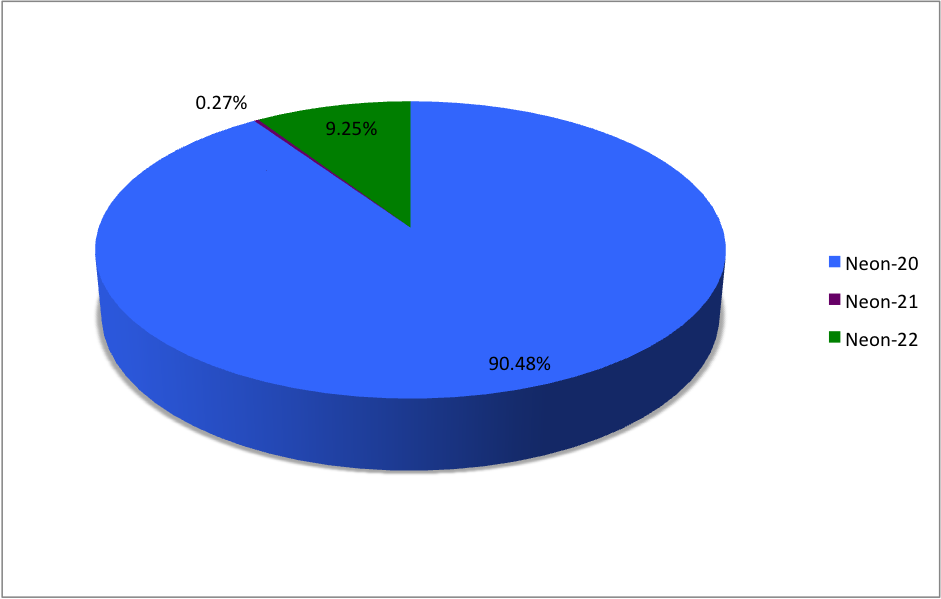
The abundances of the naturally occurring isotopes of neon

Neon (_{10}Ne) naturally occurs as three stable isotopes: ^{20}Ne, ^{21}Ne, and ^{22}Ne. Their stated natural abundances are those measured in air.

In addition, 17 artificial radioisotopes have been discovered, ranging from ^{15}Ne to ^{34}Ne, all short-lived: the most stable is ^{24}Ne with a half-life of 3.38 minutes. All others are under a minute, and most under a second. The isotopes lighter than the stable ones usually decay to fluorine or oxygen, while heavier ones decay to sodium.

== List of isotopes ==
Nuclide	Z	N	Isotopic mass (Da) (Note: ( ) – Uncertainty (1σ) is given in concise form in parentheses after the corresponding last digits.) (Note: # – Atomic mass marked #: value and uncertainty derived not from purely experimental data, but at least partly from trends from the Mass Surface (TMS).)	Discovery year	Half-life [resonance width]	Decay mode (Note: Modes of decay: n: / Neutron emission; p: / Proton emission)	Daughter isotope (Note: Bold symbol as daughter – Daughter product is stable.)	Spin and parity (Note: ( ) spin value – Indicates spin with weak assignment arguments.)	Natural abundance (mole fraction)	
Nuclide	Z	N	Isotopic mass (Da)	Discovery year	Half-life [resonance width]	Decay mode	Daughter isotope	Spin and parity	Normal proportion	Range of variation
^{15}Ne	10	5	15.043170(70)	2014	770(300) ys [590(230) keV]	2p	^{13}O	(3/2−)		
^{16}Ne	10	6	16.025751(22)	1977	> 5.7 zs [< 80 keV]	2p	^{14}O	0+		
^{17}Ne (Note: Has 2 halo protons.)	10	7	17.0177140(4)	1964	109.2(6) ms	β^{+}p (94.4(2.9)%)	^{16}O	1/2−		
^{17}Ne	10	7	17.0177140(4)	1964	109.2(6) ms	β^{+}α (3.51(1)%)	^{13}N	1/2−		
^{17}Ne	10	7	17.0177140(4)	1964	109.2(6) ms	β^{+} (2.1(2.9)%)	^{17}F	1/2−		
^{17}Ne	10	7	17.0177140(4)	1964	109.2(6) ms	β^{+}pα (0.014(4)%)	^{12}C	1/2−		
^{18}Ne	10	8	18.0057087(4)	1954	1.66420(47) s	β^{+}	^{18}F	0+		
^{19}Ne	10	9	19.00188091(17)	1939	17.2569(19) s	β^{+}	^{19}F	1/2+		
^{20}Ne	10	10	19.9924401753(16)	1913	Stable			0+	0.9048(3)	[0.8847, 0.9051]
^{21}Ne	10	11	20.99384669(4)	1928	Stable			3/2+	0.0027(1)	[0.0027, 0.0171]
^{22}Ne	10	12	21.991385114(19)	1913	Stable			0+	0.0925(3)	[0.0920, 0.0996]
^{23}Ne	10	13	22.99446691(11)	1936	37.15(3) s	β^{−}	^{23}Na	5/2+		
^{24}Ne	10	14	23.9936106(6)	1956	3.38(2) min	β^{−}	^{24}Na	0+		
^{25}Ne	10	15	24.997810(30)	1970	602(8) ms	β^{−}	^{25}Na	1/2+		
^{26}Ne	10	16	26.000516(20)	1970	197(2) ms	β^{−} (99.87(3)%)	^{26}Na	0+		
^{26}Ne	10	16	26.000516(20)	1970	197(2) ms	β^{−}n (0.13(3)%)	^{25}Na	0+		
^{27}Ne	10	17	27.007570(100)	1977	30.9(1.1) ms	β^{−} (98.0(5)%)	^{27}Na	(3/2+)		
^{27}Ne	10	17	27.007570(100)	1977	30.9(1.1) ms	β^{−}n (2.0(5)%)	^{26}Na	(3/2+)		
^{27}Ne	10	17	27.007570(100)	1977	30.9(1.1) ms	β^{−}2n ?	^{25}Na	(3/2+)		
^{28}Ne	10	18	28.012130(140)	1979	18.8(2) ms	β^{−} (84.3(1.1)%)	^{28}Na	0+		
^{28}Ne	10	18	28.012130(140)	1979	18.8(2) ms	β^{−}n (12(1)%)	^{27}Na	0+		
^{28}Ne	10	18	28.012130(140)	1979	18.8(2) ms	β^{−}2n (3.7(5)%)	^{26}Na	0+		
^{29}Ne	10	19	29.019750(160)	1985	14.7(4) ms	β^{−} (68.0(5.1)%)	^{29}Na	(3/2−)		
^{29}Ne	10	19	29.019750(160)	1985	14.7(4) ms	β^{−}n (28(5)%)	^{28}Na	(3/2−)		
^{29}Ne	10	19	29.019750(160)	1985	14.7(4) ms	β^{−}2n (4(1)%)	^{27}Na	(3/2−)		
^{30}Ne	10	20	30.024990(270)	1985	7.22(18) ms	β^{−} (78.1(4.6)%)	^{30}Na	0+		
^{30}Ne	10	20	30.024990(270)	1985	7.22(18) ms	β^{−}n (13(4)%)	^{29}Na	0+		
^{30}Ne	10	20	30.024990(270)	1985	7.22(18) ms	β^{−}2n (8.9(2.3)%)	^{28}Na	0+		
^{31}Ne	10	21	31.033470(290)	1996	3.4(8) ms	β^{−}	^{31}Na	(3/2−)		
^{31}Ne	10	21	31.033470(290)	1996	3.4(8) ms	β^{−}n ?	^{30}Na	(3/2−)		
^{31}Ne	10	21	31.033470(290)	1996	3.4(8) ms	β^{−}2n ?	^{29}Na	(3/2−)		
^{32}Ne	10	22	32.039720(540)#	1990	3.5(9) ms	β^{−}	^{32}Na	0+		
^{32}Ne	10	22	32.039720(540)#	1990	3.5(9) ms	β^{−}n ?	^{31}Na	0+		
^{32}Ne	10	22	32.039720(540)#	1990	3.5(9) ms	β^{−}2n ?	^{30}Na	0+		
^{34}Ne	10	24	34.056730(550)#	2002	2 ms# [> 1.5 μs]	β^{−} ?	^{34}Na	0+		
^{34}Ne	10	24	34.056730(550)#	2002	2 ms# [> 1.5 μs]	β^{−}2n ?	^{32}Na	0+		
^{34}Ne	10	24	34.056730(550)#	2002	2 ms# [> 1.5 μs]	β^{−}n ?	^{33}Na	0+		
This table header & footer:

== See also ==
Daughter products other than neon

- Isotopes of sodium
- Isotopes of fluorine
- Isotopes of oxygen
- Isotopes of nitrogen
- Isotopes of carbon
