= Isotopes of sodium =

Isotopes of sodium (_{11}Na)
| Main isotopes | | | Decay | |
| Isotope | abundance | half-life (t_{1/2}) | mode | product |
|---|---|---|---|---|
| ^{22}Na | trace | 2.6019 y | β^{+} | ^{22}Ne |
| ^{23}Na | 100% | stable | | |
| ^{24}Na | trace | 14.956 h | β^{−} | ^{24}Mg |

Standard atomic weight A_{r}°(Na)
- 22.98976928±0.00000002; 22.990±0.001 (abridged)

There are 21 known isotopes of sodium (_{11}Na), ranging from ^{17}Na to ^{39}Na (except for ^{36}Na and ^{38}Na), and five isomers. ^{23}Na is the only stable (and the only primordial) isotope, making sodium a monoisotopic (and mononuclidic) element. Sodium has two radioactive cosmogenic isotopes (^{22}Na, with a half-life of 2.6019 years and ^{24}Na, with a half-life of 14.956 hours). With the exception of those two isotopes, all other isotopes have half-lives under a minute, most under a second.

Acute neutron radiation exposure (e.g., from a nuclear criticality accident) converts some of the stable ^{23}Na in human blood plasma to ^{24}Na. The neutron radiation dose absorbed by the patient can be assessed by measuring the concentration of the radioisotope.

^{22}Na is a positron-emitting isotope with a relatively long half-life, about 2.6 years. It is used to create test-objects and point-sources for positron emission tomography.

== List of isotopes ==
| Nuclide (Note: ^{m}Na – Excited nuclear isomer.) | Z | N | Isotopic mass (Da) (Note: ( ) – Uncertainty (1σ) is given in concise form in parentheses after the corresponding last digits.) (Note: # – Atomic mass marked #: value and uncertainty derived not from purely experimental data, but at least partly from trends from the Mass Surface (TMS).) | Discovery year | Half-life (Note: # – Values marked # are not purely derived from experimental data, but at least partly from trends of neighboring nuclides (TNN).) | Decay mode (Note: Modes of decay: IT: / Isomeric transition; n: / Neutron emission; p: / Proton emission) | Daughter isotope (Note: Bold symbol as daughter – Daughter product is stable.) | Spin and parity (Note: ( ) spin value – Indicates spin with weak assignment arguments.) | Isotopic abundance |
| Nuclide | Excitation energy | | | Discovery year | Half-life | Decay mode | Daughter isotope | Spin and parity | Isotopic abundance |
|---|---|---|---|---|---|---|---|---|---|
| ^{17}Na | 11 | 6 | 17.037270(60) | 2017 | | p | ^{16}Ne | (1/2+) | |
| ^{18}Na | 11 | 7 | 18.02688(10) | 2004 | 1.3(4) zs | p ? (Note: Decay mode shown has been observed, but its intensity is not known experimentally.) | ^{17}Ne | 1−# | |
| ^{19}Na | 11 | 8 | 19.013880(11) | 1969 | > 1 as | p | ^{18}Ne | (5/2+) | |
| ^{20}Na | 11 | 9 | 20.0073543(12) | 1950 | 447.9(2.3) ms | β^{+} (75.0(4)%) | ^{20}Ne | 2+ | |
| ^{20}Na | 11 | 9 | 20.0073543(12) | 1950 | 447.9(2.3) ms | β^{+}α (25.0(4)%) | ^{16}O | 2+ | |
| ^{21}Na | 11 | 10 | 20.99765446(5) | 1940 | 22.4550(54) s | β^{+} | ^{21}Ne | 3/2+ | |
| ^{22}Na | 11 | 11 | 21.99443755(14) | 1935 | 2.6019(6) y (Note: Note that NUBASE2020 uses the tropical year to convert between years and other units of time, not the Gregorian year. The relationship between years and other time units in NUBASE2020 is as follows: 1 y = 365.2422 d = 31 556 926 s) | β^{+} (90.57(8)%) | ^{22}Ne | 3+ | Trace (Note: Cosmogenic nuclide) |
| ^{22}Na | 11 | 11 | 21.99443755(14) | 1935 | 2.6019(6) y | ε (9.43(6)%) | ^{22}Ne | 3+ | Trace |
| ^{22m}Na | 583.05(10) keV | | | 1958 | 243(2) ns | IT | ^{22}Na | 1+ | |
| ^{23}Na | 11 | 12 | 22.9897692820(19) | 1918 | Stable | | | 3/2+ | 1.0000 |
| ^{24}Na | 11 | 13 | 23.990963012(18) | 1934 | 14.9560(15) h | β^{−} | ^{24}Mg | 4+ | Trace |
| ^{24m}Na | 472.2074(8) keV | | | 1956 | 20.18(10) ms | IT (99.95%) | ^{24}Na | 1+ | |
| ^{24m}Na | 472.2074(8) keV | | | 1956 | 20.18(10) ms | β^{−} (0.05%) | ^{24}Mg | 1+ | |
| ^{25}Na | 11 | 14 | 24.9899540(13) | 1943 | 59.1(6) s | β^{−} | ^{25}Mg | 5/2+ | |
| ^{26}Na | 11 | 15 | 25.992635(4) | 1958 | 1.07128(25) s | β^{−} | ^{26}Mg | 3+ | |
| ^{26m}Na | 82.4(4) keV | | | (1987) (Note: Only published in a conference proceeding and not a refereed journal.) | 4.35(16) μs | IT | ^{26}Na | 1+ | |
| ^{27}Na | 11 | 16 | 26.994076(4) | 1968 | 301(6) ms | β^{−} (99.902(24)%) | ^{27}Mg | 5/2+ | |
| ^{27}Na | 11 | 16 | 26.994076(4) | 1968 | 301(6) ms | β^{−}n (0.098(24)%) | ^{26}Mg | 5/2+ | |
| ^{28}Na | 11 | 17 | 27.998939(11) | 1969 | 33.1(1.3) ms | β^{−} (99.42(12)%) | ^{28}Mg | 1+ | |
| ^{28}Na | 11 | 17 | 27.998939(11) | 1969 | 33.1(1.3) ms | β^{−}n (0.58(12)%) | ^{27}Mg | 1+ | |
| ^{29}Na | 11 | 18 | 29.002877(8) | 1969 | 43.2(4) ms | β^{−} (78%) | ^{29}Mg | 3/2+ | |
| ^{29}Na | 11 | 18 | 29.002877(8) | 1969 | 43.2(4) ms | β^{−}n (22(3)%) | ^{28}Mg | 3/2+ | |
| ^{29}Na | 11 | 18 | 29.002877(8) | 1969 | 43.2(4) ms | β^{−}2n ? | ^{27}Mg | 3/2+ | |
| ^{30}Na | 11 | 19 | 30.009098(5) | 1969 | 45.9(7) ms | β^{−} (70.2(2.2)%) | ^{30}Mg | 2+ | |
| ^{30}Na | 11 | 19 | 30.009098(5) | 1969 | 45.9(7) ms | β^{−}n (28.6(2.2)%) | ^{29}Mg | 2+ | |
| ^{30}Na | 11 | 19 | 30.009098(5) | 1969 | 45.9(7) ms | β^{−}2n (1.24(19)%) | ^{28}Mg | 2+ | |
| ^{30}Na | 11 | 19 | 30.009098(5) | 1969 | 45.9(7) ms | β^{−}α (5.5(2)%×10^{−5}) | ^{26}Ne | 2+ | |
| ^{31}Na | 11 | 20 | 31.013147(15) | 1969 | 16.8(3) ms | β^{−} (> 63.2(3.5)%) | ^{31}Mg | 3/2+ | |
| ^{31}Na | 11 | 20 | 31.013147(15) | 1969 | 16.8(3) ms | β^{−}n (36.0(3.5)%) | ^{30}Mg | 3/2+ | |
| ^{31}Na | 11 | 20 | 31.013147(15) | 1969 | 16.8(3) ms | β^{−}2n (0.73(9)%) | ^{29}Mg | 3/2+ | |
| ^{31}Na | 11 | 20 | 31.013147(15) | 1969 | 16.8(3) ms | β^{−}3n (< 0.05%) | ^{28}Mg | 3/2+ | |
| ^{32}Na | 11 | 21 | 32.020010(40) | 1972 | 12.9(3) ms | β^{−} (66.4(6.2)%) | ^{32}Mg | (3−) | |
| ^{32}Na | 11 | 21 | 32.020010(40) | 1972 | 12.9(3) ms | β^{−}n (26(6)%) | ^{31}Mg | (3−) | |
| ^{32}Na | 11 | 21 | 32.020010(40) | 1972 | 12.9(3) ms | β^{−}2n (7.6(1.5)%) | ^{30}Mg | (3−) | |
| ^{32m}Na | 625 keV | | | 2023 | 24(2) μs | IT | ^{32}Na | (0+,6−) | |
| ^{33}Na | 11 | 22 | 33.02553(48) | 1972 | 8.2(4) ms | β^{−}n (47(6)%) | ^{32}Mg | (3/2+) | |
| ^{33}Na | 11 | 22 | 33.02553(48) | 1972 | 8.2(4) ms | β^{−} (40.0(6.7)%) | ^{33}Mg | (3/2+) | |
| ^{33}Na | 11 | 22 | 33.02553(48) | 1972 | 8.2(4) ms | β^{−}2n (13(3)%) | ^{31}Mg | (3/2+) | |
| ^{34}Na | 11 | 23 | 34.03401(64) | 1983 | 5.5(1.0) ms | β^{−}2n (~50%) | ^{32}Mg | 1+ | |
| ^{34}Na | 11 | 23 | 34.03401(64) | 1983 | 5.5(1.0) ms | β^{−} (~35%) | ^{34}Mg | 1+ | |
| ^{34}Na | 11 | 23 | 34.03401(64) | 1983 | 5.5(1.0) ms | β^{−}n (~15%) | ^{33}Mg | 1+ | |
| ^{35}Na | 11 | 24 | 35.04061(72)# | 1983 | 1.5(5) ms | β^{−} | ^{35}Mg | 3/2+# | |
| ^{35}Na | 11 | 24 | 35.04061(72)# | 1983 | 1.5(5) ms | β^{−}n ? | ^{34}Mg | 3/2+# | |
| ^{35}Na | 11 | 24 | 35.04061(72)# | 1983 | 1.5(5) ms | β^{−}2n ? | ^{33}Mg | 3/2+# | |
| ^{37}Na | 11 | 26 | 37.05704(74)# | 2002 | 1# ms [> 1.5 μs] | β^{−} ? | ^{37}Mg | 3/2+# | |
| ^{37}Na | 11 | 26 | 37.05704(74)# | 2002 | 1# ms [> 1.5 μs] | β^{−}n ? | ^{36}Mg | 3/2+# | |
| ^{37}Na | 11 | 26 | 37.05704(74)# | 2002 | 1# ms [> 1.5 μs] | β^{−}2n ? | ^{35}Mg | 3/2+# | |
| ^{39}Na | 11 | 28 | 39.07512(80)# | 2022 | 1# ms [> 400 ns] | β^{−}n ? | ^{38}Mg | 3/2+# | |
| ^{39}Na | 11 | 28 | 39.07512(80)# | 2022 | 1# ms [> 400 ns] | β^{−}2n ? | ^{37}Mg | 3/2+# | |
This table header & footer:

== Sodium-22 ==
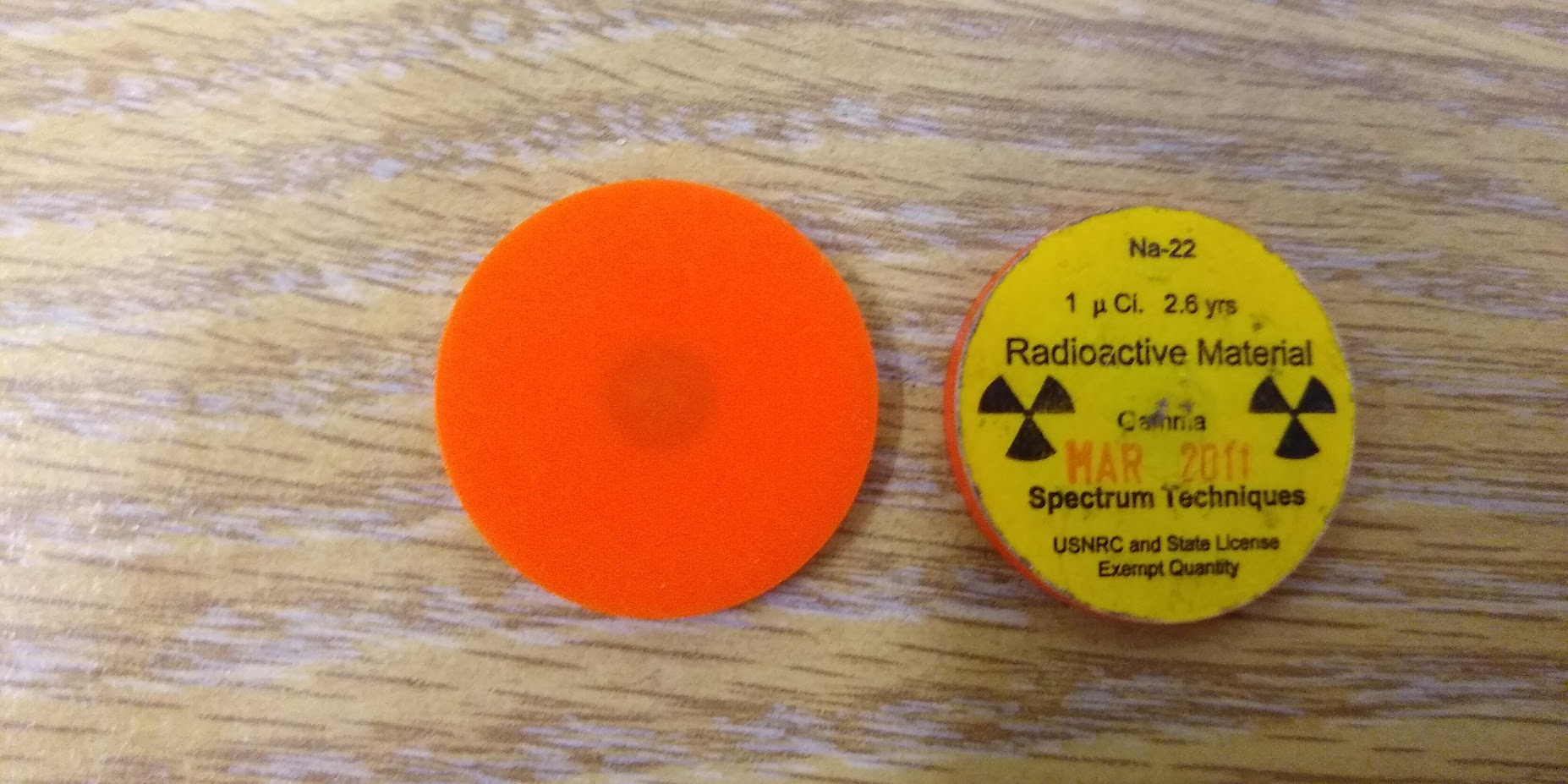
Disk containing 1 μCi of sodium-22

Sodium-22 is a radioactive isotope of sodium, undergoing positron emission to ^{22}Ne with a half-life of 2.6019 years. ^{22}Na is being investigated as an efficient generator of "cold positrons" (antimatter) to produce muons for catalyzing fusion of deuterium. It is also commonly used as a positron source in positron annihilation spectroscopy.

== Sodium-23 ==
Sodium-23 is the sole natural isotope of sodium, with an atomic mass of 22.98976928. Because of this, sodium-23 is used in nuclear magnetic resonance in various research fields, including materials science and battery research. Sodium-23 relaxation has applications in studying cation-biomolecule interactions, intracellular and extracellular sodium, ion transport in batteries, and quantum information processing.

== Sodium-24 ==
Sodium-24 is radioactive and is generally created from common sodium-23 by neutron activation. With a half-life of 14.956 hours, ^{24}Na decays to ^{24}Mg by emission of an electron and, almost always, two gamma rays.

Exposure of the human body to intense neutron radiation creates ^{24}Na in the blood plasma. Measurements of its quantity can be done to determine the absorbed radiation dose of a patient. This can be used to determine the medical treatment required.

When sodium is used as coolant in fast breeder reactors, radioactive ^{24}Na is created within the coolant. When the ^{24}Na decays, magnesium forms and builds up in the coolant. Since the half-life is short, the ^{24}Na portion of the coolant ceases to be radioactive within a few days after removal from the reactor. Leakage of the hot sodium from the primary loop may cause radioactive fires, as it can ignite in contact with air (and explodes in contact with water). For this reason, the primary cooling loop is placed within the containment vessel.

Sodium has been proposed as a casing for a salted bomb, as it would convert to ^{24}Na and produce intense gamma-ray emissions for a few days.

== See also ==
Daughter products other than sodium

- Isotopes of magnesium
- Isotopes of neon
- Isotopes of oxygen
