= Isotopes of fluorine =

Isotopes of fluorine (_{9}F)
| Main isotopes | | | Decay | |
| Isotope | abundance | half-life (t_{1/2}) | mode | product |
|---|---|---|---|---|
| ^{17}F | synth | 64.37 s | β^{+} | ^{17}O |
| ^{18}F | trace | 109.734 min | β^{+} | ^{18}O |
| ^{19}F | 100% | stable | | |

Standard atomic weight A_{r}°(F)
- 18.998403162±0.000000005; 18.998±0.001 (abridged)

Fluorine (_{9}F) has 19 known isotopes ranging from ^{13}F to ^{31}F and two isomers (^{18m}F and ^{26m}F). Only fluorine-19 is stable and naturally occurring in more than trace quantities; therefore, fluorine is a monoisotopic and a mononuclidic element.

The longest-lived radioisotope is ^{18}F with a half-life of 109.734 minutes, followed by ^{17}F with 64.37 seconds. These unstable isotopes participate in the CNO cycle within stars. All other fluorine isotopes have half-lives of less than 12 seconds, and most of those less than 1/2 second.

== List of isotopes ==
| Nuclide (Note: ^{m}F – Excited nuclear isomer.) | Z | N | Isotopic mass (Da) (Note: ( ) – Uncertainty (1σ) is given in concise form in parentheses after the corresponding last digits.) (Note: # – Atomic mass marked #: value and uncertainty derived not from purely experimental data, but at least partly from trends from the Mass Surface (TMS).) | Discovery year | Half-life (Note: # – Values marked # are not purely derived from experimental data, but at least partly from trends of neighboring nuclides (TNN).) | Decay mode (Note: Modes of decay: EC: / Electron capture; IT: / Isomeric transition; n: / Neutron emission; p: / Proton emission) | Daughter isotope (Note: Bold symbol as daughter – Daughter product is stable.) | Spin and parity (Note: ( ) spin value – Indicates spin with weak assignment arguments.) | Isotopic abundance |
| Nuclide | Excitation energy | | | Discovery year | Half-life | Decay mode | Daughter isotope | Spin and parity | Isotopic abundance |
|---|---|---|---|---|---|---|---|---|---|
| ^{13}F | 9 | 4 | 13.045120(540)# | 2021 | | p ? | ^{12}O | 1/2+# | |
| ^{14}F | 9 | 5 | 14.034320(40) | 2010 | 500(60) ys [910(100) keV] | p ? | ^{13}O | 2− | |
| ^{15}F | 9 | 6 | 15.017785(15) | 1978 | 1.1(3) zs [376 keV] | p | ^{14}O | 1/2+ | |
| ^{16}F | 9 | 7 | 16.011460(6) | 1964 | 21(5) zs [21.3(5.1) keV] | p | ^{15}O | 0− | |
| ^{17}F (Note: Intermediate product of various CNO cycles in stellar nucleosynthesis as part of the process producing helium from hydrogen) | 9 | 8 | 17.00209524(27) | 1934 | 64.370(27) s | β^{+} | ^{17}O | 5/2+ | |
| ^{18}F (Note: Has medicinal uses) | 9 | 9 | 18.0009373(5) | 1937 | 109.734(8) min | β^{+} | ^{18}O | 1+ | Trace |
| ^{18m}F | 1121.36(15) keV | | | 1959 | 162(7) ns | IT | ^{18}F | 5+ | |
| ^{19}F | 9 | 10 | 18.998403162067(883) | 1920 | Stable | | | 1/2+ | 1.0000 |
| ^{20}F | 9 | 11 | 19.99998125(3) | 1935 | 11.0062(80) s | β^{−} | ^{20}Ne | 2+ | |
| ^{21}F | 9 | 12 | 20.9999489(19) | 1955 | 4.158(20) s | β^{−} | ^{21}Ne | 5/2+ | |
| ^{22}F | 9 | 13 | 22.002999(13) | 1965 | 4.23(4) s | β^{−} (> 89%) | ^{22}Ne | (4+) | |
| ^{22}F | 9 | 13 | 22.002999(13) | 1965 | 4.23(4) s | β^{−}n (< 11%) | ^{21}Ne | (4+) | |
| ^{23}F | 9 | 14 | 23.003530(40) | 1970 | 2.23(14) s | β^{−} (> 86%) | ^{23}Ne | 5/2+ | |
| ^{23}F | 9 | 14 | 23.003530(40) | 1970 | 2.23(14) s | β^{−}n (< 14%) | ^{22}Ne | 5/2+ | |
| ^{24}F | 9 | 15 | 24.008100(100) | 1970 | 384(16) ms | β^{−} (> 94.1%) | ^{24}Ne | 3+ | |
| ^{24}F | 9 | 15 | 24.008100(100) | 1970 | 384(16) ms | β^{−}n (< 5.9%) | ^{23}Ne | 3+ | |
| ^{25}F | 9 | 16 | 25.012170(100) | 1970 | 80(9) ms | β^{−} (76.9(4.5)%) | ^{25}Ne | (5/2+) | |
| ^{25}F | 9 | 16 | 25.012170(100) | 1970 | 80(9) ms | β^{−}n (23.1(4.5)%) | ^{24}Ne | (5/2+) | |
| ^{25}F | 9 | 16 | 25.012170(100) | 1970 | 80(9) ms | β^{−}2n ? | ^{23}Ne | (5/2+) | |
| ^{26}F | 9 | 17 | 26.020050(110) | 1979 | 8.2(9) ms | β^{−} (86.5(4.0)%) | ^{26}Ne | 1+ | |
| ^{26}F | 9 | 17 | 26.020050(110) | 1979 | 8.2(9) ms | β^{−}n (13.5(4.0)%) | ^{25}Ne | 1+ | |
| ^{26}F | 9 | 17 | 26.020050(110) | 1979 | 8.2(9) ms | β^{−}2n ? | ^{24}Ne | 1+ | |
| ^{26m}F | 643.4(1) keV | | | 2013 | 2.2(1) ms | IT (82(11)%) | ^{26}F | (4+) | |
| ^{26m}F | 643.4(1) keV | | | 2013 | 2.2(1) ms | β^{−}n (12(8)%) | ^{25}Ne | (4+) | |
| ^{26m}F | 643.4(1) keV | | | 2013 | 2.2(1) ms | β^{−} ? | ^{26}Ne | (4+) | |
| ^{27}F | 9 | 18 | 27.026980(130) | 1981 | 5.0(2) ms | β^{−}n (77(21)%) | ^{26}Ne | 5/2+# | |
| ^{27}F | 9 | 18 | 27.026980(130) | 1981 | 5.0(2) ms | β^{−} (23(21)%) | ^{27}Ne | 5/2+# | |
| ^{27}F | 9 | 18 | 27.026980(130) | 1981 | 5.0(2) ms | β^{−}2n ? | ^{25}Ne | 5/2+# | |
| ^{28}F | 9 | 19 | 28.035860(130) | 2012 | 46 zs | n | ^{27}F | (4−) | |
| ^{29}F | 9 | 20 | 29.043100(560) | 1989 | 2.5(3) ms | β^{−}n (60(40)%) | ^{28}Ne | (5/2+) | |
| ^{29}F | 9 | 20 | 29.043100(560) | 1989 | 2.5(3) ms | β^{−} (40(40)%) | ^{29}Ne | (5/2+) | |
| ^{29}F | 9 | 20 | 29.043100(560) | 1989 | 2.5(3) ms | β^{−}2n ? | ^{27}Ne | (5/2+) | |
| ^{30}F | 9 | 21 | 30.05256(54)# | 2024 | 0.96+0.56 −0.41 zs | n | ^{29}F | | |
| ^{31}F | 9 | 22 | 31.06020(570)# | 1999 | 2 ms# [> 260 ns] | β^{−} ? | ^{31}Ne | 5/2+# | |
| ^{31}F | 9 | 22 | 31.06020(570)# | 1999 | 2 ms# [> 260 ns] | β^{−}n ? | ^{30}Ne | 5/2+# | |
| ^{31}F | 9 | 22 | 31.06020(570)# | 1999 | 2 ms# [> 260 ns] | β^{−}2n ? | ^{29}Ne | 5/2+# | |
This table header & footer:

== Fluorine-18 ==
Of the unstable nuclides of fluorine, ^{18}F has the longest half-life, 109.734(8) min. It decays to ^{18}O via β^{+} decay. For this reason ^{18}F is a commercially important source of positrons. Its major value is in the production of the radiopharmaceutical fludeoxyglucose, used in positron emission tomography in medicine.

Fluorine-18 is the second lightest unstable nuclide (after beryllium-8, with 4 protons and 4 neutrons) with equal numbers of protons and neutrons and lightest such with an odd atomic number, having 9 of each. (See also the parity discussion of nuclide stability.)

== Fluorine-19 ==
Fluorine-19 is the only stable isotope of fluorine. Its abundance is 100%; no other isotopes of fluorine exist in significant quantities. Its binding energy is 147801.3648(38) keV. Fluorine-19 is NMR-active with a spin of 1/2+, so it is used in fluorine-19 NMR spectroscopy.

== Isomers ==
Only two nuclear isomers (long-lived excited nuclear states), fluorine-18m and fluorine-26m, have been characterized. The half-life of ^{18m}F before it undergoes isomeric transition is 162(7) nanoseconds. This is less than the decay half-life of any of the particle-bound fluorine radioisotope nuclear ground states. The half-life of ^{26m}F is 2.2(1) milliseconds; it decays mainly to its ground state of ^{26}F or (rarely, via beta-minus decay) to one of high excited states of ^{26}Ne with delayed neutron emission.

== See also ==
Daughter products other than fluorine

- Isotopes of neon
- Isotopes of oxygen

== Sources ==
- Chisté, V.; Bé, M. M. (2011). "F-18" (PDF). In Bé, M. M.; Coursol, N.; Duchemin, B.; Lagoutine, F.; et al. (eds.). Table de radionucléides (Report). CEA (Commissariat à l'énergie atomique et aux énergies alternatives), LIST, LNE-LNHB (Laboratoire National Henri Becquerel/Commissariat à l'Energie Atomique). Archived from the original (PDF) on 11 August 2020.
