= Island of inversion =

Chart of half-lives of known nuclides

An island of inversion is a region of the chart of nuclides in which isotopes have enhanced stability in a sea of mostly very unstable nuclei at the edge of the nuclear map. Each island contains isotopes with a non-standard ordering of single particle levels in the nuclear shell model. Such an area was first described in 1975 by French physicists carrying out spectroscopic mass measurements of exotic isotopes of lithium and sodium. Since then, further studies have shown that at least five such regions exist. These are centered on five neutron-rich nuclides: ^{11}Li, ^{20}C, ^{31}Na, ^{42}Si, and ^{64}Cr. Because there are five known islands of inversion, physicists have suggested renaming the phenomenon "archipelago of islands of shell breaking". Studies with the purpose of defining the edges of this region are ongoing.

== See also ==
- Table of nuclides
- Periodic table and Extended periodic table
- Island of stability
