= Mononuclidic element =

Related to Periodic Table

Mononuclidic and monoisotopic (19 elements) Two mononuclidic, but radioactive elements (bismuth and protactinium)

A mononuclidic element or monotopic element is one of the 21 chemical elements that is found naturally on Earth essentially as a single nuclide (which may, or may not, be a stable nuclide). This single nuclide will have a characteristic atomic mass. Thus, the element's natural isotopic abundance is dominated by one isotope that is either stable or very long-lived. There are 19 elements in the first category (which are both monoisotopic and mononuclidic), and 2 (bismuth (Note: Until 2003, ^{209}Bi was thought to be in the first category. It was then found to have a half-life on the order of 10^{19} years, about a billion times the age of the universe. See Bismuth) and protactinium) in the second category (mononuclidic but not monoisotopic, since they have zero, not one, stable nuclides). A list of the 21 mononuclidic elements is given at the end of this article.

Of the 26 monoisotopic elements that, by definition, have only one stable isotope, seven are not considered mononuclidic, due to the presence of a significant fraction of a very long-lived (primordial) radioisotope. These elements are vanadium, rubidium, indium, lanthanum, europium, lutetium, and rhenium.

== Use in metrology ==
Many units of measurement were historically, or are still, defined with reference to the properties of specific substances that, in many cases, occurred in nature as mixes of multiple isotopes, for example:

Unit	Dimension	Reference substance	Relevant property	Number of common isotopes	Current (2022) status
Second	Time	Caesium	Hyperfine transition frequency	1	Still in use and one of the 7 SI base units
Metre	Length	Krypton	Transition wavelength	6	Redefined in 1983
Multiple	Temperature	Water	Melting point, boiling point, and triple point	2 of hydrogen and 3 of oxygen	Redefined in 2019 or defunct
Calorie and British thermal unit	Energy	Water	Specific heat capacity	2 of hydrogen and 3 of oxygen	Calorie redefined in terms of the joule, BTU still in use. Neither unit is part of, or recommended for use in, the SI
Mole	Amount of substance	Carbon	Atomic mass	3	Redefined in 2019
Dalton	Mass	Carbon	Atomic mass	3	Still in use and accepted for use in (but not part of) the SI
Candela	Luminous intensity	Platinum	Luminance at melting point	6	Redefined in 1979
Millimetre of mercury	Pressure	Mercury	Density	7	Redefined in terms of the pascal, not part of, or recommended for use in, the SI

Since samples taken from different natural sources can have subtly different isotopic ratios, the relevant properties can differ between samples. If the definition simply refers to a substance without addressing the isotopic composition, this can lead to some level of ambiguity in the definition and variation in practical realizations of the unit by different laboratories, as was observed with the kelvin before 2007. If the definition refers only to one isotope (as that of the dalton does) or to a specific isotope ratio, e.g. Vienna Standard Mean Ocean Water, this removes a source of ambiguity and variation, but adds layers of technical difficulty (preparing samples of a desired isotopic ratio) and uncertainty (regarding how much an actual reference sample differs from the nominal ratio). The use of mononuclidic elements as reference material sidesteps these issues and notably the only substance referenced in the most recent iteration of the SI is caesium, a mononuclidic element.

Mononuclidic elements are also of scientific importance because their atomic weights can be measured to high accuracy, since there is minimal uncertainty associated with the isotopic abundances present in a given sample. Another way of stating this, is that, for these elements, the standard atomic weight and (isotopic) atomic mass are the same.

In practice, only 11 of the mononuclidic elements are used in standard atomic weight metrology. These are aluminium, bismuth, caesium, cobalt, gold, manganese, phosphorus, scandium, sodium, terbium, and thorium.

In nuclear magnetic resonance spectroscopy (NMR), the three most sensitive stable nuclei are hydrogen-1 (^{1}H), fluorine-19 (^{19}F) and phosphorus-31 (^{31}P). Fluorine and phosphorus are monoisotopic, with hydrogen nearly so. ^{1}H NMR, ^{19}F NMR and ^{31}P NMR allow for identification and study of compounds containing these elements.

== Contamination by unstable trace isotopes ==
Trace concentrations of unstable isotopes of some mononuclidic elements are found in natural samples. For example, beryllium-10 (^{10}Be), with a half-life of 1.387 million years, is produced by cosmic rays in the Earth's upper atmosphere; iodine-129 (^{129}I), with a half-life of 16.1 million years, is produced by various cosmogenic and nuclear mechanisms; caesium-137 (^{137}Cs), with a half-life of 30.04 years, is generated by nuclear fission. Such isotopes are used in a variety of analytical and forensic applications.

== List of the 21 mononuclidic elements ==
Element	Most stable	Z (p)	N (n)	Isotopic mass (Da)	Half-life	Next most stable	N (n)	Half-life
beryllium	^{9}Be	4	5	9.012 183 06(8)	Stable	^{10}Be	6	1.387(12)×10^{6} y
fluorine	^{19}F	9	10	18.998 403 1621(9)	Stable	^{18}F	9	109.734(8) min
sodium	^{23}Na	11	12	22.989 769 2820(19)	Stable	^{22}Na	11	2.6019(6) y
aluminium	^{27}Al	13	14	26.981 538 41(5)	Stable	^{26}Al	13	7.17(24)×10^{5} y
phosphorus	^{31}P	15	16	30.973 761 9977(8)	Stable	^{33}P	18	25.35(11) d
scandium	^{45}Sc	21	24	44.955 907 1(7)	Stable	^{46}Sc	25	83.757(14) d
manganese	^{55}Mn	25	30	54.938 043 04(28)	Stable	^{53}Mn	28	3.7(4)×10^{6} y
cobalt	^{59}Co	27	32	58.933 193 5(4)	Stable	^{60}Co	33	5.2714(6) y
arsenic	^{75}As	33	42	74.921 594 6(9)	Stable	^{73}As	40	80.30(6) d
yttrium	^{89}Y	39	50	88.905 838 2(4)	Stable	^{88}Y	49	106.629(24) d
niobium	^{93}Nb	41	52	92.906 3732(16)	Stable	^{92}Nb	51	3.47(24)×10^{7} y
rhodium	^{103}Rh	45	58	102.905 4941(25)	Stable	^{101}Rh	57	4.07(5) y
iodine	^{127}I	53	74	126.904 473(4)	Stable	^{129}I	76	1.614(12)×10^{7} y
caesium	^{133}Cs	55	78	132.905 451 959(9)	Stable	^{135}Cs	80	1.33(19)×10^{6} y
praseodymium	^{141}Pr	59	82	140.907 6596(16)	Stable	^{143}Pr	84	13.57(2) d
terbium	^{159}Tb	65	94	158.925 3537(12)	Stable	^{158}Tb	93	180(11) y
holmium	^{165}Ho	67	98	164.930 329 1(8)	Observationally stable	^{163}Ho	96	4570(25) y
thulium	^{169}Tm	69	100	168.934 219 0(8)	Observationally stable	^{171}Tm	102	1.92(1) y
gold	^{197}Au	79	118	196.966 570 1(6)	Observationally stable	^{195}Au	116	186.01(6) d
bismuth	^{209}Bi	83	126	208.980 3986(15)	2.01(8)×10^{19} y	^{210m}Bi	127	3.04(6)×10^{6} y
protactinium	^{231}Pa	91	140	231.035 8825(19)	3.265(20)×10^{4} y	^{233}Pa	142	26.975(13) d

== See also ==
- Primordial element
- List of nuclides - Table of nuclides sorted by half-life
- Table of nuclides
- Isotope geochemistry
- Radionuclide
- List of elements by stability of isotopes
