= Phosphorus-32 =

Radioactive isotope of phosphorus

General
- Symbol: ^{32}P
- Names: phosphorus-32
- Protons (Z): 15
- Neutrons (N): 17

Nuclide data
- Natural abundance: trace
- Half-life (t_{1/2}): 14.269 d
- Isotope mass: 31.9739076 Da
- Spin: 1+
- Excess energy: −24304.88 keV
- Decay products: ^{32}S

Decay modes
- Decay mode: Decay energy (MeV)
- Beta emission: 1.711

Phosphorus-32 (^{32}P) is a radioactive isotope of phosphorus, containing one more neutron than the common and stable isotope of phosphorus, phosphorus-31.

Phosphorus is found in many organic molecules, and so, phosphorus-32 has many applications in medicine, biochemistry, and molecular biology where it can be used to trace phosphorylated molecules (for example, in elucidating metabolic pathways) and radioactively label DNA and RNA.

== Decay ==
Phosphorus-32 has a half-life of 14.269 days and decays into sulfur-32 by beta decay, as shown in this nuclear equation:

^{32}_{15}P	→	^{32}_{16}S^{1+}	+	e^{−}	+	ν̅_{e}

1.711 MeV of energy is released from this decay. The kinetic energy of the electron varies with an average of approximately 0.5 MeV and the remainder of the energy is carried by the nearly undetectable electron antineutrino. In comparison to other beta radiation-emitting nuclides, the electron is moderately energetic. It is on average stopped by about 1m of air or 5mm of acrylic glass.

The sulfur-32 nucleus produced is in the ground state, so there is no nuclear gamma ray emission, which is unusual for a decay of this energy.

== Production ==
Phosphorus-32 only exists naturally on earth in very small amounts, and its short half-life means useful quantities have to be produced synthetically. ^{32}P can be generated synthetically by irradiation of sulfur-32 with moderately fast neutrons as shown in this nuclear equation:

^{32}_{16}S	+	n	→	^{32}_{15}P +	p

The ^{32}S nucleus captures the neutron and emits a proton, reducing the atomic number by one while maintaining the mass number of 32. This reaction has also been used to determine the yield of nuclear weapons. Other common ways to synthesize ^{32}P include the following reactions:

- ^{35}Cl(n,α)^{32}P
- ^{35}S(n,p)^{32}P
- ^{31}P(n,γ)^{32}P

== Uses ==
Phosphorus is abundant in biological systems and, as a radioactive isotope, is almost chemically identical with stable isotopes of the same element. Phosphorus-32 can be used to label biological molecules and detect malignant tumors, as specific preparations of it accumulate more in cancer cells than in healthy cells. The beta radiation emitted by the phosphorus-32 is sufficiently penetrating to be detected outside the organism or tissue which is being analysed.

=== Biochemistry and molecular biology ===
The metabolic pathways of organisms extensively use phosphorus in the generation of different biomolecules within the cell. Phosphorus-32 finds use for analysing metabolic pathways in pulse chase experiments, where a culture of cells is treated for a short time with a phosphorus-32-containing substrate. The sequence of chemical changes, which happen to the substrate, can then be traced by detecting which molecules contain the phosphorus-32 at multiple time points following the initial treatment.

DNA and RNA contain a large quantity of phosphorus in the phosphodiester linkages between bases in the oligonucleotide chain. DNA and RNA can therefore be tracked by replacing the phosphorus with phosphorus-32. This technique is extensively used in Southern blot and Northern blot analysis of DNA and RNA samples respectively. In both cases, a phosphorus-32-containing DNA probe hybridises to its complementary sequence, where it appears in a gel. Its location can then be detected by photographic film.

=== Plant sciences ===
Phosphorus-32 is used in plant sciences for tracking a plant's uptake of fertiliser from the roots to the leaves. The phosphorus-32-labelled fertiliser is given to the plant hydroponically, or via water in the soil, and the usage of the phosphorus can be mapped from the emitted beta radiation. The information gathered by mapping the fertiliser uptake shows how the plant takes up and uses the phosphorus from fertiliser.

== Safety ==
The high energy of emitted beta particles and the low half-life of phosphorus-32 make it potentially harmful; Its molar activity is 338.61 TBq/mmol (9151.6 Ci/mmol) and its specific activity is 10.590 EBq/kg (286.22 kCi/g). Typical safety precautions when working with phosphorus-32 include wearing a personal dosimeter to monitor exposure and an acrylic or perspex radiation shield to protect the body. Dense shielding, such as lead, is less effective due to the high-energy bremsstrahlung produced by the interaction of the beta particle and the shielding. Because the beta radiation from phosphorus-32 is blocked by around 1 m of air, it is also advisable to wear dosimeters on the parts of the body, for example the fingers, which come into close contact with the radioactive sample.
