= Monoisotopic element =

Element that has only a single stable isotope

Monoisotopic and mononuclidic elements Monoisotopic, but primordial radionuclides exist

A monoisotopic element is an element which has one and only one stable isotope (nuclide). There are 26 such elements, listed below.

Stability is experimentally defined for chemical elements, as all nuclides with atomic numbers over 40 or 66 (depending on definition, see stable nuclide) are theoretically unstable, but apparently have half-lives so long that their decay has not been observed either directly or indirectly (from measurement of products).

Monoisotopic elements are characterized, except in one case, by an odd number of protons (odd Z), and even number of neutrons. Because of the nuclear pairing energy gain, a nucleus with an odd number of both (except the four lightest cases: hydrogen-2, lithium-6, boron-10, nitrogen-14) will not be beta-stable or stable. The exception of now is tantalum-180m, observationally stable though not beta-stable.

That one exceptional case is beryllium, with even atomic number 4; its single stable, primordial isotope, beryllium-9, has 4 protons and 5 neutrons. This element is prevented from having a stable isotope with equal numbers of neutrons and protons (beryllium-8, with 4 of each) by the instability of that nucleus against splitting into two exceptionally well bound helium-4 nuclei, and is prevented from having a stable isotope with 4 protons and 6 neutrons by the very large mismatch in proton/neutron ratio for such a light element (4:6 ~ 0.67). (Nevertheless, beryllium-10 has a half-life of 1.387 million years, which, though too short to be primordial, indicates relative stability for a light isotope with such an imbalance.)

== Differentiation from mononuclidic elements ==
The set of monoisotopic elements overlaps with, but is not the same as, the set of 21 mononuclidic elements, which are characterized as having essentially only one isotope (nuclide) found in nature. The reason for this is the occurrence of certain long-lived radioactive primordial nuclides in nature, which may be of a monoisotopic element, and thus prevent them from being naturally mononuclidic. This happens in the cases of seven of the monoisotopic elements. These elements are monoisotopic, but due to the presence of a long-lived radioactive primordial nuclide, not mononuclidic. These cases are vanadium, rubidium, indium, lanthanum, europium, lutetium, and rhenium, and for indium and rhenium, the long-lived radionuclide is even the more abundant isotope in nature, and the stable isotope the less.

In two additional cases (bismuth and protactinium), elements that are mononuclidic by definition are not monoisotopic because the naturally occurring nuclide is radioactive, and thus the element has no stable isotopes at all. For an element to be monoisotopic, it must have one stable nuclide.

== List of stable isotopes of monoisotopic elements ==
Non-mononuclidic elements are marked with an asterisk, and the long-lived primordial radioisotope given. In two cases (indium and rhenium), the most abundant naturally occurring isotope is the mildly radioactive one, and in the case of europium, nearly half of it is.

1. Beryllium-9
2. Fluorine-19
3. Sodium-23
4. Aluminium-27
5. Phosphorus-31
6. Scandium-45
7. Vanadium-51* naturally occurs with 0.25% radioactive vanadium-50
8. Manganese-55
9. Cobalt-59
10. Arsenic-75
11. Rubidium-85* naturally occurs with 27.835% radioactive rubidium-87
12. Yttrium-89
13. Niobium-93
14. Rhodium-103
15. Indium-113* naturally occurs with majority (95.7%) radioactive isotope indium-115
16. Iodine-127
17. Caesium-133
18. Lanthanum-139* naturally occurs with 0.09% radioactive lanthanum-138
19. Praseodymium-141
20. Europium-153* naturally occurs with 47.8% radioactive europium-151
21. Terbium-159
22. Holmium-165
23. Thulium-169
24. Lutetium-175* naturally occurs with 2.59% radioactive lutetium-176
25. Rhenium-185* naturally occurs with majority (62.6%) radioactive isotope rhenium-187
26. Gold-197

== See also ==
- Primordial nuclide
- List of nuclides (sorted by half-life)
- Table of nuclides
- Isotope geochemistry
- Radionuclide
- Mononuclidic element
- Stable isotope
- List of elements by stability of isotopes
