= A-center =

Type of crystallographic defect in Silicon

An A-center is a type of crystallographic defect complex in silicon which consists of a vacancy defect and an impurity oxygen atom.

In general, oxygen in silicon is interstitial, in which the oxygen atom breaks the covalent bond between two adjacent silicon atoms and is attached in the middle. A-centers - another type of defect, in which oxygen takes the place of the absent silicon atom, that is, it becomes a kind of replacement defect.

The A-center is visible in infrared spectra with a wavelength of 12 μm.
