= Primordial nuclide =

Nuclides predating the Earth's formation (found on Earth)

Relative abundance of the chemical elements in the Earth's upper continental crust, on a per-atom basis

In geochemistry, geophysics and nuclear physics, primordial nuclides, or primordial isotopes, are nuclides found on Earth that have existed in their current form since before Earth was formed. Primordial nuclides were present in the interstellar medium from which the Solar System was formed, and were formed in the Big Bang, by nucleosynthesis in stars and supernovae followed by mass ejection, by cosmic ray spallation, or from other processes throughout the history of the universe. They are the stable nuclides plus the fraction of the long-lived radionuclides surviving from the primordial solar nebula through planet accretion until the present; 286 such nuclides are known.

== Stability ==
All of the known 251 stable nuclides, plus another 35 nuclides that have half-lives long enough to have survived from the formation of the Earth, occur as primordial nuclides. These 35 primordial radionuclides represent isotopes of 28 separate elements. Cadmium, tellurium, xenon, neodymium, samarium, osmium, and uranium each have two primordial radioisotopes (^{113}Cd, ^{116}Cd; ^{128}Te, ^{130}Te; ^{124}Xe, ^{136}Xe; ^{144}Nd, ^{150}Nd; ^{147}Sm, ^{148}Sm; ^{184}Os, ^{186}Os; and ^{235}U, ^{238}U).

Because the age of the Earth is 4.58×10^{9} years (4.58 billion years), the half-life of the given nuclides must be greater than about 10^{8} years (100 million years) for practical detectability. For example, for a nuclide with half-life 6×10^{7} years (60 million years), this means 77 half-lives have elapsed, meaning that for each mole (6.02×10^{23} atoms) of that nuclide being present at the formation of Earth, only 4 atoms remain today.

The seven shortest-lived primordial nuclides (i.e., the nuclides with the shortest half-lives) to be detected as primordial are ^{87}Rb (4.92×10^{10} years), ^{187}Re (4.12×10^{10} years), ^{176}Lu (3.70×10^{10} years), ^{232}Th (1.40×10^{10} years), ^{238}U (4.46×10^{9} years), ^{40}K (1.25×10^{9} years), and ^{235}U (7.04×10^{8} years).

These are the seven nuclides with half-lives comparable to, or somewhat less than, the estimated age of the universe. (^{87}Rb, ^{187}Re, ^{176}Lu, and ^{232}Th have half-lives somewhat longer than the age of the universe.) For practical purposes, nuclides with half-lives much longer than the age of the universe may be treated as if they were stable. ^{87}Rb, ^{187}Re, ^{176}Lu, ^{232}Th, and ^{238}U have half-lives long enough that their decay is limited over geological time scales; ^{40}K and ^{235}U have shorter half-lives and are hence severely depleted, but are still long-lived enough to remain present in significant amount on Earth.

The longest-lived isotope not proven to be primordial is ^{146}Sm, which has a half-life of 9.20×10^{7} years, followed by ^{244}Pu (8.13×10^{7} years) and ^{92}Nb (3.47×10^{7} years). ^{244}Pu was reported to exist in nature as a primordial nuclide in 1971, but this detection could not be confirmed by further studies in 2012 and 2022.

Taking into account that all these nuclides must exist for at least 4.58×10^{9} years, ^{146}Sm must survive 50 half-lives (and hence be reduced by 2^{50} ≈ 1×10^{15}), ^{244}Pu must survive 57 (and be reduced by a factor of 2^{57} ≈ 1×10^{17}), and ^{92}Nb must survive 130 (and be reduced by 2^{130} ≈ 1×10^{39}). Mathematically, considering the likely initial abundances of these nuclides, primordial ^{146}Sm and ^{244}Pu should persist somewhere within the Earth today, even if they are not identifiable in the relatively minor portion of the Earth's crust available to human assays, while ^{92}Nb and all shorter-lived nuclides should not. Nuclides such as ^{92}Nb that were present in the primordial solar nebula but have long since decayed away completely are termed extinct radionuclides if they have no other means of being regenerated. As for ^{244}Pu, calculations suggest that as of 2022, sensitivity limits were about one order of magnitude away from detecting it as a primordial nuclide.

Because primordial chemical elements often consist of more than one primordial isotope, there are only 83 distinct primordial chemical elements. Of these, 80 have at least one observationally stable isotope and three additional primordial elements have only radioactive isotopes (bismuth, thorium, and uranium).

== Naturally occurring nuclides that are not primordial ==
Some unstable isotopes which occur naturally (such as ^{14}C, ^{3}H, and ^{239}Pu) are not primordial, as they must be constantly regenerated. This occurs by cosmic radiation (in the case of cosmogenic nuclides such as ^{14}C and ^{3}H), or (rarely) by such processes as geonuclear transmutation (neutron capture by uranium in the case of ^{237}Np and ^{239}Pu). Other examples of common naturally occurring but non-primordial nuclides are isotopes of radon, polonium, and radium, which are all radiogenic daughters of uranium decay and are found in uranium ores. The stable argon isotope ^{40}Ar is actually more common as a radiogenic nuclide than as a primordial nuclide, forming almost 1% of the Earth's atmosphere, which is generated by the electron capture decay of the extremely long-lived radioactive primordial isotope ^{40}K, whose half-life is on the order of a billion years and thus has been generating argon since early in the Earth's existence. (Primordial argon was dominated by the alpha process nuclide ^{36}Ar, which is significantly rarer than ^{40}Ar on Earth.) And the classical decay chains of radiogenic elements derive from the long-lived radioactive primordial nuclides ^{232}Th, ^{235}U, and ^{238}U.

These nuclides are described as geogenic, meaning that they are decay or fission products of uranium or other actinides in subsurface rocks. All such nuclides have shorter half-lives than their parent radioactive primordial nuclides. Some other geogenic nuclides occur naturally as products of the spontaneous fission of one of these three long-lived nuclides, such as ^{126}Sn, which makes up about 10^{−12} percent of all natural tin. Another, ^{99}Tc, has also been detected, and there are five other long-lived fission products known.

== Primordial elements ==
A primordial element is a chemical element with at least one primordial nuclide. There are 251 stable primordial nuclides and 35 radioactive primordial nuclides, but only 80 primordial stable elements—hydrogen through lead, atomic numbers 1 to 82, except for technetium (43) and promethium (61)—and three radioactive primordial elements—bismuth (83), thorium (90), and uranium (92). If plutonium (94) turns out to be primordial (specifically, the long-lived isotope ^{244}Pu), then it would be a fourth radioactive primordial, though practically speaking it would still be more convenient to produce synthetically. Bismuth's half-life is so long that it is often classed with the 80 stable elements instead, since its radioactivity is not a cause for concern. The number of elements is smaller than the number of nuclides, because many of the primordial elements are represented by multiple isotopes. See chemical element for more information.

== Naturally occurring stable nuclides ==
As noted, this number is about 251. For a list, see the article list of elements by stability of isotopes. For a complete list noting which of the "stable" 251 nuclides may be in some respect unstable, see list of nuclides and stable nuclide. These questions do not impact the question of whether a nuclide is primordial, since all "nearly stable" nuclides, with half-lives longer than the age of the universe, are also primordial.

== Radioactive primordial nuclides ==
Although it is estimated that about 35 primordial nuclides are radioactive (see list of nuclides), it is very hard to determine the exact number of radioactive primordials, as there are many extremely long-lived nuclides whose half-lives are still unknown; in fact, all nuclides heavier than dysprosium-164 are theoretically radioactive. For example, it is predicted theoretically that all isotopes of tungsten, including those indicated by even the most modern empirical methods to be stable, must be radioactive to alpha decay, but this can be detected experimentally only for ^{180}W. Similarly, all four primordial isotopes of lead are expected to decay to mercury, but the predicted half-lives are so long (some exceeding 10^{100} years) that such decays could hardly be observed in the near future. Nevertheless, the number of nuclides with half-lives so long that they cannot be measured with present instruments—and are considered from this viewpoint to be stable nuclides—is limited. Even when a "stable" nuclide is found to be radioactive, it merely moves from the stable to the unstable list of primordials, and the total number of primordial nuclides remains unchanged. For practical purposes, such nuclides, whose radioactivity is not detectable by ordinary means, may be considered stable for all purposes outside specialized research.

These 35 primordial radionuclides are isotopes of 28 elements (cadmium, neodymium, osmium, samarium, tellurium, uranium, and xenon each have two primordial radioisotopes). These nuclides are listed in order of decreasing stability. Many of them are so nearly stable that they compete for abundance with stable isotopes of their respective elements; in fact, for three elements (indium, tellurium, and rhenium) a very long-lived radioactive primordial nuclide is more abundant than a stable nuclide.

The longest-lived radionuclide known, ^{128}Te, has a half-life of 7.5×10^{24} years: this is 5.5×10^{14} times the age of the Universe. Only four of these 35 nuclides have half-lives shorter than, or nearly equal to, the age of the universe. Most of the other 30 have half-lives much longer. The shortest-lived primordial, ^{235}U, has a half-life of 704 million years, about 15% of the age of the Earth and Solar System. Many of these nuclides decay by double beta decay, although some like ^{209}Bi decay by other means like alpha decay.

== See also ==
- Alpha nuclide
- List of nuclides
- Table of nuclides
- Isotope geochemistry
- Radionuclide
- Mononuclidic element
- Monoisotopic element
- Stable isotope
- List of elements by stability of isotopes
- Big Bang nucleosynthesis
