= Standard atomic weight =

Relative atomic mass as defined by IUPAC (CIAAW)

Example: copper in terrestrial sources. Two isotopes are present: copper-63 (62.9) and copper-65 (64.9), in abundances 69% + 31%. The standard atomic weight (A_{r}°(Cu)) for copper is the average, weighted by their natural abundance, and then divided by the atomic mass constant m_{u}.

The standard atomic weight of a chemical element (symbol A_{r}°(E) for element "E") is the weighted arithmetic mean of the relative isotopic masses of all isotopes of that element weighted by each isotope's abundance on Earth. For example, isotope ^{63}Cu (A_{r} = 62.929) constitutes 69% of the copper on Earth, the rest being ^{65}Cu (A_{r} = 64.927), so
$$A_\text{r}\text{°}(_\text{29}\text{Cu})=0.69\times62.929+0.31\times64.927=63.55.$$
Relative isotopic mass is dimensionless, and so is the weighted average. It can be converted into a measure of mass (with dimension M) by multiplying it with the atomic mass constant dalton.

Among various variants of the notion of atomic weight (A_{r}, also known as relative atomic mass) used by scientists, the standard atomic weight (A_{r}°) is the most common and practical. The standard atomic weight of each chemical element is determined and published by the Commission on Isotopic Abundances and Atomic Weights (CIAAW) of the International Union of Pure and Applied Chemistry (IUPAC) based on natural, stable, terrestrial sources of the element. The definition specifies the use of samples from many representative sources from the Earth, so that the value can widely be used as the atomic weight for substances as they are encountered in reality—for example, in pharmaceuticals and scientific research. Non-standardized atomic weights of an element are specific to sources and samples, such as the atomic weight of carbon in a particular bone from a particular archaeological site. Standard atomic weight averages such values to the range of atomic weights that a chemist might expect to derive from many random samples from Earth. This range is the rationale for the interval notation given for some standard atomic weight values.

Of the 118 known chemical elements, 84 have this Earth-environment based value, all but 4 of which have stable isotopes. Typically, such a value is, for example helium: A_{r}°(He) = 4.002602(2). The "(2)" indicates the uncertainty in the last digit shown, to read 4.002602±0.000002. IUPAC also publishes abridged values, rounded to five significant figures. For helium, A_{r, abridged}°(He) = 4.0026.

For fourteen elements the samples diverge on this value, because their sample sources have had a different decay history. For example, thallium (Tl) in sedimentary rocks has a different isotopic composition than in igneous rocks and volcanic gases. For these elements, the standard atomic weight is noted as an interval: A_{r}°(Tl) = [204.38, 204.39]. With such an interval, for less demanding situations, IUPAC also publishes a conventional value. For thallium, A_{r, conventional}°(Tl) = 204.38.

== Definition ==
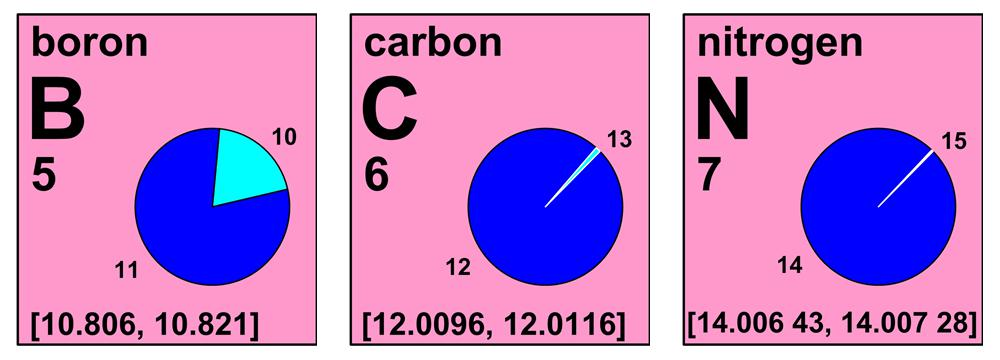
Excerpt of an IUPAC periodic table showing the interval notation of the standard atomic weights of boron, carbon, and nitrogen (Chemistry International, IUPAC). Example: the pie chart for boron shows it to be composed of about 20% ^{10}B and 80% ^{11}B. This isotope mix causes the atomic weight of ordinary Earthly boron samples to be expected to fall within the interval 10.806 to 10.821. and this interval is the standard atomic weight. Boron samples from unusual sources, particularly non-terrestrial sources, might have measured atomic weights that fall outside this range. Atomic weight and relative atomic mass are synonyms.

The standard atomic weight is a special value of the relative atomic mass. It is defined as the "recommended values" of relative atomic masses of sources in the local environment of the Earth's crust and atmosphere as determined by the IUPAC Commission on Atomic Weights and Isotopic Abundances (CIAAW). In general, values from different sources are subject to natural variation due to a different radioactive history of sources. Thus, standard atomic weights are an expectation range of atomic weights from a range of samples or sources. By limiting the sources to terrestrial origin only, the CIAAW-determined values have less variance, and are a more precise value for relative atomic masses (atomic weights) actually found and used in worldly materials.

The CIAAW-published values are used and sometimes lawfully required in mass calculations. The values have an uncertainty (noted in brackets), or are an expectation interval (see example in illustration immediately above). This uncertainty reflects natural variability in isotopic distribution for an element, rather than uncertainty in measurement (which is much smaller with quality instruments).

Although there is an attempt to cover the range of variability on Earth with standard atomic weight figures, there are known cases of mineral samples which contain elements with atomic weights that are outliers from the standard atomic weight range.

For synthetic elements the isotope formed depends on the means of synthesis, so the concept of natural isotope abundance has no meaning. Therefore, for synthetic elements the total nucleon count of the most stable isotope (i.e., the isotope with the longest half-life) is listed in brackets, in place of the standard atomic weight.

When the term "atomic weight" is used in chemistry, usually it is the more specific standard atomic weight that is implied. It is standard atomic weights that are used in periodic tables and many standard references in ordinary terrestrial chemistry.

Lithium represents a unique case where the natural abundances of the isotopes have in some cases been found to have been perturbed by human isotopic separation activities to the point of affecting the uncertainty in its standard atomic weight, even in samples obtained from natural sources, such as rivers.

=== Terrestrial definition ===
An example of why "conventional terrestrial sources" must be specified in giving standard atomic weight values is the element argon. Between locations in the Solar System, the atomic weight of argon varies as much as 10%, due to extreme variance in isotopic composition. Where the major source of argon is the decay of ^{40}K in rocks, ^{40}Ar will be the dominant isotope. Such locations include the planets Mercury and Mars, and the moon Titan. On Earth, the ratios of the three isotopes ^{36}Ar : ^{38}Ar : ^{40}Ar are approximately 5 : 1 : 1600, giving terrestrial argon a standard atomic weight of 39.948(1).

However, such is not the case in the rest of the universe. Argon produced directly, by stellar nucleosynthesis, is dominated by the alpha-process nuclide ^{36}Ar. Correspondingly, solar argon contains 84.6% ^{36}Ar (according to solar wind measurements), and the ratio of the three isotopes ^{36}Ar : ^{38}Ar : ^{40}Ar in the atmospheres of the outer planets is 8400 : 1600 : 1. The atomic weight of argon in the Sun and most of the universe, therefore, would be only approximately 36.3.

=== Causes of uncertainty on Earth ===
Famously, the published atomic weight value comes with an uncertainty. This uncertainty (and related: precision) follows from its definition, the source being "terrestrial and stable". Systematic causes for uncertainty are:

1. Measurement limits. As always, the physical measurement is never finite. There is always more detail to be found and read. This applies to every single, pure isotope found. For example, today the mass of the main natural fluorine isotope (fluorine-19) can be measured to the accuracy of eleven decimal places: 18.998403163(6). But a still more precise measurement system could become available, producing more decimals.
2. Imperfect mixtures of isotopes. In the samples taken and measured the mix (relative abundance) of those isotopes may vary. For example, copper. While in general its two isotopes make out 69.15% and 30.85% each of all copper found, the natural sample being measured can have had an incomplete 'stirring' and so the percentages are different. The precision is improved by measuring more samples of course, but there remains this cause of uncertainty. (Example: lead samples vary so much, it can not be noted more precise than four figures: 207.2)
3. Earthly sources with a different history. A source is the greater area being researched, for example 'ocean water' or 'volcanic rock' (as opposed to a 'sample': the single heap of material being investigated). It appears that some elements have a different isotopic mix per source. For example, thallium in igneous rock has more lighter isotopes, while in sedimentary rock it has more heavy isotopes. There is no Earthly mean number. These elements show the interval notation: A_{r}°(Tl) = [204.38, 204.39]. For practical reasons, a simplified 'conventional' number is published too (for Tl: 204.38).

These three uncertainties are accumulative. The published value is a result of all these.

== Determination of relative atomic mass ==
Modern relative atomic masses (a term specific to a given element sample) are calculated from measured values of atomic mass (for each nuclide) and isotopic composition of a sample. Highly accurate atomic masses are available for virtually all non-radioactive nuclides, but isotopic compositions are both harder to measure to high precision and more subject to variation between samples. For this reason, the relative atomic masses of the 22 mononuclidic elements (which are the same as the isotopic masses for each of the single naturally occurring nuclides of these elements) are known to especially high accuracy.

Isotope	Atomic mass	Abundance	
Isotope	Atomic mass	Standard	Range
^{28}Si	27.976 926 532 46(194)	92.2297(7)%	92.21–92.25%
^{29}Si	28.976 494 700(22)	4.6832(5)%	4.67–4.69%
^{30}Si	29.973 770 171(32)	3.0872(5)%	3.08–3.10%

The calculation is exemplified for silicon, whose relative atomic mass is especially important in metrology. Silicon exists in nature as a mixture of three isotopes: ^{28}Si, ^{29}Si and ^{30}Si. The atomic masses of these nuclides are known to a precision of one part in 14 billion for ^{28}Si and about one part in one billion for the others. However the range of natural abundance for the isotopes is such that the standard abundance can only be given to about ±0.001% (see table). The calculation is

A_{r}(Si) = (27.97693 × 0.922297) + (28.97649 × 0.046832) + (29.97377 × 0.030872) = 28.0854

The estimation of the uncertainty is complicated, especially as the sample distribution is not necessarily symmetrical: the IUPAC standard relative atomic masses are quoted with estimated symmetrical uncertainties, and the value for silicon is 28.0855(3). The relative standard uncertainty in this value is 1×10^{–5} or 10 ppm. To further reflect this natural variability, in 2010, IUPAC made the decision to list the relative atomic masses of 10 elements as an interval rather than a fixed number.

== Naming controversy ==
The use of the name "atomic weight" has attracted a great deal of controversy among scientists. Objectors to the name usually prefer the term "relative atomic mass" (not to be confused with atomic mass). The basic objection is that atomic weight is not a weight, that is the force exerted on an object in a gravitational field, measured in units of force such as the newton or poundal.

In reply, supporters of the term "atomic weight" point out (among other arguments) that:

- the name has been in continuous use for the same quantity since it was first conceptualized in 1808;
- for most of that time, atomic weights really were measured by weighing (that is by gravimetric analysis) and the name of a physical quantity should not change simply because the method of its determination has changed;
- the term "relative atomic mass" should be reserved for the mass of a specific nuclide (or isotope), while "atomic weight" be used for the weighted mean of the atomic masses over all the atoms in the sample;
- it is not uncommon to have misleading names of physical quantities which are retained for historical reasons, such as
  - electromotive force, which is not a force
  - resolving power, which is not a power quantity
  - molar concentration, which is not a molar quantity (a quantity expressed per unit amount of substance).

It could be added that atomic weight is often not truly "atomic" either, as it does not correspond to the property of any individual atom. The same argument could be made against "relative atomic mass" used in this sense.

== Published values ==
IUPAC, through its Commission on Isotopic Abundances and Atomic Weights (CIAAW), publishes a formal value, called the standard atomic weight for each element that has at least one stable isotope or a well-characterised terrestrial isotopic composition. Updates are made only when justified by new high-precision measurements; they are no longer issued on a fixed biennial schedule. The most recent revisions (January 2025) affected three elements: gadolinium, lutetium, and zirconium.

The published value may be given with an uncertainty, e.g. neon: 20.1797(6), or as an interval, e.g. boron: [10.806, 10.821].

Currently 83 elements have an assigned standard atomic weight. In addition to the full-precision values, CIAAW publishes abridged standard atomic weights (to five significant digits) and, for the twelve elements whose atomic weights are expressed as intervals, single-number conventional atomic-weight values for use when isotopic variation is unimportant.

The symbol A_{r}(E) denotes the relative atomic mass of a particular sample of element E, whereas the standard atomic weight is denoted A_{r}°(E) (the circle ° indicating the defined standard-state composition).

=== Abridged atomic weight ===
The abridged atomic weight, also published by CIAAW, is derived from the standard atomic weight, reducing the numbers to five digits (five significant figures). The name does not say 'rounded'.

Interval borders are rounded downward for the first (low most) border, and upward for the upward (upmost) border. This way, the more precise original interval is fully covered.

Examples:

- Calcium: A_{r}°(Ca) = 40.078(4) → A_{r, abridged}°(Ca) = 40.078
- Helium: A_{r}°(He) = 4.002602(2) → A_{r, abridged}°(He) = 4.0026
- Hydrogen: A_{r}°(H) = [1.00784, 1.00811] → A_{r, abridged}°(H) = [1.0078, 1.0082]

=== Conventional atomic weight ===
Fourteen chemical elements – hydrogen, lithium, boron, carbon, nitrogen, oxygen, magnesium, silicon, sulfur, chlorine, argon, bromine, thallium, and lead – have a standard atomic weight that is defined not as a single number, but as an interval. For example, hydrogen has A_{r}°(H) = [1.00 784, 1.00811]. This notation states that the various sources on Earth have substantially different isotopic constitutions, and that the uncertainties in all of them are just covered by the two numbers. For these elements, there is not an 'Earth average' constitution, and the 'right' value is not its middle (which would be 1.007975 for hydrogen, with an uncertainty of (±0.000135) that would make it just cover the interval). However, for situations where a less precise value is acceptable, for example in trade, CIAAW has published a single-number conventional atomic weight. For hydrogen, A_{r, conventional}°(H) = 1.008.

=== A formal short atomic weight ===
By using the abridged value, and the conventional value for the fourteen interval values, a short IUPAC-defined value (5 digits plus uncertainty) can be given for all stable elements. In many situations, and in periodic tables, this may be sufficiently detailed.

Overview: formal value types of the standard atomic weight
Element (E)		A_{r}°(E)	Value type	A_{r}°(E), abridged or conventional	Mass number [most stable isotope]
hydrogen	_{1}H	[1.00784, 1.00811]	interval	1.0080±0.0002	
nitrogen	_{7}N	[14.00643, 14.00728]	interval	14.007±0.001	
fluorine	_{9}F	18.998403162±0.000000005	number ± uncertainty	18.998±0.001	
calcium	_{20}Ca	40.078±0.004	number ± uncertainty	40.078±0.004	
technetium	_{43}Tc	(none)	most stable isotope		[97]

== List of atomic weights ==
Standard atomic weight of the elements (IUPAC 2009–2024 (Note: (This list: ) CIAAW may publish changes to atomic weights (including its precision and derived values). Since 1947, any update this is done in odd years nominally; the actual date of publication may be some time later.: 2009 (introducing interval notation; Ge): "Atomic weights of the elements 2009 (IUPAC Technical Report)". Pure and Applied Chemistry. 83 (2): 359–396. 12 December 2010. doi:10.1351/PAC-REP-10-09-14.: 2011 (interval for Br, Mg): "Atomic weights of the elements 2011 (IUPAC Technical Report)". Pure and Applied Chemistry. 85 (5): 1047–1078. 29 April 2013. doi:10.1351/PAC-REP-13-03-02.: 2013 (all elements listed): Meija, Juris; et al. (2016). "Atomic weights of the elements 2013 (IUPAC Technical Report)". Pure and Applied Chemistry. 88 (3): 265–291. doi:10.1515/pac-2015-0305.: 2015 (ytterbium changed): "Standard Atomic Weight of Ytterbium Revised". Chemistry International. 37 (5–6): 26. October 2015. doi:10.1515/ci-2015-0512. eISSN 0193-6484. ISSN 0193-6484.: 2017 (14 values changed): "Standard atomic weights of 14 chemical elements revised". CIAAW. 2018-06-05.: 2019 (hafnium value changed): Meija, Juris; et al. (2019-12-09). "Standard atomic weight of hafnium revised". CIAAW.; 2020* (lead value changed): Zhu, Xiang-Kun; Benefield, Jacqueline; Coplen, Tyler B.; Gao, Zhaofu; Holden, Norman E. (1 October 2020). "Variation of lead isotopic composition and atomic weight in terrestrial materials (IUPAC Technical Report)". doi:10.1515/pac-2018-0916.; * "2020" is an inconsistent year for change publication: CIAAW maintains that only odd years, changes are publicised.: 2021 (all elements listed); (4 values changed; introduced new symbol; merge "conventional" into "abridged" columns; change uncertainty notation (use "±"); Prohaska, Thomas; Irrgeher, Johanna; Benefield, Jacqueline; Böhlke, John K.; Chesson, Lesley A.; Coplen, Tyler B.; Ding, Tiping; Dunn, Philip J. H.; Gröning, Manfred; Holden, Norman E.; Meijer, Harro A. J. (2022-05-04). "Standard atomic weights of the elements 2021 (IUPAC Technical Report)". Pure and Applied Chemistry. doi:10.1515/pac-2019-0603. ISSN 1365-3075. Uncertainty handling About notation and handling of the uncertainty in the values, including those in [ ] range values: Possolo, Antonio; van der Veen, Adriaan M.H.; Meija, Juris; et al. (4 Jan 2018). "Interpreting and propagating the uncertainty of the standard atomic weights (IUPAC Technical Report)". doi:10.1515/pac-2016-0402.; {{CIAAW2021}}: changing notation (i.e., interpretation, not the value) from 123.45(2) into 123.45±0.02; Outdated references: {{NUBASE 1997}} — Audi; {{NUBASE 2003}} — Audi (used in the 2008 enwiki "Isotopes of <element>" Big Tables); {{NUBASE 2012}}; {{CIAAW2003}} — De Laeter; {{CIAAW 2005}} — Wieser; {{CRC85}} ({{CRC85|chapter=11}}) &mdsh; Holden; "Universal Nuclide Chart". nucleonica. -- broken/bad access; See also: {{Isotopes table/references}}))
Z	Symbol	Name	A_{r, standard}	Abridged	Year changed
1	H	hydrogen	[1.00784, 1.00811]	1.0080±0.0002	2009
2	He	helium	4.002602±0.000002	4.0026±0.0001	1983
3	Li	lithium	[6.938, 6.997]	6.94±0.06	2009
4	Be	beryllium	9.0121831±0.0000005	9.0122±0.0001	2013
5	B	boron	[10.806, 10.821]	10.81±0.02	2009
6	C	carbon	[12.0096, 12.0116]	12.011±0.002	2009
7	N	nitrogen	[14.00643, 14.00728]	14.007±0.001	2009
8	O	oxygen	[15.99903, 15.99977]	15.999±0.001	2009
9	F	fluorine	18.998403162±0.000000005	18.998±0.001	2021
10	Ne	neon	20.1797±0.0006	20.180±0.001	1985
11	Na	sodium	22.98976928±0.00000002	22.990±0.001	2005
12	Mg	magnesium	[24.304, 24.307]	24.305±0.002	2011
13	Al	aluminium	26.9815384±0.0000003	26.982±0.001	2017
14	Si	silicon	[28.084, 28.086]	28.085±0.001	2009
15	P	phosphorus	30.973761998±0.000000005	30.974±0.001	2013
16	S	sulfur	[32.059, 32.076]	32.06±0.02	2009
17	Cl	chlorine	[35.446, 35.457]	35.45±0.01	2009
18	Ar	argon	[39.792, 39.963]	39.95±0.16	2017
19	K	potassium	39.0983±0.0001	39.098±0.001	1979
20	Ca	calcium	40.078±0.004	40.078±0.004	1983
21	Sc	scandium	44.955907±0.000004	44.956±0.001	2021
22	Ti	titanium	47.867±0.001	47.867±0.001	1993
23	V	vanadium	50.9415±0.0001	50.942±0.001	1977
24	Cr	chromium	51.9961±0.0006	51.996±0.001	1983
25	Mn	manganese	54.938043±0.000002	54.938±0.001	2017
26	Fe	iron	55.845±0.002	55.845±0.002	1993
27	Co	cobalt	58.933194±0.000003	58.933±0.001	2017
28	Ni	nickel	58.6934±0.0004	58.693±0.001	2007
29	Cu	copper	63.546±0.003	63.546±0.003	1969
30	Zn	zinc	65.38±0.02	65.38±0.02	2007
31	Ga	gallium	69.723±0.001	69.723±0.001	1987
32	Ge	germanium	72.630±0.008	72.630±0.008	2009
33	As	arsenic	74.921595±0.000006	74.922±0.001	2013
34	Se	selenium	78.971±0.008	78.971±0.008	2013
35	Br	bromine	[79.901, 79.907]	79.904±0.003	2011
36	Kr	krypton	83.798±0.002	83.798±0.002	2001
37	Rb	rubidium	85.4678±0.0003	85.468±0.001	1969
38	Sr	strontium	87.62±0.01	87.62±0.01	1969
39	Y	yttrium	88.905838±0.000002	88.906±0.001	2021
40	Zr	zirconium	91.222±0.003	91.222±0.003	2024
41	Nb	niobium	92.90637±0.00001	92.906±0.001	2017
42	Mo	molybdenum	95.95±0.01	95.95±0.01	2013
43	Tc	technetium	-		
44	Ru	ruthenium	101.07±0.02	101.07±0.02	1983
45	Rh	rhodium	102.90549±0.00002	102.91±0.01	2017
46	Pd	palladium	106.42±0.01	106.42±0.01	1979
47	Ag	silver	107.8682±0.0002	107.87±0.01	1985
48	Cd	cadmium	112.414±0.004	112.41±0.01	2013
49	In	indium	114.818±0.001	114.82±0.01	2011
50	Sn	tin	118.710±0.007	118.71±0.01	1983
51	Sb	antimony	121.760±0.001	121.76±0.01	1993
52	Te	tellurium	127.60±0.03	127.60±0.03	1969
53	I	iodine	126.90447±0.00003	126.90±0.01	1985
54	Xe	xenon	131.293±0.006	131.29±0.01	1999
55	Cs	caesium	132.90545196±0.00000006	132.91±0.01	2013
56	Ba	barium	137.327±0.007	137.33±0.01	1985
57	La	lanthanum	138.90547±0.00007	138.91±0.01	2005
58	Ce	cerium	140.116±0.001	140.12±0.01	1995
59	Pr	praseodymium	140.90766±0.00001	140.91±0.01	2017
60	Nd	neodymium	144.242±0.003	144.24±0.01	2005
61	Pm	promethium	-		
62	Sm	samarium	150.36±0.02	150.36±0.02	2005
63	Eu	europium	151.964±0.001	151.96±0.01	1995
64	Gd	gadolinium	157.249±0.002	157.25±0.01	2024
65	Tb	terbium	158.925354±0.000007	158.93±0.01	2021
66	Dy	dysprosium	162.500±0.001	162.50±0.01	2001
67	Ho	holmium	164.930329±0.000005	164.93±0.01	2021
68	Er	erbium	167.259±0.003	167.26±0.01	1999
69	Tm	thulium	168.934219±0.000005	168.93±0.01	2021
70	Yb	ytterbium	173.045±0.010	173.05±0.02	2015
71	Lu	lutetium	174.96669±0.00005	174.97±0.01	2024
72	Hf	hafnium	178.486±0.006	178.49±0.01	2019
73	Ta	tantalum	180.94788±0.00002	180.95±0.01	2005
74	W	tungsten	183.84±0.01	183.84±0.01	1991
75	Re	rhenium	186.207±0.001	186.21±0.01	1973
76	Os	osmium	190.23±0.03	190.23±0.03	1991
77	Ir	iridium	192.217±0.002	192.22±0.01	2017
78	Pt	platinum	195.084±0.009	195.08±0.02	2005
79	Au	gold	196.966570±0.000004	196.97±0.01	2017
80	Hg	mercury	200.592±0.003	200.59±0.01	2011
81	Tl	thallium	[204.382, 204.385]	204.38±0.01	2009
82	Pb	lead	[206.14, 207.94]	207.2±1.1	2020
83	Bi	bismuth	208.98040±0.00001	208.98±0.01	2005
84	Po	polonium	-		
85	At	astatine	-		
86	Rn	radon	-		
87	Fr	francium	-		
88	Ra	radium	-		
89	Ac	actinium	-		
90	Th	thorium	232.0377±0.0004	232.04±0.01	2013
91	Pa	protactinium	231.03588±0.00001	231.04±0.01	2017
92	U	uranium	238.02891±0.00003	238.03±0.01	1999
93	Np	neptunium	-		
94	Pu	plutonium	-		
95	Am	americium	-		
96	Cm	curium	-		
97	Bk	berkelium	-		
98	Cf	californium	-		
99	Es	einsteinium	-		
100	Fm	fermium	-		
101	Md	mendelevium	-		
102	No	nobelium	-		
103	Lr	lawrencium	-		
104	Rf	rutherfordium	-		
105	Db	dubnium	-		
106	Sg	seaborgium	-		
107	Bh	bohrium	-		
108	Hs	hassium	-		
109	Mt	meitnerium	-		
110	Ds	darmstadtium	-		
111	Rg	roentgenium	-		
112	Cn	copernicium	-		
113	Nh	nihonium	-		
114	Fl	flerovium	-		
115	Mc	moscovium	-		
116	Lv	livermorium	-		
117	Ts	tennessine	-		
118	Og	oganesson	-		

=== In the periodic table ===
Periodic table

Group	1	2		3	4	5	6	7	8	9	10	11	12	13	14	15	16	17	18
	Hydrogen & alkali metals	Alkaline earth metals												Triels	Tetrels	Pnictogens	Chalcogens	Halogens	Noble gases
Period 1	Hydrogen1H1.0080																		Helium2He4.0026
2	Lithium3Li6.94	Beryllium4Be9.0122												Boron5B10.81	Carbon6C12.011	Nitrogen7N14.007	Oxygen8O15.999	Fluorine9F18.998	Neon10Ne20.180
3	Sodium11Na22.990	Magnesium12Mg24.305												Aluminium13Al26.982	Silicon14Si28.085	Phosphorus15P30.974	Sulfur16S32.06	Chlorine17Cl35.45	Argon18Ar39.95
4	Potassium19K39.098	Calcium20Ca40.078		Scandium21Sc44.956	Titanium22Ti47.867	Vanadium23V50.942	Chromium24Cr51.996	Manganese25Mn54.938	Iron26Fe55.845	Cobalt27Co58.933	Nickel28Ni58.693	Copper29Cu63.546	Zinc30Zn65.38	Gallium31Ga69.723	Germanium32Ge72.630	Arsenic33As74.922	Selenium34Se78.971	Bromine35Br79.904	Krypton36Kr83.798
5	Rubidium37Rb85.468	Strontium38Sr87.62		Yttrium39Y88.906	Zirconium40Zr91.224	Niobium41Nb92.906	Molybdenum42Mo95.95	Technetium43Tc[97]	Ruthenium44Ru101.07	Rhodium45Rh102.91	Palladium46Pd106.42	Silver47Ag107.87	Cadmium48Cd112.41	Indium49In114.82	Tin50Sn118.71	Antimony51Sb121.76	Tellurium52Te127.60	Iodine53I126.90	Xenon54Xe131.29
6	Caesium55Cs132.91	Barium56Ba137.33	1 asterisk	Lutetium71Lu174.97	Hafnium72Hf178.49	Tantalum73Ta180.95	Tungsten74W183.84	Rhenium75Re186.21	Osmium76Os190.23	Iridium77Ir192.22	Platinum78Pt195.08	Gold79Au196.97	Mercury80Hg200.59	Thallium81Tl204.38	Lead82Pb207.2	Bismuth83Bi208.98	Polonium84Po[209]	Astatine85At[210]	Radon86Rn[222]
7	Francium87Fr[223]	Radium88Ra[226]	1 asterisk	Lawrencium103Lr[266]	Rutherfordium104Rf[267]	Dubnium105Db[268]	Seaborgium106Sg[269]	Bohrium107Bh[270]	Hassium108Hs[271]	Meitnerium109Mt[278]	Darmstadtium110Ds[281]	Roentgenium111Rg[282]	Copernicium112Cn[285]	Nihonium113Nh[286]	Flerovium114Fl[289]	Moscovium115Mc[290]	Livermorium116Lv[293]	Tennessine117Ts[294]	Oganesson118Og[294]
			1 asterisk	Lanthanum57La138.91	Cerium58Ce140.12	Praseodymium59Pr140.91	Neodymium60Nd144.24	Promethium61Pm[145]	Samarium62Sm150.36	Europium63Eu151.96	Gadolinium64Gd157.25	Terbium65Tb158.93	Dysprosium66Dy162.50	Holmium67Ho164.93	Erbium68Er167.26	Thulium69Tm168.93	Ytterbium70Yb173.05
			1 asterisk	Actinium89Ac[227]	Thorium90Th232.04	Protactinium91Pa231.04	Uranium92U238.03	Neptunium93Np[237]	Plutonium94Pu[244]	Americium95Am[243]	Curium96Cm[247]	Berkelium97Bk[247]	Californium98Cf[251]	Einsteinium99Es[252]	Fermium100Fm[257]	Mendelevium101Md[258]	Nobelium102No[259]

Primordial From decay Synthetic Border shows natural occurrence of the element

Standard atomic weight A_{r, std}(E)
- Ca: 40.078 — Abridged value (uncertainty omitted here)
- Po: [209] — mass number of the most stable isotope

s-block	f-block	d-block	p-block

== See also ==
- International Union of Pure and Applied Chemistry (IUPAC)
- Commission on Isotopic Abundances and Atomic Weights (CIAAW)
