= Stable isotope =

Nuclide that does not undergo radioactive decay

Graph of nuclides (isotopes) by type of decay. The black squares between the orange and blue regions represent stable nuclides. The continuous line passing below most of the nuclides represents equal proton and neutron number. Elements with more than 20 protons either have more neutrons than protons or are unstable.

In physics, a stable isotope is a nuclide that has no detected decay on geological timescales. When discussing different elements, a stable isotope may be called a stable nuclide. The relative abundance of such stable isotopes can be measured experimentally (isotope analysis), yielding an isotope ratio that can be used as a research tool. The nuclei of stable isotopes are not radioactive and do not undergo radioactive decay.

The 80 elements with one or more stable isotopes comprise a total over 250 nuclides that have not been shown to decay using current equipment. Of these 80 elements, 26 have only one stable isotope and are called monoisotopic. The other 56 have more than one stable isotope. Tin has ten stable isotopes, the largest number of any element.

== Definition of stability ==
Stable isotopes are those isotopes not known to be radioactive. As of 2013, there are 252 stable isotopes. An additional 37 isotopes decay with half-lifes sufficiently long that they contribute to the atomic mass of elements in normal materials. Examples include ^{40}K and ^{235}U.

Some isotopes that are classed as stable (i.e., no radioactivity has been observed for them) are predicted to have extremely long half-lives (sometimes 10^{18} years or more). If the predicted half-life falls into an experimentally accessible range, such isotopes have a chance to move from the list of stable nuclides to the radioactive category, once their activity is observed. For example, ^{209}Bi and ^{180}W were formerly classed as stable, but were found to be alpha-active in 2003; there is some evidence of alpha decay for ^{184}Os based on geochemical analysis of meteorites. However, such nuclides do not change their status as primordial when they are found to be radioactive.

Most stable isotopes on Earth are believed to have been formed in processes of nucleosynthesis, either in the Big Bang, or in generations of stars that preceded the formation of the Solar System. However, some stable isotopes also show abundance variations in the earth as a result of decay from long-lived radioactive nuclides. These decay-products are termed radiogenic isotopes, in order to distinguish them from the much larger group of 'non-radiogenic' isotopes.

=== Unstable isotopes ===
Some naturally occurring radionuclides are unstable. They are classified into three groups: primordial, secondary, or cosmogenic. If the half-life of a nuclide is comparable to, or greater than, the Earth's age (4.5 billion years), a significant amount will have survived since the formation of the Solar System, it is called a primordial nuclide. Many naturally occurring radioisotopes (another 53 or so, for a total of about 339) exhibit still shorter half-lives than 700 million years, but they are made freshly, as daughter products of decay processes of primordial nuclides (for example, radium isotopes from uranium decay). Cosmogenic nuclides are produced when cosmic rays bombard the Earth (for example, ^{14}C made from nitrogen).

== Stable isotope ratio ==
Small differences in the relative abundance of two isotopes of one element have wide scientific and technological applications. The relative abundance is expressed as a ratio and compared to reference standards. These stable isotope ratios can be used to determine the West African Monsoon over the last 155,000 years, the feeding patterns of moulting seabirds, determine the style and country of origin of beer, mapping out ecological relationships and nutrient dynamics in aquatic ecosystems, and a wide variety of applications in isotope geochemistry.

== Isotopes per element ==
Of the known chemical elements, 80 elements have at least one stable nuclide. These comprise the first 82 elements from hydrogen to lead, with the two exceptions, technetium (element 43) and promethium (element 61), that do not have any stable nuclides.

Stable isotopes:

- 1 element (tin) has 10 stable isotopes
- 5 elements have 7 stable isotopes apiece
- 7 elements have 6 stable isotopes apiece
- 11 elements have 5 stable isotopes apiece
- 9 elements have 4 stable isotopes apiece
- 5 elements have 3 stable isotopes apiece
- 16 elements have 2 stable isotopes apiece
- 26 elements have 1 single stable isotope.

These last 26 are thus called monoisotopic elements. The mean number of stable isotopes for elements which have at least one stable isotope is 251/80 = 3.1375.

=== Physical magic numbers and odd and even proton and neutron count ===
Stability of isotopes is affected by the ratio of protons to neutrons, and also by presence of certain magic numbers of neutrons or protons which represent closed and filled quantum shells. These quantum shells correspond to a set of energy levels within the shell model of the nucleus; filled shells, such as the filled shell of 50 protons for tin, confers unusual stability on the nuclide. As in the case of tin, a magic number for Z, the atomic number, tends to increase the number of stable isotopes for the element.

Conversely, of the 251 known stable nuclides, only five have both an odd number of protons and odd number of neutrons: hydrogen-2 (deuterium), lithium-6, boron-10, nitrogen-14, and tantalum-180m. Also, only four naturally occurring, radioactive odd–odd nuclides have a half-life >10^{9} years: potassium-40, vanadium-50, lanthanum-138, and lutetium-176. Odd–odd primordial nuclides are rare because most odd–odd nuclei beta-decay, because the decay products are even–even, and are therefore more strongly bound, due to nuclear pairing effects.

Yet another effect of the instability of an odd number of either type of nucleon is that odd-numbered elements tend to have fewer stable isotopes. Of the 26 monoisotopic elements (those with only one stable isotope), all but one have an odd atomic number, and all but one has an even number of neutrons: the single exception to both rules is beryllium.

The end of the stable elements occurs after lead, largely because nuclei with 128 neutrons—two neutrons above the magic number 126—are extraordinarily unstable and almost immediately alpha-decay. This contributes to the very short half-lives of astatine, radon, and francium. A similar phenomenon occurs to a much lesser extent with 84 neutrons—two neutrons above the magic number 82—where various isotopes of lanthanide elements alpha-decay.

=== Nuclear isomers, including a "stable" one ===
The 251 known stable nuclides include tantalum-180m, since even though its decay is automatically implied by it being "metastable", this has not been observed. All "stable" isotopes (stable by observation, not theory) are the ground states of nuclei, except for tantalum-180m, which is a nuclear isomer or excited state. The ground state, tantalum-180, is radioactive with half-life 8 hours; in contrast, the decay of the nuclear isomer is extremely strongly forbidden by spin-parity selection rules. It has been reported by direct observation that the half-life of ^{180m}Ta to gamma decay must be >10^{15} years. Other possible modes of ^{180m}Ta decay (beta decay, electron capture, and alpha decay) have also never been observed.

Binding energy per nucleon of common isotopes.

== Rare decay ==
Isotopes that are theoretically believed to be unstable but have not been observed to decay are termed observationally stable. Currently, there are 105 "stable" isotopes which are theoretically unstable, 40 of which have been observed in detail with no sign of decay, the lightest in any case being ^{36}Ar. Many "stable" nuclides are metastable but have not been observed to decay, and are expected to undergo very rare kinds of radioactive decay, including double beta decay.

146 nuclides from 62 elements with atomic numbers from 1 (hydrogen) to 66 (dysprosium) except 43 (technetium), 61 (promethium), 62 (samarium), and 63 (europium) are theoretically stable to any kind of nuclear decay — except for the theoretical possibility of proton decay, which has never been observed despite extensive searches for it; and spontaneous fission, which is theoretically possible for the nuclides with atomic mass numbers ≥ 93, that is all those with atomic numbers ≥ 41.

Besides spontaneous fission, other theoretical decay routes for heavier elements include:

- alpha decay – 70 heavy nuclides (the lightest two are cerium-142 and neodymium-143)
- double beta decay – 55 nuclides
- beta decay – tantalum-180m
- electron capture – tellurium-123, tantalum-180m
- double electron capture
- isomeric transition – tantalum-180m

These include all nuclides of mass 165 and greater. Argon-36 is the lightest known "stable" nuclide which is theoretically unstable.

The positivity of energy release in these processes means they are allowed kinematically (they do not violate conservation of energy) and, thus, in principle, can occur. They are not observed due to strong but not absolute suppression, by spin-parity selection rules (for beta decays and isomeric transitions) or by the thickness of the potential barrier (for alpha and cluster decays and spontaneous fission).

It is expected that improvement of experimental sensitivity will allow discovery of very mild radioactivity of some isotopes now considered stable. For example, in 2003 it was reported that bismuth-209 (the only primordial isotope of bismuth) is very mildly radioactive, with half-life (1.9 ± 0.2) × 10^{19} yr, confirming earlier theoretical predictions from nuclear physics that bismuth-209 would very slowly alpha decay.

== Summary table for numbers of each class of nuclides ==
This is a summary table from List of nuclides. Numbers are not exact and may change slightly in the future, as nuclides are observed to be radioactive, or new half-lives are determined to some precision.

Type of nuclide by stability class	Number of nuclides in class	Running total of nuclides in all classes to this point	Notes
Theoretically stable according to known decay modes, including alpha decay, beta decay, isomeric transition, and double beta decay	146	146	All the first 66 elements, except technetium, promethium, samarium, and europium. If spontaneous fission is possible for the nuclides with mass numbers ≥ 93, then all such nuclides are unstable, so that only the first 40 elements would be stable. If protons decay, then there are no stable nuclides.
Energetically unstable to one or more known decay modes, but no decay yet seen. Considered stable until radioactivity confirmed.	105	251	Total is the observationally stable nuclides. All elements up to lead (except technetium and promethium) are included.
Radioactive primordial nuclides.	35	286	Includes bismuth, thorium, and uranium
Radioactive nonprimordial, but occur naturally on Earth.	~61 significant	~347 significant	Cosmogenic nuclides from cosmic rays; daughters of radioactive primordials such as francium, etc.

== Lists of stable nuclides ==
The list of nuclides includes all stable nuclides as well as primordial radionuclides, and radionuclides of various half-lifes, totaling 991 nuclides in order of stability, all with half-lives over one hour. The table is based on the standard NUBASE 2020.

== See also ==
- Mononuclidic element
- Periodic table
- Table of nuclides
- Valley of stability
