= Atomic mass =

Rest mass of an atom in its ground state

- Stylized lithium-7 atom: 3 protons, 4 neutrons, and 3 electrons (total electrons are ~1/4300 of the mass of the nucleus). It has a mass of 7.016 Da. Rare lithium-6 (mass of 6.015 Da) has only 3 neutrons, reducing the atomic weight (average) of lithium to 6.941.
- Common symbols: m_{a}, m
- SI unit: kilogram (kg)
- Other units: dalton (Da)
- Intensive?: yes
- Behaviour under coord transformation: scalar

Atomic mass (m_{a} or m) is the mass of a single atom. The atomic mass mostly comes from the combined mass of the protons and neutrons in the nucleus, with minor contributions from the electrons and nuclear binding energy. The atomic mass of atoms, ions, or atomic nuclei is slightly less than the sum of the masses of their constituent protons, neutrons, and electrons, due to mass defect (explained by mass–energy equivalence: E = mc^{2}).

Atomic mass is often measured in dalton (Da) (a.k.a. unified atomic mass unit (u)). One dalton is equal to 1/12 the mass of a carbon-12 atom in its natural state, given by the atomic mass constant m_{u} = m(^{12}C)/12 = 1 Da, where m(^{12}C) is the atomic mass of carbon-12. Thus, the numerical value of the atomic mass of a nuclide when expressed in daltons is close to its mass number.

The relative isotopic mass (see section below) can be obtained by dividing the atomic mass m_{a} of an isotope by the atomic mass constant m_{u}, yielding a dimensionless value. Thus, the atomic mass of a carbon-12 atom m(^{12}C) is 12 Da by definition, but the relative isotopic mass of a carbon-12 atom A_{r}(^{12}C) is simply 12. The sum of relative isotopic masses of all atoms in a molecule is the relative molecular mass.

The atomic mass of an isotope and the relative isotopic mass refers to a certain specific isotope of an element. Because substances are usually not isotopically pure, it is convenient to use the elemental atomic mass which is the average atomic mass of an element, weighted by the abundance of the isotopes. The dimensionless (standard) atomic weight is the weighted mean relative isotopic mass of a (typical naturally occurring) mixture of isotopes.

== Relative isotopic mass ==
Relative isotopic mass (a property of a single atom) is not to be confused with the averaged quantity atomic weight (see above), that is an average of values for many atoms in a given sample of a chemical element.

While atomic mass is an absolute mass, relative isotopic mass is a dimensionless number with no units. This loss of units results from the use of a scaling ratio with respect to a carbon-12 standard, and the word "relative" in the term "relative isotopic mass" refers to this scaling relative to carbon-12.

The relative isotopic mass, then, is the mass of a given isotope (specifically, any single nuclide), when this value is scaled by the mass of carbon-12, where the latter has to be determined experimentally. Equivalently, the relative isotopic mass of an isotope or nuclide is the mass of the isotope relative to 1/12 of the mass of a carbon-12 atom.

For example, the relative isotopic mass of a carbon-12 atom is exactly 12. For comparison, the atomic mass of a carbon-12 atom is exactly 12 daltons. Alternately, the atomic mass of a carbon-12 atom may be expressed in any other mass units: for example, the atomic mass of a carbon-12 atom is 1.99264688270(62)×10^{−26} kg.

As is the case for the related atomic mass when expressed in daltons, the relative isotopic mass numbers of nuclides other than carbon-12 are not whole numbers, but are always close to whole numbers. This is discussed fully below.

== Similar terms for different quantities ==
The atomic mass or relative isotopic mass are sometimes confused, or incorrectly used, as synonyms of relative atomic mass (also known as atomic weight) or the standard atomic weight (a particular variety of atomic weight, in the sense that it is standardized). However, as noted in the introduction, atomic mass is an absolute mass while all other terms are dimensionless. Relative atomic mass and standard atomic weight represent terms for (abundance-weighted) averages of relative atomic masses in elemental samples, not for single nuclides. Relative atomic mass and standard atomic weight will only be the same as the relative isotopic mass for elements with one stable isotope.

The atomic mass (relative isotopic mass) is defined as the mass of a single atom, which is only one isotope (nuclide), and is not an abundance-weighted average, as in the case of relative atomic mass/atomic weight. The atomic mass or relative isotopic mass of each isotope and nuclide of a chemical element is, therefore, a number that can be measured to high precision, since every specimen of such a nuclide is identical in mass to every other specimen, as all atoms of a given type in the same energy state, and every specimen of a particular nuclide, are identical in mass. For example, every atom of oxygen-16 has exactly the same atomic mass (relative isotopic mass).

For elements that have one naturally occurring isotope (mononuclidic elements) or one dominant isotope, the difference between the atomic mass of the most common isotope, and the (standard) relative atomic mass or (standard) atomic weight will be nil, or small enough to not effect most calculations. For elements with more than one isotope in significant quantities, the mass of individual atoms will be different from an average across all the isotopes.

For elements that have more than one common isotope, the numerical difference in relative atomic mass (atomic weight) from even the most common relative isotopic mass, can be half a mass unit or more (e.g. see the case of chlorine where atomic weight and standard atomic weight are about 35.45). The atomic mass (relative isotopic mass) of an uncommon isotope can differ from the relative atomic mass, atomic weight, or standard atomic weight, by several mass units.

Relative isotopic masses are always close to whole-number values, but never (except in the case of carbon-12) exactly a whole number, for two reasons:

- protons and neutrons have different masses, and different nuclides have different ratios of protons and neutrons.
- atomic masses are reduced, by the binding energies between the protons and neutrons.

The ratio of atomic mass to mass number (number of nucleons) varies from 0.9988381346(51) for ^{56}Fe to 1.007825031898(14) for ^{1}H.

Any mass defect due to nuclear binding energy is experimentally a small fraction (less than 1%) of the mass of an equal number of free nucleons. When compared to the average mass per nucleon in carbon-12, which is moderately strongly bound compared with other atoms, the mass defect of binding for most atoms is an even smaller fraction of a dalton. Since free protons and neutrons differ from each other in mass by a small fraction of a dalton (1.38844933(49)×10^{−3} Da), rounding the relative isotopic mass, or the atomic mass of any given nuclide given in daltons to the nearest whole number, always gives the nucleon count, or mass number. Additionally, the neutron count (neutron number) may then be derived by subtracting the number of protons (atomic number) from the mass number (nucleon count).

== Mass defect ==
Binding energy per nucleon of common isotopes. A graph of the ratio of mass number to atomic mass would be similar.

The amount that the ratio of atomic masses to mass number deviates from 1 is as follows: the deviation starts positive at hydrogen-1, then decreases until it reaches a local minimum at helium-4. Isotopes of lithium, beryllium, and boron are less strongly bound than helium, as shown by their increasing mass-to-mass number ratios.

At carbon, the ratio of mass (in daltons) to mass number is defined as 1, and after carbon it becomes less than one until a minimum is reached at iron-56 (with only slightly higher values for iron-58 and nickel-62), then increases to positive values in the heavy isotopes, with increasing atomic number. This corresponds to the fact that nuclear fission in an element heavier than zirconium produces energy, and fission in any element lighter than niobium requires energy. On the other hand, nuclear fusion of two atoms of an element lighter than scandium (except for helium) produces energy, whereas fusion in elements heavier than calcium requires energy. The fusion of two atoms of ^{4}He yielding beryllium-8 would require energy, and the beryllium would quickly fall apart again. ^{4}He can fuse with tritium (^{3}H) or with ^{3}He; these processes occurred during Big Bang nucleosynthesis. The formation of elements with more than seven nucleons requires the fusion of three atoms of ^{4}He in the triple-alpha process, skipping over lithium, beryllium, and boron to produce carbon-12.

Here are some values of the ratio of atomic mass to mass number:

Nuclide	Ratio of atomic mass to mass number
^{1}H	1.007825031898(14)
^{2}H	1.0070508889220(75)
^{3}H	1.005349760440(27)
^{3}He	1.005343107322(20)
^{4}He	1.000650813533(40)
^{6}Li	1.00252048124(26)
^{12}C	1
^{14}N	1.000219571732(17)
^{16}O	0.999682163704(20)
^{56}Fe	0.9988381346(51)
^{210}Po	0.9999184461(59)
^{232}Th	1.0001640242(66)
^{238}U	1.0002133905(67)

== Measurement of atomic masses ==
Direct comparison and measurement of the masses of atoms is achieved with mass spectrometry.

== Relationship between atomic and molecular masses ==
Similar definitions apply to molecules. One can calculate the molecular mass of a compound by adding the atomic masses (not the standard atomic weights) of its constituent atoms. Conversely, the molar mass is usually computed from the standard atomic weights (not the atomic or nuclide masses). Thus, molecular mass and molar mass differ slightly in numerical value and represent different concepts. Molecular mass is the mass of a molecule, which is the sum of its constituent atomic masses. Molar mass is an average of the masses of the constituent molecules in a chemically pure but isotopically heterogeneous ensemble. In both cases, the multiplicity of the atoms (the number of times it occurs) must be taken into account, usually by multiplication of each unique mass by its multiplicity.

Molar mass of CH_{4}
	Standard atomic weight	Number	Total molar mass [g/mol] or molecular weight (unitless)
C	12.011	1	12.011
H	1.008	4	4.032
CH_{4}			16.043
Molecular mass of ^{12}C^{1}H_{4}
	Nuclide mass (Da or u)	Number	Total molecular mass (Da or u)
^{12}C	12.0000	1	12.0000
^{1}H	1.007825	4	4.0313
CH_{4}			16.0313

== History ==
The first scientists to determine relative atomic masses were John Dalton and Thomas Thomson between 1803 and 1805 and Jöns Jakob Berzelius between 1808 and 1826. Relative atomic mass (Atomic weight) was originally defined relative to that of the lightest element, hydrogen, which was taken as 1.00, and in the 1820s, Prout's hypothesis stated that atomic masses of all elements would prove to be exact multiples of that of hydrogen. Berzelius, however, soon proved that this was not even approximately true, and for some elements, such as chlorine, relative atomic mass, at about 35.5, falls almost exactly halfway between two integral multiples of that of hydrogen. Still later, this was shown to be largely due to a mix of isotopes, and that the atomic masses of pure isotopes, or nuclides, are multiples of the hydrogen mass, to within about 1%.

In the 1860s, Stanislao Cannizzaro refined relative atomic masses by applying Avogadro's law (notably at the Karlsruhe Congress of 1860). He formulated a law to determine relative atomic masses of elements: the different quantities of the same element contained in different molecules are all whole multiples of the atomic weight and determined relative atomic masses and molecular masses by comparing the vapor density of a collection of gases with molecules containing one or more of the chemical element in question.

In the 20th century, until the 1960s, chemists and physicists used two different atomic-mass scales. The chemists used an "atomic mass unit" (amu) scale such that the natural mixture of oxygen isotopes had an atomic mass 16, while the physicists assigned the same number 16 to only the atomic mass of the most common oxygen isotope (^{16}O, containing eight protons and eight neutrons). However, because oxygen-17 and oxygen-18 are also present in natural oxygen this led to two different tables of atomic mass. The unified scale based on carbon-12, ^{12}C, met the physicists' need to base the scale on a pure isotope, while being numerically close to the chemists' scale. This was adopted as the 'unified atomic mass unit'. The current International System of Units (SI) primary recommendation for the name of this unit is the dalton and symbol 'Da'. The name 'unified atomic mass unit' and symbol 'u' are recognized names and symbols for the same unit.

The term atomic weight is being phased out slowly and being replaced by relative atomic mass, in most current usage. This shift in nomenclature reaches back to the 1960s and has been the source of much debate in the scientific community, which was triggered by the adoption of the unified atomic mass unit and the realization that weight was in some ways an inappropriate term. The argument for keeping the term "atomic weight" was primarily that it was a well understood term to those in the field, that the term "atomic mass" was already in use (as it is currently defined) and that the term "relative atomic mass" might be easily confused with relative isotopic mass (the mass of a single atom of a given nuclide, expressed dimensionlessly relative to 1/12 of the mass of carbon-12; see section above).

In 1979, as a compromise, the term "relative atomic mass" was introduced as a secondary synonym for atomic weight. Twenty years later the primacy of these synonyms was reversed, and the term "relative atomic mass" is now the preferred term.

However, the term "standard atomic weights" (referring to the standardized expectation atomic weights of differing samples) has not been changed, because simple replacement of "atomic weight" with "relative atomic mass" would have resulted in the term "standard relative atomic mass".

== See also ==
- Atomic number
- Dalton (unit)
- Isotope
- Isotope geochemistry
- Molecular mass
- Jean Stas
