= Hydrogen isotope biogeochemistry =

Study of the hydrogen isotopes fractionation

Hydrogen isotope biogeochemistry (HIBGC) is the scientific study of biological, geological, and chemical processes in the environment using the distribution and relative abundance of hydrogen isotopes. Hydrogen has two stable isotopes, protium ^{1}H and deuterium ^{2}H, which vary in relative abundance on the order of hundreds of permil. The ratio between these two species can be called the hydrogen isotopic signature of a substance. Understanding isotopic fingerprints and the sources of fractionation that lead to variation between them can be applied to address a diverse array of questions ranging from ecology and hydrology to geochemistry and paleoclimate reconstructions. Since specialized techniques are required to measure natural hydrogen isotopic composition (HIC), HIBGC provides uniquely specialized tools to more traditional fields like ecology and geochemistry.

== History of hydrogen isotopes ==
=== Earliest work ===
The study of hydrogen stable isotopes began with the discovery of deuterium by chemist Harold Urey. Even though the neutron was not realized until 1932, Urey began searching for "heavy hydrogen" in 1931. Urey and his colleague George Murphy calculated the redshift of heavy hydrogen from the Balmer series and observed very faint lines on a spectrographic study. To intensify the spectroscopic lines for publishable data, Murphy and Urey paired with Ferdinand Brickwedde and distilled a more concentrated pool of heavy hydrogen, now called deuterium. This work on hydrogen isotopes won Urey the 1934 Nobel Prize in Chemistry.

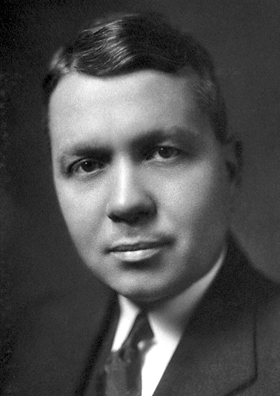
Harold Urey, whose pioneering work on hydrogen isotopes won him the 1934 Nobel Prize in Chemistry.

Also in 1934, scientists Ernest Rutherford, Mark Oliphant, and Paul Harteck, produced the radioisotope tritium (hydrogen-3, ^{3}H) by hitting deuterium with high-energy nuclei. The deuterium used in the experiment was a generous gift of heavy water from UC Berkeley physicist Gilbert N. Lewis. Bombarding deuterium produced two previously undetected isotopes, helium-3 (^{3}He) and ^{3}H. Rutherford and his colleagues successfully created ^{3}H, but incorrectly assumed that ^{3}He was the radioactive component. The work of Luis Walter Alvarez and Robert Cornog first isolated ^{3}H and reversed Rutherford's incorrect notion. Alvarez reasoned that tritium was radioactive, but did not measure the half-life, though calculations at the time suggested >10 years. At the end of World War II, physical chemist Willard Libby detected the residual radioactivity of a tritium sample with a Geiger counter, providing a more accurate understanding of the half-life, now accepted as 12.3 years.

=== Impact on physical chemistry ===
The discovery of hydrogen isotopes also impacted physics in the 1940s, as nuclear magnetic resonance spectroscopy was first invented. Organic chemists now use nuclear magnetic resonance (NMR) to map protein interactions or identify small compounds, but NMR was first a passion project of physicists. All three isotopes of hydrogen were found to have magnetic properties suitable for NMR spectroscopy. The first chemist to fully express an application of NMR was George Pake, who measured gypsum ($\ce{CaSO4.2H2O}$) as a crystal and powder. The signal observed, called the Pake doublet, was from the magnetically active hydrogens in water. Pake then calculated the proton-proton bond length. NMR measurements were further revolutionized when commercial machines became available in the 1960s. Before this, NMR experiments involved constructing massive projects, locating large magnets, and hand wiring miles of copper coil. Proton NMR remained the most popular technique throughout advancements in following decades, but ^{2}H and ^{3}H were used in other flavors of NMR spectroscopy. ^{2}H has a different magnetic moment and spin than ^{1}H, but generally a much smaller signal. Historically, deuterium NMR is a poor alternative to proton NMR, but has been used to study the behavior of lipids on cell membranes. A variant of ^{2}H NMR called ^{2}H-SNIF has shown potential for understating position-specific isotope compositions and comprehending biosynthetic pathways. Tritium is also used in NMR, as it is the only nucleus more sensitive than ^{1}H, generating very large signals. However, tritium's radioactivity discouraged many studies of ^{3}H-NMR.

While tritium's radioactivity discourages use in spectroscopy, tritium is essential for nuclear weapons. Scientists began understanding nuclear energy as early as the 1800s, but large advancements were made in studies of the atomic bomb in the early 1940s. Wartime research, especially the Manhattan Project, greatly advanced the understanding of radioactivity. ^{3}H is a byproduct in reactors, a result of hitting lithium-6 with neutrons, producing almost 5 MeV of energy.

$${}^6\mathrm{Li} + n \longrightarrow {}^4\mathrm{He} + {}^3\mathrm{H} + 5\ \mathrm{MeV}$$

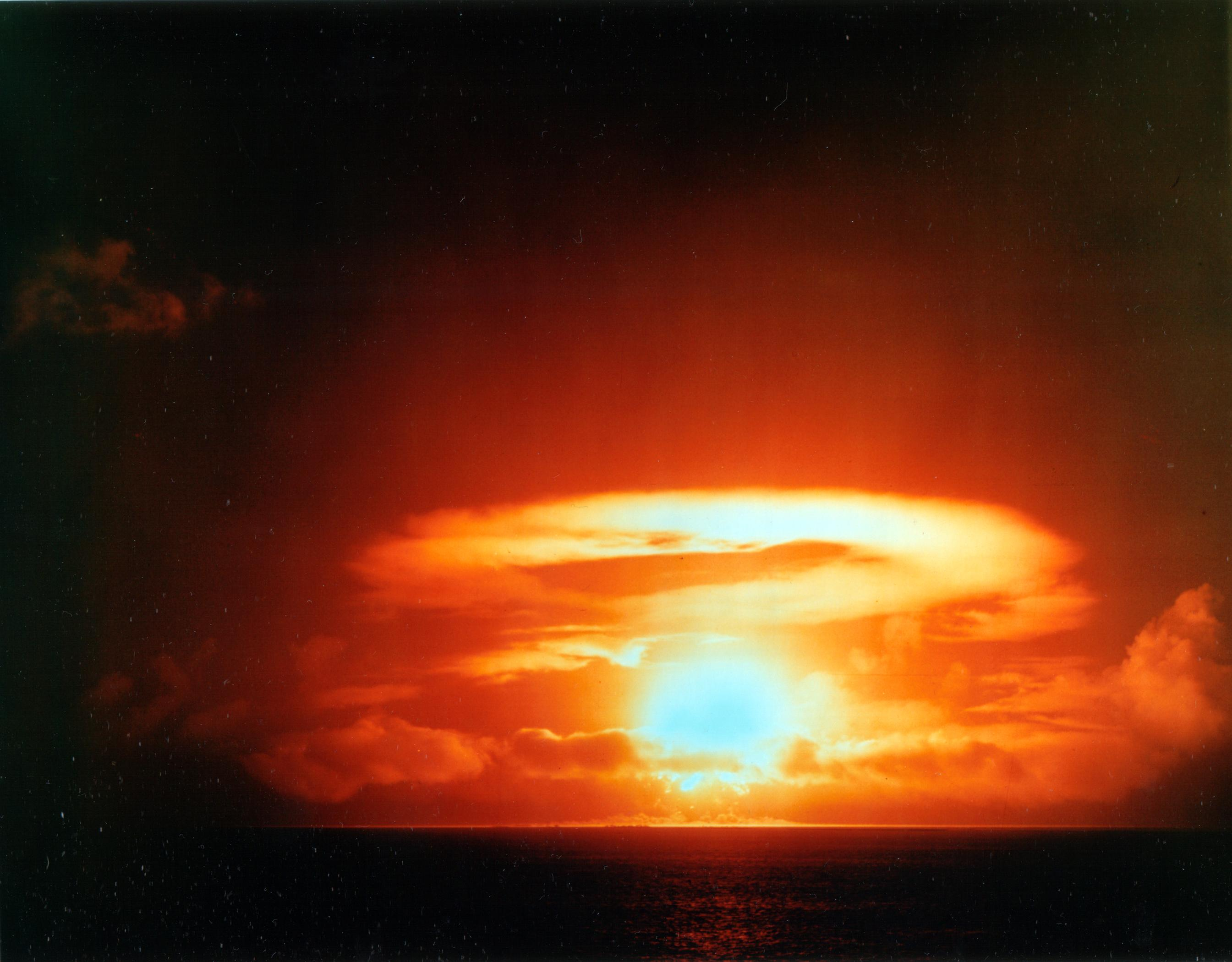
A photo from the Greenhouse Project in 1952, where the first boosted-fission weapon was tested.

In boosted fission weapons a mix of ^{2}H and ^{3}H is heated until there is thermonuclear fusion to produce helium and free neutrons. These fast neutrons then cause further fission, creating "boosting". In 1951, in Operation Greenhouse, a prototype named George, validated the proof of concept for such a weapon. However, the first true boosted fission bomb, Greenhouse Item, was successfully tested in 1952, giving a 45.5-kiloton yield, nearly double that of an unboosted bomb. The United States stopped producing tritium in nuclear reactors in 1988, but nuclear tests in the 1950s added large spikes of radionuclides to the air, especially carbon-14 and ^{3}H. This complicated measurements for geologists using carbon dating. However, some oceanographers benefited from the ^{3}H increase, using the signal in the water to trace physical mixing of water masses.

=== Impact on biogeochemistry ===
In biogeochemistry, scientists focused mainly on deuterium as a tracer for environmental processes, especially the water cycle. American geochemist Harmon Craig, once a graduate student of Urey, discovered the relationship between rainwater's hydrogen and oxygen isotope ratios. The linear correlation between the two heavy isotopes occurs worldwide and is called the global meteoric water line. By the late 1960s, the focus of hydrogen isotopes shifted away from water and toward organic molecules. Plants use water to form biomass, but a 1967 study by Zebrowski, Ponticorvo, and Rittenberg found that the organic material in plants had less ^{2}H than the water source. Zebrowski's research measured the deuterium concentration of fatty acids and amino acids derived from sediments in the Mohole drilling project. Further studies by Bruce Smith and Samuel Epstein in 1970 confirmed the depletion of ^{2}H in organics compared to environmental water. Another duo in 1970, Schiegl and Vogel, analyzed the HIC as water became biomass, as biomass became coal and oil, and as oil became natural gas. In each step they found ^{2}H further depleted. A landmark paper in 1980 by Marilyn Epstep, now M. Fogel, and Thomas Hoering titled "Biogeochemistry of the stable hydrogen isotopes" refined the links between organic materials and sources.

In this early stage of hydrogen stable isotope study, most isotope compositions or fractionations were reported as bulk measurements of all organic or all inorganic matter. Some exceptions include cellulose and methane, as these compounds are easily separated. Another advantage of methane for compound-specific measurements is the lack of hydrogen exchange. Cellulose has exchangeable hydrogen, but chemical derivatization can prevent swapping of cellulose hydrogen with water or mineral hydrogen sources. Cellulose and methane studies in the 1970s and 1980s set the standard for modern hydrogen isotope geochemistry.

Measurement of individual compounds was made possible in the late 1990s and early 2000s with advances in mass spectrometry. The Thermo Delta+XL transformed measurements as the first instrument capable of compound specific isotope analysis. It was then possible to look at smaller samples with more precision. Hydrogen isotope applications quickly emerged in petroleum geochemistry by measuring oil, paleoclimatology by observing lipid biomarkers, and ecology by constructing trophic dynamics. Advances are underway in the clumped-isotope composition of methane after development of the carbonate thermometer. Precise measurements are also enabling focus on microbial biosynthetic pathways involving hydrogen. Ecologists studying trophic levels are especially interested in compound specific measurements for reconstructing past diets and tracing predator-prey relationships. Highly advanced machines now promise position-specific hydrogen-isotope analysis of biomolecules and natural gas.

== Important concepts ==
=== Stable vs radioactive isotopes ===
All isotopes of an element have the same number of protons with varying numbers of neutrons. Hydrogen has three naturally occurring isotopes: ^{1}H, ^{2}H and ^{3}H; called protium (H), deuterium (D) and tritium (T), respectively. Both ^{1}H and ^{2}H are stable, while ^{3}H is unstable and beta-decays to ^{3}He. While there are some important applications of ^{3}H in geochemistry (such as its use as an ocean circulation tracer) these will not be discussed further here.

=== Isotope notation ===
The study of stable isotope biogeochemistry involves the description of the relative abundances of various isotopes in a certain chemical pool, as well as the way in which physicochemical processes change the fraction of those isotopes in one pool vs. another. Various type of notation have been developed to describe the abundance and change in the abundance of isotopes in these processes, and these are summarized below. In most cases only the relative amounts of an isotope are of interest, the absolute concentration of any one isotope is of little importance.

==== Isotope ratio and fractional abundance ====
The most fundamental description of hydrogen isotopes in a system is the relative abundance of ^{2}H and ^{1}H. This value can be reported as isotope ratio ^{2}R or fractional abundance ^{2}F defined as:

$$\ce{^2R\ =\ \frac{^2H}{^1H}}$$

and

$$\ce{^2F\ =\ \frac{^2H}{{^1H}+{^2H}}}$$

where ^{x}H is amount of isotope ^{x}H. Fractional abundance is equivalent to mole fraction, and yields atom percent when multiplied by 100. In some instances atom percent excess is used, which reports the atom percent of a sample minus the atom percent of a standard.

==== Delta (δ) notation ====
Isotope ratios for a substance are often reported compared to a standard with known isotopic composition, and measurements of relative masses are always made in conjuncture with measuring a standard. For hydrogen, the Vienna Standard Mean Ocean Water standard is used which has an isotope ratio of 155.76±0.1 ppm. The delta value as compared to this standard is defined as:

$$\ce{\delta^2H_{VSMOW}\ =\ \frac{^2R_{sample}}{^2R_{VSMOW}}-1}$$

These delta values are often quite small, and are usually reported as per mil values (‰) which come from multiplying the above equation by a factor of 1000.

==== Measures of fractionation ====
The study of HIBGC relies on the fact that various physicochemical processes preferentially enrich or deplete ^{2}H relative to ^{1}H (see kinetic isotope effect [KIE], etc.). Various measures have been developed to describe the fractionation in an isotope between two pools, often the product and reactant of a physiochemical process. α notation describes the difference between two hydrogen pools A and B with the equation:

$$\ce{\alpha_{A/B}\ =\ \frac{^2R^{A}}{^2R^{B}}}$$

where δ^{2}H^{A} is the delta value of pool A relative to VSMOW. As many delta values do not vary greatly from one another the α value is often very close to unity. A related measure called epsilon (ε) is often used which is given simply by:

$$\epsilon_{A/B} = \alpha_{A/B}-1$$

These values are often very close to zero, and are reported as per mill values by multiplying α − 1 by 1000. One final measure is Δ, pronounced "cap delta", which is simply:

$$\ce{\Delta_{A/B}\ =\ \delta^2H^{A}-\delta^2H^{B}}$$

=== Conservation of mass in mixing calculations ===
^{2}H and ^{1}H are stable isotopes. Therefore, the ^{2}H/^{1}H ratio of a pool containing hydrogen, remains constant as long as no hydrogen is added or removed, a property known as conservation of mass. When two pools of hydrogen A and B mix with molar amounts of hydrogen m_{A} and m_{B}, each with their own starting fractional abundance of deuterium (F_{A} and F_{B}), then the fractional abundance of the resulting mixture is given by the following exact equation:

$$m_\Sigma F_\Sigma = m_AF_A+m_BF_B$$

The terms with Σ represent the values for the combined pools. The following approximation is often used for calculations regarding the mixing of two pools with a known isotopic composition:

$$m_\Sigma \delta_\Sigma = m_A \delta_A+m_B \delta_B$$

This approximation is convenient and applicable with little error in most applications having to deal with pools of hydrogen from natural processes. The maximum difference between the calculated delta (δ) value with the approximate and exact equations is given by the following equation:

$$\delta_\text{error} = (R_\text{std})[(\delta_A-\delta_B)/2]^2$$

This error is quite small for nearly all mixing of naturally occurring isotope values, even for hydrogen which can have quite large natural variations in δ values. The estimation is usually avoided when unnaturally large δ values are encountered, which is especially common in isotopic labeling experiments.

=== Naturally occurring isotope variation ===
Natural processes result in broad variations in the D/H ratio (DHR) in different pools of hydrogen. KIEs and physical changes such as precipitation and evaporation lead to these observed variations. Seawater varies slightly, between 0 and −10 per mil, while atmospheric water can vary between about −200‰ to +100‰. Biomolecules synthesized by organisms, retain some of the D/H signature of the water which they were grown on, plus a large fractionation factor which can be as great as several hundred ‰. Large D/H differences, of thousands of ‰, can be found between Earth and other planetary bodies such as Mars, likely due to variations in isotope fractionation during planet formation and the loss of hydrogen into space.

=== List of well known fractionation effects ===
A number of common processes fractionate hydrogen isotopes to produce the isotope variations found in nature. Common physical processes include precipitation and evaporation. Chemical reactions can also heavily influence the partitioning of heavy and light isotopes between pools. The rate of a chemical reaction depends in part on the energies of the chemical bonds formed and broken in the reaction. Since different isotopes have different masses, the bond energies differ between isotopologues of a chemical species. This will result in a difference in the rate of a reaction for the different isotopologues, resulting in a fractionation of the different isotopes between the reactant and product in a chemical reaction. This is known as the kinetic isotope effect (KIE). A classic example of KIE is the DHR difference in the equilibrium between H_{2}O and H_{2} which can have an α value of as much as 3–4.

=== Isotope ratio as tracer for fingerprint ===
In many areas of study the origin of a chemical or group of chemicals is of central importance. Questions such as the source of environmental pollutants, the origin of hormones in an athlete's body, or the authenticity of foods and flavorings are all examples where chemical compounds need to be identified and sourced. Hydrogen isotopes have found uses in these and many other diverse areas of study. Since many processes can affect the DHR of a given compound this ratio can be a diagnostic signature for compounds produced in a specific location or via a certain process. Once the DHRs of a number of sources are known the measurement of this ratio for a sample of unknown origin can often be used to link it back to a certain source or production method.

== Physical chemistry ==
=== Hydrogen isotope formation ===
^{1}H, with one proton and no neutrons, is the most abundant nuclide in the Solar System, formed in the earliest rounds of stellar explosions after the Big Bang. After the universe exploded into life, the hot and dense cloud of particles began to cool, first forming subatomic particles like quarks and electrons, which then condensed to form protons and neutrons. Elements larger than hydrogen and helium were produced with successive stars, forming from the energy released during supernovae.

Deuterium, ^{2}H, with one proton and one neutron, is also known to have cosmic origin. Like protium, deuterium was produced very early in the universe's history, during Big Bang nucleosynthesis (BBN). As protons and neutrons combined, helium-4 was produced with a deuterium intermediate. Alpha reactions with ^{4}He produce many of the larger elements that dominate today's Solar System. However, before the universe cooled, high-energy photons destroyed any deuterium, preventing larger element formation. This is called the deuterium bottleneck, a restriction on the timeline for nucleosynthesis. All of today's deuterium originated from this proton-proton fusion after enough cooling.

Tritium, ^{3}H, with one proton and two neutrons, was produced by proton and neutron collisions in the early universe as well, but it has since radioactively decayed to helium-3. Today's tritium cannot be from BBN, due to tritium's short half-life, 12.3 years. Today's ^{3}H concentration is instead governed by nuclear reactions and cosmic rays. The beta decay of ^{3}H to ^{3}He releases an electron and an antineutrino, and about 18 keV of energy. This is a low-energy decay, so the radiation cannot permeate skin. Tritium is thus only hazardous if directly ingested or inhaled.

$${}^3\mathrm{H}  \longrightarrow {}^3\mathrm{He} + {e}^- + 18\ \mathrm{keV}$$

=== Quantum properties ===
^{1}H is a spin-1/2 subatomic particle and therefore a fermion. Other fermions include neutrons, electrons, and tritium. Fermions are governed by the Pauli exclusion principle, where no two particles can have the same quantum number. However, bosons like deuterium and photons, are not bound by exclusion and multiple particles can occupy the same energy state. This fundamental difference in ^{1}H and ^{2}H manifests in many physical properties. Integer-spin particles like deuterium follow Bose–Einstein statistics while fermions with half-integer spins follow Fermi–Dirac statistics. Wave functions that describe multiple fermions must be antisymmetric with respect to swapping particles, while boson wave functions are symmetric. Because bosons are indistinguishable and can occupy the same state, collections of bosons behave very differently than fermions at colder temperatures. As bosons are cooled and relaxed to the lowest energy state, phenomena like superfluidity and superconductivity occur.

=== Kinetic and equilibrium isotope effects ===
Isotopes differ by number of neutrons, which directly impacts physical properties based on mass and size. Normal hydrogen (protium, ^{1}H) has no neutron. Deuterium (^{2}H) has one neutron, and tritium (^{3}H) has two. Neutrons add mass to the atom, leading to different chemical physical properties. This effect is especially strong for hydrogen isotopes, since the added neutron doubles the mass from ^{1}H to ^{2}H. For heavier elements like carbon, nitrogen, oxygen, or sulfur, the mass difference is diluted.

Physical chemists often model chemical bonding with the quantum harmonic oscillator (QHO), simplifying a hydrogen-hydrogen bond as two balls connected by a spring. The QHO is based on Hooke's law and is a good approximation of the Morse potential that accurately describes bonding. Modeling H/^{2}H in a chemical reaction demonstrates the energy distributions of isotopes in products and reactants. Lower energy levels for the heavier isotope ^{2}H can be explained mathematically by the QHO's dependence on the inverse of the reduced mass μ. Thus, a larger reduced mass is a larger denominator and thus a smaller zero point energy and a lower energy state in the quantum well.

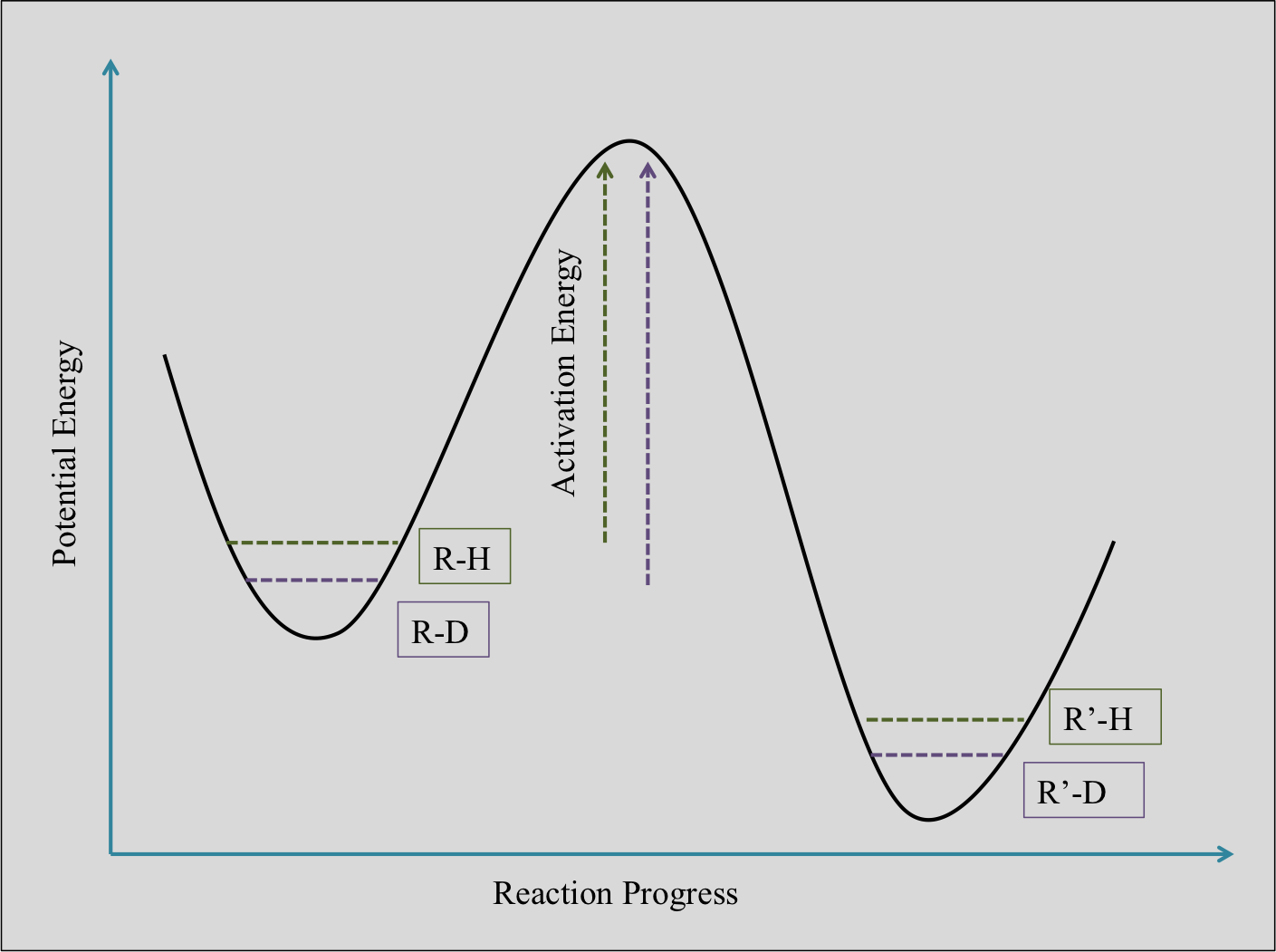
A simplified model of a chemical reaction with pathways for H and D (^{2}H). The positions on the energy wells are based on the QHO. Note the lower energy state of the heavy isotope and the higher energy state of the light isotope. Under equilibrium conditions, the heavy isotope is favored in the products as it is more stable. Under kinetic conditions, like an enzymatic reaction, the light isotope is favored due to lower activation energy.

Calculating the reduced mass of a ^{1}H–^{1}H bond versus a ^{2}H–^{2}H bond gives:

$$\mu_\ce{H} = \cfrac{m_\ce{H} m_\ce{H}}{m_\ce{H} +m_\ce{H}} = \cfrac{1}{2}.\!\,$$
$$\mu_\ce{D} = \cfrac{m_\ce{D} m_\ce{D}}{m_\ce{D} +m_\ce{D}} = \cfrac{4}{4} = 1.\!\,$$

The quantum harmonic oscillator has energy levels of the following form, where k is the spring constant and h is the Planck constant.

$$E_n = \hbar \sqrt{k \over \mu} \left(n + {1\over 2}\right).$$

The effects of this energy distribution manifest in the kinetic isotope effect (KIE) and the equilibrium isotope effect. In a reversible reaction, under equilibrium conditions, the reaction proceeds forward and backward, distributing the isotopes to minimize thermodynamic free energy. Some time later, at equilibrium, more heavy isotopes will be on the product side. The stability of the lower energy drives the products to be enriched in ^{2}H relative to reactants. Conversely, under kinetic conditions, reactions are generally irreversible. The limiting step in the reaction is overcoming the activation energy barrier to reach an intermediate state. The lighter isotope has a higher energy state in the quantum well and will thus be preferentially formed into products. Thus under kinetic conditions the product will be relatively depleted in ^{2}H.

KIEs are common in biological systems and are especially important for HIBGC. KIEs usually result in larger fractionations than equilibrium reactions. In any isotope system, KIEs are stronger for larger mass differences. Light isotopes in most systems also tend to move faster but form weaker bonds. At high temperature, entropy explains a large signal in isotope composition. However, when temperature decreases isotope effects are more expressed and randomness plays less of a role. These general trends are exposed in further understanding of bond breaking, diffusion or effusion, and condensation or evaporation reactions.

=== Chemistry of hydrogen exchange ===
One of the major complications in studying hydrogen isotopes is the issue of exchangeability. At many time scales, ranging from hours to geological epochs, scientists have to consider if the hydrogen moieties in studied molecules are the original species or if they represent exchange with water or mineral hydrogen near by. Research in this area is still inconclusive in regards to rates of exchange, but it is generally understood that hydrogen exchange complicates the preservation of information in isotope studies.

==== Rapid exchange ====
Hydrogen atoms easily separate from electronegative bonds such as hydroxyl bonds (O–H), nitrogen bonds (N–H), and thiol/mercapto bonds (S–H) on hour to day long timescales. This rapid exchange is particularly problematic for measurements of bulk organic matter with these functional groups because isotope compositions are more likely to reflect the source water and not the isotope effect. Therefore, records of paleoclimate that are not measuring ancient waters, rely on other isotopic markers. Advancements in the 1990s held promising potential to resolve this problem: samples were equilibrated with two variations of heavy water and compared. Their ratios represent an exchange factor that can calibrate measurements to correct for H/^{2}H swapping.

==== Carbon bound hydrogen exchange ====
For some time, researchers believed that large hydrocarbon molecules were impervious to hydrogen exchange, but recent work has identified many reactions that allow isotope reordering. The isotopic exchange becomes relevant at geologic time scales and has impacted work of biologists studying lipid biomarkers, and geologists studying ancient oil. Reactions responsible for exchange include

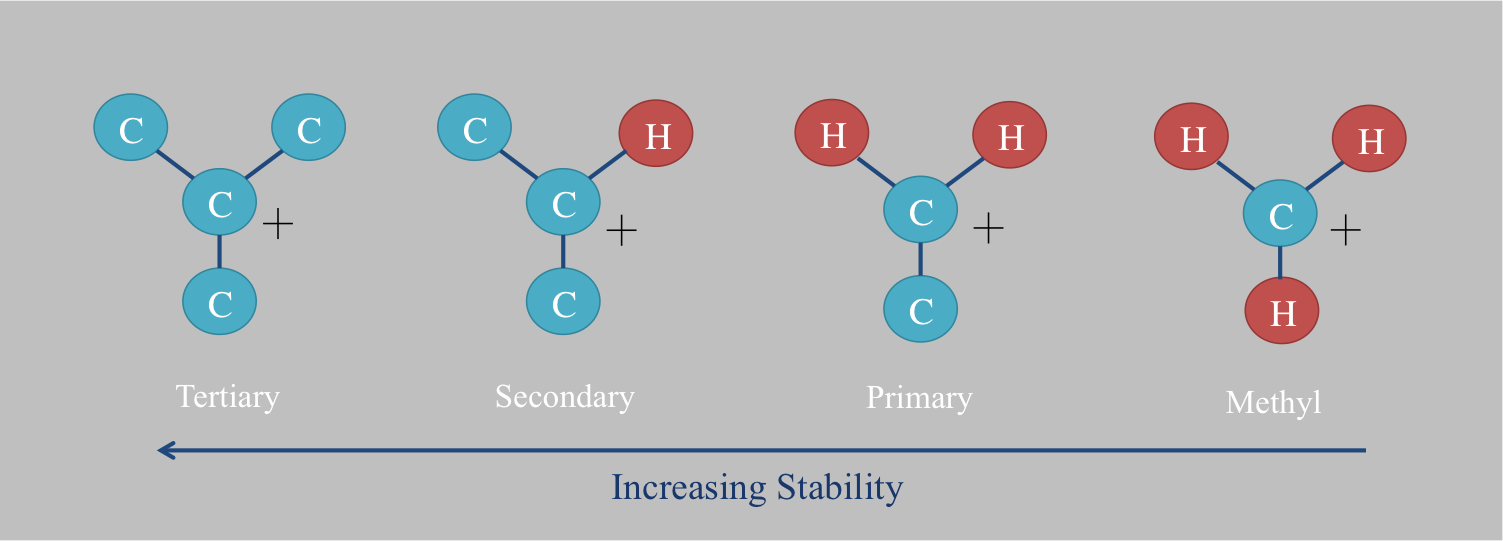
The trend of carbocation stability. Note the stabilization effects from adjacent carbons that donate electrons to the positive charge. The opposite trend is seen in carbanion stability. In isotopes, a tertiary bound hydrogen is more likely to be lost because the resulting carbocation is the most stable species.

1. Radical reactions that cleave C–H bonds.
2. Ion exchange that of tertiary and aromatic hydrogen.
3. Enolizations that activate hydrogens on ketone alpha carbons.
4. Stereochemical exchange that causes stereochemical inversion.
5. Constitutional exchange like methyl shifts, double bond migrations and carbon backbone rearrangements.

Detailed kinetics of these reactions have not been determined. However, it is known that clay minerals catalyze ionic hydrogen exchange faster than other minerals. Thus hydrocarbons formed in clastic environments exchange more than those in carbonate settings. Aromatic and tertiary hydrogen also have greater exchange rates than primary hydrogen. This is due to the increasing stability of associated carbocations. Primary carbocations are considered too unstable to exist and have never been isolated in an FT-ICR spectrometer. On the other hand, tertiary carbocations are relatively stable and are often intermediates in organic chemistry reactions. This stability, which increases the likelihood of proton loss, is due to the electron donation of nearby carbon atoms. Resonance and nearby lone pairs can also stabilize carbocations via electron donation. Aromatic carbons are thus relatively easy to exchange.

Many of these reactions have a strong temperature dependence; higher temperature typically accelerates exchange. However, different mechanisms may prevail at each temperature window. Ion exchange, for example, is most significant at low temperature. In such low-temperature environments, there is potential for preserving the original hydrogen isotope signal over hundreds of millions of years. However, many rocks in geologic time have reached significant thermal maturity. Even by the onset of the oil window it appears that much of the hydrogen has exchanged. Recently, scientists have explored a silver lining: hydrogen exchange is a zero order kinetic reaction (for carbon bound hydrogen at 80–100°C, the half-times are likely 10^{4}–10^{5} years). Applying the mathematics of rate constants would allow extrapolation to original isotopic compositions. While this solution holds promise, there is too much disagreement in the literature for robust calibrations.

=== Vapor isotope effects ===
Vapor isotope effects occur for ^{1}H, ^{2}H, and ^{3}H; since each isotope has different thermodynamic properties in the liquid and gas phases. For water, the condensed phase is more enriched while the vapor is more depleted. For example, rain condensing from a cloud, is heavier than the vapor starting point. Generally, the large variations in deuterium concentration in water are from fractionations between liquid, vapor, and solid reservoirs. In contrast to the fractionation pattern of water, non-polar molecules like oils and lipids, have gaseous counterparts enriched with deuterium relative to the liquid. This is thought to be associated with the polarity from hydrogen bonding in water that does not interfere in long-chain hydrocarbons.

== Observed variations in isotope abundance ==
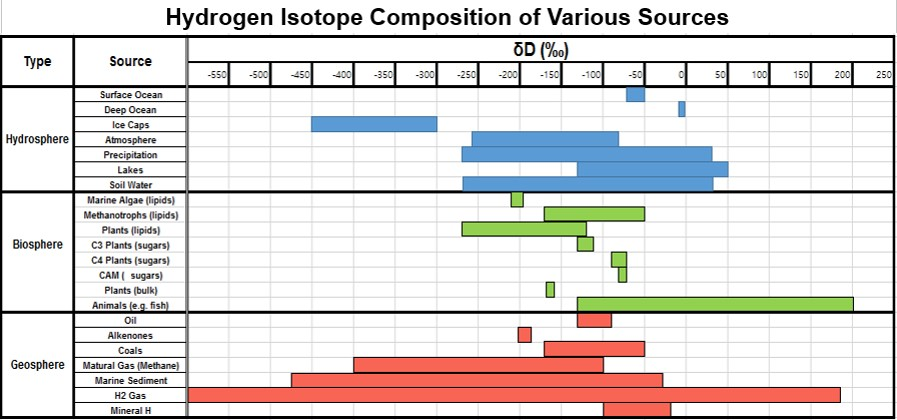
HIC of hydro-, bio- and geo-spheres

Due to physical and chemical fractionation processes, the variations in the isotopic compositions of elements are reported, and the standard atomic weights of hydrogen isotopes have been published by IUPAC's Commission on Atomic Weights and Isotopic Abundances. The HICs are reported relative to the International Atomic Energy Agency (IAEA) reference water. In the equilibrium isotope reactions of H/^{2}H in general, enrichment of the heavy isotope is observed in the compound with the higher oxidation state. However, in our natural environment, HIC varies greatly depending on the sources and organisms due to complexities of interacting elements in disequilibrium states. In this section, the observed variations in HIC of water sources (hydrosphere), living organisms (biosphere), organic substances (geosphere), and extraterrestrial materials in the Solar system are described.

=== Hydrosphere ===
==== Oceans ====
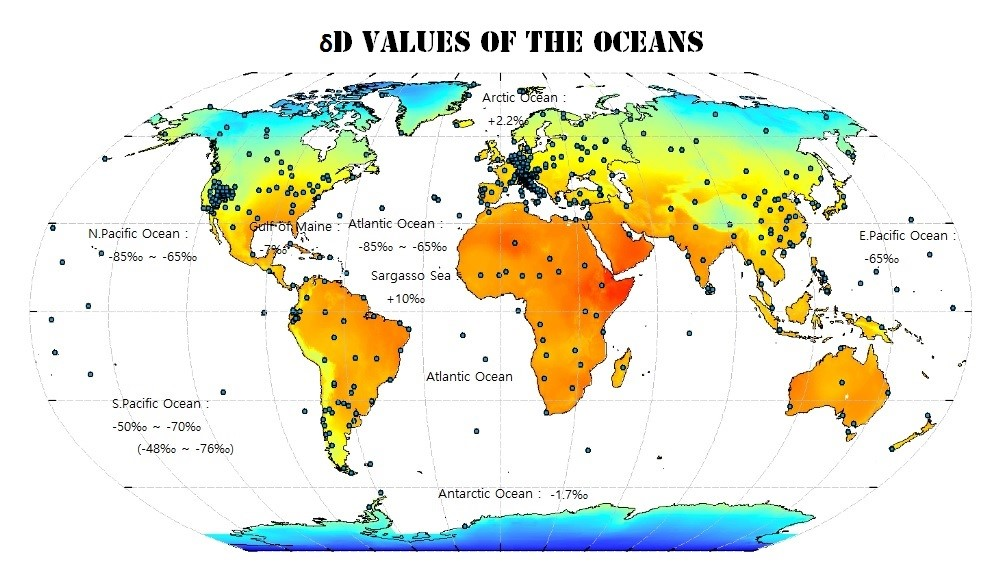

Variations in δD of different water sources and ice caps are observed due to evaporation and condensation processes. (See section 6 for more details.) When seawater is well-mixed, the δD at equilibrium is near 0‰ (‰ SMOW) with a DHR of 155.76 ppm. However, continuous variations in δD are caused by evaporation or precipitation processes which lead to disequilibrium in fractionation processes. A large HIC gradient occurs in surface waters of the oceans, and the fluctuation value in the Northwest Atlantic surface water is around 20‰. According to the data examining the southern supersegment of the Pacific Ocean, as latitude decreases from 65˚S to 40˚S, δD fluctuates between around −50‰ and −70‰.

The HIC of seawater (not just surface water) is mostly in the range of 0‰ to −10‰. The estimates of δD for different parts of the ocean across the world are shown on the map.

==== Ice caps ====
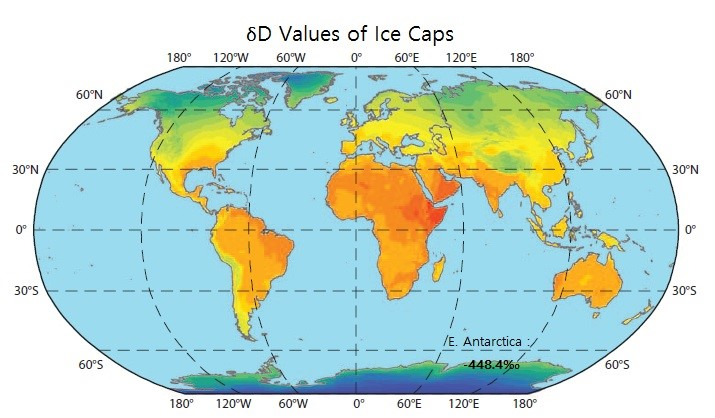

Typical δDs for ice sheets in the polar regions range from around −400‰ to −300‰ (‰SMOW). Ice caps' δDs are affected by distance from open ocean, latitude, atmospheric circulation, and the amount of insolation and temperature. The temperature change affects the HIC of ice caps, so the HIC of ice can give estimates for the historical climate cycles such as the timelines for interglacial and glacial periods. [See section 7.2. Paleo-reconstruction for more details]

The δDs of ice caps from 70 km south of Vostok Station and in East Antarctica are −453.7‰ and −448.4‰ respectively, and are shown on the map.

==== Atmosphere ====
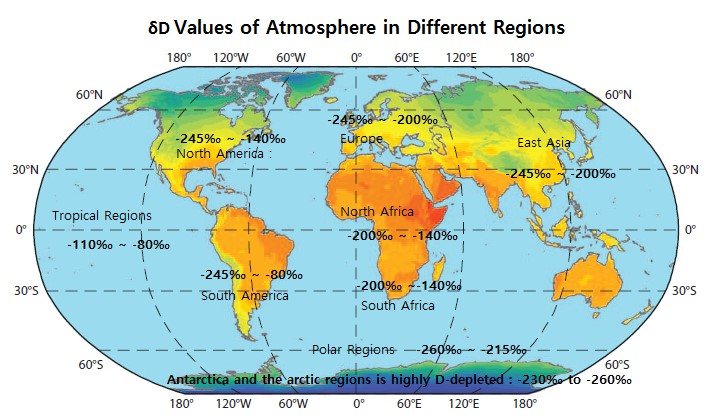

The analysis done based on satellite measurement data, estimates δD for the air in various parts of the world. The general trend is that δD is more negative at higher latitude, so air above Antarctica and the Arctic is D-depleted to around −230‰ to −260‰ or even lower.

The estimated atmospheric δDs are shown on the map.

A vast portion of global atmospheric water vapor comes from the Western Pacific near the tropics, (mean 2009) and the HIC of air depends on temperature and humidity. Hot, humid regions generally have higher δD. Water vapor in the air is in general more depleted than terrestrial water sources, since ^{1}H_{2}^{16}O evaporates faster than ^{1}H^{2}H^{16}O due to higher vapor pressure. On the other hand, rain water is in general more enriched than atmospheric water vapor.

==== Precipitation ====
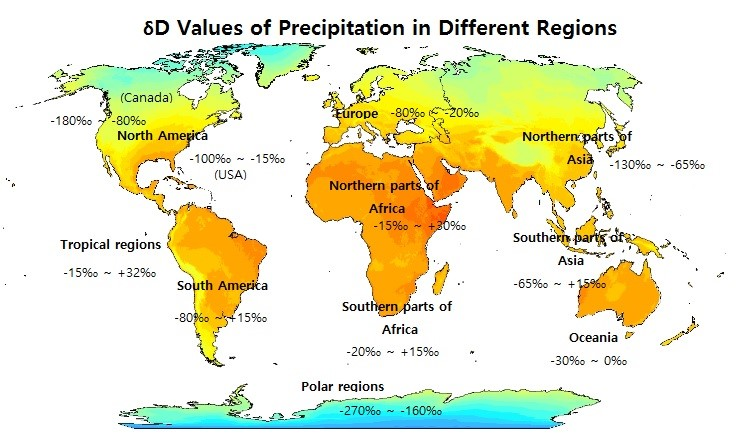

δDs of annual precipitation in different regions of the world are shown on the map. The precipitation is more D-enriched near the equator in the Tropics. The δDs generally fall in the range of around −30 ~ −150‰ in the northern hemisphere and −30~+30‰ over land areas of the southern hemisphere. In North America, the δD of average monthly precipitation across regions is lower in January (ranging up to around −300‰ in Canada) than in July (up to around −190‰).

The overall mean precipitation is determined by the balance between evaporation of water from the oceans and other surface water and condensation of water vapor in the form of rain. Net evaporation should equal net precipitation, and the δD for precipitation is around −22‰ (global average). The Global Network of Isotopes in Precipitation (GNIP) investigates and monitors the isotopic composition of precipitation at various sites all over the world. The mean precipitation can be estimated by the equation, δ^{2}H = 8.17(±0.07) δ^{18}O + 11.27(±0.65)‰ VSMOW. (Rozanski et al., 1993) This equation is the slightly modified version from the general global meteoric water line (GMWL) equation, δ^{2}H = 8.13δ^{18}O + 10.8, which provides the average relationship between δ^{2}H and δ^{18}O of natural terrestrial waters.

==== Lakes and rivers ====
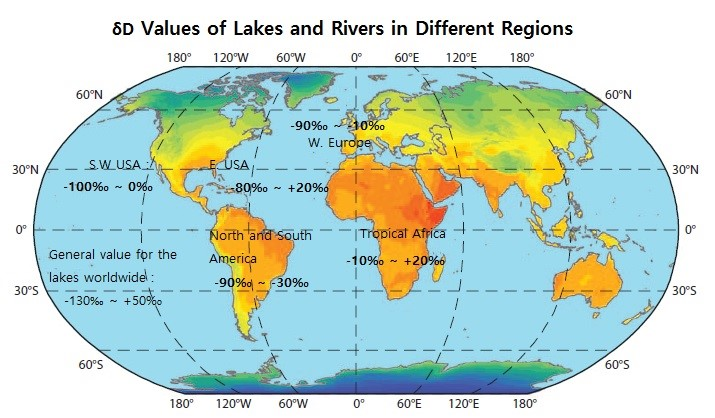

The δDs vs. VSMOW of lakes in different regions are shown on the map. The general pattern observed, indicates that δDs of surface waters including lakes and rivers, are similar to that of local precipitation.

==== Soil water ====
The isotopic composition of soil is controlled by the input of precipitation. Therefore, the δD of soil is similar to that of local precipitation. However, due to evaporation, soil tends to be more D-enriched than precipitation. The degree of enrichment varies greatly depending on atmospheric humidity, local temperature as well as the depth of the soil beneath the surface. According to the study by Meinzer et al. (1999), as the depth in the soil increases, the δD of soil water decreases.

Summary of the Hydrosphere Section
Source	δD	Reference
Surface ocean	−70‰ to −50‰	Clog et al. (2013)
Deep ocean	−10‰ to 0‰	Englebrecht and Sachs (2005)
Ice caps	−450‰ to −300‰	Lecuyer et al. (1998), Masson-Delmotte et al. (2008)
Atmosphere	−260‰ to −80‰	Frankenberg et al. (2009)
Precipitation	−270‰ to +30‰	waterisotopes.org
Lakes	−130‰ to +50‰	Sachse et al. (2012)
Soil water	−270‰ to +30‰	waterisotopes.org

=== Biosphere ===
==== Marine algae ====
The factors affecting δD of algal lipids are: δD of water, algal species (up to 160%), lipid type (up to 170%), salinity (+0.9±0.2% per PSU), growth rate (0 ~ −30% per day) and temperature (−2 ~ −8% per °C).

In a study by Zhang et al. (2009), the δDs of fatty acids in Thalassiosira pseudonana chemostat cultures were −197.3‰, −211.2‰ and −208.0‰ for C14, C16 and C18 fatty acids respectively. The δD of C16 fatty acid in the algae A. e. unicocca at 25°C, was determined using the empirical equation y = 0.890x − 91.730, where x is the δD of water at harvest. For another algal species, B. v. aureus, the equation was y = 0.869x − 74.651.

The degree of D/H fractionation in most algal lipids increases with increasing temperature and decreases with increasing salinity. The growth rates have different impacts on the D/H fractionation depending on the species types.

==== Phytoplankton and bacteria ====
The δD of lipids from phytoplankton is largely affected by δD of water, and there seems to be a linear correlation between those two values. The δD of most other biosynthetic products in phytoplankton or cyanobacteria are more negative than that of the surrounding water. The δD values of fatty acids in methanotrophs living in seawater lie between −50 and −170‰, and that of sterols and hopanols range between −150 and −270‰.

The HIC of photoautotrophs can be estimated using the equation,

R_{l} = X_{w}α_{l/w}R_{w} + (1 − X_{w})α_{l/s}R_{s},

where R_{l}, R_{w}, and R_{s} are the DHRs of lipids, water, and substrates, respectively. X_{w} is the mole fraction of lipid H derived from external water, whereas α_{l/w} and α_{l/s} denote the net isotopic fractionations associated with uptake and utilization of water and substrate hydrogen, respectively.

For phototrophs, R_{l} is calculated assuming that X_{w} = 1. The isotopic fractionation between lipids and methane (α_{l/m}) is 0.94 for fatty acids and 0.79 for isoprenoid lipids. The isotopic fractionation between lipids and water (α_{l/w}) is 0.95 for fatty acids and 0.85 for isoprenoid lipids. For plants and algae, the isotopic fractionation between lipids and methane (α_{l/m}) is 0.94 for fatty acids and 0.79 for isoprenoid lipids.

===== δD values for lipids in bacterial species =====
- Lipids in organisms growing on heterotrophic substrates:
  - Growing on sugar: depleted 200‰ ~ 300‰ relative to water
  - Growing on direct precursor of TCA cycle (e.g. acetate (δD = −76‰) or succinate): enriched −50‰ ~ +200‰ relative to water
  - α_{l/w}: −150‰ ~ +200‰
- Lipids in organisms growing photoautotrophically:
  - Depleted 50‰ ~ 190‰ relative to water
  - α_{l/w}: −150‰ ~ −250‰
- Lipids in organisms growing chemoautotrophically:
  - α_{l/w}: −200‰ ~ −400‰

==== Plants ====
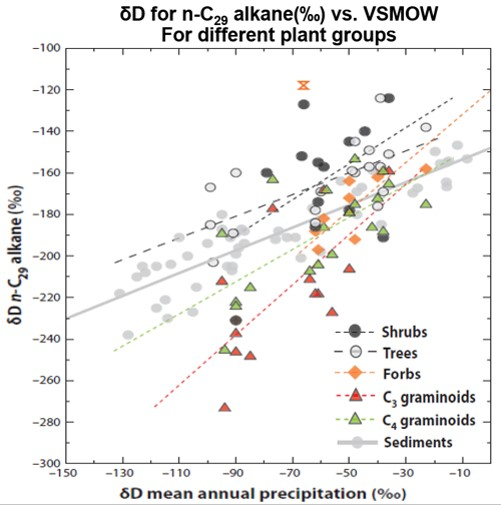
Modified from the figure in Sachse et al. (2012)

δDs for n-C_{29} alkane(‰) vs. VSMOW for different plant groups are as follows. Here, $y$ represents δDs for n-C_{29} alkane(‰) vs. VSMOW, and $x$ represents δDs for mean annual precipitation (‰) vs. VSMOW).

Plant group	Equation for estimating δD
Shrubs	$\ y = 0.867\ x - 112$
Trees	$\ y = 0.524\ x - 134$
Forbs	$\ y = 1.158\ x - 120$
C_{3} graminoids	$\ y = 1.209\ x - 129$
C_{4} graminoids	$\ y = 0.777\ x - 142$

For plant leaf wax, the relative humidity, the timing of leaf wax formation and the growth conditions including light levels affect the D/H fractionation of plant wax. From the Craig–Gordon model, it can be understood that leaf water in the growth chamber gasses is significantly D-enriched due to transpiration.

===== Sugars =====
The global abundance of ^{2}H in plants is in the following order: phenylpropanoids > carbohydrates > bulk material > hydrolyzable lipids > steroids. In plants, δDs of carbohydrates, which typically range around −70‰ to −140‰, are good indicators of the photosynthetic metabolism. Photosynthetically produced hydrogen which is bound to carbon backbones is ~100‰–170‰ more D-depleted than the water in plant tissues.

Heterotrophic processing of carbohydrates involves isomerization of triose phosphates and interconversion between fructose-6-phosphate and glucose-6-phosphate. These cellular processes promote the exchange between organic H and H_{2}O within the plant tissues leading to around 158‰ of D-enrichment of those exchanged sites. The δD of C_{3} plants such as sugar beet, orange and grape ranges from −132‰ to −117‰, and that of C_{4} plants such as sugar cane and maize ranges from −91‰ to −75‰. The δD of Crassulacean acid metabolism (CAM) such as pineapple is estimated at around −75‰. Sugar beet and sugar cane contain sucrose, and maize contain glucose. Orange and pineapple are the sources of glucose and fructose.

The deuterium content of the sugars from the above plant species are not distinctive. In C_{3} plants, hydrogen attached to carbons in 4 and 5 positions of the glucose typically comes from NADPH in the photosynthetic pathway, and is found to be more D-enriched. Whereas in C_{4} plants, hydrogen attached to carbons 1 and 6 positions is more D-enriched. D-enrichment patterns in CAM species tend to be closer to that in C_{3} species.

===== Bulk organic matter =====
The HIC of leaf water is variable during the biosynthesis, and the enrichment in the whole leaf can be described by the equation, △D_{leaf} = △D_{e} × ([1 − e^{−p}]/P)

The typical δD of bulk plant is around −160‰, while δDs for cellulose and lignin are −110‰ and −70‰ respectively.

==== Animals ====
HIC in animal tissues is hard to estimate due to complexities in the diet intake and the isotopic composition of surrounding water sources. When fish species were investigated, average HIC of proteins was in a large range of −128‰ ~ +203‰. In the bulk tissue of organisms, all lipids were found to be D-depleted, and the values of δD for lipids tend to be lower than that for proteins. The average δD for Chironomid and fish protein was estimated to be in the range of −128‰ to +203‰.

Most hydrogen in heterotrophic tissues comes from water not from diet sources, but the proportion coming from water varies. In general, hydrogen from water is transferred to NADPH and then taken up to the tissues. An apparent trophic effect (compounding effect) can be observed for δD in heterotrophs, so significant D-enrichments result from the intake of surrounding water the in aquatic food webs. The δD of proteins in animal tissues are in cases affected more by diet sources than by surrounding water.

Though different δDs for the same class of compounds may arise in different organisms growing in water with the same δD, those compounds generally have the same δD within each organism itself. [See Section 7.5. Ecology for more details]

===== Lipids =====
δDs of fatty acids in living organisms, are typically −73‰ to −237‰. The δDs of individual fatty acids vary widely between cultures (−362‰ to +331‰), but typically by less than around 30‰ between different fatty acids from the same species.

The differences in δD for the compounds within the same lipid class is generally less than 50‰, whereas the difference falls in the range of 50‰–150‰ for the compounds in different lipid classes.

δDs for typical lipid groups are determined using the following equation:

ε_{l/w} = (D/H)_{l}/(D/H)_{w}−1 = [(δD_{l} + 1)/(δD_{w} + 1)]−1; where ε_{l/w} = net or apparent fractionation, δD_{l} = lipid product and δD_{w} = source water.

- The δDs of common lipid classes found in living organisms are:
  - n-alkyl: −170‰ ± 50‰ (113‰–262‰ more D-depleted than growth water)
  - isoprenoid: −270‰ ± 75‰ (142‰–376‰ more D-depleted than growth water)
  - phytol: −360‰ ± 50‰ (more depleted than the other two categories)

Polyisoprenoid lipids are more depleted than acetogenic (n-alkyl) lipids with more negative δDs.

Summary of the Biosphere Section
Type	Source	δD	Reference
Lipid	Marine Sediment	−470‰ to −30‰	Zhang et al. (2008)
Lipid	Marine Algae	−211‰ to −197‰	Zhang et al. (2008)
Lipid	Methanotrophs	−170‰ to −50‰	Sessions (2002)
Lipid	Heterotrophs	−50‰ to +200‰ ‡	Zhang et al. (2008)
Lipid	Photoautotrophs	+50‰ to +190‰ ‡	Zhang et al. (2008)
Lipid	Plants	−270‰ to −120‰	Sachse et al. (2012)
Sugar	Carbohydrates	−140‰ to −70‰	Schmidt et al. (2003)
Sugar	C_{3} plants	−132‰ to −117‰	Schmidt et al. (2003)
Sugar	C_{4} plants	−91‰ to −75‰	Schmidt et al. (2003)
Sugar	CAM	around −75‰	Schmidt et al. (2003)
Bulk	Plants	around −160‰	Schmidt et al. (2003)
Bulk	Animals (e.g. fish)	−128‰ to +203‰	Soto et al. (2013)

‡ Enrichment relative to water

=== Geosphere ===
==== Oil ====
- Oil samples from northeast Japan: from −130‰ to around −110‰ with higher maturity.
- Oil samples from Portiguar Basin: −90‰ (lancustrine environment), −120‰ to –135‰ (marine-evaporitic environment),

==== Alkenones ====
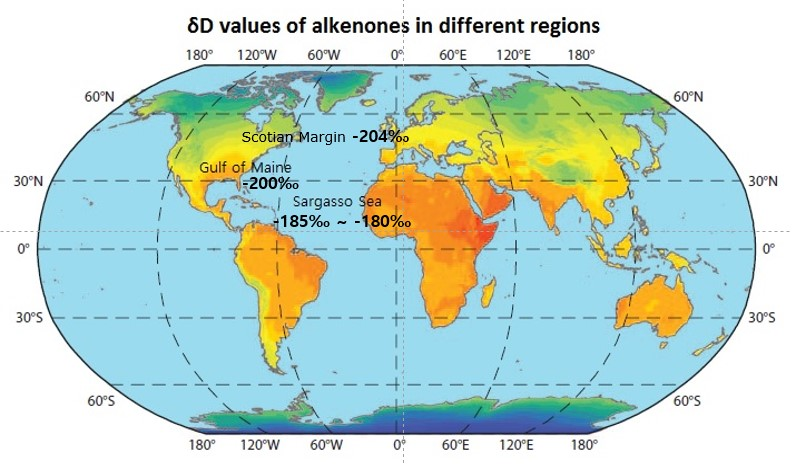

The isotopic composition of alkenones often reflect the isotopic enrichment or depletion of the surrounding environment, and δDs of alkenones in different regions are shown on the map.

==== Coals ====
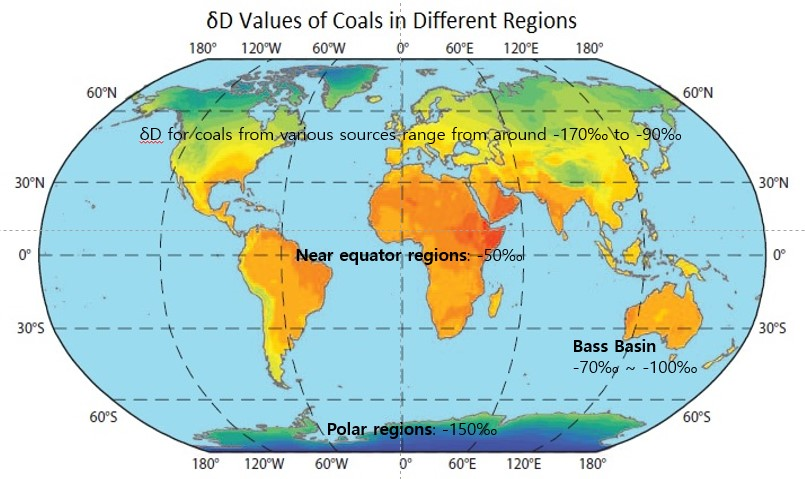

According to the studies by Reddings et al., δDs for coals from various sources range from around −90‰ to −170‰.

The δDs of coals in different regions are shown on the map.

==== Natural gas ====
===== Methane =====
Methane produced by marine methanogens is typically more D-enriched than methane produced by methanogens grown in freshwater. δDs for thermogenic methane range from −275‰ to −100‰, and from −400‰ to −150‰ for microbial methane.

==== H_{2} gas ====
The δD of atmospheric H_{2} is around +180‰, the biggest δD known for natural terrestrials (mole fraction ^{2}H: 183.8 ppm). The δD of natural gas from a Kansas well is around −836‰ (mole fraction ^{2}H: 25.5 ppm)

In electrolysis of water, hydrogen gas is produced at the cathode, but incomplete electrolysis of water may cause isotopic fractionation leading to enrichment of ^{2}H in the sample water and the production of hydrogen gas with deuterium components.

==== Mineral H ====
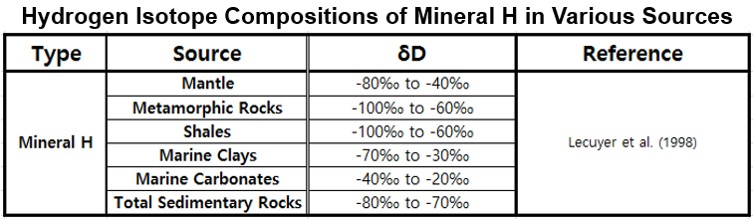

The δDs of hydroxyl-bearing minerals of the mantle were estimated at −80‰ ~ −40‰ via analysis of the isotopic composition for juvenile water. Hydrogen minerals generally have large isotope effects, and the isotopic composition often follows the pattern observed for precipitation.

===== Clay minerals =====
The D/H fractionations in clays such as kaolinite, illite, smectite are in most cases consistent when no significant external forces are applied under constant temperature and pressure.

The following is an empirically determined equation for estimating the D/H fractionation factor:

1000 In α_{kaolinite-water} = −2.2 × 10^{6} × T^{−2} − 7.7.

The δDs vs. ‰SMOW for hydrogen minerals found in mantle, metamorphic rock, shales, marine clays, marine carbonates and sedimentary rocks are shown in the table.

Summary of the Geosphere Section
Source	δD	Reference
Oil	−135‰ to −90‰	Waseda (1993), dos Santos Neto and Hayes (1999)
Alkenones	−204‰ to −181‰	Englebrecht and Sachs (2005)
Coals	−170‰ to −50‰	Redding (1980), Rigby and Smith (1981), Smith (1983)
Natural Gas (Methane)	−400‰ to −100‰	Whiticar (1999)
H_{2} Gas	−836‰ to +180‰	Hoefs (2009)
Mineral H	−100‰ to −20‰	Lecuyer et al. (1998)

=== Extraterrestrial objects ===
Variations of DHR in the Solar System

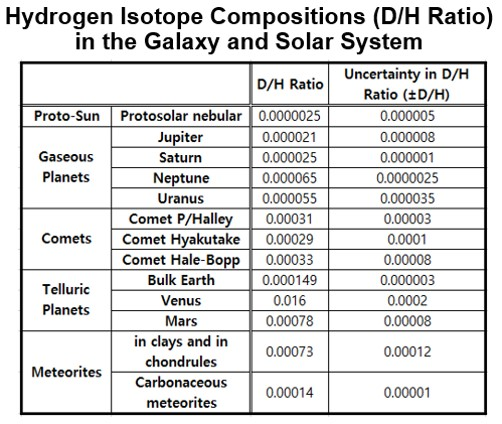

Earth
The HIC of mantle rocks on Earth is highly variable; and that of mantle water is around −80‰ ~ −50‰ depending on its states such as fluid, hydrous phase, hydroxyl point defect, juvenile water (from degassing of the mantle), magmatic water (water equilibrated with a magma).

Sun
The Sun's DHR is around 21 ± 5 × 10^{−6}.

Mars
The current HIC is enriched by a factor of 5 relative to Earth's seawater due to continual losses of H in Martian atmosphere. Therefore, the δD is estimated at around +4000‰.

The DHRs of Jupiter and Saturn are nearly in the order of 10^{−5}, and the DHRs of Uranus and Neptune are closer to 10^{−4}.

Hydrogen is the most abundant element in the universe. Variations in isotopic composition of extraterrestrial materials stem from planetary accretion or other planetary processes such as atmospheric escape, and are larger for H and N than for C and O. The preservation of D-enrichment is observed in chondritic meteorites, interplanetary dust particles and cometary Volatiles.

From the helium isotope abundance data, the cosmic DHR is estimated at around 20 ppm: much lower than the terrestrial DHR of 150 ppm. The enrichment of D/H from the proto-solar reservoir occurs for most of the planets except for Jupiter and Saturn, the massive gaseous planets. The DHRs of the atmospheres of Venus and Mars are ~2 × 10^{−2} and ~8 × 10^{−4} respectively. The DHRs of Uranus and Neptune are larger than that of protosolar reservoir by a factor of ~3 due to their deuterium-rich icy cores. The DHRs for comets are much larger than the values for the planets in the Solar System with δD of around 1000‰.

The HICs in the galaxy and the Solar System are shown in the table.

== Measurement techniques ==
DHR can be determined with a combination of different preparation techniques and instruments for different purposes. There are several types of HIC measurement: (i) organic hydrogen or water are converted to H_{2} first, followed by high-precision isotope-ratio mass spectrometry (IRMS) measurement; (ii) ^{2}H/^{1}H and ^{18}O/^{16}O are directly measured as H_{2}O by laser spectroscopy also with high precision; (iii) the intact molecules are directly measured by NMR or mass spectrometry with lower precision than IRMS.

=== Offline combustion and reduction ===
Conversion to simple molecules (i.e. H_{2} for hydrogen) is required prior to IRMS for stable isotopes. This is for several reasons with regard to hydrogen:

1. organic molecules and some inorganic ones (e.g. CO_{2} + H_{2}O) can have proton-exchange reactions with ion source of mass spectrometer and produce the products such as $\ce{H2{}^17O+}$ and $\ce{H3{}^16O+}$ that cannot be distinguished;
2. isotope effects due to ionization and transmission in the mass spectrometer can vary with different molecular forms. It would require standards in every different molecular form that is being measured, which is not convenient.

The classical offline preparation for the conversion is combustion over CuO at >800°C in sealed quartz tubes, followed by the isolation of resulting water and the reduction to H_{2} over hot metal at 400 ~1000°C on a vacuum line. The produced gas is then directly injected into the dual-inlet mass spectrometer for measurement. The metals used for reduction to H_{2} includes U, Zn, Cr, Mg and Mn, etc. U and Zn had been widely used since the 1950s until Cr was successfully employed in the late 1990s.

The offline combustion/reduction has the highest accuracy and precision for HIC measurement without limits for sample types. The analytical uncertainty is typically 1~2‰ in δD. Thus it is still used today when highest levels of precision are required. However, the offline preparation procedure is very time-consuming and complicated. It also requires a large sample (several 100 mg). Thus, online preparation based on combustion/reduction coupled with the subsequent continuous flow-IRMS (CF-IRMS) system has been more often used nowadays. Chromium reduction or high temperature conversion are the dominant online preparation methods for detection of HIC by IRMS.

=== High temperature conversion/elemental analyzer (TC/EA) ===
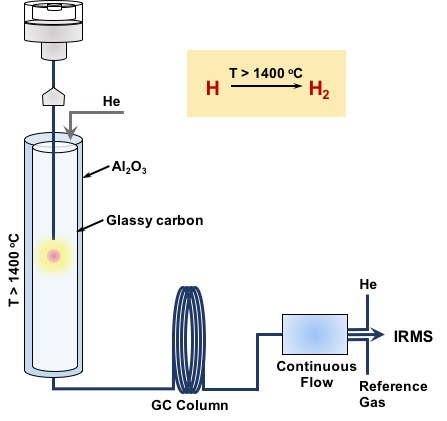
Schematic diagram of TC/EA-IRMS and the principle of hydrogen isotope detection by TC/EA

TC/EA (or HTC, high temperature conversion; HTP, high temperature pyrolysis; HTCR, high temperature carbon reduction) is an "online" or "continuous flow" preparation method typically followed by IRMS detection. This is a "bulk" technique that measures all the hydrogen in a sample and provides the average isotope signal. The weighed sample is placed in a tin or silver capsule and dropped into a pyrolysis tube of TC/EA. The tube is made of glassy carbon with glassy carbon filling, so oxygen isotopes can be measured simultaneously without oxygen exchange with ceramic (Al_{2}O_{3}) surface. The molecules are then reduced into CO and H_{2} at high temperature (>1400°C) in the reactor. The gaseous products are separated through gas chromatography (GC) using helium as the carrier gas, followed by a split-flow interface, and finally detected by IRMS. TC/EA method can be problematic for organic compounds with halogen or nitrogen due to the competition between the pyrolysis byproducts (e.g. HCl and HCN) and H_{2} formation. In addition, it is susceptible to contamination with water, so samples must be scrupulously dried.

An adaption of this method is to determine the non-exchangeable (C-H) and exchangeable hydrogen (bounds to other elements, e.g. O, S and N) in organic matter. The samples are equilibrated with water in sealed autosampler carousels at 115°C and then transferred into pyrolysis EA followed by IRMS measurement.

TC/EA method is quick with fairly high precision (~1‰). It was limited to solid samples; however, liquid sample recently can also be measured in TC/EA-IRMS system by adapting an autosampler for liquids. The drawback of TC/EA is the relatively big sample size (~ mg), which is smaller than offline combustion/reduction but larger than GC/pyrolysis. It cannot separate different compounds as GC/pyrolysis does and thus only the average for the whole sample can be provided, which is also a drawback for some research.

=== Gas chromatography/pyrolysis (GC/pyrolysis) ===
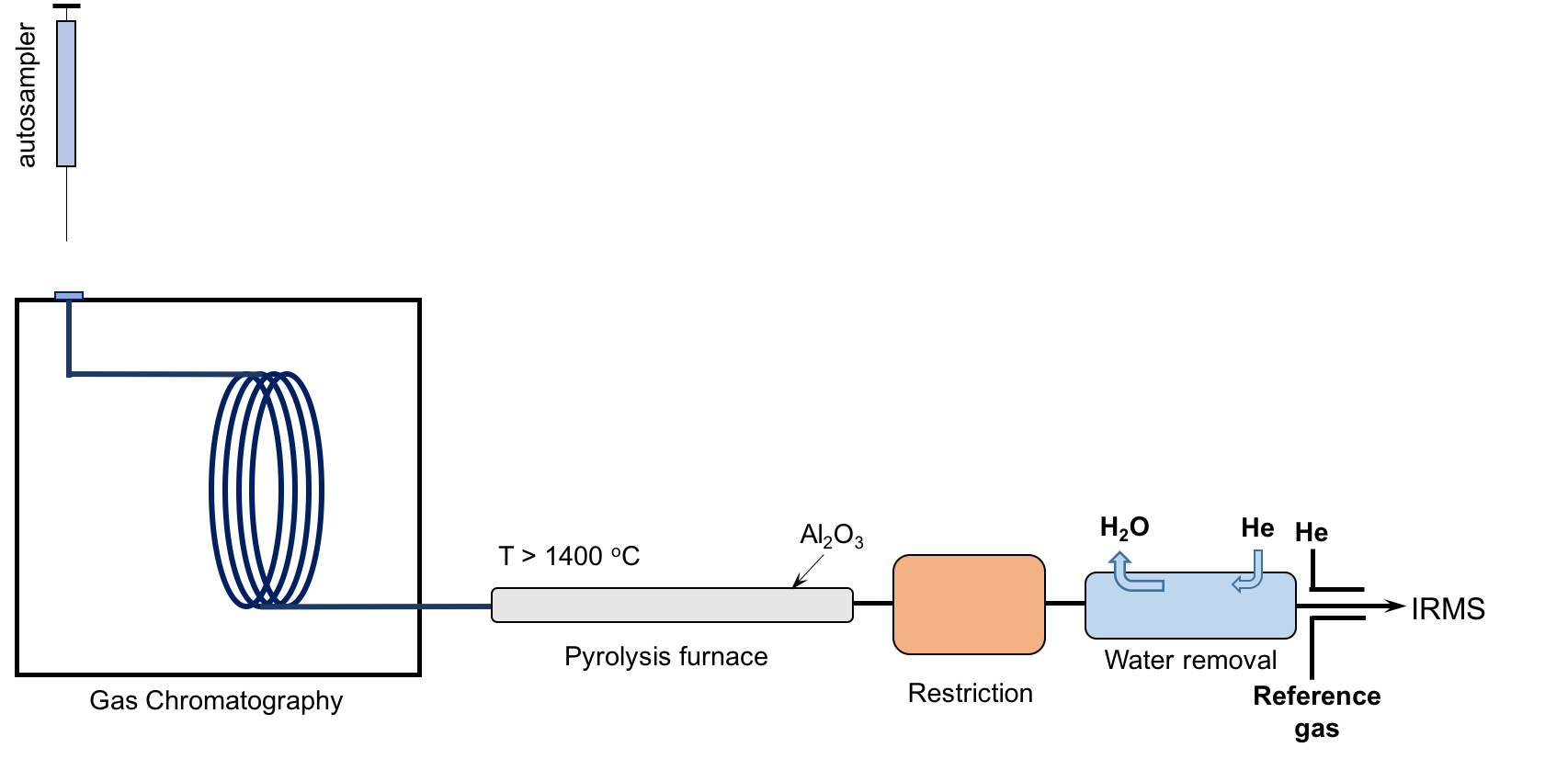
Schematic of GC/pyrolysis-IRMS

GC-interface (combustion or pyrolysis) is also an online preparation method followed by IRMS detection. This is a 'compound-specific' method, allowing separation of analytes prior to measurement and thus providing information about the isotopic composition of each individual compound. After GC separation, samples are converted to smaller gaseous molecules for isotope measurements. GC/pyrolysis uses the pyrolysis interface between GC and IRMS for the conversion of H and O in the molecules into H_{2} and CO. GC-IRMS was first introduced by Matthews and Hayes in the late 1970s, and was later used for δ^{13}C, δ^{15}N, δ^{18}O and δ^{34}S. Helium is used as the carrier gas in the GC systems. However, the separation of DH (m/z=3) signal from the tail of ^{4}He^{+} beam was problematic due to the intense signal of ^{4}He^{+}. During the early 1990s, intense efforts were made in solving the difficulties to measure δD by GC/pyrolysis-IRMS. In 1999, Hilkert et al. developed a robust method by integrating the high temperature conversion (TC) into GC-IRMS and adding a pre-cup electrostatic sector and a retardation lens in front of the m/z=3 cup collector. Several different groups were working on this at the same time. This GC/pyrolysis-IRMS based on TC has been widely used for δD measurement nowadays. The commercial products of GC-IRMS include both combustion and pyrolysis interfaces so that δ^{13}C and δD can be measured simultaneously.

The significant advantage of GC/pyrolysis method for HIC measurement is that it can separate different compounds in the samples. It requires the smallest sample size (typically ~200 ng) relative to other methods and has a high precision of 1~5 ‰. But this method is relatively slow and limited to the samples which can be applied in GC system.

=== Laser spectroscopy ===
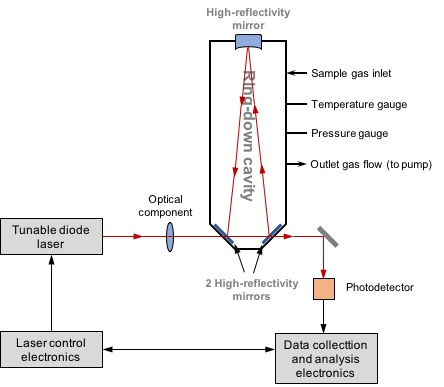
Schematic of cavity ring-down spectroscopy with three high-reflectivity mirrors (>99.995%). The laser is switched on and off rapidly and the light intensity is measured as it decays over time.

Laser spectroscopy (or cavity ring-down spectroscopy, CRDS) is able to directly measure ^{2}H/^{1}H, ^{17}O/^{16}O and ^{18}O/^{16}O isotopic composition in water or methane. The use of laser spectroscopy on hydrogen isotopes was first reported by Bergamaschi et al. in 1994. They directly measured ^{12}CH_{3}D/^{12}CH_{4} in atmospheric methane using a lead salt tunable diode laser spectroscopy. The development of CRDS was first reported by O'Keefe et al. in 1988. In 1999, Kerstel et al. successfully applied this technique to determine HIC in water. The system consists of a laser and a cavity equipped with high finesse reflectivity mirrors. Laser light is injected into the cavity, where the resonance takes place due to the constructive interference. The laser then is turned off. The decay of light intensity is measured. In the presence of a water sample, the photo-absorption by water isotopologues follows the kinetic law. The optical spectrum is obtained by recording ring-down time of the H_{2}O spectral features of interest at certain laser wavelength. The concentration of each isotopologue is proportional to the area under each measured isotopologue spectral feature.

Laser spectroscopy is quick, simple, and relatively cheap; and the equipment is portable. So it can be used in the field for measuring water samples. ^{2}H/^{1}H and ^{18}O/^{16}O can be determined simultaneously from a single injection. It requires a small sample size, < 1 μL for water. Typical precision is ~ 1‰. However, this is a compound-specific instrument, i.e. only one specific compound can be measured. And coexisting organic compounds (i.e. ethanol) could interfere with the optical light absorption features of water, resulting in cross-contamination.

=== SNIF-NMR ===
^{2}H-Site-specific Natural Isotope Fractionation-Nuclear Magnetic Resonance (^{2}H-SNIF-NMR) is a type of NMR specialized in measuring the ^{2}H concentration of organic molecules at natural abundances. The NMR spectra distinguish hydrogen atoms in different chemical environments (e.g. the order of carbon that hydrogen binds to, adjacent functional groups, and even geminal positions of methylene groups), making it a powerful tool for position-specific isotope analysis. The chemical shift (in frequency units) of ^{2}H is 6.5x lower than that of ^{1}H. Thus, it is hard to resolve ^{2}H peaks. To provide enough resolution to separate ^{2}H peaks, high-strength magnetic field instruments (~11.4T) are applied. Use of NMR to study hydrogen isotopes of natural products, was pioneered by Gerard Martin and his co-workers in the 1980s. For several decades it has been developed and expanded. The D/H NMR measurement is sometimes coupled with IR-MS measurement to create a referential standard. The sensitivity of SNIF-NMR is relatively low, typically requiring ~1 mmol of samples for each measurement. The precision with respect to isotope ratio is also poor compared to mass spectrometry. Even state-of-art instruments can only measure DHR with around 50~200‰ error depending on the compound. Therefore, so far technique can only distinguish the large D/H variations in preserved materials. In 2007, Philippe Lesot and his colleagues advanced this technique with a 2-dimensional NMR using chiral liquid crystals (CLC) instead of isotropic solvents to dissolve organic molecules. This enables the measurements of quadrupolar doublets for each nonequivalent deuterium atom. Thus reduces peak overlaps and provides more detailed information of hydrogen chemical environment.

Mainstream uses of ^{2}H-SNIF-NMR have been in source attribution, forensics and biosynthetic pathway studies. (See also Gray's section "Source attribution and Forensics") When measuring sugar compounds, a timesaving strategy is to convert them into ethanol through fermentation because ^{2}H-SNIF NMR for ethanol is well established. Several studies have proved that hydrogen isotopes on the methyl and methylene position of the resulting ethanol is not affected by either fermentation rate or media. Another example is the study of monoterpenes. since the 1980s SNIF-NMR study of α-pinene has found large variations in DHR among its sites. Particularly ex-C_{2} position has a strong depletion (~-750‰), which was in disagreement with accepted biosynthetic mechanism (mevalonate mechanism) at that time, and lead to new development in pathways. More recently, Ina Ehlers published their work on the D6^{S}/D6^{R} ratios of glucose molecules. The stereochemical diteterium distribution was found to correlate to photorespiration/photosynthesis ratios. Photorespiration/photosynthesis ratios are driven by CO_{2} fertilization, thus this might lead to new proxies in reconstructing paleo-CO_{2} concentration. Work has also been done for long-chain fatty acids and found that even-numbered sites, which are thought to be derived from C_{2} position of the acetyl group, are more enriched in ^{2}H than odd-numbered hydrogen that come from C1 position of the acetyl group. Duan et al. reported a strong KIE during the desaturation from oleic acid to linoleic acid.

In summary, the underlying physics of SNIF-NMR enables it to measure isotopomers. Another advantage of NMR measurement over mass spectrometry is that it analyzes samples non-destructively. ^{2}H SNIF-NMR has been well industrialized in source identification and forensics, and has contributed much to biochemical pathway studies. The application of ^{2}H SNIF-NMR to geological records is sporadic and still needs exploring.

=== Intact molecular isotope ratio mass spectrometry ===
Conventionally, mass spectrometry, such as gas chromatography-mass spectrometry (GC-MS) and gas chromatography -time of flight(GC-TOF), is a common technique for analyzing isotopically labeled molecules. This method involves ionizing and analyzing isotopologues of an intact organic molecule of interest rather than its products of pyrolysis or conversion. However, it does not work for natural abundance hydrogen isotopes because conventional mass spectrometers do not have enough mass-resolving power to measure the ^{13}C/D isotopologues of intact organic molecules or molecular fragments at natural abundance. For example, to resolve the single D substituted isotopologue peak of any hydrocarbons one will have to be able to at least exclude single ^{13}C substituted isotopologue peak, which sits at the same cardinal mass yet 0.0029 Da lighter and is of orders of magnitude more abundant.

Recent advances in analytical instruments enable direct measurement of natural abundance DHRs in organic molecules. The new instruments have the same framework as any conventional gas source IRMS, but incorporate new features such as larger magnetic sector, double focusing sectors, quadrupole mass filter and multi-collectors. Two commercial examples are the Nu Panorama and the Thermo Scientific 253 Ultra. These instruments generally have good sensitivity and precision. Using only tens of nanomoles of methane, the Ultra can achieve a stable high precision of ~0.1‰ error in δD. One of the first examples of this type of measurement has been clumped isotopes of methane.(See section of "natural gas" in Fossil fuels) Another strength of this kind of instruments is the ability to do site-specific isotopic ratio measurements. This technique is based on measuring DHRs of fragments from the ion source (e.g. CH_{3}CH^{+}_{2} of propane molecule) that samples hydrogen atoms from different parts of the molecule.

In summary, direct molecular mass-spectrometry has been commonly used to measure laboratory spiked isotope tracers. Recently advanced high resolution gas source isotope ratio mass spectrometers can measure hydrogen isotopes of organic molecules directly. These mass spectrometers can provide high precision and high sensitivity. The drawback of this type of instruments includes high cost, and standardization difficulty. Also, studying site-specific isotopes with mass spectrometry is less straightforward and needs more constraints than the SNIF-NMR method, and can only distinguish isotopologues but not isotopomers.

== Hydrologic cycle ==
=== Isotope fractionation in the water cycle ===
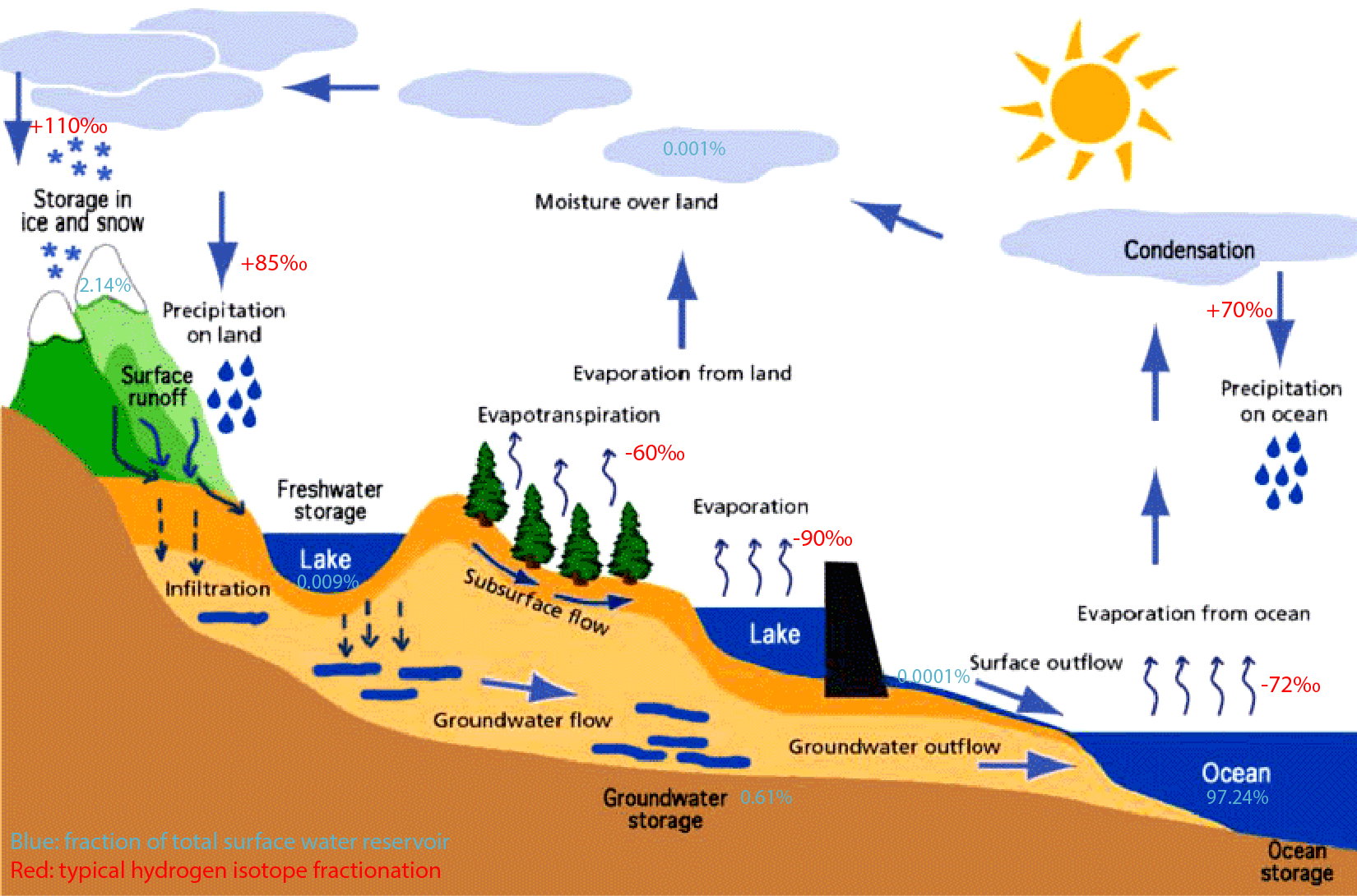
Hydrogen isotope fractionation in the water cycle (modified from water cycle diagram). Isotope fractionation is calculated as difference between product and source water in each process, at typical temperature and humidity.

Water is the main source of hydrogen for all living things, so the isotopic composition of environmental water is a first-order control on that of the biosphere. The water (hydrological) cycle moves water around Earth's surface, significantly fractionating the hydrogen isotopes in water. As the atmosphere's main moisture source, the ocean has a fairly uniform HIC across the globe around 0‰ (VSMOW). Variations of δD larger than 10‰ in the ocean are generally confined to surface water due to evaporation, sea ice formation, and addition of meteoric water by precipitation, rivers or icebergs. In the water cycle, the two main processes that fractionate hydrogen isotopes from seawater are evaporation and condensation. Oxygen isotopic composition (^{18}O/^{16}O) of water is also an important tracer in the water cycle, and cannot be separated from hydrogen isotopes when we talk about isotope fractionation processes associated with water.

When water evaporates from the ocean to the air, both equilibrium and kinetic isotope effects occur to determine the hydrogen and oxygen isotopic composition of the resulting water vapor. At the water-air interface, a stagnant boundary layer is saturated with water vapor (100% relative humidity), and the isotopic composition of water vapor in the boundary layer reflects an equilibrium fractionation with liquid water. The liquid-vapor equilibrium fractionations for hydrogen and oxygen isotopes are temperature-dependent:

$^2\varepsilon_{l-v}=52.612-76.248\times{1000 \over T(K)}+24.844\times{10^6 \over T(K)^2}$ (‰)
$^{18}\varepsilon_{l-v}=-2.0667-0.4156\times{1000 \over T(K)}+1.137\times{10^6 \over T(K)^2}$ (‰)

The amount of liquid-vapor equilibrium fractionation for hydrogen isotopes is about 8x that of oxygen isotopes at Earth surface temperatures, which reflects the relative mass differences of the two isotope systems: ^{2}H is 100% heavier than ^{1}H, ^{18}O is 12.5% heavier than ^{16}O. Above the boundary layer, there is a transition zone with relative humidity less than 100%, and there is a kinetic isotope fractionation associated with water vapor diffusion from the boundary layer to the transition zone, which is empirically related to the relative humidity (h):

$^2\varepsilon_{bl-v}=12.5(1-h)$ ‰
$^{18}\varepsilon_{bl-v}=14.2(1-h)$ ‰

The KIE associated with diffusion reflects the mass difference of the heavy-isotope water molecules H^{2}H^{16}O and H_{2}^{18}O relative to the normal isotopolog (H_{2}^{16}O).

After water evaporates to the air, condensation and precipitation transport it and return it to the surface. Water vapor condenses in ascending air masses that develop a lower temperature and saturation vapor pressure. Since the cooling and condensation happen relatively slowly, it is a process with equilibrium isotope effects. However, as water vapor is progressively condensed and lost from the air during moisture transport, the isotopic composition of the remaining vapor, as well as the resulting precipitation, can be largely depleted due to the process of Rayleigh distillation. The equation for Rayleigh distillation is:

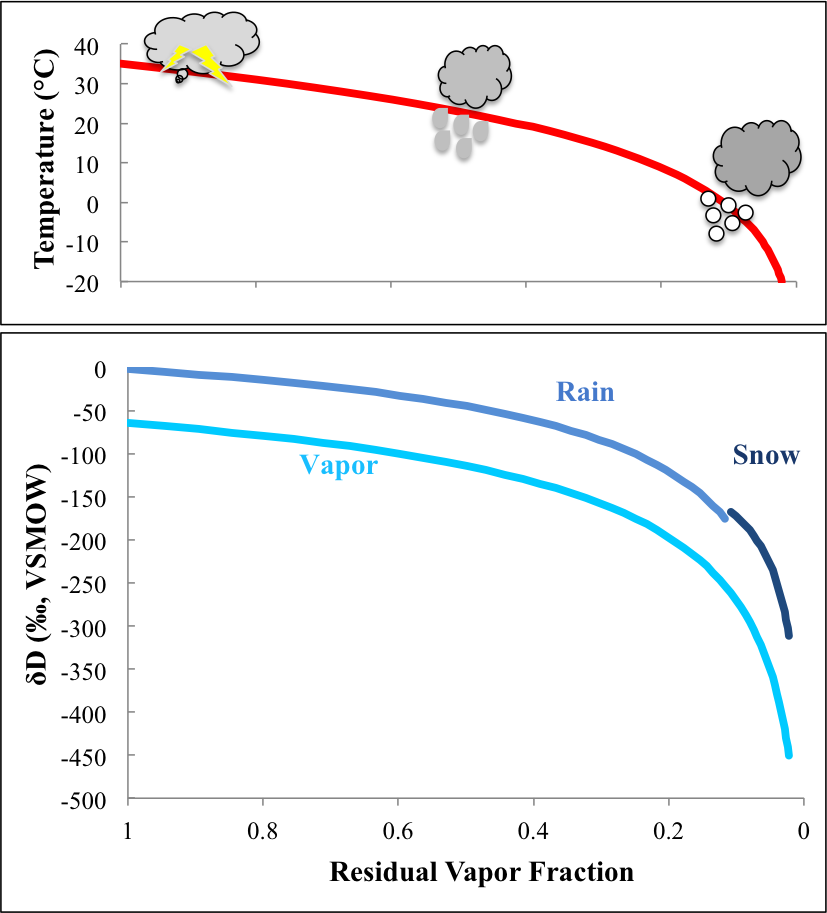
Rayleigh distillation in precipitation. As air temperature drops from the tropics to the poles, water vapor is progressively removed from the air mass by condensation, leaving the residual vapor depleted in heavy isotopes. The same process happens as air masses moves inland from oceans, or rises over a mountain range.

$R_r/R_0=f^{\alpha-1}$

where R_{0} is the isotope ratio in the initial water vapor, R_{r} is the isotope ratio in the remaining water vapor after some condensation, f is the fraction of water vapor remaining in the air, and α is the liquid-vapor equilibrium fractionation factor (α=1+ε). The isotopic composition of the resulting precipitation (R_{p}) can be derived from the composition of the remaining vapor:

$R_p/R_r=(1+\delta_p)/(1+\delta_r)=\alpha=1+\varepsilon$

As f decreases progressively during condensation, the remaining vapor becomes more and more depleted of the heavy isotopes, and the depletion becomes larger as f approaches zero. Rayleigh distillation can explain some first-order spatial patterns observed in the isotopic composition of precipitation across the globe, including isotopic depletion from the tropics to the poles, isotopic depletion from coastal to inland regions, and isotopic depletion with elevation over a mountain range, all of which are associated with progressive moisture loss during transport. The Rayleigh distillation model can also be used to explain the strong correlation between δD and δ^{18}O in global precipitation, expressed as the global meteoric water line (GMWL): δD = 8δ^{18}O+10 (later updated to δD = 8.17±0.07 δ^{18}O+11.27±0.65) The slope of the GMWL reflects the relative magnitude of hydrogen and oxygen isotope fractionation during condensation. The intercept of GMWL is non-zero (called deuterium-excess, or d-excess), which means ocean water does fall on GMWL. This is associated with the KIE during evaporation when water vapor diffuses from the saturated boundary layer to the unsaturated transition zone, and cannot be explained by the Rayleigh model. Nevertheless, the robust pattern in GMWL strongly suggests a single dominant moisture source to the global atmosphere, which is the tropical West Pacific. It should also be pointed out that a local meteoric water line can have a different slope and intercept from the GMWL, due to differences in humidity and evaporation intensity at different places. Hydrogen and oxygen isotopes in water thus serve as an excellent tracer of the hydrological cycle both globally and locally.

=== Water isotopes and climate ===
Based on the processes that fractionate isotopes in the water cycle, isotopic composition of meteoric water can be used to infer related environmental variables such as air temperature, precipitation amount, past elevations, lake levels, as well as to trace moisture sources. These studies form the field of isotope hydrology. Examples of isotope hydrology applications include:

==== Temperature reconstruction ====
Isotopic composition of precipitation can be used to infer changes in air temperature based on the Rayleigh process. Lower temperature corresponds to lower saturation vapor pressure, which leads to more condensation that drives the residual vapor toward isotope depletion. The resulting precipitation thus has a more negative δD and δ^{18}O value at lower temperature. This precipitation isotope thermometer is more sensitive at lower temperatures, and widely applied at high latitudes. For example, δD and δ^{18}O were found to have a temperature sensitivity of 8‰/°C and 0.9‰/°C in Antarctic snow, and a sensitivity of 5.6‰/°C and 0.69‰/°C across Arctic sites. δD and δ^{18}O of ice cores in Greenland, Antarctica and alpine glaciers are important archives of temperature change in the geological past.

==== Precipitation amount effect ====
In contrast to temperature control at high latitudes, the isotopic composition of precipitation in the tropics is mainly influenced by rainfall amount (negative correlation). This "amount effect" is also observed for summer precipitation in the subtropics. Willi Dansgaard, who first proposed the term "amount effect", suggested several possible reasons for the correlation: (1) As cooling and condensation progress, the rainfall isotopic composition reflects an integrated isotopic depletion by the Rayleigh process; (2) A small amount of rainfall is more likely to be influenced by evaporation and exchange with surrounding moisture, which tend to make it more isotopically enriched. At low latitudes, the amount effect for δ^{18}O is around −1.6‰/100mm precipitation increase at island stations, and −2.0‰/100mm at continental stations. It was also noted that the amount effect was most pronounced when comparing isotopic composition of monthly precipitation at different places in the tropics. The amount effect is also expected for HIC, but there are not as many calibration studies. Across southeast Asia, the δD sensitivity to monthly precipitation amount varies between −15 and −25‰/100mm depending on location. In temperate regions, the isotopic composition of precipitation is dominated by rainfall amount in summer, but more controlled by temperature in the winter. The amount effect may also be complicated by changes in regional moisture sources. Reconstructions of rainfall amount in the tropics in the geological past are mostly based on δ^{18}O of speleothems or δD of biogenic lipids, both of which are thought of as proxies for the isotopic composition of precipitation.

== Applications ==
=== Isotope hydrology ===
Hydrogen and oxygen isotopes also work as tracers for water budget in terrestrial reservoirs, including lakes, rivers, groundwater and soil water. For a lake, both the amount of water in the lake and the isotopic composition of the water are determined by a balance between inputs (precipitation, stream and ground water inflow) and outputs (evaporation, stream and ground water outflow). The isotopic composition of lake water can often be used to track evaporation, which causes isotope enrichment in the lake water, as well as a δD-δ^{18}O slope that is shallower than the meteoric water line. The isotopic composition of river water is highly variable and have complicated sources over different timescales, but can generally be treated as a two-endmember mixing problem, a base-flow endmember (mainly ground water recharge) and an overland-flow endmember (mainly storm events). The isotope data suggest that the long-term integrated base-flow endmember is more important in most rivers, even during peak flows in summer. Systematic river isotope data were collected across the world by the Global Network of Isotopes in Rivers (GNIR).The isotopic composition of groundwater can also be used to trace its sources and flow paths. An example is a groundwater isotope mapping study in Sacramento, California, which showed lateral flow of river water with a distinct isotope composition into the groundwater that developed a significant water table depression due to pumping for human use. The same study also showed an isotopic signal of agricultural water being recharged into the giant alluvial aquifer in California's Central Valley. Finally, the isotopic composition of soil water is important for the study of plants. Below the water table, the soil has a relatively constant source of water with a certain isotopic composition. Above the water table, the isotopic composition of soil water is enriched by evaporation until a maximum at the surface. The vertical profile of isotopic composition of soil water is maintained by the diffusion of both liquid and vapor water. A comparison of soil water and plant xylem water δD can be used to infer the depth at which plant roots get water from the soil.

=== Paleo-reconstruction ===
==== Ice core records ====
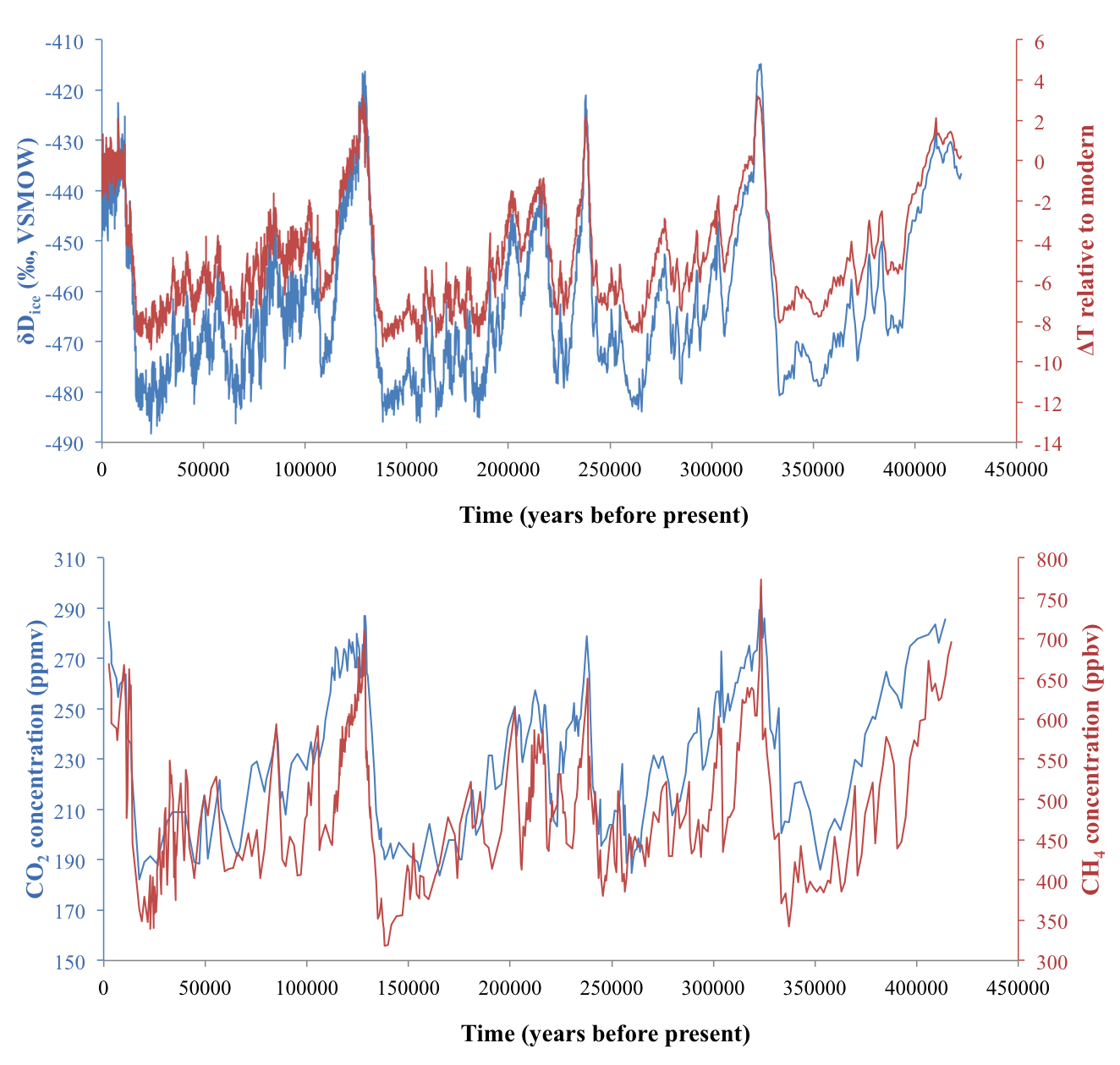
The Vostok ice core record of HIC, temperature and greenhouse gas concentrations in the last 420,000 years. Data obtained from Petit et al. (1999).

The isotopic compositions of ice cores from continental ice sheets and alpine glaciers have been developed as temperature proxies since the 1950s. Samuel Epstein was one of the first to show the applicability of this proxy by measuring oxygen isotopes in Antarctic snow, and also pointed out complications in the stable isotope-temperature correlation caused by the history of the air masses from which the snow formed. Ice cores in Greenland and Antarctica can be thousands of meters thick and record snow isotopic composition of the past few glacial-interglacial cycles. Ice cores can be dated by layer counting on the top and ice flow modeling at depth, with additional age constraints from volcanic ash. Cores from Greenland and Antarctica can be aligned in age at high-resolution by comparing globally well-mixed trace gas (e.g. CH_{4}) concentrations in the air bubbles trapped in the cores. Some of the first ice core records from Greenland and Antarctica with age estimates go back to the last 10^{5} years, and showed a depletion in δD and δ^{18}O in the last ice age. The ice core record has since been extended to the last 800,000 years in Antarctica, and at least 250,000 years in Greenland. One of the best δD-based ice core temperature records is from the Vostok ice core in Antarctica, which goes back to 420,000 years. The δD-temperature (of the inversion layer where snow forms) conversion in east Antarctica based on modern spatial gradient of δD (9‰/°C) is ΔT_{I}=(ΔδD_{ice}-8Δδ^{18}O_{sw})/9, which takes into account variations in seawater isotopic composition caused by global ice volume changes. Many local effects can influence ice δD in addition to temperature. These effects include moisture origin and transport pathways, evaporation conditions and precipitation seasonality, which can be accounted for in more complicated models. Nevertheless, the Vostok ice core record shows some very important results: (1) A consistent δD depletion of ~70‰ during the last four glacial periods compared to interglacial times, corresponding to a cooling of 8°C in Antarctica; (2) A consistent drop of atmospheric CO_{2} concentration by 100 ppmv and CH_{4} drop by ~300 ppbv during glacial times relative to interglacials, suggesting a role of greenhouse gases in regulating global climate; (3) Antarctic air temperature and greenhouse gas concentration changes precede global ice volume and Greenland air temperature changes during glacial terminations, and greenhouse gases may be an amplifier of insolation forcing during glacial-interglacial cycles. Greenland ice core isotope records, in addition to showing glacial-interglacial cycles, also shows millennial-scale climate oscillations that may reflect reorganization in ocean circulation caused by ice melt charges. There have also been ice core records generated in alpine glacials on different continents. A record from the Andes Mountains in Peru shows a temperature decrease of 5-6°C in the tropics during the last ice age. A record from the Tibetan plateau shows a similar isotope shift and cooling during the last ice age. Other existing alpine glacial isotope records include Mount Kilimanjaro in Tanzania, Mount Altai and West Belukha Plateau in Russia, Mount Logan in Canada, the Fremont Glacier in Wyoming, USA, and the Illimani Ice Core in Bolivia, most of which cover an interval of the Holocene epoch.

==== Biomolecules ====
The isotopic composition of biomolecules preserved in the sedimentary record can be used as a proxy for paleoenvironment reconstructions. Since water is the main hydrogen source for photoautotrophs, the HIC of their biomass can be related to the composition of their growth water and thereby used to gain insight into some properties of ancient environments. Studying hydrogen isotopes can be very valuable, as hydrogen is more directly related to climate than other relevant stable isotope systems. However, hydrogen atoms bonded to oxygen, nitrogen, or sulfur are exchangeable with environmental hydrogen, which makes this system less straightforward [ref to earlier H exchange section]. To study the HIC of biomolecules, it is preferable to use compounds where the hydrogen is largely bound to carbon, and thus not exchangeable on experimental timescales. By this criterion, lipids are a much better subject for hydrogen isotope studies than sugars or amino acids.

The net fractionation between source water and lipids is denoted ε_{l/w}:

$$\epsilon_{l/w} = \frac{R_l}{R_w} - 1 = \frac{\delta D_l + 1}{\delta D_w + 1} -1$$

where w refers to the water, and l refers to the lipids.

While the δD of source water is the biggest influence on the δD of lipids, discrepancies between fractionation factor values obtained from the slope and from the intercept of the regression suggest that the relationship is more complex than a two-pool fractionation. In other words, there are multiple fractionation steps that must be taken into account in understanding the isotopic composition of lipids.

===== Cellulose =====
The carbon-bonded HIC of cellulose, as inherited from leaf water, has the potential to preserve the original meteoric water signal. This was first demonstrated in the 1970s. In a systematic survey across North America, tree cellulose δD was found to have temperature sensitivity 5.8‰/°C, similar to precipitation δD sensitivity of 5.6‰/°C. This spatial correlation may be complicated by local effects of soil evaporation and leaf transpiration, and the spatial gradient may not be representative of temporal changes in tree ring cellulose at a single place. The mechanism that generates the δD signal in cellulose from meteoric water is not fully understood, but at least includes leaf water transpiration, synthesis of carbohydrates, synthesis of cellulose from photosynthetic sugars, and exchange of sugars with xylem water. Modeling studies show that observed tree ring cellulose δD can be produced when 36% of the hydrogen in sugars can exchange with xylem water, and effects such as humidity and rainfall seasonality may complicate the cellulose δD proxy. Despite these complications, tree ring δD have been used for paleoclimate reconstructions of the past few millennia. For example, a tree ring cellulose δD records from pine trees in the White Mountains, California shows a 50‰ depletion from 6800 year ago to present. The cooling trend since the mid-Holocene thermal maximum is consistent with ice core and pollen records, but the corresponding magnitude of cooling is elusive due to complicated influences from local effects such as humidity and soil water composition. The meaning of isotopes in cellulose and its applications is still an area of active study.

===== Plant leaf waxes =====
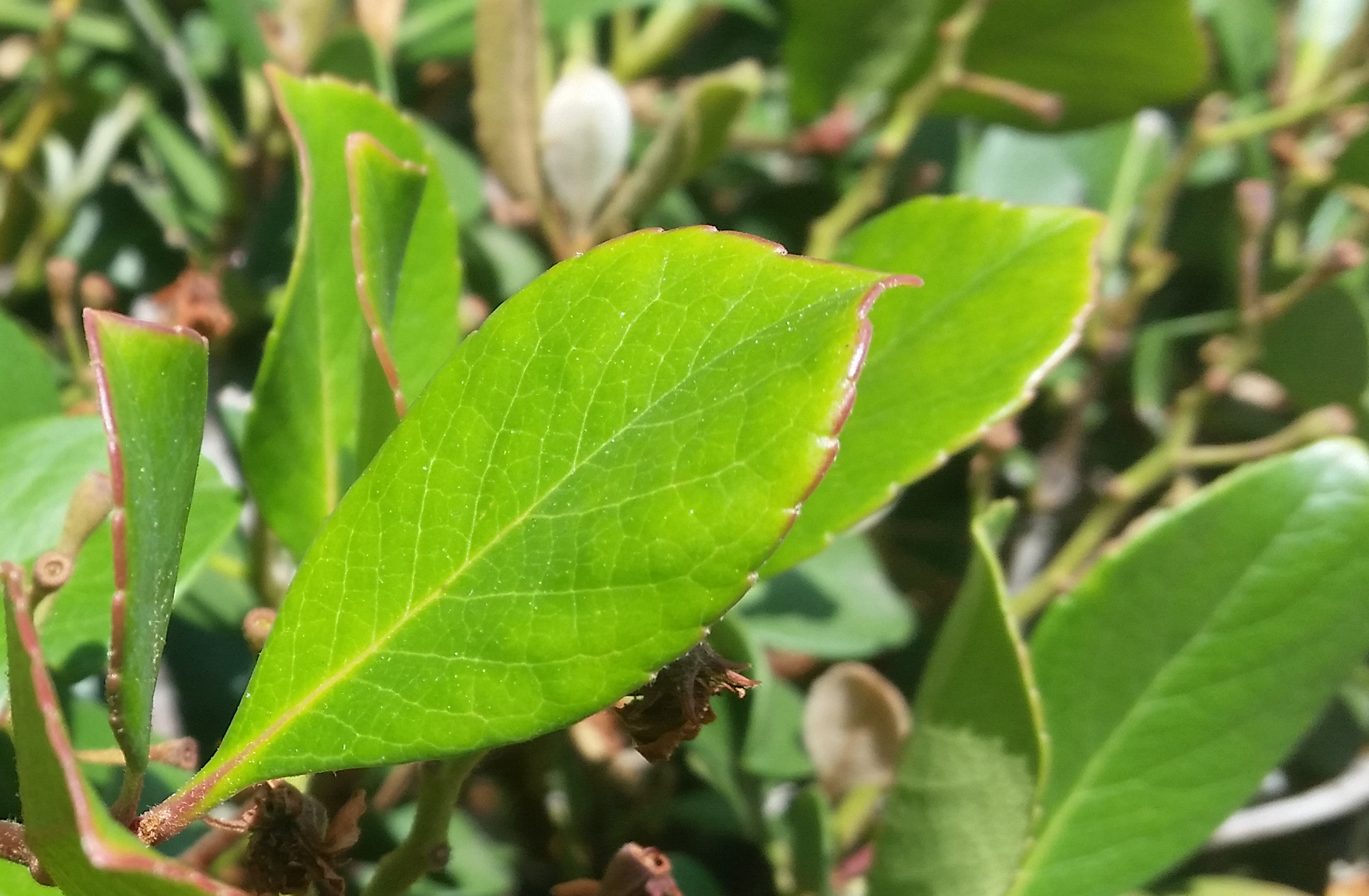
Photo of a leaf; sunlight reflects off of the waxy surface.

Terrestrial plants make leaf waxes to coat the surfaces of their leaves, to minimize water loss. These waxes are largely straight-chain n-alkyl lipids. They are insoluble, non-volatile, chemically inert, and resistant to degradation, making them easily preserved in the sedimentary record, and therefore good targets as biomarkers.

The main water source for land plants is soil water, which largely resembles the HIC of rain water, but varies between environments and with enrichment by precipitation, depletion by evaporation, and exchange with atmospheric water vapor. There can be a significant offset between the δD value of source water and the δD value of leaf water at the site of lipid biosynthesis. No fractionation is associated with water uptake by roots, a process usually driven by capillary tension, with the one exception of xerophytes that burn ATP to pump water in extremely arid environments (with a roughly 10‰ depletion). However, leaf water can be substantially enriched relative to soil water due to transpiration, an evaporative process which is influenced by temperature, humidity, and the composition of surrounding water vapor. The leaf water HIC can be described with a modified Craig-Gordon model, where ΔD_{e} is the steady state enrichment of leaf water, ε_{eq} is the temperature-dependent equilibrium fractionation between liquid water and vapor, ε_{k} is the KIE from diffusion between leaf internal air space and the atmosphere, ΔD_{v} is the leaf/air disequilibrium, e_{a} is atmospheric vapor pressure, and e_{i} is internal leaf vapor pressure.

$$\Delta D_e = \epsilon_{eq} + \epsilon_k + (\Delta D_v - \epsilon_k)(\frac{e_a}{e_i})$$

The Péclet effect, which describes the opposing forces of advection and diffusion can be added to the model as

$$P = \frac{EL}{CD}$$

where E is transpiration rate, L is length scale of transport, C is concentration of water, and D is diffusion coefficient.

$$\Delta D_\text{leaf} = \Delta D_e  \frac{(1-e^P)}P$$

While the role of rain water δD as the fundamental control on the final δD of lipids is well documented, the importance of fractionation effects from rain water to soil water and leaf water on ε_{l/w} is appreciated but remains poorly understood.

Organic biomolecules are generally depleted relative to the δD of leaf water. However, differences between organisms, biosynthetic pathways, and biological roles of different molecules can lead to huge variability in fractionation; the diversity of lipid biomarkers spans a 600‰ range of δD values. Lipid biosynthesis is biochemically complex, involving multiple enzyme-dependent steps that can lead to isotope fractionations. There are three major pathways of lipid biosynthesis, known as the mevalonate pathway, the acetogenic pathway, and the 1-deoxyD-xylulose-5-phosphate/2-methylerythroyl-4-phosphate pathway. The acetogenic pathway is responsible for the production of n-alkyl lipids like leaf waxes, and is associated with a smaller δD depletion relative to source water than the other two lipid biosynthesis pathways. While leaf water is the main source of hydrogen in leaf biomolecules, relatively depleted hydrogen from acetate or NADPH is often added during biosynthesis, and contributes to the HIC of the final molecule. Secondary hydrogen exchange reactions, meaning hydrogenation and dehydrogenation reactions outside of the primary biosynthetic pathway, also contribute substantially to the variability of lipid HIC.

Biological differences in fractionation stem not only from biochemical differences between different molecules, but also from physiological differences between different organisms. For example, the δDs of multiple leaf wax molecules are enriched in shrubs (median ~ −90‰) relative to trees (median ~ −135‰), which themselves are enriched relative to both C_{3} (median ~ −160‰) and C_{4} grasses (median ~ −140‰). Between individual species, substantial variation in δD has been documented. Other physiological factors that contribute to variable leaf wax δD values include the seasonal timing of leaf development, response to external stress or environmental variability, and the presence or absence of stomata

It can be difficult to distinguish between physiological factors and environmental factors, when many physiological adaptations are directly related to environment.

Several environmental factors have been shown to contribute to leaf wax δD variability, in addition to environmental effects on the δD of source water. Humidity is known to impact lipid δD at moderate humidity levels, but not at particularly high (>80%) or low (<40%) humidity levels, and a broad trend of enriched δDs, meaning smaller ε_{l/w}, is seen in arid regions. Temperature and sunlight intensity, both correlated to latitude, have strong effects on the rates of metabolism and transpiration, and by extension on ε_{l/w}. Also, the average chain length of leaf wax molecules varies with geographic latitude, and ε_{l/w} has been shown to increase with increasing chain length.

When using biomarkers as a proxy for reconstructing ancient environments, it is important to be aware of the biases inherent in the sedimentary record. Leaf matter incorporated into sediment is largely deposited in the autumn, so seasonal variations in leaf waxes must be considered accordingly. Furthermore, sediments average leaf waxes over lots of different plants in both space and time, making it difficult to calibrate the biological constraints on ε_{l/w}. Finally, preservation of biomolecules in the geologic record does not faithfully represent whole ecosystems, and there is always the threat of hydrogen exchange, particularly if the sediments are subjected to high temperatures.

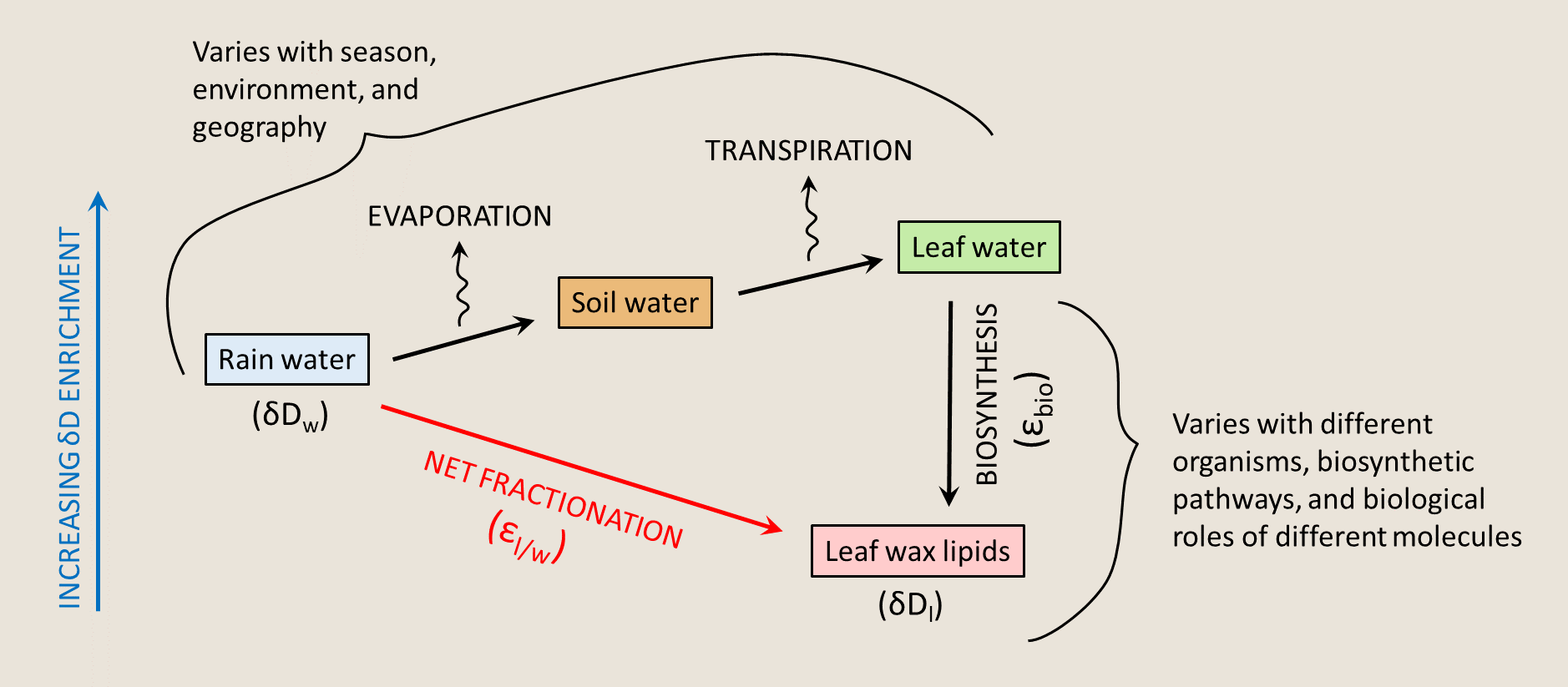
The hydrogen isotope relationships between rain water and leaf wax lipids. Adapted from Sachse et al., 2012.

The HIC of leaf waxes can be summarized as the δD of rain water, with three main fractionation steps: evaporation from soil water, transpiration from leaf water, and lipid biosynthesis, which can be combined and measured as the net fractionation, ε_{l/w}. With ever-improving measurement techniques for single molecules, and correlation with other independent proxies in the geological record that can help constrain some variables, investigating the HIC of leaf waxes can be extremely productive. Leaf wax δD data has been successfully applied to improving our understanding of climate driven changes in terrestrial hydrology, by showing that ocean circulation and surface temperature have a significant effect on continental precipitation. Leaf wax δD values have also been used as records of paleoaltimetry to reconstruct the elevation gradients in ancient mountain ranges based on the effect of altitude on rain water δD.

===== Alkenones =====
Another group of molecules often used in paleoreconstructions are alkenones, long-chain largely unsaturated lipids produced exclusively by coccolithophores. Coccolithophores are marine haptophyte algae, and include the globally iconic species Emiliania huxleyi, one of the main CaCO_{3} producers in the ocean. The δDs of alkenones are highly correlated to the δDs of seawater, and so can be used to reconstruct paleoenvironmental properties that constrain the isotopic composition of sea water. The most notable reconstruction that alkenone δD values are applied to is the salinity of ancient oceans.

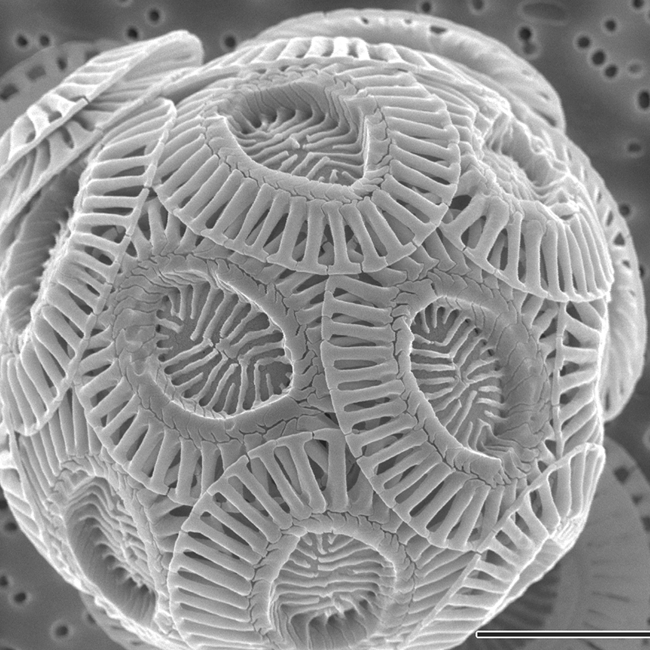
Scanning electron micrograph of a single Emiliana huxleyi cell.

Both the δDs of sea water and the fractionations associated with hyptophyte biochemistry (ε_{bio}) are fairly well understood, so alkenones can be readily used to observe the secondary effect of salinity on δD. There is a well established positive linear correlation between salinity and ε_{l/w}, on the order of a ~3‰ change in fractionation per salinity unit. Hypothesized mechanisms for this effect include enrichment of D in intracellular water due to reduced exchange with extracellular water at higher salinity, removal of H from intracellular water due to increased production of solutes to maintain osmotic pressure at higher salinity, and lower haptophyte growth rates at higher salinity

Alkenone δDs have been used successfully to reconstruct past salinity changes in the Mediterranean Sea, Black Sea, Panama Basin, and Mozambique Channel. As an extension of salinity, this data was also used to draw further conclusions about ancient environments, such as ancient freshwater flooding events, and the evolution of plankton in response to environmental changes

==== Stable isotope paleoaltimetry ====
The possibility of using water isotope depletion with elevation to reconstruct paleoaltimetry was demonstrated as early as the late 1960s, when Caltech geochemist Samuel Epstein tried to collect rainwater at different elevations in a single storm. The δ^{18}O and δD lapse rates vary within -1 to -5‰/km and -10 to -40‰/km respectively, but can vary with locations and seasons, and are not exactly linear with altitude. One of the first studies in stable isotope paleoaltimetry demonstrated a meteoric water δD signature of -90 to -139‰ in fluid inclusions in quartz and adularia in an epithermal gold-silver deposit in Nevada, and suggested the applicability of stable isotopes in reconstruction of ancient topography in the Great Basin. The hydrogen and oxygen isotopes of hydrous silicate minerals have since then been used to reconstruct topographic histories in mountain ranges across the world, including the North American Cordillera, the Rocky Mountains, the Himalayas, the European Alps, and Southern Alps in New Zealand. Lab experiments with clay minerals have shown that the hydrogen and oxygen isotope compositions are relatively resistant to alteration at moderate temperature (<100°C), and can preserve the original meteoric water signal. One important effect of mountain ranges on rainfall stable isotopes is the rain shadow effect, in which an isotopic depletion happens in precipitation on the leeward side compared to the windward side. A change in the difference in isotopic composition of precipitation on the two sides of a mountain can be used to infer the magnitude of the rain shadow effect. In one such study, an isotope enrichment was observed in smectite on the east side of the Sierra Nevada in California from mid-Miocene to late Pliocene, suggesting a decrease in elevation during this period. Another study found δDs around −140‰ in muscovite in the North America Cordillera during the early Eocene, which would suggest an elevation 1km higher than today at the time. In addition to hydrous minerals, hydrogen isotopes in biomarkers such as leaf waxes have also been developed for paleoaltimetry studies. The δD lapse rate in leaf waxes (−21‰/km) falls in the range of meteoric water observations. As an example study, leaf wax δD data has been used to confirm hydrous mineral paleoaltimetry for the high elevation of the Sierra Nevada during the Eocene.

=== Fossil fuels ===
The HIC of oil, gas and coal is an important geochemical tool to study the formation, storage, migration and many other processes. The HIC signal of fossil fuels results from both inheritance of source material and water as well as fractionations during hydrocarbon generation and subsequent alteration by processes such as isotopic exchange or biodegradation. When interpreting HIC data of sedimentary organic matter one must take all the processes that might have an isotope effect into consideration.

Almost all the organic hydrogen is exchangeable to some extent. Isotopic exchange of organic hydrogen will reorder the distribution of deuterium and often incorporate external hydrogen. Generally, more mature materials are more heavily exchanged. With effective exchange, aliphatic hydrogen can finally reach isotopic equilibrium at the final stage. Equilibrium fractionation factor varies between hydrogen sites. For example, aliphatic hydrogen isotope fractionation depends on the carbon atom that the hydrogen atom bonds with. To first order, alkyl HIC follows this trend: δD_{Primary carbon} < δD_{Secondary carbon} < δD_{Tertiary carbon}. The fractionation factors between carbon sites also decrease with increasing temperature. This can be potentially used as a thermo-history indicator. The fractionation between whole molecule and water can be estimated by averaging all hydrogen-positions, and this leads to a relatively small variation of equilibrium fractionation between different groups of hydrocarbons and water. A theoretical prediction estimated this to be −80‰ to −95‰ for steranes, −90‰ to −95‰ for hopanes, and −70‰ to −95‰ for typical cycloparaffins at 0−100°C. At the temperature of the oil window and gas window, the equilibrium fractionation between different group of organic molecules is relatively small, as compared with large primary signals.

The study of hydrogen isotopes of fossil fuels has been applied as proxies and tools in the following aspects:

1. Reconstruction of paleoenvironments of the sources. Because of the high-sensitivity of D content of terrestrial water to hydrological cycles, organic δD can reflect the environment of source formation. To the first order, DHRs of coals and n-alkanes from oils have been shown to correlate with paleolatitude.
2. Source correlation. Marine and lacustrine environments are characterized by distinctly different δD values. Many studies have tried to relate measured δD with source types. For methane, D concentration and clumped isotopes is particularly diagnostic of sources.
3. Possible maturity indicators. For example, isoprenoids synthesized by plants are strongly depleted in D (See "Observed variations in isotopic abundance" section), typically ~100‰ to n-alkyl lipids. This gap tends to decrease as rock matures because of the higher D/H exchange rates of isoprenoids. The correlation of δD difference between pristane, phytane and n-alkanes and other maturity indicators has been established across a wide maturity range. Another possible maturity indicator based on the "isotope slope" of δD vs. n-alkane chain length was proposed by Tang et al.
4. Quantitative apportionment. Since alkanes are main components of oil and gas, the isotopic data of n-alkanes have been used to study their migration and mixing. The advantage of hydrogen isotopes over carbon is higher resolution because of larger fractionation. Studying the clumped isotopes of methane provides a new dimension of mixing-constraints. The mixing line in the clumped isotope notation space is a curve rather than a straight line.
5. Fingerprinting pollutant/oil spills.

==== Kerogens and coals ====
The first stage that sedimentary organic matter (SOM) experiences after deposition is diagenesis. During diagenesis, biological decomposition can alter the DHR of organics. Several experimental studies have shown that some biodegraded materials become slightly enriched in D (less than 50‰). Most organics become kerogen by the end of diagenesis. Generally, δD of kerogen spans a wide range. Many factors contribute to the kerogen we observe in geologic records, including:

1. Source water hydrogen isotope patterns: For example, lake systems are more sensitive to hydrologic cycles than marine environments.
2. Differential fractionation for various organisms and metabolic pathways: differences in organic composition can also reflect in primary signal.
3. Isotopic exchange, H loss and H addition: This can involve mixing water-derived D with the primary signal.
4. Generation of bitumen, oil and gas: There's a fractionation between the product and kerogen.

Research on the Australian basins showed that δD of lacustrine algal sourced kerogen with terrestrial contributions varies from −105‰ to −200‰, and δD of kerogen from near-coastal depositional environment has a narrower range, −75‰ to −120‰. The smaller span in DHRs of coastal kerogen is thought to reflect the relatively stable regional climate. Pedentchouk and his colleagues reported δD values of -70‰ to -120‰ in immature to low mature kerogen from early Cretaceous lacustrine sediments in West Africa.

Coals are from type III kerogen mostly derived from land plants, which should have a primary D/H signal sensitive to local meteoric water. Reddings et al. analyzed coals of various origins and found them randomly scattered across the range of −90‰ to −170‰. Rigby et al. found D contents decrease from −70‰ to −100‰ with increasing maturity in coal from Bass Basin and attributed this to latter exchange with low D water. Smith et al. studied H isotopes of coal samples from Antarctica and Australia. They found a strong negative correlation between δD and inferred paleolatitude. For coal samples originating near the Equator, δD is around −50‰, while for those originating from polar regions, δD is around −150‰. This δD trend along latitude is consistent meteoric water trend and thus is an evidence that coals can preserve much of the original signals.

There are two types of approach to study the alteration of DHRs of kerogen during catagenesis: (1) laboratory incubation of organic matter that enables mechanistic study with controlled experiments; (2) natural sample measurement that provides information of combined effects over geologic timescales. The complex composition and chemistry of kerogen complicates the results. Nevertheless, most research on HIC of kerogen show D enrichment with increasing maturity. Type II kerogen (marine derived) from New Albany Shale is reported to have δD rise from −120‰ to −70‰ as vitrinite reflectance increase from 0.3% to 1.5%. Two main mechanisms have been proposed for enrichment. One of them is kinetic fractionation during hydrocarbon generation while the other is isotopic exchange with surrounding water. Anhydrous incubation experiments have shown that the products are generally more D-depleted than their precursors, causing enrichment in residual kerogen. Schimmelmann et al. studied the relationship between terrestrially derived oil and their source rock kerogens from four Australian Basins. They found that on average the oil is depleted to corresponding kerogen by 23‰. Hydrous incubation experiments suggest that 36–79% of bulk organic hydrogen may come from water at moderate maturity. While still under debate, it appears likely that incorporation of water hydrogen isotopes is the more dominant process for kerogen D- enrichment during catagenesis.

In summary, D content of kerogen and coal is complicated and hard to resolve due to the complex chemistry. Nevertheless, studies have found the possible correlation between coal δD and paleo-latitude.

==== Natural gas ====
Commonly, HIC of natural gas from the same well has a trend of δD_{methane} < δD_{ethane} < δD_{propane} < δD_{C4+}. This is because most natural gas is thought to be generated by stepwise thermal cracking that is mostly irreversible and thus governed by normal kinetic isotope effects (KIE) that favor light isotopes. The same trend, known as "the normal order", holds for carbon isotopes in natural gas. For example, Angola gas reportedly has a methane δD range of −190‰ to −140‰, an ethane δD of −146‰ to −107‰, a propane δD of −116‰ to −90‰, and a butane δD of −118‰ to −85‰. However, some recent studies show that opposite patterns could also exist, meaning δD_{methane} > δD_{ethane} > δD_{propane}. This phenomenon is often called 'isotopic reversal' or 'isotopic rollover'. The isotopic order could also be partly reversed, like δD_{methane} > δD_{ethane} < δD_{propane} or δD_{methane} < δD_{ethane} > δD_{propane}. Burruss et al. found that in the deepest samples of northern Appalachian basin the hydrogen isotopic order for methane and ethane is reversed. Liu et al., also found partial reversal in oil-related gas from the Tarim Basin. The mechanism causing this reversal is still unknown. Possible explanations include mixing between gases of different maturities and sources, oxidation of methane, etc. Jon Telling et al., synthesized isotopically reversed (in both C and H) low-molecular alkanes using gas-phase radical recombination reactions in electrical discharge experiments, providing another possible mechanism.

Methane is the main component of natural gas. Geosphere methane is intriguing for the large input of microbial methanogenesis. This process exhibits a strong KIE, resulting in greater D-depletion in methane relative to other hydrocarbons. δD ranges from −275‰ to −100‰ in thermogenic methane, and from −400‰ to −150‰ in microbial methane. Also, methane formed by marine methanogens is generally enriched in D relative to methane from freshwater methanogens. δD of methane has been plotted together with other geochemical tools (like δ^{13}C, gas wetness) to categorize and identify natural gas. A δD-δ^{13}C diagram (sometimes called CD diagram, Whiticar diagram, or Schoell diagram) is widely used to place methane in one of the three distinct groups: thermogenic methane that is higher in both δ^{13}C and δD; marine microbial methane that is more depleted in ^{13}C and freshwater microbial methane that is more depleted in D. Hydrogenotrophic methanogenesis produces less D-depleted methane relative to acetoclastic methanogenesis. The location where the organism lives and substrate concentration also affect isotopic composition: rumen methanogenesis, which occurs in a more closed system and with higher partial pressures of hydrogen, exhibits a greater fractionation (−300 to −400‰) than wetland methanogenesis (−250 to −170‰).

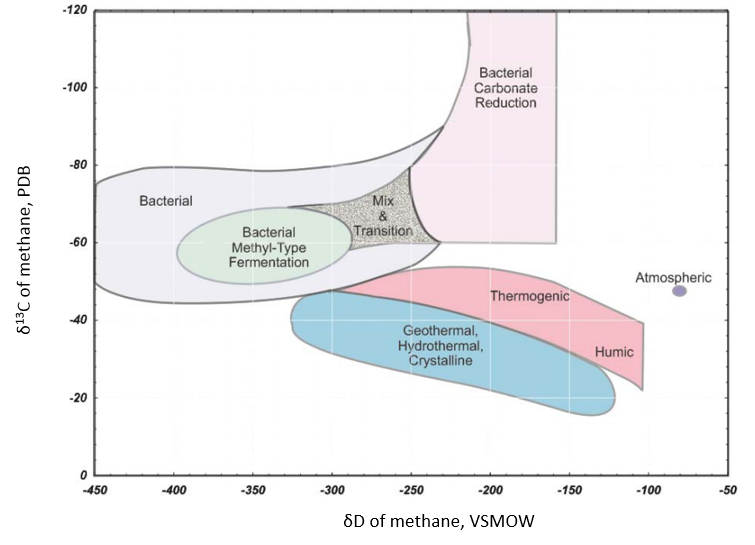
This is the δD-δ13C diagram that is well known for categorizing and identifying methane isotopes based on carbon isotopes and hydrogen isotopes. Redrawn from Whiticar, 1999

Recent advances in analytical chemistry have enabled high-precision measurements of multiply substituted (or 'clumped') isotopologues like ^{13}CH_{3}^{2}H. This is a novel tool for studying methane formation. This proxy is based on the abundance of clumped isotopologues of methane, which should be enriched compared to the stochastic distribution at thermodynamic equilibrium because the reduced zero-point energy for heavy-heavy isotope bonding is more than twice the reduced zero-point energy of heavy-light isotope bonding. The extent of enrichment decreases with increasing temperature, as higher entropy tends to randomize isotope distribution. Stolper et al. established this temperature calibration using laboratory equilibrated methane and field methane from known formation temperature, and applied this to several gas reservoirs to study natural gas formation and mixing. Wang et al. also reported strong non-equilibrium isotope effect in methane clumped isotopes from lab-cultured methanogens and field samples. These methane samples have relatively low abundance of clumped isotopologues, sometimes even lower than the stochastic distribution. This indicates that there are irreversible steps in enzymatic reactions during methanogenesis that fractionation against clumped isotopologues to create the depleted signal. Isotope clumping in methane has proven a robust proxy, and scientists are now moving towards higher-order alkane molecules like ethane for further work.

==== Oil ====
Oil is generally a product of thermal breakdown of type I and type II kerogen during catagenesis. The HIC should reflect the source kerogen signal, generation fractionation, isotopic exchange and other maturation effects. Thermal maturation at the oil window can erase much of the HIC primary signals. The formation of oil involves breaking C-C and C-H bonds, resulting in depletion of ^{13}C and ^{2}H in the products and enrichment in the residual reactants due to KIEs. Yongchun Tang and his colleagues modeled this process based on laboratory-calibrated kinetics data and found that the frequency factor ratio for D/H is 1.07. Moreover, oil is also affected by isotope fractionation from phase changes. However, the behavior of oil gas-liquid fractionation differs from water as the vapor phase of oil is ^{2}H-enriched. This depletes residual oil as it gets evaporated. Biodegradation of oil is also expected to fractionate hydrogen isotopes, as enzymatic breaking of C-H bond has a normal KIE. Several degradation experiments show that this fractionation is generally mild, ranging from −11‰ to −79‰. This process should also enrich partially degraded oil. Finally, oil stored in a reservoir often had migrated through subsurface (aka geochromatography) from another source region, interacting with water. No data has been published to confirm the fractionation associated with migration, yet theoretical prediction shows that this is likely to be very small.

Many studies of natural samples have shown slight increases in δD with thermal maturity. Amane Waseda reported δD of oil samples in northeast Japan to increase from around −130‰ to around −110‰ with higher maturity. At low thermal maturity, dos Santos Neto and Hayes reported δD of saturate fraction of oil in Portiguar Basin derived from a lacustrine environment is -90‰, and from a marine-evaporitic environment is -120‰ to −135‰.

Bulk analysis of oil, which yields a complex mixture of organic compounds, obscures much of the valuable information. Switching to compound-specific study greatly expanded our understanding of hydrogen isotopes of oil. Analyzing HIC at the compound level avoids problems from differences in exchange rates, simplifies sources and products relationships, and draws a much more detailed picture. δDs of n-alkanes are generally thought to be representative of oil as they are the major components. Schimmelmann et al. confirmed that alkane fractions have almost the same DHRs as whole oils. Depending on source material type and maturity, δD of n-alkanes can vary from −100‰ to −180‰. A common phenomenon of various oil and matured rock derived n-alkanes is a trend of increasing δD with chain length. For example, Li et al. analyzed oils from the Western Canada Sedimentary Basin and found δD increased between 20‰ and 40‰ from C_{13} to C_{27}. This "isotope slope" is an artifact of kinetic fractionation associated with thermal cracking of carbon chains. This trend has been experimentally reproduced and theoretically modeled by Tang et al.

N-alkanes are also known to preserve detailed information of source material. Li et al. studied oils from the marine-derived Upper Cretaceous Second White Speckled Shale and found strong depleted signal around −180‰ in C_{12}-C_{18}. The low δD of this marine samples was explained by the discharge of a large high latitude river. Schimmelmann et al. found that the δD of the oil sampled from coaly facies of the Crayfish group reaches down to −230‰ where as those sampled from algal facies of the same group are around −100‰. Such huge variation is hard to explain by any other causes than Australia splitting from Antarctica in late Cretaceous. Another special case reported by Xiong et al. studied Ordovician carbonates from Bohai Bay Basin. They found big differences between δD of n-alkanes, reflecting that the original signal is preserved rather than being homogenized. The result is not obvious as the sample is very mature (inferred vitrinite reflectance R_{0} up to 2.3). Thus this is strong evidence that carbonate systems have much lower catalytic efficiency of hydrogen exchange on hydrocarbons. Strong enrichment (~40‰) in odd carbon numbered alkanes to even carbon numbered alkanes is also found in some subset of samples and the reason is unclear at this point. This odd-even effect is also observed in immature clastic sediments.

=== Ecohydrology ===
Ecohydrology is concerned with the interaction between ecosystems and water cycling, from measuring the small scale drainage of water into soil to tracking the broad movements of water evaporating from trees. Because deuterium acts as a conservative tracer, it works well for tracking water movement through plants and ecosystems. Though water movement in single-process phenomena such as evaporation is relatively simple to track, many systems (e.g. cloud forests) in the environment have multiple sources, and tracking water movement becomes more complicated. Isotope spiking can also be done to determine water transport through soil and into plants by injecting deuterated water directly into the ground.

Stable isotope analysis of xylem water can be used to follow the movement of water from soil into the plants and therefore provide a record of the depth of water acquisition. An advantage to using xylem water is that in theory, the HIC should directly reflect the input water without being affected by leaf transpiration. For example, Dawson and Ehleringer used this approach to determine whether trees that grow next to streams are using the surface waters from that stream. Water from the surface would have the same isotopic composition as the stream, while water from farther below in the ground would be from past precipitation inputs. In this case, younger trees had a xylem water isotopic composition very close to the adjacent stream and likely used surface waters to get established. Older trees had depleted xylem water relative to the stream, reflecting that they source their water from deeper underground. Other stable isotope studies have also determined that plants in redwood forests do not just take up water from their roots but acquire a significant proportion of water via stomatal uptake on leaves.

Plant water can be used to characterize other plant physiological processes that affect the water cycle; for example, leaf water is widely used for modeling transpiration and water-use efficiency (WUE). In transpiration, the Craig-Gordon model for lake water enrichment through evaporation has been found experimentally to fit well for modelling leaf water enrichment. Transpiration can be measured by direct injection of deuterated water into the base of the tree, trapping all water vapor transpired from the leaves and measuring the subsequent condensate. Water use can also be measured and is calculated from a heavy water injection as follows:

$WU=\frac{M}{\sum_{1}^{T}C_{i}\Delta t_{i}}$,

where WU is water use in kg/day, M is mass of deuterated water injected in grams, T is the final day of the experiment, C_{i} is concentration of deuterium at time interval i in grams/kilogram, and Δt_{i} is the length of time interval i in days. Though the calculated water use via thermal-dissipation-probing of some tropical plants such as bamboos, correlates strongly with measured water use found by tracking D_{2}O movement, the exact values are not the same. In fact, with the legume tree Gliricidia sepium, which produces a heartwood, transpired water did not even correlate strongly with injected ^{2}H_{2}O concentrations, which would further complicate water use measurements from direct injections. This possibly occurred because heartwoods could accumulate heavy water rather than move the water directly through xylem and to leaves.

WUE, the ratio of carbon fixation to transpiration, has previously been associated with ^{13}C/^{12}C ratios using the equation:

$\ce{WUE}=\frac{(1-\phi)p_\ce{CO2}}{1.6(\epsilon_\ce{carb}-\epsilon_\ce{diff})}(\epsilon_\ce{carb}-\Delta\ce{^{13}C})$,

where

$\ce{\Delta^{13}C\ =\ \frac{\delta^{13}C_{atm}-\delta^{13}C_{plant}}{1+\delta^{13}C_{atm}}}$, φ is fraction of fixed carbon that is respired, p_{CO_{2}} is partial pressure of CO_{2} in the atmosphere, ε_{carb} is the fractionation of carboxylation, and ε_{diff} is the fractionation of diffusion in air. The relation of δD in plant leaf waxes to δ^{13}C has been empirically measured and results in a negative correlation of δD to water use efficiency. This can be explained in part by lower water use efficiency being associated with higher transpiration rates. Transpiration exhibits a normal isotope effect, causing ^{2}H-enrichment in plant leaf water and therefore enrichment of leaf waxes.

=== Ecology ===
==== Migration patterns ====
HIC can be useful in tracking animal migration. Animals with metabolically inert tissue (e.g. feathers or hair) synthesize that tissue using hydrogen from source water and food, but ideally do not incorporate subsequent water during migration. Because δD varies geographically, the difference between animal tissue δD and post-migration water δD, after accounting for the biological fractionation of assimilation, can provide information regarding animal movement. In monarch butterflies, for example, wing chitin is metabolically inert after it is built, so it can reflect the isotopic composition of the environmental water at the time and location of wing growth. This then creates a record of butterfly origin and can be used to determine migration distance. This approach can also be used in bats and birds, using hair and feathers, respectively. Since rainwater becomes depleted as elevation increases, this method can also track altitudinal migration. However, this is technically hard to do, and the resolution seems to be too poor to track small altitudinal changes. ^{2}H is most useful in tracking movement of species between areas with large continental water variation, since species movement can be complicated by the similarity of local water δD between places. For example, source water from Baja California may have the same δD as water from Maine. Further, a proportion of the HIC in the tissue can exchange with water and complicate the interpretation of measurements. To determine this percentage of isotopic exchange, which varies according to local humidity levels, standards of metabolically inert tissue from the species of interest can be constructed and equilibriated to local conditions. This allows measured δD from different regions to be compared against each other.

==== Trophic interactions ====
Assimilation of diet into tissue has a tissue-specific fractionation known as the trophic discrimination factor. Diet sources can be tracked through a food web via deuterium isotope profiles, though this is complicated by deuterium having two potential sources – water and food. Food more strongly impacts δD than does exchange with surrounding water, and that signal is seen across trophic levels. However, different organisms derive organic hydrogen in varying ratios of water to food: for example, in quail, 20-30% of organic hydrogen was from water and the remainder from food. The precise percentage of hydrogen from water, depended on tissue source and metabolic activity. In chironomids, 31-47% of biomass hydrogen derived from water, and in microbes as much as 100% of fatty acid hydrogen can be derived from water depending on substrate. In caterpillars, diet δD from organic matter correlates linearly with tissue δD. The same relationship does not appear to hold consistently for diet δD from water, however – water derived from either the caterpillar or its prey plant is more ^{2}H-enriched than their organic material. Going up trophic levels from prey (plant) to predator (caterpillar) results in an isotopic enrichment. This same trend of enrichment is seen in many other animals - carnivores, omnivores, and herbivores - and seems to follow ^{15}N relative abundances. Carnivores at the same trophic level tend to exhibit the same level of ^{2}H enrichment. Because, as mentioned earlier, the amount of organic hydrogen produced from water varies between species, a model of trophic level related to absolute fractionation is difficult to make if the participating species are not known. Consistency in measuring the same tissues is also important, as different tissues fractionate deuterium differently. In aquatic systems, tracking trophic interactions is valuable for not only understanding the ecology of the system, but also for determining the degree of terrestrial input. The patterns of deuterium enrichment consistent within trophic levels is a useful tool for assessing the nature of these interactions in the environment.

==== Microbial metabolism ====
Biological deuterium fractionation through metabolism is very organism and pathway dependent, resulting in a wide variability in fractionations. Despite this, some trends still hold. Hydrogen isotopes tend to fractionate very strongly in autotrophs relative to heterotrophs during lipid biosynthesis - chemoautotrophs produce extremely depleted lipids, with the fractionation ranging from roughly −200 to −400‰. This has been observed both in laboratory-grown cultures fed a known quantity of deuterated water and in the environment. Proteins, however, do not follow as significant a trend, with both heterotrophs and autotrophs capable of generating large and variable fractionations. In part, kinetic fractionation of the lighter isotope during formation of reducing equivalents NADH and NADPH result in lipids and proteins that are isotopically lighter.

Salinity appears to play a role in the degree of deuterium fractionation as well; more saline waters affect growth rate, the rate of hydrogen exchange, and evaporation rate. All of these factors influence lipid δD upon hydrogen being incorporated into biomass. In coccolithophores Emiliania huxleyi and Gephyrocapsa oceanica, alkenone δD has been found to correlate strongly to organism growth rate divided by salinity. The relationship between deuterium fractionation and salinity could potentially be used in paleoenvironment reconstruction with preserved lipids in the rock record to determine, for example, ocean salinity at the time of organismal growth. However, the degree of fractionation is not necessarily consistent between organisms, complicating the determination of paleosalinity with this method. There also appears to be a negative correlation between growth rate and fractionation in these coccolithophores. Further experiments on unicellular algae Eudorina unicocca and Volvox aureus show no effect of growth rate (controlled by nitrogen limitation) on fatty acid δD. However, sterols become more D-depleted as growth rate increases, in agreement with alkenone isotopic composition in coccolithophores. Overall, although there are some strong trends with lipid δD, the specific fractionations are compound-specific. As a result, any attempt to create a salinometer through δD measurements will necessarily be specific to a single compound type.

=== Environmental chemistry ===
An important goal of environmental chemistry is tracing the source and degradation of pollutants. Various methods have been used for fingerprinting pools of environmental pollutants such as the bulk chemical composition of a spill, isotope ratios of the bulk chemical mixture, or isotope ratios of individual constituent compounds. Stable isotopes of carbon and hydrogen can be used as complementary fingerprinting techniques for natural gas. The DHR of hydrocarbons from the Deepwater Horizon oil spill was used to verify that they were likely from the Macondo well. HICs have also been used as a measure of the relative amount of biodegradation that has occurred in oil reservoirs in China, and studies on pure cultures of n-alkane degrading organisms have shown a chain-length dependence on the amount of hydrogen isotope fractionation during degradation. Additional studies have also shown hydrogen isotope effects in the degradation of methyl tert-butyl ether and toluene that have been suggested to be useful in the evaluation of the level of degradation of these polluting compounds in the environment. In both cases the residual unreacted compounds became ^{2}H-enriched to a few tens of ‰, with variations exhibited between different organisms and degree of reaction completeness. These observations of heavy residual compounds have been applied to field observations of biodegradation reactions such as removal of benzene and ethylbenzene, which imparted a D/H fractionation of 27 and 50 ‰, respectively. Also, analysis of o-xylene in a polluted site showed high residual DHRs after biodegradation, consistent with activation of C-H bonds being a rate limiting step in this process

=== Source attribution and forensics ===
Stable isotope ratios have found uses in various instances where the authenticity or origin of a chemical compound is called into question. Such situations include assessing the authenticity of food, wine and natural flavors; drug screening in sports (see doping in sport); pharmaceuticals; illicit drugs; and even helping identify human remains. In these cases it is often not enough to detect or quantify a certain compound, since the question is the origin of the compound. The strength of hydrogen isotope analysis in answering these questions is that the DHR of a natural product is often related to the natural water DHRs in the area where the product was formed (see: Hydrologic cycle). Since DHRs vary significantly between different areas, this can be a powerful tool in locating the original source of many different substance.

==== Food and flavor authentication ====
Foods, flavorings and scents are often sold with the guarantee that chemical additives come from natural sources. This claim becomes hard to test when the chemical compound has a known structure and is readily synthesized in a lab. Authentication of claims about the origins of these chemicals has made good use of various stable isotopes, including those of hydrogen. Combined carbon and hydrogen isotope analysis has been used to test the authenticity of (E)-methyl cinnamate, γ-decalactone and δ-decalactone. Hydrogen and nitrogen isotope ratios have been used for the authentication of alkylpyrazines used as "natural" coffee flavorings.

==== Doping ====
The isotope ratio of carbon in athletes' steroids has been used to determine whether these steroids came from the athlete's body or an outside source. This test has been used in a number of high-profile anti-doping cases and has various benefits over simply characterizing the concentration of various compounds. Attempts are being made to create similar tests based on stable hydrogen isotopes which could be used to complement the existing testing methods. One concern with this method was that the natural steroids produced by the human body may vary significantly based on the ^{2}H content of drinking water, leading to false detection of doping based on HIC differences. This concern has been addressed in a recent study which concluded that the effect of DHR of drinking water did not pose an insurmountable source of error for this anti-doping testing strategy.

==== Pharmaceutical copies ====
The pharmaceutical industry has revenues of hundreds of billions of dollars a year globally. With such a large industry counterfeiting and copyright infringement are serious issues, and hydrogen isotope fingerprinting has become a useful tool in verifying the authenticity of various drugs. As described in the preceding sections, the utility of DHRs is highest when combined with measurements of other isotope ratios. In an early study on the stable isotope compositions of tropicamide, hydrocortisone, quinine and tryptophan; carbon, nitrogen, oxygen and hydrogen stable isotopes were analyzed by EA-IRMS; clear distinctions were able to be made between manufacturers and even batches of the drugs based on their isotope signatures. In this study it was determined that the hydrogen and oxygen isotope ratios were the two best fingerprints for distinguishing between different drug sources. A follow-up study analyzing naproxen from various lots and manufacturers also showed similar ability to distinguish between sources of the drugs. The use of these isotope signatures could not only be used to distinguish between different manufacturers, but also between different synthetic pathways for the same compound. These studies relied on the natural variations that occurred in the synthesis of these drugs, but other studies have used starting ingredients that are intentionally labeled D and ^{13}C, and showed that these labels could be traced into the final pharmaceutical product. DHRs can also be determined for specific sites in a drug by ^{2}H NMR, and has been used to distinguish between different synthetic methods for ibuprofen and naproxen in one study, and prozac and fluoxetine in another. These studies show that bulk DHR information for EA-IRMS, and site-specific DHRs from ^{2}H NMR have great utility for pharmaceutical drug authenticity testing.

==== Illicit drugs ====
The sources and production mechanisms of illegal drugs has been another area that has seen successful application of hydrogen isotope characterization. Usually, as with other applications of stable isotope techniques, results are best when data for multiple stable isotopes are compared with one another. δ^{2}H, δ^{13}C and δ^{15}N have been used together to analyze tablets of MDA and MDMA and has successfully identified differences which could be used to differentiate between different sources or production mechanisms. The same combination of stable isotopes with the addition of δ^{18}O was applied to heroin and associated packaging and could successfully distinguish between different samples. Analysis using deuterium NMR was also able to shed light on the origin and processing of both cocaine and heroin. In the case of heroin this site-specific natural isotopic fraction measured by deuterium NMR (SNIF-NMR) method could be used for determining the geographic origin of the molecule by analyzing so-called natural sites (which were present in the morphine from which heroin is made), as well as gaining information on the synthesis process by analyzing the artificial sites (added during drug processing).

==== Provenance of human remains ====
The geographic variation in DHR in human drinking water is recorded in hair. Studies have shown a very strong relation between an individual's hair and drinking water DHRs.

Since tap water DHR depends strongly on geography, a person's hair DHR can be used to determine regions where they most likely lived during hair growth. This idea has been used in criminal investigations to try to constrain the movements of a person prior to their death, in much the same way DHRs have been used to track animal migration. By analyzing sections of hair of varying ages, one can determine in what D/H regions a person was living at a specific time before their death.

== See also ==
- Abundance of chemical elements
- Hydrogen isotope
- Natural abundance
- Stable isotopes
