= Sedimentary organic matter =

Sedimentary organic matter includes the organic carbon component of sediments (including those in aquatic environments) and sedimentary rocks. The organic matter is usually a component of sedimentary material even if it is present in low abundance (usually lower than 1%). Petroleum (or oil) and natural gas are particular examples of sedimentary organic matter (SOM). Marine sediments are one of the largest sources of SOM. Coals and bitumen shales are examples of sedimentary rocks rich in sedimentary organic matter.

The factors which affect preservation vary with the depositional regime, but include the critical interaction between organic and inorganic materials according to local variations.

== Origin ==
Organic matter is essentially synthesized from mineral carbon (CO_{2}) by autotroph organisms living at the boundaries between the geosphere, the atmosphere and the biosphere.
