= Isotope geochemistry =

Aspect of geology studying variations in isotope abundances in the natural environment

Isotope geochemistry is an aspect of geology based upon the study of natural variations in the relative abundances of isotopes of various elements. Variations in isotopic abundance are measured by isotope-ratio mass spectrometry, and can reveal information about the ages and origins of rock, air or water bodies, or processes of mixing between them.

Stable isotope geochemistry is largely concerned with isotopic variations arising from mass-dependent isotope fractionation, whereas radiogenic isotope geochemistry is concerned with the products of natural radioactivity.

== Stable isotope geochemistry ==
For most stable isotopes, the magnitude of fractionation from kinetic and equilibrium fractionation is very small; for this reason, enrichments are typically reported in "per mil" (‰, parts per thousand). These enrichments (δ) represent the ratio of heavy isotope to light isotope in the sample over the ratio of a standard. That is,

$\delta \ce{^{13}C} = \left( \frac{\left( \frac{\ce{^{13}C}}{\ce{^{12}C}} \right)_{sample}}{\left( \frac{\ce{^{13}C}}{\ce{^{12}C}}\right)_{standard}} -1 \right) \times 1000$ ‰

=== Carbon ===
Carbon has two stable isotopes, ^{12}C and ^{13}C, and one radioactive isotope, ^{14}C.

The stable carbon isotope ratio, δ^{13}C, is measured against Vienna Pee Dee Belemnite (VPDB). The stable carbon isotopes are fractionated primarily by photosynthesis (Faure, 2004). The ^{13}C/^{12}C ratio is also an indicator of paleoclimate: a change in the ratio in the remains of plants indicates a change in the amount of photosynthetic activity, and thus in how favorable the environment was for the plants. During photosynthesis, organisms using the C_{3} pathway show different enrichments compared to those using the C_{4} pathway, allowing scientists not only to distinguish organic matter from abiotic carbon, but also what type of photosynthetic pathway the organic matter was using. Occasional spikes in the global ^{13}C/^{12}C ratio have also been useful as stratigraphic markers for chemostratigraphy, especially during the Paleozoic.

The ^{14}C ratio has been used to track ocean circulation, among other things.

=== Nitrogen ===
Nitrogen has two stable isotopes, ^{14}N and ^{15}N. The ratio between these is measured relative to nitrogen in ambient air. Nitrogen ratios are frequently linked to agricultural activities. Nitrogen isotope data has also been used to measure the amount of exchange of air between the stratosphere and troposphere using data from the greenhouse gas N_{2}O.

=== Oxygen ===
Oxygen has three stable isotopes, ^{16}O, ^{17}O, and ^{18}O. Oxygen ratios are measured relative to Vienna Standard Mean Ocean Water (VSMOW) or Vienna Pee Dee Belemnite (VPDB). Variations in oxygen isotope ratios are used to track both water movement, paleoclimate, and atmospheric gases such as ozone and carbon dioxide. Typically, the VPDB oxygen reference is used for paleoclimate, while VSMOW is used for most other applications. Oxygen isotopes appear in anomalous ratios in atmospheric ozone, resulting from mass-independent fractionation. Isotope ratios in fossilized foraminifera have been used to deduce the temperature of ancient seas.

=== Sulfur ===
Sulfur has four stable isotopes, with the following abundances: ^{32}S (0.9502), ^{33}S (0.0075), ^{34}S (0.0421) and ^{36}S (0.0002). These abundances are compared to those found in Cañon Diablo troilite. Variations in sulfur isotope ratios are used to study the origin of sulfur in an orebody and the temperature of formation of sulfur–bearing minerals as well as a biosignature that can reveal presence of sulfate reducing microbes.

== Radiogenic isotope geochemistry ==
Radiogenic isotopes provide powerful tracers for studying the ages and origins of Earth systems. They are particularly useful to understand mixing processes between different components, because (heavy) radiogenic isotope ratios are not usually fractionated by chemical processes.

Radiogenic isotope tracers are most powerful when used together with other tracers: The more tracers used, the more control on mixing processes. An example of this application is to the evolution of the Earth's crust and Earth's mantle through geological time.

=== Lead–lead isotope geochemistry ===
Lead has four stable isotopes: ^{204}Pb, ^{206}Pb, ^{207}Pb, and ^{208}Pb.

Lead is created in the Earth via decay of actinide elements, primarily uranium and thorium.

Lead isotope geochemistry is useful for providing isotopic dates on a variety of materials. Because the lead isotopes are created by decay of different transuranic elements, the ratios of the four lead isotopes to one another can be very useful in tracking the source of melts in igneous rocks, the source of sediments and even the origin of people via isotopic fingerprinting of their teeth, skin and bones.

It has been used to date ice cores from the Arctic shelf, and provides information on the source of atmospheric lead pollution.

Lead–lead isotopes has been successfully used in forensic science to fingerprint bullets, because each batch of ammunition has its own peculiar ^{204}Pb/^{206}Pb vs ^{207}Pb/^{208}Pb ratio.

=== Samarium–neodymium ===
Samarium–neodymium is an isotope system which can be utilised to provide a date as well as isotopic fingerprints of geological materials, and various other materials including archaeological finds (pots, ceramics).

^{147}Sm decays to produce ^{143}Nd with a half-life of 1.06×10^{11} years.

Dating is achieved usually by trying to produce an isochron of several minerals within a rock specimen. The initial ^{143}Nd/^{144}Nd ratio is determined.

This initial ratio is modelled relative to CHUR (the Chondritic Uniform Reservoir), which is an approximation of the chondritic material which formed the Solar System. CHUR was determined by analysing chondrite and achondrite meteorites.

The difference in the ratio of the sample relative to CHUR can give information on a model age of extraction from the mantle (for which an assumed evolution has been calculated relative to CHUR) and to whether this was extracted from a granitic source (depleted in radiogenic Nd), the mantle, or an enriched source.

=== Rhenium–osmium ===
Rhenium and osmium are siderophile elements which are present at very low abundances in the crust. Rhenium undergoes radioactive decay to produce osmium. The ratio of non-radiogenic osmium to radiogenic osmium throughout time varies.

Rhenium prefers to enter sulfides more readily than osmium. Hence, during melting of the mantle, rhenium is stripped out, and prevents the osmium–osmium ratio from changing appreciably. This locks in an initial osmium ratio of the sample at the time of the melting event. Osmium–osmium initial ratios are used to determine the source characteristic and age of mantle melting events.

== Noble gas isotopes ==
Natural isotopic variations amongst the noble gases result from both radiogenic and nucleogenic production processes. Because of their unique properties, it is useful to distinguish them from the conventional radiogenic isotope systems described above.

=== Helium-3 ===
Helium-3 was trapped in the planet when it formed. Some ^{3}He is being added by meteoric dust, primarily collecting on the bottom of oceans (although due to subduction, all oceanic tectonic plates are younger than continental plates). However, ^{3}He will be degassed from oceanic sediment during subduction, so cosmogenic ^{3}He is not affecting the concentration or noble gas ratios of the mantle.

Helium-3 is created by cosmic ray bombardment, and by lithium spallation reactions which generally occur in the crust. Lithium spallation is the process by which a high-energy neutron bombards a lithium atom, creating a ^{3}He and a ^{4}He ion. This requires significant lithium to adversely affect the ^{3}He/^{4}He ratio.

All degassed helium is lost to space eventually, as it is less dense than the atmosphere and thus steadily rises until subject to charge exchange escape. Thus, it is assumed the helium content and ratios of Earth's atmosphere have remained essentially stable.

It has been observed that ^{3}He is present in volcano emissions and oceanic ridge samples. How ^{3}He is stored in the planet is under investigation, but it is associated with the mantle and is used as a marker of material of deep origin.

Due to similarities in helium and carbon in magma chemistry, outgassing of helium requires the loss of volatile components (water, carbon dioxide) from the mantle, which happens at depths of less than 60 km. However, ^{3}He is transported to the surface primarily trapped in the crystal lattice of minerals within fluid inclusions.

Helium-4 is created by radiogenic production (by decay of uranium/thorium-series elements). The continental crust has become enriched with those elements relative to the mantle and thus more He^{4} is produced in the crust than in the mantle.

The ratio (R) of ^{3}He to ^{4}He is often used to represent ^{3}He content. R usually is given as a multiple of the present atmospheric ratio (Ra).

Common values for R/Ra:

- Old continental crust: less than 1
- Mid-ocean ridge basalt (MORB): 7 to 9
- Spreading ridge rocks: 9.1 plus or minus 3.6
- Hotspot rocks: 5 to 42
- Ocean and terrestrial water: 1
- Sedimentary formation water: less than 1
- Thermal spring water: 3 to 11

^{3}He/^{4}He isotope chemistry is being used to date groundwaters, estimate groundwater flow rates, track water pollution, and provide insights into hydrothermal processes, igneous geology and ore genesis.

- (U-Th)/He dating of apatite as a thermal history tool
- USGS: Helium Discharge at Mammoth Mountain Fumarole (MMF)

== Isotopes in actinide decay chains ==
Isotopes in the decay chains of actinides are unique amongst radiogenic isotopes because they are both radiogenic and radioactive. Because their abundances are normally quoted as activity ratios rather than atomic ratios, they are best considered separately from the other radiogenic isotope systems.

=== Protactinium/Thorium – ^{231}Pa/^{230}Th ===
Uranium is well mixed in the ocean, and its decay produces ^{231}Pa and ^{230}Th at a constant activity ratio (0.093). The decay products are rapidly removed by adsorption on settling particles, but not at equal rates. ^{231}Pa has a residence equivalent to the residence time of deep water in the Atlantic basin (around 1000 yrs) but ^{230}Th is removed more rapidly (centuries). Thermohaline circulation effectively exports ^{231}Pa from the Atlantic into the Southern Ocean, while most of the ^{230}Th remains in Atlantic sediments. As a result, there is a relationship between ^{231}Pa/^{230}Th in Atlantic sediments and the rate of overturning: faster overturning produces lower sediment ^{231}Pa/^{230}Th ratio, while slower overturning increases this ratio. The combination of δ^{13}C and ^{231}Pa/^{230}Th can therefore provide a more complete insight into past circulation changes.

== Anthropogenic isotopes ==
=== Tritium/helium-3 ===
Tritium was released to the atmosphere during atmospheric testing of nuclear bombs. Radioactive decay of tritium produces the noble gas helium-3. Comparing the ratio of tritium to helium-3 (^{3}H/^{3}He) allows estimation of the age of recent ground waters. A small amount of tritium is also produced naturally by cosmic ray spallation and spontaneous ternary fission in natural uranium and thorium, but due to the relatively short half-life of tritium and the relatively small quantities (compared to those from anthropogenic sources) those sources of tritium usually play only a secondary role in the analysis of groundwater.

- USGS Tritium/Helium-3 Dating
- Hydrologic Isotope Tracers - Helium

== See also ==
- Cosmogenic isotopes
- Environmental isotopes
- Geochemistry
- Isotopic signature
- Radiometric dating
- Isotope-ratio mass spectrometry
- Sulfur isotope biogeochemistry
- Urey–Bigeleisen–Mayer equation
