= Kinetic fractionation =

Separation of stable isotopes by their mass during unidirectional processes

Kinetic fractionation is an isotopic fractionation process that separates stable isotopes from each other by their mass during unidirectional processes. Biological processes are generally unidirectional and are very good examples of "kinetic" isotope reactions. All organisms preferentially use lighter isotopes, because "energy costs" are lower, resulting in a significant fractionation between the substrate (heavier) and the biologically mediated product (lighter). For example, photosynthesis preferentially takes up the light isotope of carbon ^{12}C during assimilation of atmospheric CO_{2}. This kinetic isotope fractionation explains why plant material (and thus fossil fuels, which are derived from plants) is typically depleted in δ^{13}C by 25 per mil (25‰) relative to most inorganic carbon on Earth.

The sulfur isotopic composition in Earth materials varies because of bacterial activity. In particular, certain sulfate reducing bacteria (SRB) can reduce ^{32}SO^{2−}_{4} 1.07 times faster than ^{34}SO^{2−}_{4}, which may increase the ^{34}S/^{32}S ratio in the residual sulfate by up to 10%, while this ratio simultaneously decreases in the reduced sulfides. So, the ^{34}S/^{32}S ratio is a helpful indicator for microbial sulfate reduction. In contrast, the sulfur isotopic ratio is very constant in iron meteorites. For this reason, the standard for sulfur isotopes is the Canyon Diablo meteorite, a troilite (FeS)-containing meteorite. Canyon Diablo Troilite (CDT) is the standard of relative concentration of different isotopes of sulfur.

A naturally occurring example of non-biological kinetic fractionation occurs during the evaporation of seawater to form clouds under conditions in which some part of the transport is unidirectional, such as evaporation into very dry air. In this case, lighter water molecules (molecules with ^{16}O) evaporate slightly more easily than heavier water molecules with ^{18}O; this difference will be greater than it would be if the evaporation was taking place under equilibrium conditions (with bidirectional transport).

During this process the oxygen isotopes are fractionated: the clouds become enriched with ^{16}O, and the seawater becomes enriched in δ^{18}O. Whereas equilibrium fractionation makes the vapor about 10 per mil (10‰) depleted in δ^{18}O relative to the liquid water, kinetic fractionation enhances this fractionation and often makes vapor that is about 15 per mil (15‰) depleted. Condensation occurs almost exclusively by equilibrium processes, and so it enriches cloud droplets somewhat less than evaporation depletes the vapor. This explains part of the reason why rainwater is observed to be isotopically lighter than seawater.

The heavy isotope of hydrogen in water, deuterium (^{2}H), is much less sensitive to kinetic fractionation than oxygen isotopes, relative to the very large equilibrium fractionation of deuterium. Therefore kinetic fractionation does not deplete δD nearly as much, in a relative sense, as δ^{18}O. This gives rise to an excess of deuterium in vapor and rainfall, relative to seawater. This results in a 'deuterium excess' (d) typically valued at +10 per mil (10‰) in most meteoric waters; its non-zero value is a direct manifestation of kinetic isotope fractionation.

A generalized treatment of kinetic isotopic effects is via the GEBIK and GEBIF equations describing transient kinetic isotope effects.

== Other types of fractionation ==
- Equilibrium fractionation
- Mass-independent fractionation
- Transient kinetic isotope fractionation

== See also ==
- Isotopic enrichment
- Isotopic ratio
- Kinetic isotope effect
- Hydrogen isotope biogeochemistry
