= Isotope electrochemistry =

Isotope electrochemistry is a field within electrochemistry concerned with various topics like electrochemical separation of isotopes, electrochemical estimation of isotopic exchange equilibrium constants, electrochemical kinetic isotope effect, electrochemical isotope sensors, etc.

It is an active domain of investigation. It overlaps with many other domains of both theoretical and practical importance like nuclear engineering, radiochemistry, electrochemical technology, geochemistry, sensors and instrumentation.

== See also ==
- Bioelectrochemical reactor
- Concentration cell
- Electrochemical cell
- Electrochemical engineering
- Equilibrium fractionation
- Transient kinetic isotope fractionation
