= Isotope fractionation =

Processes involved in the separation of isotopes

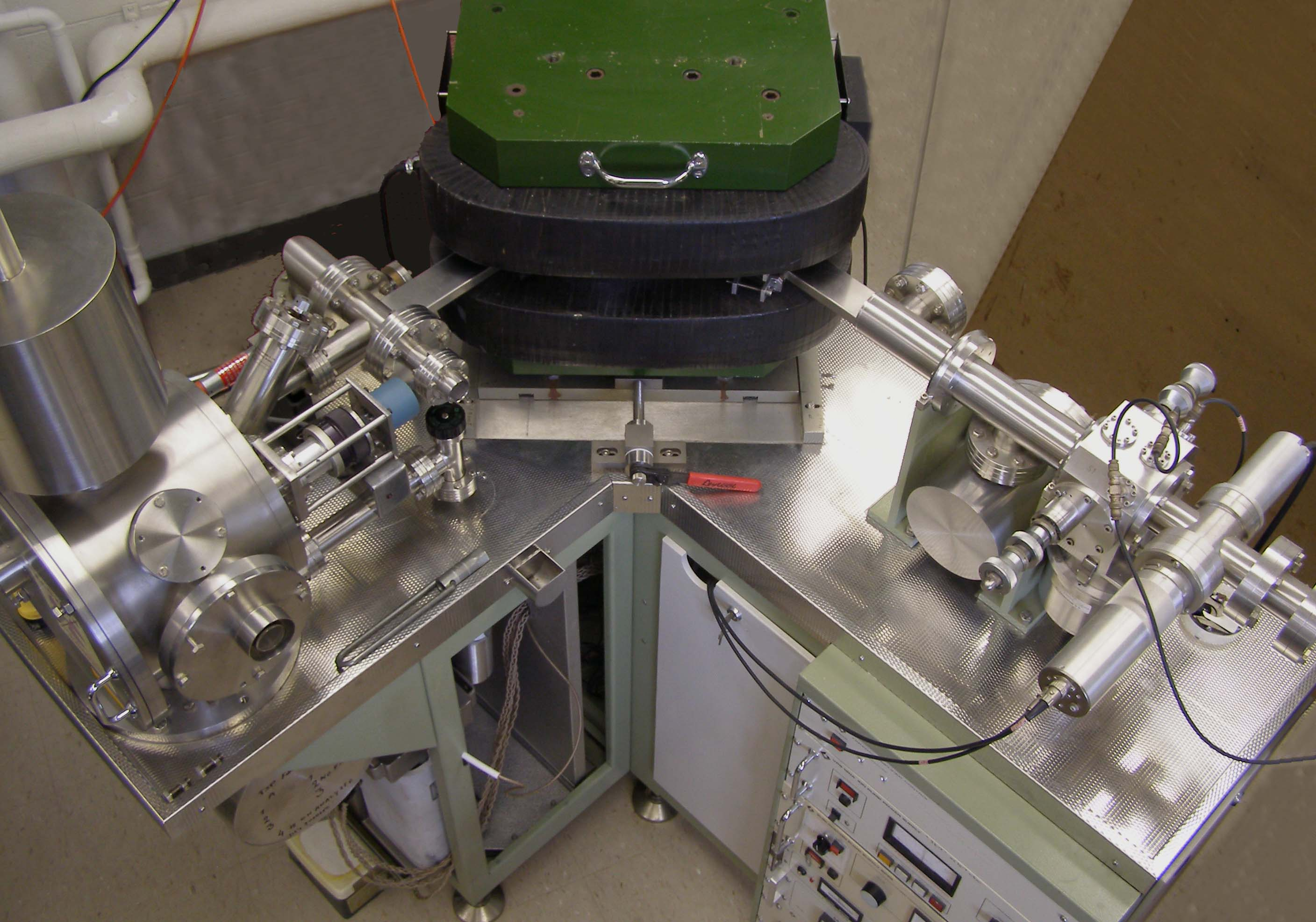
Magnetic sector mass spectrometer used in isotope ratio analysis, through thermal ionization.

Isotope fractionation describes fractionation processes that affect the relative abundance of isotopes, a phenomenon that occurs (and so advantage is taken of it) in the study geochemistry, biochemistry, food science, and other fields. Normally, the focus is on stable isotopes of the same element. Isotopic fractionation can be measured by isotope analysis, using isotope-ratio mass spectrometry, nuclear magnetic resonance methods (specialised techniques,) cavity ring-down spectroscopy, etc., to measure ratios of isotopes, important tools to understand geochemical and biological systems, past and present. For example, biochemical processes cause changes in ratios of stable carbon isotopes incorporated into biomass.

== Definition ==
Stable isotopes partitioning between two substances A and B can be expressed by the use of the isotopic fractionation factor (alpha):

α_{A-B} = R_{A}/R_{B}

where R is the ratio of the heavy to light isotope (e.g., ^{2}H/^{1}H or ^{18}O/^{16}O). Values for alpha tend to be very close to 1.

== Types ==
There are four types of isotope fractionation (of which the first two are normally most important): equilibrium fractionation, kinetic fractionation, mass-independent fractionation (or non-mass-dependent fractionation), and transient kinetic isotope fractionation.

== Example ==
Isotope fractionation occurs during a phase transition, when the ratio of light to heavy isotopes in the involved molecules changes. As Carol Kendall of the USGS states in an information page for the USGS Isotope Tracers Project, "water vapor condenses (an equilibrium process), the heavier water isotopes (^{18}O and ^{2}H) become enriched in the liquid phase while the lighter isotopes (^{16}O and ^{1}H) tend toward the vapor phase".

== See also ==
- Isotope separation
