= Equilibrium fractionation =

Partial separation of isotopes in chemical equilibrium

Equilibrium isotope fractionation is the partial separation of isotopes between two or more substances in chemical equilibrium. Equilibrium fractionation is strongest at low temperatures, and (along with kinetic isotope effects) forms the basis of the most widely used isotopic paleothermometers (or climate proxies): D/H and ^{18}O/^{16}O records from ice cores, and ^{18}O/^{16}O records from calcium carbonate. It is thus important for the construction of geologic temperature records. Isotopic fractionations attributed to equilibrium processes have been observed in many elements, from hydrogen (D/H) to uranium (^{238}U/^{235}U). In general, the light elements (especially hydrogen, boron, carbon, nitrogen, oxygen and sulfur) are most susceptible to fractionation, and their isotopes tend to be separated to a greater degree than heavier elements.

== Definition ==
Most equilibrium fractionations are thought to result from the reduction in vibrational energy (especially zero-point energy) when a more massive isotope is substituted for a less massive one. This leads to higher concentrations of the massive isotopes in substances where the vibrational energy is most sensitive to isotope substitution, i.e., those with the highest bond force constants.

In a reaction involving the exchange of two isotopes, ^{l}X and ^{h}X, of element "X" in molecules AX and BX,

$$\ce{A^\mathit{l} X{} + B^\mathit{h} X <=> A^\mathit{h} X{} +  B^\mathit{l} X}$$

each reactant molecule is identical to a product except for the distribution of isotopes (i.e., they are isotopologues). The amount of isotopic fractionation in an exchange reaction can be expressed as a fractionation factor:

$$\alpha = \frac{(^h\ce{X}/^l\ce{X})_\ce{AX}}{(^h\ce{X}/^l\ce{X})_\ce{BX}}$$

$\alpha = 1$ indicates that the isotopes are distributed evenly between AX and BX, with no isotopic fractionation. $\alpha > 1$ indicates that ^{h}X is concentrated in substance AX, and $\alpha < 1$ indicates ^{h}X is concentrated in substance BX. α is closely related to the equilibrium constant (K_{eq}):

$$\alpha = (K_{eq} \cdot \Pi \sigma_{Products}/ \Pi \sigma_{Reactants})^{1/n}$$

where $\Pi\sigma_{Products}$ is the product of the rotational symmetry numbers of the products (right side of the exchange reaction), $\Pi\sigma_{Reactants}$ is the product of the rotational symmetry numbers of the reactants (left side of the exchange reaction), and n is the number of atoms exchanged.

An example of equilibrium isotope fractionation is the concentration of heavy isotopes of oxygen in liquid water, relative to water vapor,

$$\ce{{H2{^{16}O}{(l)}} + {H2{^{18}O}{(g)}} <=> {H2{^{18}O}{(l)}} + {H2{^{16}O}{(g)}}}$$

At 20 °C, the equilibrium fractionation factor for this reaction is

$$\alpha = \frac\ce{(^{18}O/^{16}O)_{Liquid}}\ce{(^{18}O/^{16}O)_{Vapor}} = 1.0098$$

Equilibrium fractionation is a type of mass-dependent isotope fractionation, while mass-independent fractionation is usually assumed to be a non-equilibrium process.

For non-equilibrium reactions, isotopic effects are better described by the GEBIK and GEBIF equations for transient kinetic isotope fractionation, which generalize non-steady isotopic effects in any chemical and biochemical reactions.

== Example ==
When water vapor condenses (an equilibrium fractionation), the heavier water isotopes (H_{2}^{18}O and ^{2}H_{2}O) become enriched in the liquid phase while the lighter isotopes (H_{2}^{16}O and ^{1}H_{2}O) tend toward the vapor phase.

== Other types of fractionation ==
- Kinetic fractionation
- Mass-independent fractionation
- Transient kinetic isotope fractionation

== See also ==
- Equilibrium constant § Effect of isotopic substitution
- Isotope analysis
- Isotope electrochemistry
- Isotope geochemistry
- Kinetic isotope effect
- Stable isotope
- Standard electrode potential
