= Stable isotope ratio =

Property of chemical elements

A stable-isotope ratio is the ratio of the number of atoms of two isotopes of the same chemical element in one system. It is also known as a isotope-number ratio. As stable isotope is an isotope which does not decay. The relative abundance of such stable isotopes can be measured experimentally (isotope analysis), yielding an isotope ratio that can be used as a research tool. Theoretically, such stable isotopes could include the radiogenic daughter products of radioactive decay, used in radiometric dating. However, the expression stable-isotope ratio is preferably used to refer to isotopes whose relative abundances are affected by isotope fractionation in nature. This field is termed stable isotope geochemistry.

== Stable-isotope ratios ==
Measurement of the ratios of naturally occurring stable isotopes (isotope analysis) plays an important role in isotope geochemistry, but stable isotopes (mostly hydrogen, carbon, nitrogen, oxygen and sulfur) are also finding uses in ecological and biological studies. Other workers have used oxygen isotope ratios to reconstruct historical atmospheric temperatures, making them important tools for paleoclimatology.

Example of common isotope ratios analyzed are ^{2}H/^{1}H, ^{18}O/^{16}O, and ^{17}O/^{16}O for ocean water, and ^{15}N/^{14}N for air.

These isotope systems for lighter elements that exhibit more than one primordial isotope for each element have been under investigation for many years in order to study processes of isotope fractionation in natural systems. The long history of study of these elements is in part because the proportions of stable isotopes in these light and volatile elements is relatively easy to measure. However, recent advances in isotope ratio mass spectrometry (i.e. multiple-collector inductively coupled plasma mass spectrometry) now enable the measurement of isotope ratios in heavier stable elements, such as iron, copper, zinc, molybdenum, etc.

== Applications ==
The variations in oxygen and hydrogen isotope ratios have applications in hydrology since most samples lie between two extremes, ocean water and Arctic/Antarctic snow. Given a sample of water from an aquifer, and a sufficiently sensitive tool to measure the variation in the isotopic ratio of hydrogen in the sample, it is possible to infer the source, be it ocean water or precipitation seeping into the aquifer, and even to estimate the proportions from each source. Stable isotopologues of water are also used in partitioning water sources for plant transpiration and groundwater recharge.

Another application is in paleotemperature measurement for paleoclimatology. For example, one technique is based on the variation in isotopic fractionation of oxygen by biological systems with temperature. Species of Foraminifera incorporate oxygen as calcium carbonate in their shells. The ratio of the oxygen isotopes oxygen-16 and oxygen-18 incorporated into the calcium carbonate varies with temperature and the oxygen isotopic composition of the water. This oxygen remains "fixed" in the calcium carbonate when the foraminifera dies, falls to the sea bed, and its shell becomes part of the sediment. It is possible to select standard species of foraminifera from sections through the sediment column, and by mapping the variation in oxygen isotopic ratio, deduce the temperature that the Forminifera encountered during life if changes in the oxygen isotopic composition of the water can be constrained. Paleotemperature relationships have also enabled isotope ratios from calcium carbonate in barnacle shells to be used to infer the movement and home foraging areas of the sea turtles and whales on which some barnacles grow.

In ecology, carbon and nitrogen isotope ratios are widely used to determine the broad diets of many free-ranging animals. They have been used to determine the broad diets of seabirds, and to identify the geographical areas where individuals spend the breeding and non-breeding season in seabirds and passerines. Numerous ecological studies have also used isotope analyses to understand migration, food-web structure, diet, and resource use, such as hydrogen isotopes to measure how much energy from stream-side trees supports fish growth in aquatic habitats. Determining diets of aquatic animals using stable isotopes has been particularly common, as direct observations are difficult. They also enable researchers to measure how human interactions with wildlife, such as fishing, may alter natural diets. Based on the known C_{14} ratios of C_{3} plants and marine wildlife, researchers can determine the relative proportion of ancient humans' diets that was made up of marine sources versus terrestrial sources such as agriculture or animal husbandry.

In forensic science, research suggests that the variation in certain isotope ratios in drugs derived from plant sources (cannabis, cocaine) can be used to determine the drug's continent of origin.

In food science, stable isotope ratio analysis has been used to determine the composition of beer, shoyu sauce and dog food.

Stable isotope ratio analysis also has applications in doping control, to distinguish between endogenous and exogenous (synthetic) sources of hormones.

The accurate measurement of stable isotope ratios relies on proper procedures of analysis, sample preparation and storage.

Chondrite meteorites are classified using the oxygen isotope ratios. In addition, an unusual signature of carbon-13 confirms the non-terrestrial origin for organic compounds found in carbonaceous chondrites, as in the Murchison meteorite.

Stable isotope ratio analysis has also been used for at least three decades in the study of whole-aquatic ecosystems and marine food webs. Among the most common types of analysis in this regard is using ^{13}C and ^{15}N as tracers in isotope enrichment experiments. Using stable isotope fertilization, wherein experimenters "seed" stable isotopes into an aquatic ecosystem and measure how they pass through, researchers have been able to identify many novel metabolic and trophic cascade effects. Such an approach has been used to study carbon uptake, nutrient limitation, and groundwater filtration.

The uses of stable isotope ratios described above pertain to measurements of naturally occurring ratios. Scientific research also relies on the measurement of stable isotope ratios that have been artificially perturbed by the introduction of isotopically enriched material into the substance, process or system under study. Isotope dilution involves adding enriched stable isotope to a substance in order to quantify the amount of that substance by measuring the resulting isotope ratios. Isotope labeling uses enriched isotope to label a substance in order to trace its progress through, for example, a chemical reaction, metabolic pathway or biological system. Some applications of isotope labeling rely on the measurement of stable isotope ratios to accomplish this.

== See also ==
- Radiocarbon dating
- Isotope analysis
- Hydrogen isotope biogeochemistry
