= Isotopic analysis by nuclear magnetic resonance =

Isotopic analysis by nuclear magnetic resonance refers to an overarching set of methodologies to precisely quantify differences in isotopic content at each atom of a molecule, and thus to measure the specific natural isotope fractionation for each site of the molecule. One such method, SNIF-NMR—the corresponding English of the original French acronym, which abbreviates site-specific natural isotopic fractionation-nuclear magnetic resonance—is an analytical method developed to detect the over-sugaring of wine and enrichment of grape musts. As of this date, its main use has been to check the authenticity of foodstuffs such as wines, spirits, fruit juice, honey, sugar, and vinegar, and of flavorant and odorant molecules such as vanillin, benzaldehyde, raspberry ketone, and anethole. The SNIF-NMR method in particular has been adopted by the International Organisation of Vine and Wine (OIV) and the European Union as an official method for wine analysis, by the Association of Official Agricultural Chemists (AOAC) as an official method for analyzing fruit juices, maple syrup, vanillin, and by the European Committee for Standardization (CEN) for analyzing vinegar.

== History ==
=== History of SNIF-NMR ===
==== Discovery ====
- 1981: Invention, as RMN-FINS, the acronym for fractionnement isotopique naturel spécifique par résonance magnétique nucléaire (see following), by Gerard Martin, Maryvonne Martin, and their team at the University of Nantes/CNRS.
- 1987-1990: Eurofins Laboratories applied the SNIF-NMR method to the analysis of fruit juices and certain natural flavors.
- 1990-1992: the method is tested on aromatic molecules.

==== Organisational recognition ====
- 1990: The SNIF-NMR method is recognized by the European Union as an official method for the analysis of wines.
- 1996: The SNIF-NMR method is recognized in the United States by the Association of Official Agricultural Chemists (AOAC) for fruit juices.
- 2001: The SNIF-NMR method is recognized by the AOAC for vanillin.
- 2013: The SNIF-NMR method is recognized by the European Committee for Standardization for acetic acid.
- The International Organisation of Vine and Wine (OIV) adopts it as an official method.

== Principle ==
=== Isotopic distribution ===
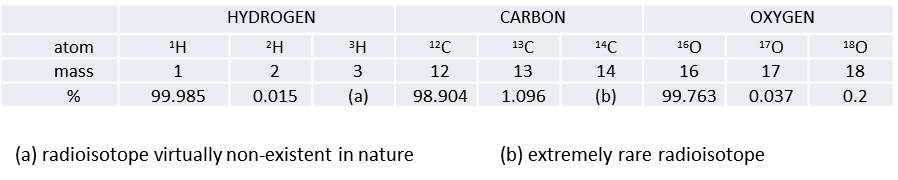
Natural abundances of hydrogen, carbon and oxygen. [From Eurofins Analytics France]

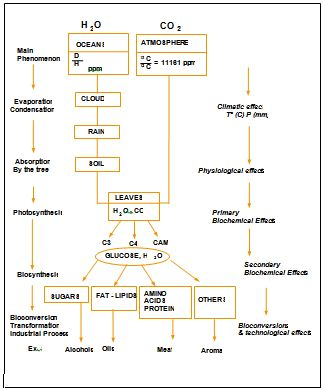
Isotopic Fractionation Sources. [From Eurofins Analytics France]

The atoms hydrogen, oxygen, and carbon co-exist naturally in specific proportions with their stable isotopes, ^{2}H (or deuterium), ^{18}O, and ^{13}C, respectively, as shown in the figure.

The amount and distribution of the different isotopes in a molecule are natural products influenced by:

- Environmental (climatic and geographical) conditions, and
- Chemical or biochemical processes, primary metabolism, photosynthetic metabolism in plants, etc.

A phenomenon known as natural isotopic fractionation (see figure) means that an isotopic fingerprint composed of ratios of isotopes at each atom of a molecule can be determined in order to provide information on the origin—botanical, synthetic, geographical of the molecule or product.

=== Principles underlying specific methods ===
==== SNIF-NMR ====
SNIF-NMR is based on the principle of fractionation of carbon isotopes in oxygenic photosynthesis (isotope fractionation). NMR of two nuclei are routinely used for assessing food authenticity:

- Hydrogen nuclei: the ^{2}H-SNIF-NMR method, which was the original application of SNIF-NMR, measures the ratio of deuterium to hydrogen of the hydrogen atoms ini a sample molecule; and
- Carbon nuclei: the ^{13}C-SNIF-NMR method has made for new applications of SNIF-NMR, where the method determines the ratio of ^{13}C (carbon-13) to ^{12}C of the carbon atoms in a sample molecule.

===== Steps of the method =====
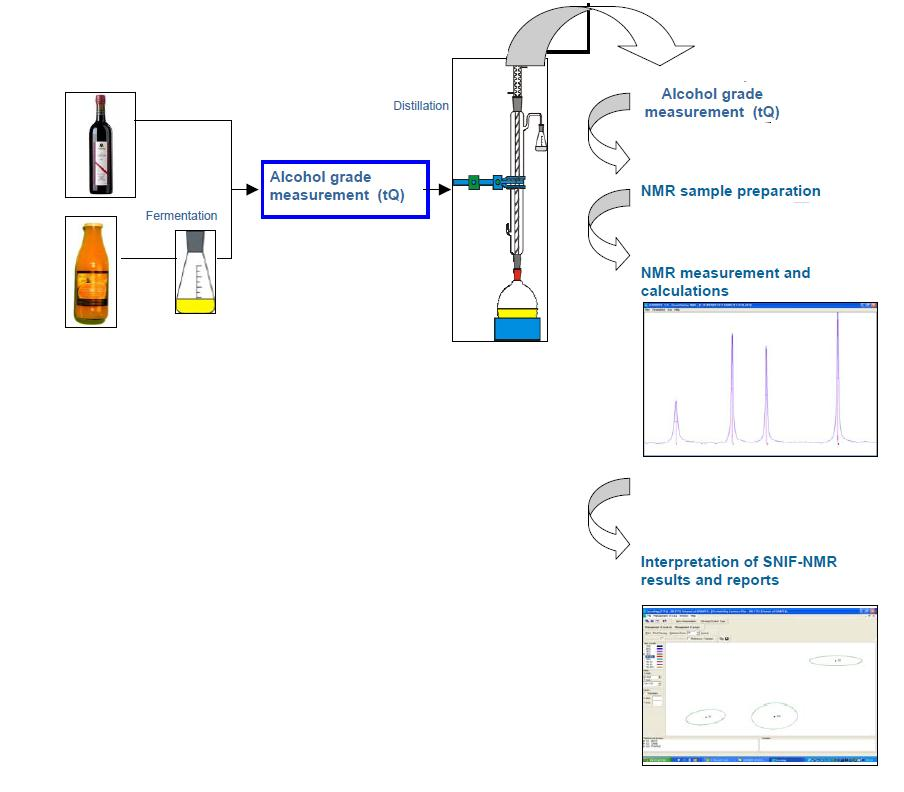
Steps in the SNIF-NMR of ethanol. [From Eurofins Analytics France]

The SNIF-NMR method is applied to purified molecules; therefore, preparative steps are required before instrumental analysis. For example, for the SNIF-NMR of ethanol, according to official methods, preparative steps include:

- fermentation (for fruit juices);
- quantitative extraction of ethanol by distillation; and
- standardized preparation of NMR samples, followed by NMR acquisition, interpretation of the results, and a report regarding sample authenticity.

At each step of the SNIF-NMR sample preparation and analysis, efforts are made to avoid parasitic isotopic fractionation. Control measurements, such as determining the alcoholic strength of the intermediate products of the analysis (fermented juice or distillate), are performed on each sample.

===== Advantages of the method =====
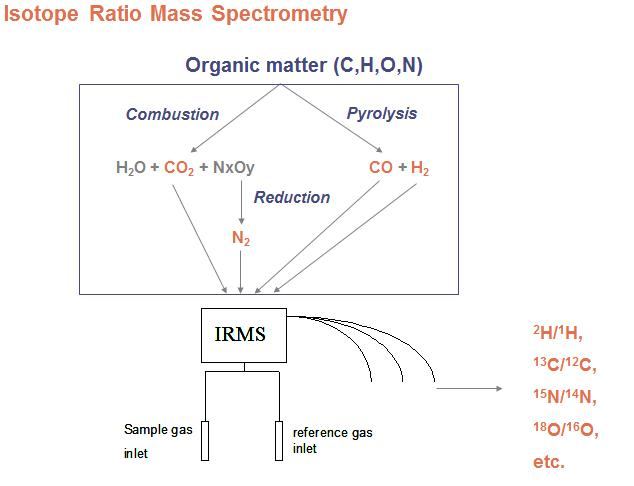
Principle of the IRMS. [From Eurofins Analytics France]

The isotopic ratios of a molecule can also be determined by isotope ratio mass spectrometry (IRMS). The sample quantity required for IRMS is much lower than that for NMR, and it is possible to couple the mass spectrometer to a chromatographic system to enable online purification or analysis of multiple components in a complex mixture. However, the sample is burnt after a physical transformation such as combustion or pyrolysis. Therefore, it merely gives the mean concentration of the studied isotope across all sites of the molecule. IRMS is the official AOAC technique used for the average ratio ^{13}C/^{12}C (or δ^{13}C) of sugars or ethanol, and the official CEN and OIV method for the ^{18}O/^{16}O in water.

The SNIF-NMR method can determine, with high accuracy, the isotopic ratios at each site of the molecule, enabling better discrimination. For example, for ethanol (CH_{3}CH_{2}OH), the three ratios ((D/H)CH_{3}, (D/H)CH_{2}, and (D/H)_{OH}) can be obtained.

===== An example ^{2}H-SNIF-NMR Spectrum =====
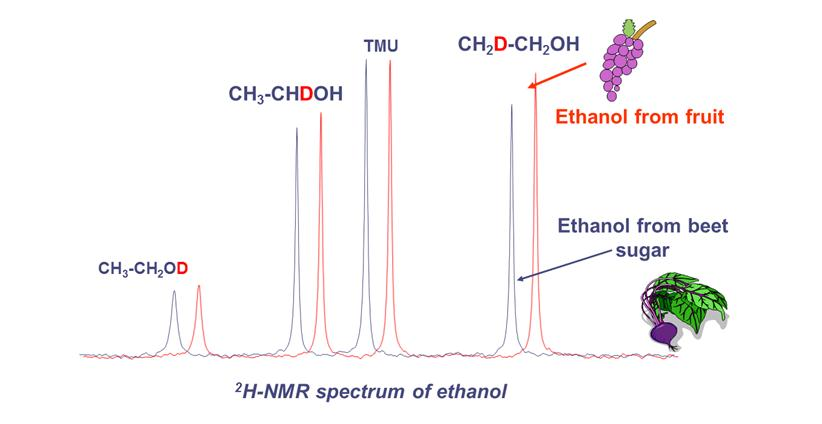
^{2}H (Deuterium) NMR spectrum of ethanol. [From Eurofins Analytics France]

Ethanol molecules obtained after complete fermentation of a sugar coexist with 3 naturally monodeuterated isotopomers (CH_{2}D-CH_{2}-OH, CH_{3}-CHDOH, and-CH_{3}-CH_{2}OD). Their presence can then be quantified with relative precision. In the presented ^{2}H-NMR spectrum, peaks correspond to one of the three observed isotopomers of ethanol.

In the official method of the AOAC, the ratios of deuterium (D)/hydrogen (H) of CH_{3} and the D/H of CH_{2} are calculated by comparison with an internal standard, tetramethylurea (TMU), with a certified (D/H) value.

===== Interpretation of SNIF-NMR isotopic values =====
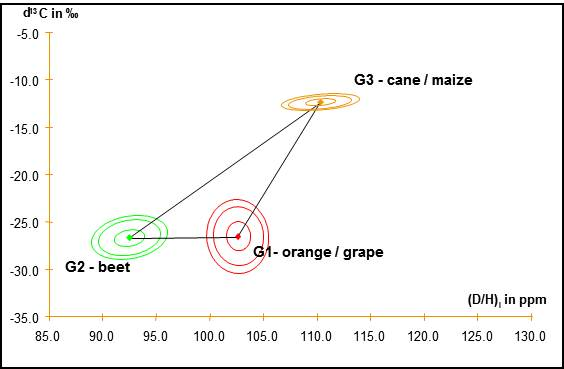
The adulteration triangle: Re-partition of isotopic ratios on ethanol molecules. [From Eurofins Analytics France]

The figure summarizes the principles of interpretation applied:

- Results measured by IRMS (isotopic deviation of δ ^{13}C), which enable discrimination of plants according to their CO_{2} photosynthetic metabolism (C4, as in corn or maize, versus C3, as in beet, orange, or grape);
- Results measured by SNIF-NMR that can differentiate the botanical origin of sugars within the same metabolic group (e.g., beet versus orange or grape).

Values obtained on a test sample are then compared with the values of certifiably authentic sample data.

== Applications ==
=== Of SNIF-NMR ===
==== ^{2}H-SNIF-NMR ====
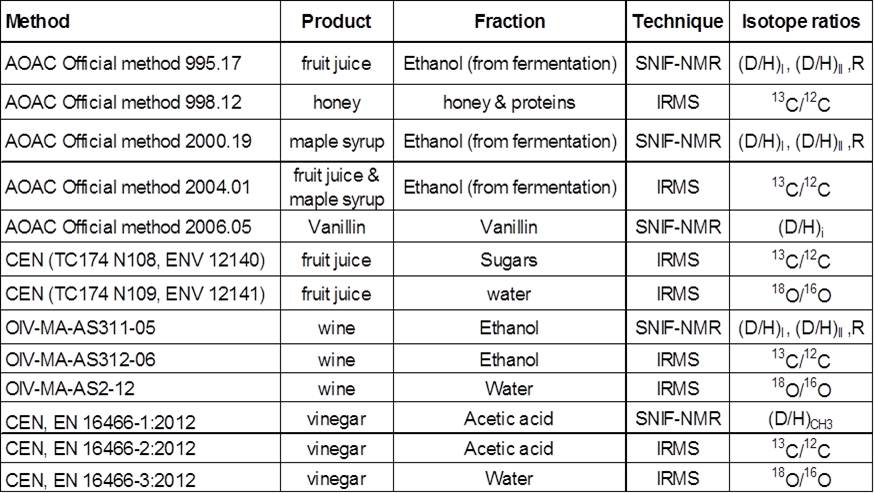
Isotope method recognition for food application, 2013. [From Eurofins Analytics France]

===== Fruit juice and maple syrup =====
AOAC Official Method for detecting the addition of sugar in a fruit juice or in maple syrup. It is the only reliable method for detecting the addition of C3 sugar (e.g., beet sugar).

===== Authenticity of wines =====
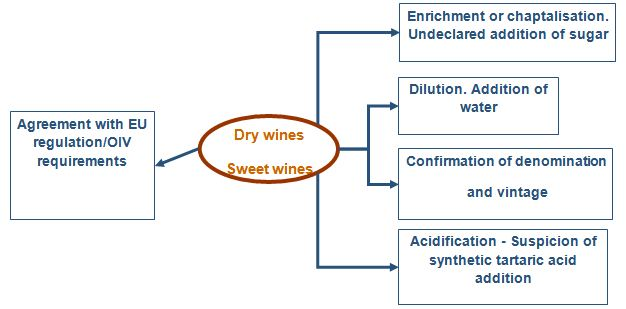
Applications of SNIF-NMR and IRMS to wine authenticity. [From Eurofins Analytics France]

SNIF-NMR is the official method of the OIV for determining the authenticity of wine origin, and, as of this date, is the only method to detect C3 sugar addition (such as beet sugar).

The isotopic parameters of both water and ethanol are related to the humidity and temperature of the growing region of the plant. Therefore, consideration of the region's meteorological data and the year helps make a diagnosis. In the case of wine and fruit, the isotopic parameters of ethanol have been shown to respond even to subtle environmental variations and efficiently characterize the region of production.

Since 1991, an isotopic data bank has been built at the Joint Research Center of the European Commission (EC-JRC) for wines from all European member states. The database contains several thousand entries for European wines, and is maintained and updated every year. This database is accessible for all official public laboratories. Private companies involved in food and beverage controls have also collected authentic samples and built up specific data banks.

Thus, by comparing the specific natural isotope fractionation corresponding to each site of a molecule of ethanol in wine with that of a molecule known and referenced in a database. The geographical origin, botany, and method of production of the ethanol molecule, and thus the authenticity of the wine, can be checked.

===== Acetic acid in vinegar =====
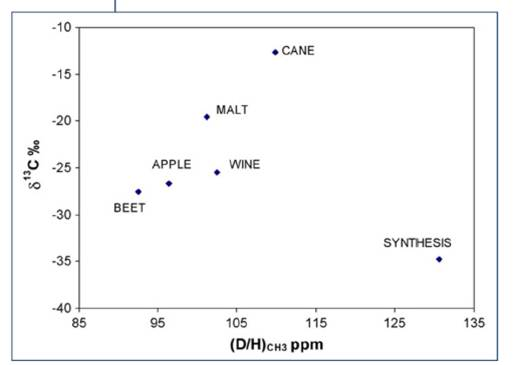
Application to vinegar. [From Eurofins Analytics France]

The origins of vinegars obtained by bacterial or chemical oxidation of ethanol resulting from the fermentation of various sugars can be identified by the ^{2}H-SNIF-NMR. It allows control of vinegar quality and determination of whether it comes from sugar cane, wine, malt, cider, or alcohol, or from chemical synthesis.

===== Vanillin =====
As of 2019, ^{2}H-SNIF-NMR is the official AOAC method for determining the natural vanillin.

The abundance of five monodeuterated isotopomers for vanillin can be measured by ^{2}H-SNIF-NMR. Data for vanillin are shown in the figure; all observable sites for which the site-specific deuterium concentrations can be measured are referenced with a number.

As for wine or fruit, the interpretation of results regarding origin is done by comparison of the isotopic parameters of the sample analyzed with those from a group of referenced molecules of known origin. Origins of vanillin are well discriminated using ^{2}H-NMR data; in particular, vanillin from the ex-bean can be well distinguished from the other sources (see next figure).

Additionally, this method is the only one to discriminate between natural and biosynthetic sources of vanillin.

===== Other odorants =====
The naturality of different aromas can also be checked using SNIF-NMR: for example, for anethole, abundance of only six monodeuterated isotopomers can be measured by ^{2}H-SNIF-NMR that allows differentiating the botanical origins fennel, star anise, or pine.

===== Other applications =====
SNIF-NMR applied to benzaldehyde can detect adulteration in bitter almond and cinnamon oils. It is demonstrated that the site specific deuterium contents of benzaldehyde allow the determination of the origin of the molecule: synthetic (ex-toluene and ex-benzal chloride), natural (ex-kernels from apricots, peaches, cherries and ex-bitter almond) and semisynthetic (ex-cinnamaldehyde extracted from cinnamon). Other applications have also been published, including for raspberry ketone, heliotropine, etc.

==== ^{13}C-SNIF-NMR ====
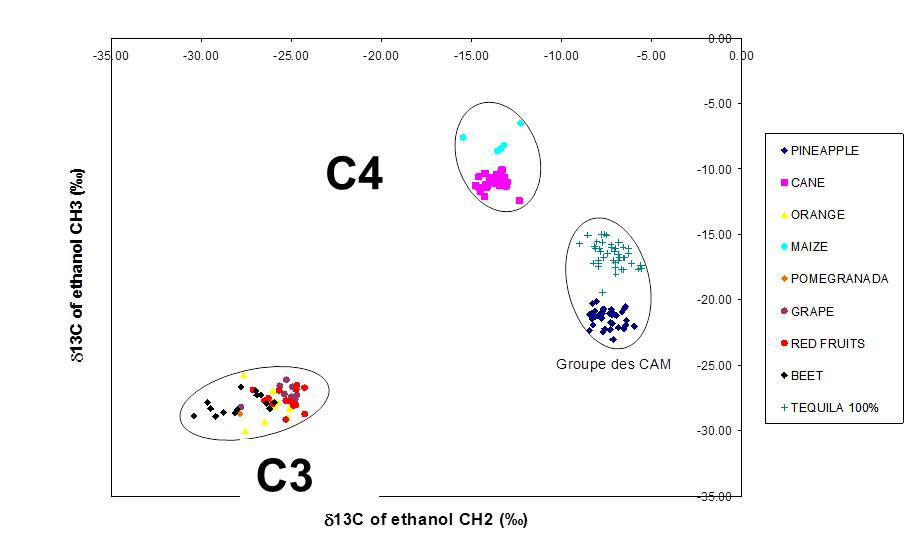
Use of ^{13}C-SNIF-NMR to distinguish between C3, C4, and CAM-types of plant metabolism; see text for explanation and citations.

Optimization of technique parameters has enabled reaching better accuracy for the ^{13}C NMR measurements.

The ^{13}C-SNIF-NMR method is called the "new frontier" because it is the first analytical method that can differentiate sugars coming from C4-metabolism plants (cane, maize, etc.) and some crassulacean acid metabolism plants (CAM-metabolism) like pineapple or agave.

This method can also be applied to tequila products, where it can differentiate authentic 100% agave tequila, misto tequila (made from at least 51% agave), and products made from a larger proportion of cane or maize sugar and therefore not complying with the legal definition of tequila.

== See also ==
- Nuclear magnetic resonance
- Food chemistry
- Food security
