= Mass-independent fractionation =

Type of process for separating isotopes

Mass-independent isotope fractionation or Non-mass-dependent fractionation (NMD), refers to any chemical or physical process that acts to separate isotopes, where the amount of separation does not scale in proportion with the difference in the masses of the isotopes. Most isotopic fractionations (including typical kinetic fractionations and equilibrium fractionations) are caused by the effects of the mass of an isotope on atomic or molecular velocities, diffusivities or bond strengths. Mass-independent fractionation processes are less common, occurring mainly in photochemical and spin-forbidden reactions. Observation of mass-independent fractionated materials can therefore be used to trace these types of reactions in nature and in laboratory experiments.

== Mass-independent fractionation in nature ==
The most notable examples of mass-independent fractionation in nature are found in the isotopes of oxygen and sulfur. The first example was discovered by Robert N. Clayton, Toshiko Mayeda, and Lawrence Grossman in 1973, in the oxygen isotopic composition of refractory calcium–aluminium-rich inclusions in the Allende meteorite. The inclusions, thought to be among the oldest solid materials in the Solar System, show a pattern of low ^{18}O/^{16}O and ^{17}O/^{16}O relative to samples from the Earth and Moon. Both ratios vary by the same amount in the inclusions, although the mass difference between ^{18}O and ^{16}O is almost twice as large as the difference between ^{17}O and ^{16}O. Originally this was interpreted as evidence of incomplete mixing of ^{16}O-rich material (created and distributed by a large star in a supernova) into the Solar nebula. However, recent measurement of the oxygen-isotope composition of the Solar wind, using samples collected by the Genesis spacecraft, shows that the most ^{16}O-rich inclusions are close to the bulk composition of the solar system. This implies that Earth, the Moon, Mars, and asteroids all formed from ^{18}O- and ^{17}O-enriched material. Photodissociation of carbon monoxide in the Solar nebula has been proposed to explain this isotope fractionation.

Mass-independent fractionation also has been observed in ozone. Large, 1:1 enrichments of ^{18}O/^{16}O and ^{17}O/^{16}O in ozone were discovered in laboratory synthesis experiments by Mark Thiemens and John Heidenreich in 1983, and later found in stratospheric air samples measured by Konrad Mauersberger. These enrichments were eventually traced to the three-body ozone formation reaction.

O + O_{2} → O_{3}* + M → O_{3} + M*

Theoretical calculations by Rudolph Marcus and others suggest that the enrichments are the result of a combination of mass-dependent and mass-independent kinetic isotope effects (KIE) involving the excited state O_{3}* intermediate related to some unusual symmetry properties. The mass-dependent isotope effect occurs in asymmetric species. It arises from the difference in zero-point energy of the two formation channels available (e.g., ^{18}O^{16}O + ^{16}O vs ^{18}O + ^{16}O^{16}O for formation of ^{18}O^{16}O^{16}O.) These mass-dependent zero-point energy effects cancel one another out and do not affect the enrichment in heavy isotopes observed in ozone. The mass-independent enrichment in ozone is still not fully understood, but may be due to isotopically symmetric O_{3}* having a shorter lifetime than asymmetric O_{3}*, thus not allowing a statistical distribution of energy throughout all the degrees of freedom, resulting in a mass-independent distribution of isotopes.

=== Mass-independent carbon dioxide fractionation ===
The mass-independent distribution of isotopes in stratospheric ozone can be transferred to carbon dioxide (CO_{2}). This anomalous isotopic composition in CO_{2} can be used to quantify gross primary production, the uptake of CO_{2} by vegetation through photosynthesis. This effect of terrestrial vegetation on the isotopic signature of atmospheric CO_{2} was simulated with a global model and confirmed experimentally.

=== Mass-independent sulfur fractionation ===
Mass independent fractionation of sulfur isotopes in achean sediments: strong evidence for an anoxic archean atmosphere.

Mass-independent fractionation of sulfur can be observed in ancient sediments, where it preserves a signal of the prevailing environmental conditions. The creation and transfer of the mass-independent signature into minerals would be unlikely in an atmosphere containing abundant oxygen, constraining the Great Oxygenation Event to some time after 2,450 million years ago. Before this time, the marine isotope stages (MIS) record implies that sulfate-reducing bacteria did not play a significant role in the global sulfur cycle, and that the MIS signal is due primarily to changes in volcanic activity.

=== Mass-independent mercury fractionation ===
To date, mass independent isotope fractionation effects have only been found in three elements. In 2007 MIF in the odd isotopes (199, 201) of mercury was reported for the first time associated with photochemical of aqueous mercury. A suite of studies rapidly established MIF-Hg, coupled with mass dependent isotope fractionation studies, as a novel approach for tracking biogeochemical pathways in the mercury cycle during atmospheric-aqueous exchange. Mechanistic studies are further probing the controls on MIF-Hg including both nuclear volume effects and magnetic isotopes effects and the variation of the photochemical magnetic isotope effect as a function of different ranges of UV spectrum.

== See also ==
- Equilibrium fractionation
- Kinetic fractionation
- Isotope geochemistry
