= Transient kinetic isotope fractionation =

Isotope separation by unusual processes

Transient kinetic isotope effects (or fractionation) occur when the reaction leading to isotope fractionation does not follow pure first-order kinetics (FOK) and therefore isotopic effects cannot be described with the classical equilibrium fractionation equations or with steady-state kinetic fractionation equations (also known as the Rayleigh equation). In these instances, the general equations for biochemical isotope kinetics (GEBIK) and the general equations for biochemical isotope fractionation (GEBIF) can be used.

The GEBIK and GEBIF equations are the most generalized approach to describe isotopic effects in any chemical, catalytic reaction and biochemical reactions because they can describe isotopic effects in equilibrium reactions, kinetic chemical reactions and kinetic biochemical reactions. In the latter two cases, they can describe both stationary and non-stationary fractionation (i.e., variable and inverse fractionation). In general, isotopic effects depend on the number of reactants and on the number of combinations resulting from the number of substitutions in all reactants and products. Describing with accuracy isotopic effects, however, depends also on the specific rate law used to describe the chemical or biochemical reaction that produces isotopic effects. Normally, regardless of whether a reaction is purely chemical or whether it involves some enzyme of biological nature, the equations used to describe isotopic effects base on FOK. This approach systematically leads to isotopic effects that can be described by means of the Rayleigh equation. In this case, isotopic effects will always be expressed as a constant, hence will not be able to describe isotopic effects in reactions where fractionation and enrichment are variable or inverse during the course of a reaction. Most chemical reactions do not follow FOK; neither biochemical reactions can normally be described with FOK. To properly describe isotopic effects in chemical or biochemical reactions, different approaches must be employed such as the use of Michaelis–Menten reaction order (for chemical reactions) or coupled Michaelis–Menten and Monod reaction orders (for biochemical reactions). However, conversely to Michaelis–Menten kinetics, GEBIK and GEBIF equations are solved under the hypothesis of non-steady state. This characteristic allows GEBIK and GEBIF to capture transient isotopic effects.

== Mathematical description of transient kinetic isotope effects ==
The GEBIK and GEBIF equations are introduced here below.

=== Notation ===
The GEBIK and GEBIF equations describe the dynamics of the following state variables

S
substrate concentration
P
product concentration
E
enzyme concentration
C
complex concentration
B
biomass concentration

Both S and P contain at least one isotopic expression of a tracer atom. For instance, if the carbon element is used as a tracer, both S and P contain at least one C atom, which may appear as $\ce{^{12}C}$ and $\ce{^{13}C}$. The isotopic expression within a molecule is

$$_a^b\ce{S}$$

where $_a$ is the number of tracer atoms within S, while $^b$ is the number of isotopic substitutions in the same molecule. The condition $0 \leq b \leq a$ must be satisfied. For example, the $\ce{N2}$ product in which 1 isotopic substitution occurs (e.g., $\ce{^{15}N^{14}N}$) will be described by $\ce{^1_2P}$.

Substrates and products appear in a chemical reaction with specific stoichiometric coefficients. When chemical reactions comprise combinations of reactants and products with various isotopic expressions, the stoichiometric coefficients are functions of the isotope substitution number. If $x_b$ and $y_d$ are the stoichiometric coefficient for $_a^b\ce{S}$ substrate and $_c^d\ce{P}$ product, a reaction takes the form

$$\sum_{b=0}^{a} x_b {}_{a}^{b}\ce{S ->} \sum_{d=0}^c y_d {}_c^d\ce{P}.$$

For example, in the reaction $\ce{{^{14}NO3^-} + ^{15}NO3^- -> {^{14}{N}}{^{15}{NO}}}$, the notation is $\ce{{^0_1S} + {^1_1S} -> {^1_2P}}$ with $x_0=x_1=1$ for both isotopologue reactants of the same substrate with substitution number $b=0$ and $b=1$, and with $y_1=1$ for $\ce{^1_2P}$ and $y_0=y_2=0$ because the reaction does not comprise production of $\ce{^0_2P = {^{14}N2O}}$ and $\ce{^2_2P = {^{15}N2O}}$.

For isotopomers, the substitution location is taken into account as $_a^b\ce{S}^\beta$ and $_a^b\ce{S}^\gamma$, where $\beta$ and $\gamma$ indicate a different expressions of the same isotopologue $_a^b\ce{S}$. Isotopomers only exist when $1 \leq b <a$ and $a \ge 2$. The substitution location has to be specifically defined depending on the number of tracer atoms a, number of substitutions b, and molecule structure. For multiatomic molecules that are symmetric with respect to tracer position, there is no need to specify the substitution position when $b=1$. For example, one substitution of deuterium $\ce{D\ =\ {^2H}}$ (Note: IUPAC recommends that the symbol for deuterium should be ^{2}H, rather than D.) in the symmetric methane molecule $\ce{CDH3}$ does not require the use of the right superscript. In the case that $b=2$, the substitution location has to be specified, while for $\ce{CHD3}$ and $\ce{CD4}$ it is not required. For example, two ^{2}H substitutions in $\ce{CD2H2}$ can occur in adjacent or non-adjacent locations. Using this notation, the reaction $\ce{{CD2H2} + {2O2} -> {H2O} + {D2O} + {CO2},}$ can be written as

$$\ce{{^2_4S}^{\beta} -> {^0_2P} + {^2_2P}}$$

where $\beta$ in $\ce{{^2_4S}^{\beta}}$ defines only one of the two methane forms (either with adjacent or non-adjacent D atoms). The location of D in the two isotopologue water molecules produced on the right-hand side of the reaction has not been indicated because D is present in only one water molecule at saturation, and because the water molecule is symmetric. For asymmetric and multiatomic molecules with $1\le b<a$ and $a \ge 2$, definition of the substitution location is always required. For instance, the isotopomers of the (asymmetric) nitrous oxide molecule $\ce{N2O}$ are $\ce{^1_2S^\beta= {^{15}N}{^{14}NO}}$ and $\ce{^1_2S^\gamma= {^{14}N}{^{15}NO}}$.

Reactions of asymmetric isotopomers can be written using the partitioning coefficient u as

$$\sum_{b=0}^{a} \sum_{\beta}  x_b \ {_{a}^{b}}\ce{S}^{\beta} \ce{->} \sum_{d=0}^c \sum_{\gamma} u_{\gamma}  y_d \ {_c^d}\ce{P}^{\gamma},$$

where $u_{\gamma}=1$. For example, using N isotope tracers, the isotopomer reactions

$$\ce{{^{14}NO3^-} + {^{15}NO3^-} -> {^{14}N}{^{15}NO},}$$
$$\ce{{^{14}NO3^-} + {^{15}NO3^-} -> {^{15}N}{^{14}NO},}$$

can be written as one reaction in which each isotopomer product is multiplied by its partition coefficient as

$$\ce{{^0_1S} + {^1_1S} -> \mathit{u}_\beta {^1_2P}^\beta + \mathit{u}_\gamma {^1_2P}^\gamma,}$$

with $u_\gamma=1-u_\beta$. More generally, the tracer element does not necessarily occur in only one substrate and one product. If $n_\ce{S}$ substrates react releasing $n_\ce{P}$ products, each having an isotopic expression of the tracer element, then the generalized reaction notation is

$\sum_{j=1}^{n_S} \sum_{b_j=0}^{a_j} \sum_{ \beta_j } x_{b_j} \ {_{a_j}^{b_j}}\ce{S}_j^{\beta_j} \ce{->} \sum_{h=1}^{n_P} \sum_{ d_h=0 }^{c_h} \sum_{ \gamma_h } u_{\gamma_h} \ y_{d_h} \ {_{c_h}^{d_h}}\ce{P}_h^{\gamma_h}.$	1

For instance, consider the $\ce{^{16}O}$ and $\ce{^{18}O}$ tracers in the reaction

$$\ce{{CH2^{18}O}+{^{16}O2} -> {H2^{16}O} + C^{18}O^{16}O}$$

In this case the reaction can be written as

$$\ce{{^1_1S1} + {^0_2S2} -> {^0_1P1} + {^1_2P2}}$$

with two substrates and two products without indication of the substitution location because all molecules are symmetric.

Biochemical kinetic reactions of type (1) are often catalytic reactions in which one or more substrates, $\ce{S}_j$, bind to an enzyme, E, to form a reversible activated complex, C, which releases one or more products, $\ce{P}_h$, and free, unchanged enzyme. These reactions belong to the type of reactions that can be described by Michaelis–Menten kinetics. Using this approach for substrate and product isotopologue and isotopomer expressions, and under the prescribed stoichiometric relationships among them, leads to the general reactions of the Michaelis–Menten type

$\sum_{j=1}^{n_\ce{S}} \sum_{b_{ji}=0}^{a_{ji}} \sum_{ \beta_{ji} } x_{b_{ji}}\ {_{a_j}^{b_{ji}}}\ce{S}_j^{\beta_{ji}} + \ce{E <=>[{k}_{1(i)}][{k}_{2(i)}]} \ce{C}_i \ce{->[{k}_{3(i)}]} \sum_{h=1}^{n_\ce{P}} \sum_{ d_{hi}=0 }^{c_{hi}} \sum_{ \gamma_{hi} } u_{\gamma_{hi}} y_{d_{hi}} \ {_{c_h}^{d_{hi}}}\ce{P}_h^{\gamma_{hi}} + \ce{E}$	2

with the index $i=1,...,m$, where m depends on the number of possible atomic combinations among all isotopologues and isotopomers. Here, $k_{1(i)}$, $k_{2(i)}$, and $k_{3(i)}$ are the rate constants indexed for each of the m reactions.

==== Example ====
The reactions

$$\ce{2 ^{14}NO3^- -> {^{14}N2O}}$$
$$\ce{{^{14}NO3^-} + {^{15}NO3^-} -> {^{14}N}{^{15}NO}}$$
$$\ce{{^{14}NO3^-} + {^{15}NO3^-} -> {^{15}N}{^{14}NO}}$$
$$\ce{2 ^{15}NO3^- -> {^{15}N2O}}$$

can be written as

$$\ce{{2 ^0_1S} + {E} <=>[{k}_{1(1)}][{k}_{2(1)}] {C1} ->[{k}_{3(1)}] {^0_2P} + {E}}$$
$$\ce{{^0_1S} + {^1_1S} + {E} <=>[{k}_{1(2)}][{k}_{2(2)}] {C2} ->[{k}_{3(2)}] \mathit{u}_\beta {^1_2P}^\beta + \mathit{u}_\gamma{^1_2P}^\gamma + {E}}$$
$$\ce{{2 ^1_1S} + {E} <=>[{k}_{1(3)}][{k}_{2(3)}] {C3} ->[{k}_{3(3)}] {^2_2P} + {E}}$$

=== Isotope mass balance ===
The following isotope mass balances must hold

$$\sum_{j=1}^{n_S} \sum_{b_j=0}^{a_j} \sum_{ \beta_j } x_{b_j} \ a_j = \sum_{h=1}^{n_P} \sum_{ d_h=0 }^{c_h} \sum_{  \gamma_h } u_{\gamma_h} \ y_{d_h} \ c_h,$$
$$\sum_{j=1}^{n_S} \sum_{b_j=0}^{a_j} \sum_{ \beta_j } x_{b_j} \ b_j = \sum_{h=1}^{n_P} \sum_{ d_h=0 }^{c_h} \sum_{ \gamma_h } u_{\gamma_h} \ y_{d_h} \ d_{h}.$$

=== General equations for biochemical isotope kinetics (GEBIK) ===
To solve for the concentration of all components appearing in any general biochemical reaction as in (2), the Michaelis–Menten kinetics for an enzymatic reaction are coupled with the Monod kinetics for biomass dynamics. The most general case is to assume that the enzyme concentration is proportional to the biomass concentration and that the reaction is not in quasi-steady state. These hypotheses lead to the following system of equations

$\frac{\ce{d}[{^{b_j}_{a_j}}\ce S^{\beta_j}_j]}{\ce{d}t} = \sum_i x_{b_{ji}} [{k}_{2(i)} C_i -{k}_{1(i)} {E \overline{S}}_i]$	3a

$\frac{\ce{d}C_i}{\ce{d}t} = {k}_{1(i)} {E\overline{S}}_i - [{k}_{2(i)} + {k}_{3(i)}] C_i$	3b

$\frac{\ce{d}[{^{d_h}_{c_h}}\ce P^{\gamma_h}_h]}{\ce{d}t} = \sum_i u_{\gamma_{hi}} y_{d_{hi}} {k}_{3(i)} C_i$	3c

$\frac{ \ce{d} E }{ \ce{d}t } = z \frac{\ce{d} B}{\ce{d}t} -\sum_i \frac{\ce{d} C_i}{\ce{d}t}$	3d

$\frac{ \ce{d} B }{ \ce{d}t } = Y \sum_h \sum_{d_h} \sum_{\gamma_h} \frac{\ce{d}[{^{d_h}_{c_h}}\ce P^{\gamma_h}_h]}{\ce{d}t} - \mu B$	3e

with $i=1,...,m$, and where $\overline{S}_i$ is the concentration of the most limiting substrate in each reaction i, z is the enzyme yield coefficient, Y is the yield coefficient expressing the biomass gain per unit of released product and $\mu$ is the biomass mortality rate.

=== General equations for biochemical isotope fractionation (GEBIF) ===
The isotopic composition of the components in a biochemical system can be defined in different ways depending on the definition of isotopic ratio. Three definitions are described here:

==== Isotopic ratio – definition 1 ====
Isotopic ratio relative to each component in the system, each with its isotopic expression, with respect to the concentration of its most abundant isotopologue

$$R^{**}_{S_{b_j,\beta_j}}(t)= \frac{{^{b_j}_{a_j}}S^{\beta_j}_j (t)}{^0_{a_j}S_j(t)}$$

$$R^{**}_{P_{d_h,\gamma_h}}(t)= \frac{{^{d_h}_{c_h}}P^{\gamma_h}_h(t)}{^0_{c_h}P_h(t)}$$

==== Isotopic ratio – definition 2 ====
Isotopic ratio relative to the mass of the tracer element in each component;

$$R^*_{S_j}(t)= \frac{ \displaystyle  \sum_{b_j\neq0} \sum_{\beta_j} \frac{b_j q}{ ^{b_j}M_{S_j}} \ {^{b_j}_{a_j}}S^{\beta_j}_j (t)} { \displaystyle \sum_{b_j\neq
a_j} \sum_{\beta_j} \frac{(a_j-b_j) p}{^{b_j}M_{S_j}} \ {^{b_j}_{a_j}}S^{\beta_j}_j (t)
}$$

$$R^*_{P_h}(t)= \frac{ \displaystyle  \sum_{d_h\neq 0} \sum_{\gamma_h} \frac{d_h q}{^{d_h}M_{P_h}} \ {^{d_h}_{c_h}}P^{\gamma_h}_h (t) }{ \displaystyle  \sum_{d_h\neq
c_h} \sum_{\gamma_h} \frac{(c_h-d_h) p }{^{d_h}M_{P_h}} \ {^{d_h}_{c_h}}P^{\gamma_h}_h (t) }$$

where, $^{b_j}M_{S_j}$ and $^{d_h}M_{P_h}$ are the molecular weight of each isotopic expression of the substrate and product.

==== Isotopic ratio – definition 3 ====
Isotopic ratio relative to the mass of the tracer element in the accumulated substrates and products

$$R_{S}(t)= \frac{\displaystyle \sum_j \sum_{b_j\neq0} \sum_{\beta_j} \frac{b_j q}{ ^{b_j}M_{S_j}} \ {^{b_j}_{a_j}}S^{\beta_j}_j (t)} { \displaystyle\sum_j
\sum_{b_j\neq a_j} \sum_{\beta_j} \frac{(a_j-b_j) p}{^{b_j}M_{S_j}} \ {^{b_j}_{a_j}}S^{\beta_j}_j (t) },$$

$$R_{P}(t)= \frac{ \displaystyle\sum_h \sum_{d_h\neq 0} \sum_{\gamma_h} \frac{d_h q}{^{d_h}M_{P_h}} \ {^{d_h}_{c_h}}P^{\gamma_h}_h (t)  }{ \displaystyle \sum_h
\sum_{d_h\neq c_h} \sum_{\gamma_h} \frac{(c_h-d_h) p }{^{d_h}M_{P_h}} \ {^{d_h}_{c_h}}P^{\gamma_h}_h (t) }.$$

==== Isotopic composition ====
Regardless of the definition of the isotopic ratio, the isotopic composition of substrate and product are expressed as

$\delta_{S}(t)=\left( \frac{R_{S}(t)}{R_{std}}-1 \right) 1000$,	4a

$\delta_{P}(t)= \left( \frac{R_{P}(t)}{R_{std}} -1 \right) 1000$.	4a

where $R_{std}$ is a standard isotopic ration. Here, definition 3 of isotopic ratio has been used, however, any of the three definitions of isotopic ratio can equally be used.

==== Fractionation factor ====
The isotopic ratio of the product can be used to define the instantaneous isotopic ratio

$\ce{IR}_\ce{P}(t)= \cfrac{ \displaystyle\sum_h \sum_{d_h\neq 0} \sum_{\gamma_h} \cfrac{d_h q}{^{d_h}M_{\ce P_h}} \ \cfrac{\ce{d} [{^{d_h}_{c_h}}\ce P^{\gamma_h}_h (t)] }{\ce{d} t} }{\displaystyle \sum_h \sum_{d_h\neq c_h} \sum_{\gamma_h} \cfrac{(c_h-d_h) p }{^{d_h}M_{\ce P_h}} \ \cfrac{\ce{d} [{^{d_h}_{c_h}}\ce P^{\gamma_h}_h (t)] }{\ce{d} t} }$	5

and the time-dependent fractionation factor

$\alpha(t)=\frac{\ce{IR}_\ce{P}(t)}{R_\ce{S}(t)}$	6

==== Isotopic enrichment ====
The time-dependent isotopic enrichment is simply defined as

$\epsilon(t)=1- \alpha(t)$	7

== Simplified forms of GEBIK and GEBIF ==
Under specific assumptions, the GEBIK and GEBIF equations become equivalent to the equation for steady-state kinetic isotope fractionation in both chemical and biochemical reactions. Here two mathematical treatments are proposed: (i) under biomass-free and enzyme-invariant (BFEI) hypothesis and (ii) under quasi-steady-state (QSS) hypothesis.

=== BFEI hypothesis ===
In instances where the biomass and enzyme concentrations are not appreciably changing in time, we can assume that biomass dynamics is negligible and that the total enzyme concentration is constant, and the GEBIK equations become

$\frac{\ce{d}[{^{b_j}_{a_j}}\ce S^{\beta_j}_j]}{\ce{d}t} = \sum_i x_{b_{ji}} [{k}_{2(i)} C_i -{k}_{1(i)} {E \overline{S}}_i]$	8a

$\frac{\ce{d}C_i}{\ce{d}t} = {k}_{1(i)} {E \overline{S}}_i - [{k}_{2(i)} + {k}_{3(i)}] C_i$	8b

$\frac{\ce{d}[{^{d_h}_{c_h}}\ce P^{\gamma_h}_h]}{\ce{d}t} = \sum_i u_{\gamma_{hi}} y_{d_{hi}} {k}_{3(i)} \ce C_i$	8c

$\frac{ \ce{d} E }{ \ce{d}t } = - \sum_i \frac{\ce{d} C_i}{\ce{d}t}$	8d

Eqs. (4) for isotopic compositions, Eq. (6) for the fractionation factor and Eq. (7) for the enrichment factor equally applies to the GEBIK equations under the BFEI hypothesis.

=== QSS hypothesis ===
If the quasi-steady-state hypothesis is assumed in addition to BFEI hypothesis, then the complex concentration can be assumed to be in a stationary (steady) state according to the Briggs–Haldane hypothesis, and the GEBIK equations become

$\frac{ \ce{d} [{_{a_j}^{b_{j}}}\ce S_j^{\beta_{j}} ] }{ \ce{d}t } \simeq - \sum_{i=1}^m \frac{ x_{b_{ji}} {k}_{3(i)} E_0 \overline{S}_i }{ \overline{S}_i + K_i \left( 1+ \displaystyle\sum_{p\neq i} \dfrac{\overline{S}_p}{K_p} \right) }$	9a

$\frac{\ce{d} [{^{d_h}_{c_h}}\ce P^{\gamma_h}_h ]}{\ce{d}t} \simeq \sum_{i=1}^m \frac{ u_{\gamma_{hi}} y_{d_{hi}} {k}_{3(i)} E_0 \overline{S}_i }{ \overline{S}_i + K_i \left( 1+ \displaystyle\sum_{p\neq i} \dfrac{\overline{S}_p}{K_p} \right) }$	9a

which are written in a form similar to the classical Micaelis-Menten equations for any substrate and product. Here, the equations also show that the various isotopologue and isotopomer substrates appear as competing species. Eqs. (4) for isotopic compositions, Eq. (6) for the fractionation factor and Eq. (7) for the enrichment factor equally applies to the GEBIK equations under the BFEI and QSS hypothesis.

== Example of application of GEBIK and GEBIF ==
An example is shown where GEBIK and GEBIF equations are used to describe the isotopic reactions of $\ce{N2O}$ consumption into $\ce{N2}$ according to the simultaneous set of reactions

$$\ce{^{14}N2O -> {^{14}N2},}$$
$$\ce{{^{14}N}{^{15}NO} -> {^{14}N}{^{15}N},}$$
$$\ce{{^{15}N}{^{14}NO} -> {^{14}N}{^{15}N},}$$

These can be rewritten using the notation introduced before as.

$$\ce{{^0_2S} + {E} <=>[{k}_{2(1)}][{k}_{1(1)}] C1 ->[{k}_{3(1)}] {^0_2P} + {E},}$$
$$\ce{{^1_2S}^\beta  + {E} <=>[{k}_{2(2)}][{k}_{1(2)}] C2 ->[{k}_{3(2)}] {^1_2P} + {E},}$$
$$\ce{{^1_2S}^\gamma  + {E} <=>[{k}_{2(3)}][{k}_{1(3)}] C3 ->[{k}_{3(3)}] {^1_2P} + {E},}$$

The substrate $\ce{^2_2S\ =\ {^{15}N2O}}$ has not been included due to its scarcity. In addition, we have not specified the isotopic substitution in the $\ce{N2}$ product of the second and third reactions because $\ce{N2}$ is symmetric. Assuming that the second and third reactions have identical reaction rates $(k_{1(3)}\equiv k_{1(2)}$, $k_{2(3)}\equiv k_{2(2)}$, and $k_{3(3)}\equiv k_{3(2)})$, the full GEBIK and GEBIF equations are

$$\frac{\ce{d} [\ce{^0_2S}]}{\ce{d}t} =    {k}_{2(1)} \ce{C1} -{k}_{1(1)}  \ce{^0_2S E}$$

$$\frac{\ce{d} [\ce{^1_2S^\beta}]}{\ce{d}t} = {k}_{2(2)} \ce{C2} -{k}_{1(2)} \ce{^1_2S^\beta E}$$

$$\frac{\ce{d} [\ce{^1_2S^\gamma}]}{\ce{d}t}= {k}_{2(2)} \ce{C3} -{k}_{1(2)} \ce{^1_2S^\gamma E}$$

$$\frac{\ce{d}\ce{C1}}{\ce{d}t} = {k}_{1(1)} \ce{^0_2S E} - ({k}_{2(1)} + {k}_{3(1)}) \ce{C1}$$

$$\frac{\ce{d}\ce{C2}}{\ce{d}t}=  {k}_{1(2)} \ce{^1_2S^\beta E} - ({k}_{2(2)}+ {k}_{3(2)}) \ce{C2}$$

$$\frac{\ce{d}\ce{C3}}{\ce{d}t}=  {k}_{1(2)} \ce{^1_2S^\gamma E} - ({k}_{2(2)}+ {k}_{3(2)}) \ce{C3}$$

$$\frac{\ce{d} [\ce{^0_2P}]}{\ce{d}t} =  {k}_{3(1)} \ce{C1}$$

$$\frac{\ce{d} [\ce{^1_2P}]}{\ce{d}t} =  {k}_{3(2)} (\ce{C2} + \ce{C3})$$

$$\frac{ \ce{d}\ce E }{ \ce{d}t } =  z \frac{\ce{d}B}{\ce{d}t} -  \frac{\ce{d}\ce{C1}}{\ce{d}t} -  \frac{\ce{d}\ce{C2}}{\ce{d}t} -  \frac{\ce{d}\ce{C3}}{\ce{d}t}$$

$$\frac{ \ce{d}B }{ \ce{d}t } = Y \left( \frac{\ce{d} [\ce{^0_2P}]}{\ce{d}t} + \frac{\ce{d} [\ce{^1_2P}]}{\ce{d}t} \right) - \mu B$$

$$R_P(t) = \frac{ 15 \ \ce{^1_2P}(t)  }{ 14 \ \ce{^1_2P}(t)  + 29 \ \ce{^0_2P}(t) }$$

$$\ce{IR_P}(t)  = \dfrac{ 15 \ (\ce{C2} + \ce{C3}) {k}_{3(2)} } {  29 \ \ce{C1} {k}_{3(1)} + 14 \ (\ce{C2} + \ce{C3}) {k}_{3(2)}  },$$

$$R_{S}(t) =  \frac{ 165 \ \ce{^1_2S} }{ 154 \ \ce{^1_2S} + 315 \ \ce{^0_2S}  }$$

$$\alpha(t) = \frac{ 7 \ (\ce{C2} + \ce{C3}) {k}_{3(2)} [45 \ \ce{^0_2S} + 22 \ \ce{^1_2S}] } { 11 \ [29 \ \ce{C1} {k}_{3(1)} + 14 \  (\ce{C2} + \ce{C3}) {k}_{3(2)} ] \ {_2^1}\ce S }$$

== Example of application of GEBIK and GEBIF under BFEI and QSS hypotheses ==
The same reaction can be described with the GEBIK and GEBIF equations under the BFEI and QSS approximations as

$$\frac{\ce{d}[{^0_2}\ce S]}{\ce{d}t} \simeq - \frac{{k}_{3(1)} E_0 {^0_2}\ce S  }{ ^0_2\ce S + \ce{K1}  \left( 1+    \dfrac{{^1_2}\ce S^\beta }{ \ce{K2}}    +   \dfrac{ {^1_2}\ce S^\gamma }{ \ce{K2}}   \right)}$$

$$\frac{\ce{d}[{^1_2}\ce S^\beta]}{\ce{d}t} \simeq - \frac{ {k}_{3(2)} E_0 {^1_2}\ce S^\beta  }{ ^1_2\ce S^\beta + \ce{K2}  \left( 1+  \dfrac{ {^0_2}\ce S  }{  \ce{K1}}  +  \dfrac{ {^1_2}\ce S^\gamma  }{ \ce{K2}}  \right) }$$

$$\frac{\ce{d}[{^1_2}\ce S^\gamma]}{\ce{d}t} \simeq - \frac{ {k}_{3(2)} E_0 {^1_2}\ce S^\gamma  }{ ^1_2\ce S^\gamma + \ce{K2}  \left( 1+  \dfrac{ {^0_2}\ce S  }{\ce{K1}} + \dfrac{ {^1_2}\ce S^\beta  }{  \ce{K2}}  \right) }$$

$$\frac{\ce{d } {_2^0}\ce P}{\ce{d}t} = - \frac{\ce{d}[{^0_2}\ce S]}{\ce{d}t}$$

$$\frac{\ce{d } {_2^1}\ce P}{\ce{d}t} = - \frac{\ce{d}[{^1_2}\ce S^\beta]}{\ce{d}t} - \frac{\ce{d}[{^1_2}\ce S^\gamma]}{\ce{d}t}$$

$$R_P(t) = \frac{ 15  {_2^1}\ce P  }{ 14  {_2^1}\ce P  + 29 \ {_2^0}\ce P }$$

$$\ce{IR_P}(t)  = \dfrac{ 15 \ce{K1} {k}_{3(2)} {_2^1}\ce S  }{ 29 \ce{K2} {k}_{3(1)} {_2^0}\ce S + 14 \ce{K1} {k}_{3(2)} {_2^1}\ce S }$$

$$R_{S}(t) =  \frac{ 465 \ {_2^1}\ce S }{ 14 [63 \ {_2^0}\ce S + 31 \ {_2^1}\ce S]  }$$

$$\alpha(t) = \frac{ 14 \ce{K1} {k}_{3(2)} [63 \ {_2^0}\ce S + 31 \ {_2^1}\ce S] }{ 31 [29 \ce{K2} {k}_{3(1)} \ {_2^0}\ce S + 14 \ce{K1} {k}_{3(2)} \ {_2^0}\ce S ] }$$

where $\ce{K3}$ has been substituted with $\ce{K2}$ because the rate constants in the third reaction have been assumed to equal those of the second reaction.

== See also ==
- Equilibrium fractionation
- Isotope electrochemistry
