= Methane clumped isotopes =

Methane molecules that contain two or more rare isotopes

Methane clumped isotopes are methane molecules that contain two or more rare isotopes. Methane (CH_{4}) contains two elements, carbon and hydrogen, each of which has two stable isotopes. For carbon, 98.9% are in the form of carbon-12 (^{12}C) and 1.1% are carbon-13 (^{13}C); while for hydrogen, 99.99% are in the form of protium (^{1}H) and 0.01% are deuterium (^{2}H or D). Carbon-13 (^{13}C) and deuterium (^{2}H or D) are rare isotopes in methane molecules. The abundance of the clumped isotopes provides information independent from the traditional carbon or hydrogen isotope composition of methane molecules.

== Introduction ==
Isotopologues are molecules that have the same chemical composition, but differ only in their isotopic composition. Methane has ten stable isotopologues: ^{12}CH_{4}, ^{13}CH_{4}, ^{12}CH_{3}D, ^{13}CH_{3}D, ^{12}CH_{2}D_{2}, ^{13}CH_{2}D_{2}, ^{12}CHD_{3}, ^{13}CHD_{3}, ^{12}CD_{4} and ^{13}CD_{4}, among which, ^{12}CH_{4} is an unsubstituted isotopologue; ^{13}CH_{4} and ^{12}CH_{3}D are singly substituted isotopologues; ^{13}CH_{3}D and ^{12}CH_{2}D_{2} are doubly substituted isotopologues. The multiple-substituted isotopologues are clumped isotopologues.

The absolute abundance of each isotopologue primarily depends on the traditional carbon and hydrogen isotope compositions (δ^{13}C and δD) of the molecules. Clumped isotope composition is calculated relative to the random distribution of carbon and hydrogen isotopes in the methane molecules. The deviations from the random distribution is the key signature of methane clumped isotope (please see "notation" for details).

In thermodynamic equilibrium, methane clumped isotopologue composition has a monotonic relationship with formation temperature. This is the condition for many geological environments so that methane clumped isotope can record its formation temperature, and therefore can be used to identify the origins of methane. When methane clumped-isotope composition is controlled by kinetic effects, for example, for microbial methane, it has the potential to be used to study metabolism.

The study of methane clumped isotopologues is very recent. The first mass spectrometry measurement of methane clumped isotopologues of natural abundance was made in 2014. This is a very young and fast-growing field.

Abundances of isotopologues of methane
Isotopologue	Type of Isotopologue	Abundance
^{12}CH_{4}	Unsubstituted isotopologue	98.88%
^{13}CH_{4}	Singly substituted isotopologue	1.07%
^{12}CH_{3}D	Singly substituted isotopologue	0.045%
^{13}CH_{3}D	Doubly substituted isotopologue	0.000492%
^{12}CH_{2}D_{2}	Doubly substituted isotopologue	7.848×10^{−6}%
^{13}CH_{2}D_{2}	Triply substituted isotopologue	8.488×10^{−8}%
^{12}CHD_{3}	Triply substituted isotopologue	6.018×10^{−10}%
^{13}CHD_{3}	Quadruply substituted isotopologue	6.509×10^{−12}%
^{12}CD_{4}	Quadruply substituted isotopologue	1.73×10^{−14}%
^{13}CD_{4}	Fully substituted isotopologue	1.871×10^{−16}%

Assuming isotopes are randomly distributed throughout all isotopologues and isotopes are of natural abundance.

== Notation ==
=== Δ notation ===
The Δ notation of clumped isotopes is an analogue to δ notation of traditional isotopes (e.g. δ^{13}C, δ^{18}O, δ^{15}N, δ^{34}S and δD).

The notation of traditional isotopes are defined as:

$\delta=(\left ( \frac{R_{sample}}{R_{reference}} \right )-1)\times1000$‰

$R_{sample}$ is the ratio of the rare isotope to the abundant isotope in the sample. $R_{reference}$ is the same ratio in the reference material. Because the variation of $R_{sample}$ is rather small, in the convenience of comparison between difference samples, the notation is define as a ratio minus 1 and expressed in permil (‰).

The Δ notation is inherited from traditional δ notation. But the reference is not a physical reference material. Instead, the reference frame is defined as the stochastic distribution of isotopologues in the sample. It means the values of Δ are to denote the excess or deficit of the isotopologue relative to the amount expected if a material conforms to the stochastic distribution.

The calculation of stochastic distribution of methane isotopologues:

$^{^{13}CH_3D}R^*= 4\times{^2R}\times{^{13}R}$

$^{^{12}CH_2D_2}R^*= 6\times{^2R}^2$

where $^{^{13}CH_3D}R^*$ is defined as the abundance of ^{13}CH_{3}D molecules relative to ^{12}CH_{4} molecules in random distribution; $^{^{12}CH_2D_2}R^*$ is defined as the abundance of ^{12}CH_{2}D_{2} molecules relative to ^{12}CH_{4} molecules in random distribution; ${^2R}=\frac{[D]}{[H]}$ calculates the abundance of deuterium relative to protium in all methane molecules; ${^{13}R}=\frac{[^{13}C]}{[^{12}C]}$ calculates the abundance of carbon-13 relative to carbon-12 in all methane molecules.

For the random distribution (i.e. probability distribution), the probability of choosing a carbon-13 atom over a carbon-12 atom is ${^{13}R}$; the probability of choosing three protium atoms and one deuterium atom over four protium atoms is$\binom 41 \times{^2R}$ (see "Combination") . Therefore, the probability of the occurrence of a ^{13}CH_{3}D molecule relative to the occurrence of a ^{12}CH_{4} molecule is the product of ${^{13}R}$ and $4\times{^2R}$, which gets to $^{^{13}CH_3D}R^*= 4\times{^2R}\times{^{13}R}$. Similarly, the probability of choosing two protium atoms and two deuterium atoms over four protium atoms is $\binom 42\times{^2R}^2$. Therefore, the probability of the occurrence of a ^{12}CH_{2}D_{2} molecule relative to the occurrence of a ^{12}CH_{4} molecule is $\binom 42\times{^2R}^2$, which gets to $^{^{12}CH_2D_2}R^*= 6\times{^2R}^2$.

The calculation of deviation from the random distribution:

$\Delta_{^{13}CH_3D}=\left ( \frac{^{^{13}CH_3D}R}{^{^{13}CH_3D}R^*} \right )-1$

$\Delta_{{}^{12}CH_2D_2}=\left ( \frac{^{^{12}CH_2D_2}R}{^{^{12}CH_2D_2}R^*} \right )-1$

where the actual abundance of ^{13}CH_{3}D molecules relative to ^{12}CH_{4} molecules, and the actual abundance of ^{12}CH_{2}D_{2} molecules relative to ^{12}CH_{4} molecules are calculated as follows:

$^{^{13}CH_3D}R= \frac{[^{13}CH_3D]}{[^{12}CH_4]}$

$^{^{12}CH_2D_2}R= \frac{[^{12}CH_2D_2]}{[^{12}CH_4]}$

The two Δ formulas are frequently used to report the abundance of clumped isotopologues of methane.

The reason for choosing stochastic distribution as the reference frame may be historical - in the process of developing CO_{2} clumped isotope measurement, the only material with known clumped isotope abundance was CO_{2} heated to 1000 °C. However, this reference frame is a good choice. Because the absolute abundance of each isotopologue primarily depends on the bulk carbon and hydrogen isotope compositions (δ^{13}C and δD) of the molecules, i.e. very close to stochastic distribution. Therefore, the deviation from the stochastic distribution, which is the key information embedded in the methane clumped isotopologues, is denoted by Δ values.

=== Mass-18 notation ===
Under some circumstances, the abundances of ^{13}CH_{3}D and ^{12}CH_{2}D_{2} isotopologues are only measured as a sum, which leads to the notation for isotopologues of mass-18 (i.e. ^{13}CH_{3}D and ^{12}CH_{2}D_{2}):

$^{18}R= ^{^{13}CH_3D}R+^{^{12}CH_2D_2}R=\frac{[^{13}CH_3D]+[^{12}CH_2D_2]}{[^{12}CH_4]}$

$\Delta_{18}=\left ( \frac{^{18}R}{^{18}R^*} \right )-1$

Note that $\Delta_{18}$ is not just the sum of $\Delta_{^{13}CH_3D}$ and $\Delta_{{}^{12}CH_2D_2}$.

=== Inferred equilibration temperature ===
$T_{18}$ is the inferred equilibration temperature based on $\Delta_{18}$ values; $T_{^{13}CH_3D}$ is the inferred equilibration temperature based on $\Delta_{^{13}CH_3D}$ values; and $T_{^{12}CH_2D_2}$ is the inferred equilibration temperature based on $\Delta_{^{12}CH_2D_2}$ values (see "Equilibrium thermodynamics" for details). $T_{18}$, $T_{^{13}CH_3D}$, and $T_{^{12}CH_2D_2}$ are also called clumped-isotope temperatures. When a Δ value is smaller than zero, there is no inferred equilibration temperature associated with it. Because at any finite temperature, the equilibrium Δ value is always positive.

== Physical chemistry ==
=== Equilibrium thermodynamics ===
When formed or re-equilibrated in reversible reactions, methane molecules can exchange isotopes with each other or with other substances present, such as H_{2}O, H_{2} and CO_{2}, and reach internal isotopic equilibrium. As a result, clumped isotopologues are enriched relative to the stochastic distribution. $\Delta_{18}$ and $\Delta_{^{13}CH_3D}$ values of methane in internal isotopic equilibrium are predicted and verified to vary as monotonic functions of temperature of equilibration as follows:

$\Delta_{18}=-0.0117{\left ( \frac{10^6}{T^2} \right )}^2+0.708\left ( \frac{10^6}{T^2} \right )-0.337$

$\Delta_{^{13}CH_3D}=-0.0141{\left ( \frac{10^6}{T^2} \right )}^2+0.699\left ( \frac{10^6}{T^2} \right )-0.311$

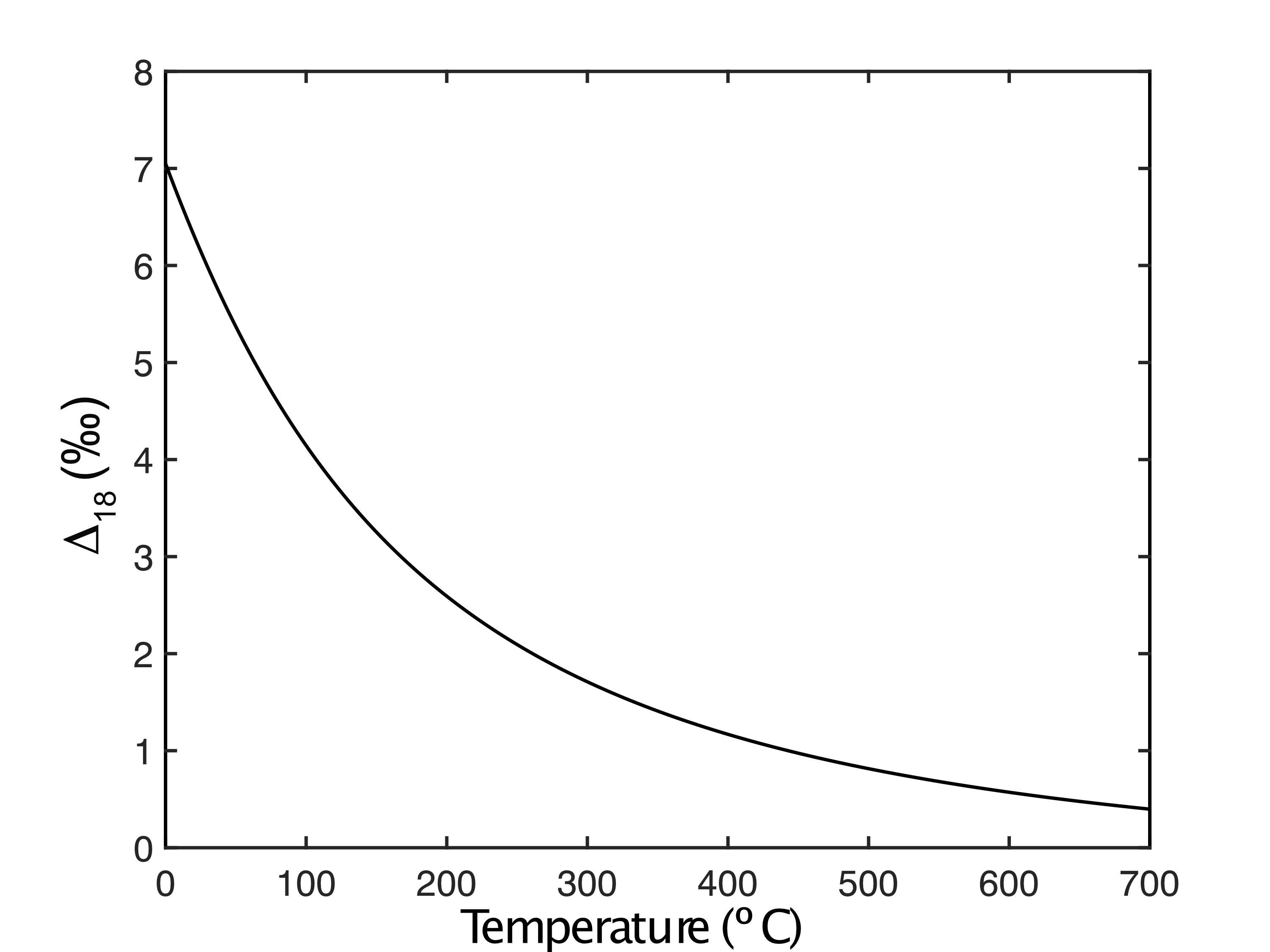
The equilibrium distribution of Δ_{18} as a monotonic function of temperature. Redrawn from Stolper et al., 2014.

Δ values are in permil (‰).

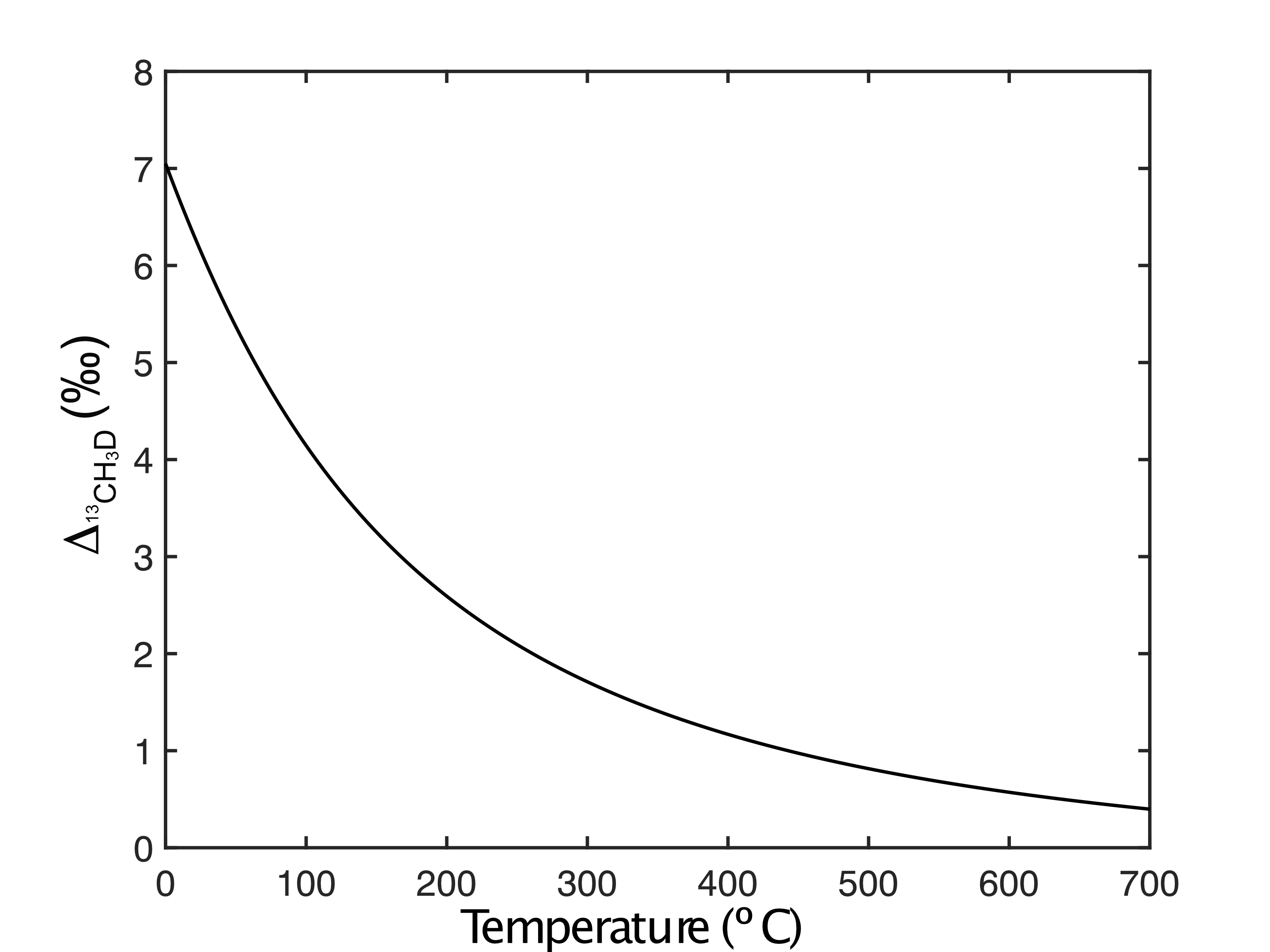
The equilibrium distribution of Δ13CH3D as a monotonic function of temperature. Redrawn from Webb and Miller, 2014.

Similar relationship also applies to $\Delta_{^{12}CH_2D_2}$:

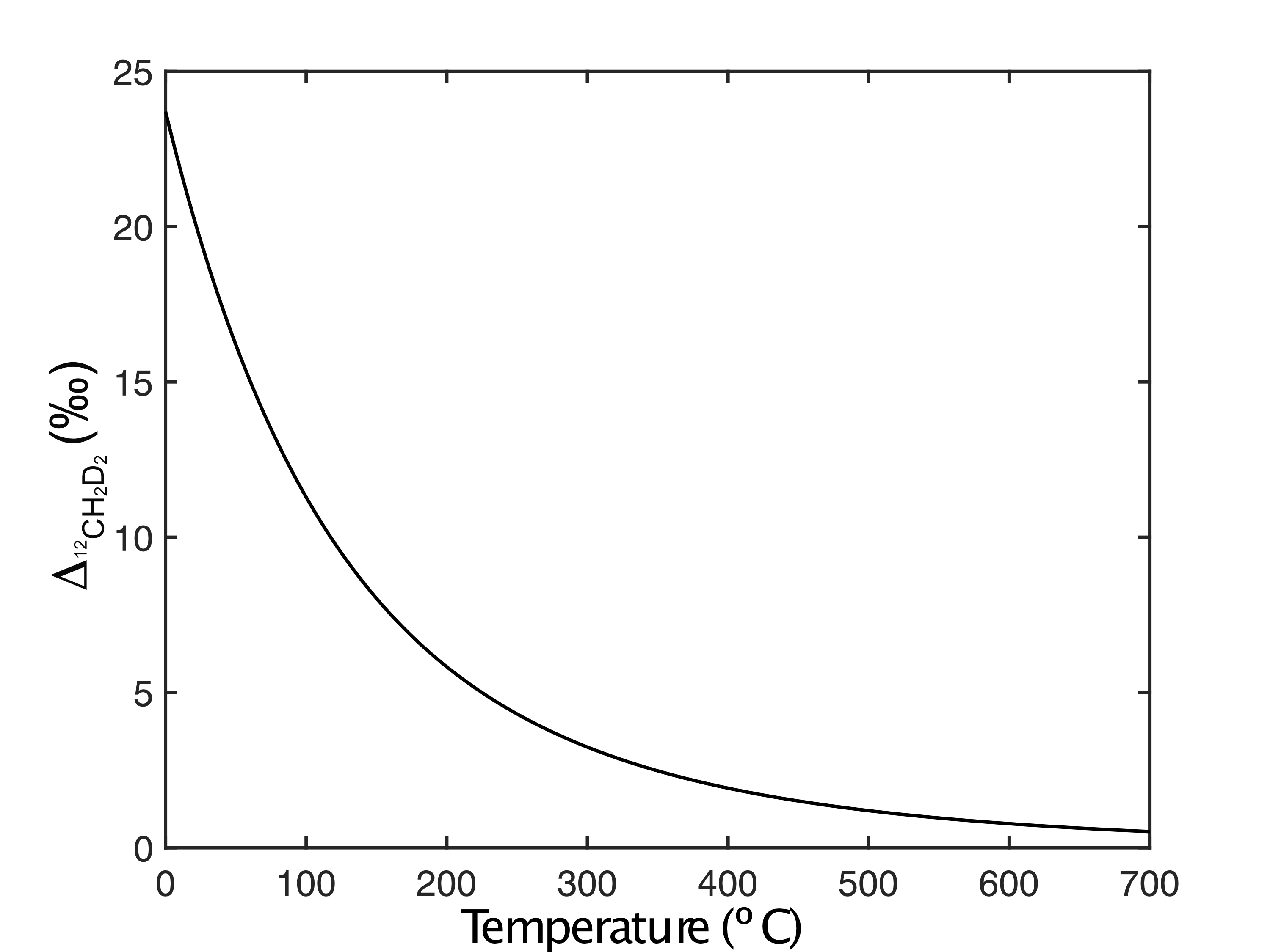
The equilibrium distribution of $\Delta_{^{12}CH_2D_2}$ as a monotonic function of temperature. Redrawn from Young et al., 2017.

$\Delta_{^{12}CH_2D_2}={\left ( \frac{0.183798}T \right )}-{\left ( \frac{785.483}{T^2} \right )}+\left ( \frac{1056280.0}{T^3} \right )+\left ( \frac{9.37307\times10^7}{T^4} \right ) -\left ( \frac{8.919480\times10^{10}}{T^5} \right )+\left ( \frac{9.901730\times10^{12}}{T^6} \right )$

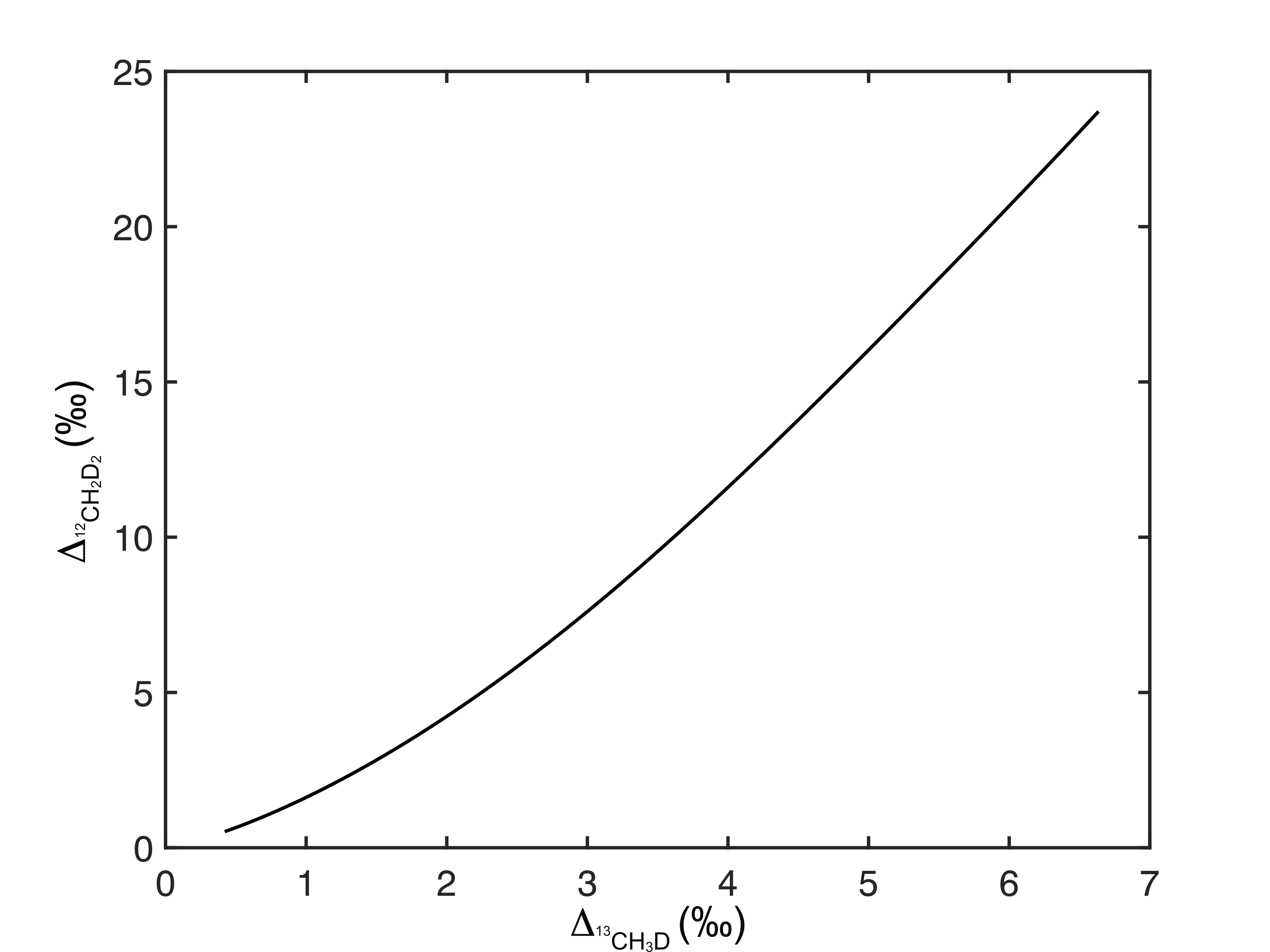
The equilibrium distribution of $\Delta_{^{12}CH_2D_2}$ and $\Delta_{^{13}CH_3D}$. Redrawn from Young et al., 2017.

Based on these correlations, $\Delta_{18}$, $\Delta_{^{13}CH_3D}$ and $\Delta_{^{12}CH_2D_2}$ can be used as a geothermometer to indicate the formation temperature of methane ($T_{18}$, $T_{^{13}CH_3D}$ and $T_{^{12}CH_2D_2}$). And the correlation of $\Delta_{^{13}CH_3D}$ and $\Delta_{^{12}CH_2D_2}$can help to determine whether methane is formed in internal isotopic equilibrium.

=== Kinetic isotope effects ===
Kinetic isotope effect (KIE) occurs in irreversible reactions, such as methanogenesis, and can deviate methane clumped isotopologue composition from its thermodynamic equilibrium. Normally, KIE significantly drives $\Delta_{18}$ and $\Delta_{^{13}CH_3D}$ lower than their equilibrium states and even to negative values (i.e. more depleted of clumped isotopologues than stochastic distribution. Such lower $\Delta_{18}$ and $\Delta_{^{13}CH_3D}$ values correspond to apparent formation temperatures that are significantly higher than actual formation temperature, or to no possible temperatures (when a Δ value is smaller than zero, there is no inferred equilibration temperature associated with it).

=== Mixing effect ===
Mixing between end-members with different conventional carbon and hydrogen isotope compositions (i.e. δ^{13}C, δD) results in non-linear variations in $\Delta_{18}$ or $\Delta_{^{13}CH_3D}$. This non-linearity results from the non-linear definition of $\Delta_{18}$ and $\Delta_{^{13}CH_3D}$ values in reference to the random distributions of methane isotopologues ($^{^{13}CH_3D}R^*= 4\times{^2R}\times{^{13}R}$ and $^{18}R^*= ^{^{13}CH_3D}R^*+^{^{12}CH_2D_2}R^*=4\times{^2R}\times{^{13}R}+6\times{^2R}^2$, as in "Notation"), which are non-linear polynomial functions of δD and δ^{13}C values. Such non-linearity can be a diagnostic signature for mixing if multiple samples of various mixing ratios can be measured. When end-members have similar δ^{13}C or δD compositions, the non-linearity is negligible.

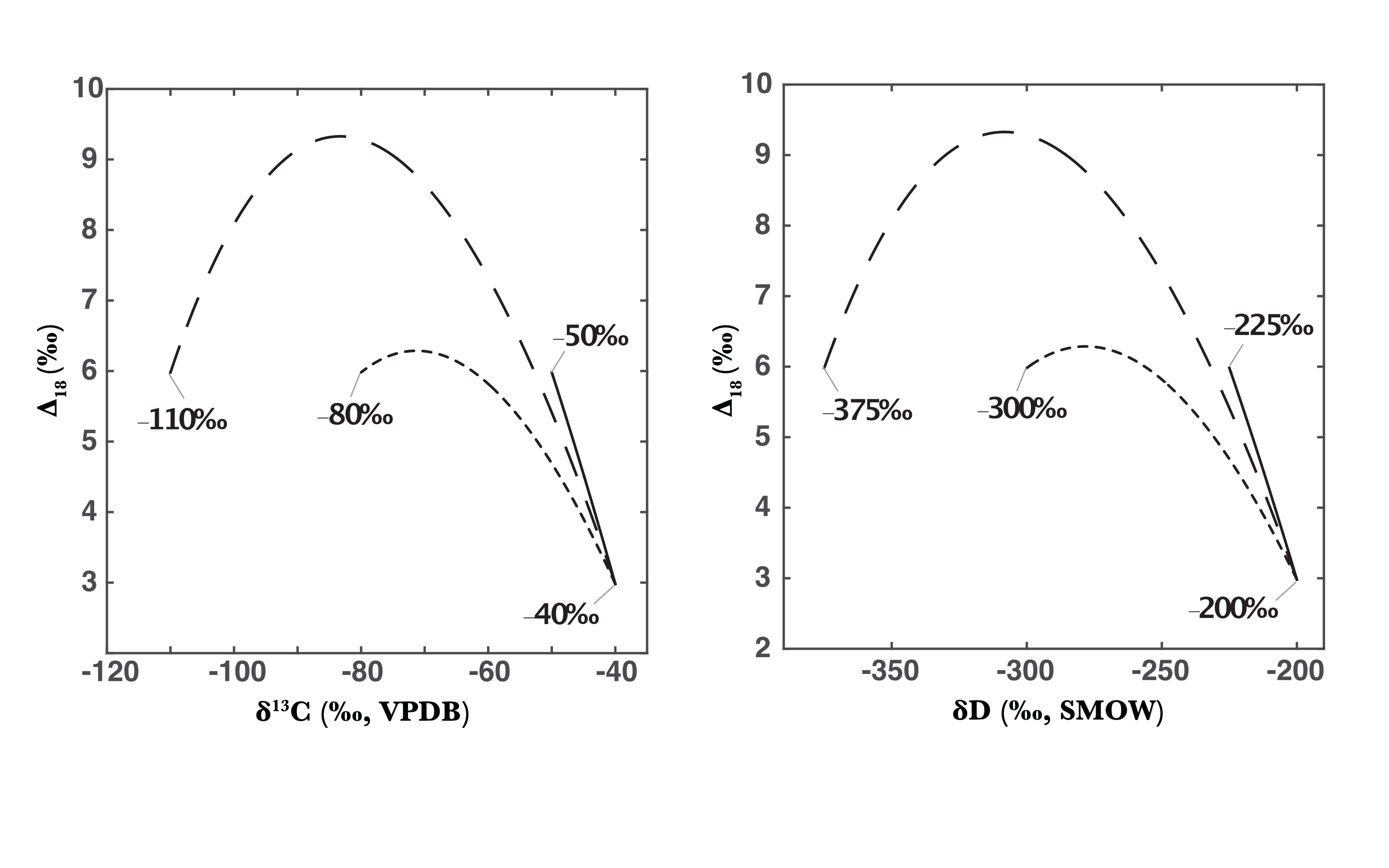
Examples of mixing effects for $\Delta_{18}$ values. Mixing relationships in δ^{13}C-$\Delta_{18}$ space and δD-$\Delta_{18}$ space for mixtures of methane with varying end-member compositions. The end-member $\Delta_{18}$ values remain fixed, but the end-member δ^{13}C and δD values vary. Redrawn from Douglas et al., 2017.

== Measurement techniques ==
=== Mass spectrometry ===
On an isotope-ratio mass spectrometer, the measurement of clumped isotopologues has to be conducted on intact methane molecules, instead of converting methane to CO_{2,} H_{2} or H_{2}O. High mass resolution is required to distinguish different isotopologues of very close relative molecular mass (same "cardinal mass", e.g. ^{13}CH_{4} and ^{12}CH_{3}D (17.03465 Da (daltons) versus 17.03758 Da), ^{13}CH_{3}D and ^{12}CH_{2}D_{2} (18.04093 Da versus 18.04385 Da). Currently, two commercial models capable of such measurement are Thermo Scientific 253 Ultra and the Panorama by Nu Instruments.

=== Infrared spectroscopy ===
Tunable infrared laser direct absorption spectroscopy (TILDAS) has been developed to measure the abundance of ^{13}CH_{3}D with two continuous wave quantum cascade lasers.

== Theoretical studies ==
There have been several theoretical studies on equilibrium thermodynamics of methane clumped isotopologues since 2008. These studies are based on ab initio, from underlying physical chemistry principles, and do not rely on empirical, or lab-based, data.

Ma et al. utilized first-principle quantum mechanism molecular calculation (Density Functional Theory, or DFT) to study the temperature dependence of the ^{13}CH_{3}D abundance. Cao and Liu estimated $\Delta_{18}$ and $\Delta_{^{13}CH_3D}$ based on statistical mechanics. Webb and Miller combined path-integral Monte Carlo methods with high-quality potential energy surfaces to more rigorously compute equilibrium isotope effects of $\Delta_{^{13}CH_3D}$ compared to Urey model using reduced partition function ratios. Piasecki et al. performed first-principles calculations of the equilibrium distributions of all substituted isotopologues of methane.

The overall conclusion of theoretical studies is $\Delta_{^{13}CH_3D}$ and $\Delta_{18}$vary as decreasing monotonic functions of temperature, and the enrichment of multiply D-substituted > multiply ^{13}C-D-substituted > multiply ^{13}C-substituted isotopologues for a same number of substitutions (as shown in this figure).

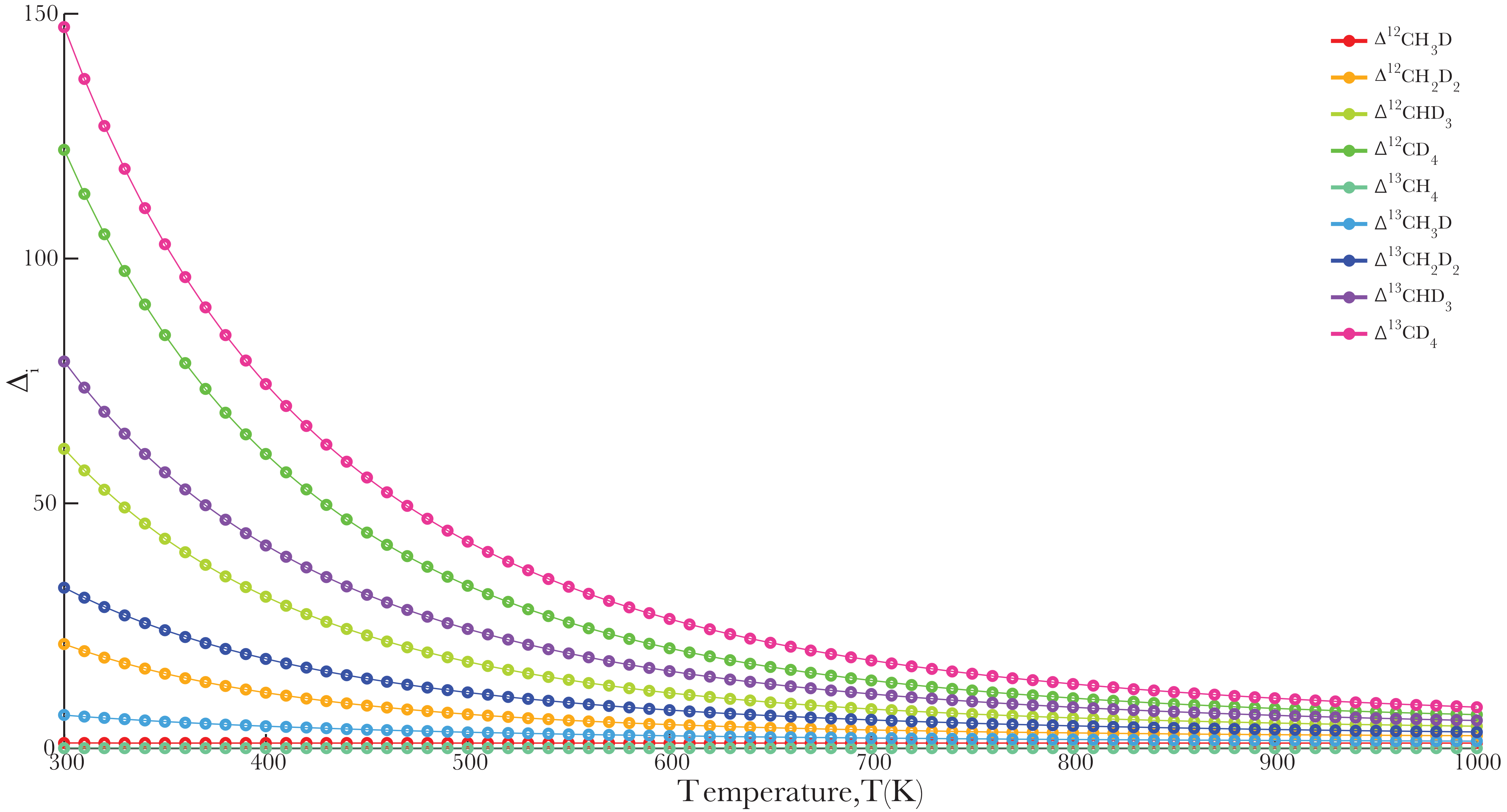
The theoretical equilibrium distribution of all singly and multiply substituted isotopologues of methane as a function of temperature, assuming isotopes are of natural abundance. Redrawn from Piasecki et al., 2016.

== Distribution in nature ==
=== Geosphere ===
Many studies have observed composition of thermogenic methane in equilibria. The reported $T_{18}$ and $T_{^{13}CH_3D}$ are normally distributed within the range of 72 to 298 °C (peak value: $175\pm47$°C), which aligns well with modeled results of methane formation temperature and yield. However, some thermogenic methane samples have clumped-isotope temperatures that are unrealistically high. Possible explanations for exceedingly high clumped isotope temperatures include natural gas migration after formation, mixing effect, and kinetic isotope effect of secondary cracking.

=== Biosphere ===
Methanogenesis is a form of anaerobic respiration used by microbes, and microbial methanogenesis can occur in deep subsurface, marine sediments, freshwater bodies, etc. It appears that methane from deep subsurface and marine sediment is generally in internal isotopic equilibrium., while freshwater microbial methanogenesis expresses large kinetic isotope effect on methane clumped isotope composition.

There are two possible explanations for this variance: firstly, substrate limitation may enhance the reversibility of methanogenesis, thus allowing methane to achieve internal isotopic equilibrium via rapid hydrogen exchange with water; secondly, activation of C-H bonds during anaerobic oxidation precedes reversibly such that C-H bonds are broken and reformed faster than the net rate of methane consumption and methane can be reequilibrated.

== Experimental studies ==
=== Calibration of equilibrium thermodynamics ===
Theoretical calculations have predicted $\Delta_{18}$ and $\Delta_{^{13}CH_3D}$ values of methane in internal isotopic equilibrium. As there are assumptions and approximations in calculations, the equilibrium distribution is only experimentally validated after the analysis of samples brought to thermodynamic equilibrium. Nickel and platinum catalysts have been used to equilibrate methane C-H bonds at various temperatures from 150 to 500 °C in laboratory. Currently, catalytic equilibration is also the practice to develop the reference material for clumped isotope analysis .

=== Microbial culture ===
Hydrogenotrophic methanogens utilize CO_{2} and H_{2} to produce methane by the following reaction:

CO_{2} + 4H_{2} → CH_{4} + 2H_{2}O

Acetoclastic methanogens metabolize acetate acid and produce methane:

CH_{3}COOH → CH_{4} + CO_{2}

In laboratories, clumped isotope compositions of methane generated by hydrogenotrophic methanogens, acetoclastic methanogens (biodegradation of acetate), and methylotrophic methanogens are universally out of equilibria. It has been proposed that the reversibility of methanogenic enzyme is key to the kinetic isotope effect expressed in biogenic methane.

=== Pyrolysis of larger organic molecules ===
Both pyrolysis of propane and closed-system hydrous pyrolysis of organic matter generate methane of $T_{18}$ consistent with experimental temperatures. Closed-system nonhydrous pyrolysis of coal yields non-equilibrium distribution of methane isotopologues.

=== Sabatier reaction ===
Methane synthesized by Sabatier reaction is largely depleted in CH_{2}D_{2} and slightly depleted in ^{13}CH_{3}D relative to the equilibrium state. It has been proposed that quantum tunneling effects result in the low $\Delta_{^{12}CH_2D_2}$ observed in the experiment.

== Applications ==
=== Distinguishing origins of natural gas ===
Biogenic, thermogenic and abiotic methane is formed at different temperatures, which can be recorded in clumped isotope compositions of methane. Combined with conventional carbon and hydrogen isotope fingerprints and gas wetness (the abundance of low molecular weight hydrocarbon), methane clumped isotope can be used to identify the origins of methane in different types of natural gas accumulations.

=== Biogeochemistry of microbial methane ===
In freshwater environments, significant kinetic isotope effect leads to a wide range of observed $\Delta_{18}$ and $\Delta_{^{13}CH_3D}$ values, which has the potential to provide insights into methanogenesis rate and chemical condition in the corresponding environments.

== See also ==
- Methane
- Isotope
- Carbon isotopes
- Hydrogen isotopes
- Isotopic signature
- Isotope geochemistry
- Isotopologue
- Isotopomer
- Clumped isotopes
- Isotope-ratio mass spectrometry
- Hydrogen isotope geochemistry of natural gas
- Methanogenesis
- Kinetic isotope effect
