= Reference materials for stable isotope analysis =

Materials with a well-defined isotopic composition

Isotopic reference materials are compounds (solids, liquids, gasses) with well-defined isotopic compositions and are the ultimate sources of accuracy in mass spectrometric measurements of isotope ratios. Isotopic references are used because mass spectrometers are highly fractionating. As a result, the isotopic ratio that the instrument measures can be very different from that in the sample's measurement. Moreover, the degree of instrument fractionation changes during measurement, often on a timescale shorter than the measurement's duration, and can depend on the characteristics of the sample itself. By measuring a material of known isotopic composition, fractionation within the mass spectrometer can be removed during post-measurement data processing. Without isotope references, measurements by mass spectrometry would be much less accurate and could not be used in comparisons across different analytical facilities. Due to their critical role in measuring isotope ratios, and in part, due to historical legacy, isotopic reference materials define the scales on which isotope ratios are reported in the peer-reviewed scientific literature.

Isotope reference materials are generated, maintained, and sold by the International Atomic Energy Agency (IAEA), the National Institute of Standards and Technology (NIST), the United States Geologic Survey (USGS), the Institute for Reference Materials and Measurements (IRMM), and a variety of universities and scientific supply companies. Each of the major stable isotope systems (hydrogen, carbon, oxygen, nitrogen, and sulfur) has a wide variety of references encompassing distinct molecular structures. For example, nitrogen isotope reference materials include N-bearing molecules such ammonia (NH_{3}), atmospheric dinitrogen (N_{2}), and nitrate (NO_{3}^{−}). Isotopic abundances are commonly reported using the δ notation, which is the ratio of two isotopes (R) in a sample relative to the same ratio in a reference material, often reported in per mille (‰) (equation below). Reference material span a wide range of isotopic compositions, including enrichments (positive δ) and depletions (negative δ). While the δ values of references are widely available, estimates of the absolute isotope ratios (R) in these materials are seldom reported. This article aggregates the δ and R values of common and non-traditional stable isotope reference materials.

$\delta^{X} = \frac{^{x/y}R_{sample}}{^{x/y}R_{reference}}-1$

== Common reference materials ==
The δ values and absolute isotope ratios of common reference materials are summarized in Table 1 and described in more detail below. Alternative values for the absolute isotopic ratios of reference materials, differing only modestly from those in Table 1, are presented in Table 2.5 of Sharp (2007) (a text freely available online), as well as Table 1 of the 1993 IAEA report on isotopic reference materials. For an exhaustive list of reference material, refer to Appendix I of Sharp (2007), Table 40.1 of Gröning (2004), or the website of the International Atomic Energy Agency. Note that the ^{13}C/^{12}C ratio of Vienna Pee Dee Belemnite (VPDB) and ^{34}S/^{32}S ratio of Vienna Canyon Diablo Troilite (VCDT) are purely mathematical constructs; neither material existed as a physical sample that could be measured.

Table 1: Isotopic parameters of common stable isotope primary reference and calibration materials
Name	Material	Type of ratio	Isotope ratio: R (σ)	δ: (R_{smp}/R_{std}-1)	Type	Citation	Notes
VSMOW	H_{2}O (l)	^{2}H/^{1}H	0.00015576(5)	0‰ vs. VSMOW	Primary, Calibration	Hagemann et al. (1970) (Tse et al. (1980); De Wit et al. (1980)	Analogous to SMOW (math construct), VSMOW2 (physical solution)
SLAP2	H_{2}O (l)	^{2}H/^{1}H	0.00008917	-427.5‰ vs. VSMOW	Reference	Calculated from VSMOW	Used as a second anchor for the δ^{2}H scale
GISP	H_{2}O (l)	^{2}H/^{1}H	0.00012624	-189.5‰ vs. VSMOW	Reference	Calculated from VSMOW	Stock potentially fractionated during aliquoting
NBS-19	CaCO_{3} (s)	^{13}C/^{12}C	0.011202(28)	+1.95‰ vs. VPDB	Calibration	Chang & Li (1990)	Defines the VPDB scale, supply is exhausted
VPDB	-	^{13}C/^{12}C	0.011180	0‰ vs. VPDB	Primary	Calculated from NBS-19 (see also Zhang et al. (1990))	Supply of PDB (as well as PDB II, PDB III) exhausted VPDB was never a physical material.
IAEA-603	CaCO_{3} (s)	^{13}C/^{12}C	0.011208	+2.46‰ vs. VPDB	Calibration	Calculated from VPDB	Replacement for NBS-19
LSVEC	Li_{2}CO_{3} (s)	^{13}C/^{12}C	0.010686	-46.6‰ vs. VPDB	Reference	Calculated from VPDB	Used as a second anchor for the δ^{13}C scale
AIR	N_{2} (g)	^{15}N/^{14}N	0.003676(4)	0‰ vs. AIR	Primary, Calibration	Junk & Svec (1958)	Only anchor for the δ^{15}N scale
VSMOW	H_{2}O (l)	^{18}O/^{16}O	0.0020052(5)	0‰ vs. VSMOW	Primary, Calibration	Baertschi (1976); Li et al. (1988)	Analogous to SMOW (math construct), VSMOW2 (physical solution)
VSMOW	H_{2}O (l)	^{17}O/^{16}O	0.0003800(9)	0‰ vs. VSMOW	Primary, Calibration	Baertschi (1976); Li et al. (1988)	Analogous to SMOW (math construct), VSMOW2 (physical solution)
SLAP2	H_{2}O (l)	^{18}O/^{16}O	0.0018939	-55.5‰ vs. VSMOW	Reference	Calculated from VSMOW	Used as a second anchor for the δ^{18}O scale
GISP	H_{2}O (l)	^{18}O/^{16}O	0.0019556	-24.76‰ vs. VSMOW	Reference	Calculated from VSMOW	Stock potentially fractionated during aliquoting
IAEA-S-1	Ag_{2}S (s)	^{36}S/^{32}S	0.0001534(9)			Ding et al. (2001)	There is no formal definition for the δ^{33}S isotopic scale
IAEA-S-1	Ag_{2}S (s)	^{34}S/^{32}S	0.0441494(70)	-0.3‰ vs. VCDT	Calibration	Ding et al. (2001)	Defines the VCDT scale, only anchor for δ^{34}S scale
IAEA-S-1	Ag_{2}S (s)	^{33}S/^{32}S	0.0078776(63)			Ding et al. (2001)	There is no formal definition for the δ^{36}S isotopic scale
VCDT	-	^{34}S/^{32}S	0.0441626	0‰ vs. VCDT	Primary	Calculated from IAEA-S-1	Canyon Diablo Troilite is isotopically heterogenousVCDT was never a physical material

In Table 1, "Name" refers to the common name of the reference, "Material" gives its chemical formula and phase, "Type of ratio" is the isotopic ratio reported in "Isotopic ratio", "δ" is the δ value of the material with indicated reference frame, "Type" is the category of the material using the notation of Gröening (2004) (discussed below), "Citation" gives the article(s) reporting the isotopic abundances on which the isotope ratio is based, and "Notes" are notes. The reported isotopic ratios reflect the results from individual analyses of absolute mass fraction, aggregated in Meija et al. (2016) and manipulated to reach the given ratios. Error was calculated as the square root of the sum of the squares of fractional reported errors, consistent with standard error propagation, but is not propagated for ratios reached through secondary calculation.

== Reference terminology ==
The terminology of isotopic reference materials is not applied consistently across subfields of isotope geochemistry or even between individual laboratories. The terminology defined below comes from Gröening et al. (1999) and Gröening (2004). Reference materials are the basis for accuracy across many different types of measurement, not only the mass spectrometry, and there is a large body of literature concerned with the certification and testing of reference materials.

=== Primary reference materials ===
Primary reference materials define the scales on which isotopic ratios are reported. This can mean a material that historically defined an isotopic scale, such as Vienna Standard Mean Ocean Water (VSMOW) for hydrogen isotopes, even if that material is not currently in use. Alternatively, it can mean a material that only ever existed theoretically but is used to define an isotopic scale, such as VCDT for sulfur isotope ratios.

=== Calibration materials ===
Calibration materials are compounds whose isotopic composition is known extremely well relative to the primary reference materials or which define the isotopic composition of the primary reference materials but are not the isotopic ratios to which data are reported in the scientific literature. For example, the calibration material IAEA-S-1 defines the isotopic scale for sulfur but measurements are reported relative to VCDT, not relative to IAEA-S-1. The calibration material serves the function of the primary reference material when the primary reference is exhausted, unavailable, or never existed in physical form.

=== Reference materials ===
Reference materials are compounds which are carefully calibrated against the primary reference or a calibration material. These compounds allow for isotopic analysis of materials differing in chemical or isotopic composition from the compounds defining the isotopic scales on which measurements are reported. In general these are the materials most researchers mean when they say "reference materials". An example of a reference material is USGS-34, a KNO_{3} salt with a δ^{15}N of -1.8‰ vs. AIR. In this case the reference material has a mutually agreed upon value of δ^{15}N when measured relative to the primary reference of atmospheric N_{2} (Böhlke et al., 2003). USGS-34 is useful because it allows researchers to directly measure the ^{15}N/^{14}N of NO_{3}^{−} in natural samples against the standard and report observations relative to N_{2} without having to first convert the sample to N_{2} gas.

=== Working standards ===
Primary, calibration, and reference materials are only available in small quantities and purchase is often limited to once every few years. Depending on the specific isotope systems and instrumentation, a shortage of available reference materials can be problematic for daily instrument calibrations or for researchers attempting to measure isotope ratios in a large number of natural samples. Rather than using primary materials or reference materials, a laboratory measuring stable isotope ratios will typically purchase a small quantity of the relevant reference materials and measure the isotope ratio of an in-house material against the reference, making that material into a working standard specific to that analytical facility. Once this lab-specific working standard has been calibrated to the international scale the standard is used to measure the isotopic composition of unknown samples. After measurement of both sample and working standard against a third material (commonly called the working gas or the transfer gas) the recorded isotopic distributions are mathematically corrected back to the international scale. It is thus critical to measure the isotopic composition of the working standard with high precision and accuracy (as well as possible given the precision of the instrument and the accuracy of the purchased reference material) because the working standard forms the ultimate basis for accuracy of most mass spectrometric observations. Unlike reference materials, working standards are typically not calibrated across multiple analytical facilities and the accepted δ value measured in a given laboratory could reflect bias specific to a single instrument. However, within a single analytical facility this bias can be removed during data reduction. Because each laboratory defines unique working standards the primary, calibration, and reference materials are long-lived while still ensuring that the isotopic composition of unknown samples can be compared across laboratories.

== Isotopic reference materials ==
=== Traditional isotope systems ===
The compounds used as isotopic references have a relatively complex history. The broad evolution of reference materials for the hydrogen, carbon, oxygen, and sulfur stable isotope systems are shown in Figure 1. Materials with red text define the primary reference commonly reported in scientific publications and materials with blue text are those available commercially. The hydrogen, carbon, and oxygen isotope scales are defined with two anchoring reference materials. For hydrogen the modern scale is defined by VSMOW2 and SLAP2, and is reported relative to VSMOW. For carbon the scale is defined by either NBS-19 or IAEA-603 depending on the age of the lab, as well as LSVEC, and is reported relative to VPDB. Oxygen isotope ratios can be reported relative to either the VSMOW or VPDB scales. The isotopic scales for sulfur and nitrogen are both defined for only a single anchoring reference material. For sulfur the scale is defined by IAEA-S-1 and is reported relative to VCDT, while for nitrogen the scale is both defined by and reported relative to AIR.

Figure 1: The development of modern stable isotope reference materials. The materials shown in red are used commonly as the reference for reporting isotopic ratios in natural materials, while those shown in blue are commercially available and are used to calibrate working references materials for measuring isotopic ratios. The N isotope system is not included because the reference material has never changed from atmospheric N_{2}.

==== Hydrogen ====
The isotopic reference frame of Standard Mean Ocean Water (SMOW) was established by Harmon Craig in 1961 by measuring δ^{2}H and δ^{18}O in samples of deep ocean water previously studied by Epstein & Mayeda (1953). Originally SMOW was a purely theoretical isotope ratio intended to represent the mean state of the deep ocean. In the initial work the isotopic ratios of deep ocean water were measured relative to NBS-1, a standard derived from the steam condensate of Potomac River water. Notably, this means SMOW was originally defined relative to NBS-1, and there was no physical SMOW solution. Following the advice of an IAEA advisory group meeting in 1966, Ray Weiss and Harmon Craig made an actual solution with the isotopic values of SMOW which they called Vienna Standard Mean Ocean Water (VSMOW). They also prepared a second hydrogen isotope reference material from firn collected at the Amundsen-Scott South Pole Station, initially called SNOW and later called Standard Light Antarctic Precipitation (SLAP). Both VSMOW and SLAP were distributed beginning in 1968. The isotopic characteristics of SLAP and NBS-1 were later evaluated by interlaboratory comparison through measurements against VSMOW (Gonfiantini, 1978). Subsequently, VSMOW and SLAP were used as the primary isotopic reference materials for the hydrogen isotope system for multiple decades. In 2006 the IAEA Isotope Hydrology Laboratory constructed new isotopic reference materials called VSMOW2 and SLAP2 with nearly identical δ^{2}H and δ^{18}O as VSMOW and SLAP. Hydrogen isotope working standards are currently calibrated against VSMOW2 and SLAP2 but are still reported on the scale defined by VSMOW and SLAP relative to VSMOW. Additionally, Greenland Ice Sheet Precipitation (GISP) δ^{2}H has been measured to high precision in multiple labs, but different analytical facilities disagree on the value. These observations suggest GISP may have been fractionated during aliquoting or storage, implying that the reference material should be used with care.

Table 2: Hydrogen Isotope Reference Materials
Name	Material	δ^{2}H	Standard deviation	Reference	Link
VSMOW2	H_{2}O	0‰	0.3‰	VSMOW	Link
SLAP2	H_{2}O	-427.5‰	0.3‰	VSMOW	Link
GISP	H_{2}O	-189.5‰	1.2‰	VSMOW	Link
NBS 22	Oil	-120‰	1‰	VSMOW	Link

==== Carbon ====
The original carbon isotope reference material was a Belemnite fossil from the PeeDee Formation in South Carolina, known as the Pee Dee Belemnite (PDB). This PDB standard was rapidly consumed and subsequently researchers used replacement standards such as PDB II and PDB III. The carbon isotope reference frame was later established in Vienna against a hypothetical material called the Vienna Pee Dee Belemnite (VPDB). As with the original SMOW, VPDB never existed as a physical solution or solid. In order to make measurements researchers use the reference material NBS-19, colloquially known as the Toilet Seat Limestone, which has an isotopic ratio defined relative to the hypothetical VPDB. The exact origin of NBS-19 is unknown but it was a white marble slab and has a grain size of 200-300 micrometers. To improve the accuracy of carbon isotope measurements, in 2006 the δ^{13}C scale was shifted from a one-point calibration against NBS-19 to a two point-calibration. In the new system the VPDB scale is pinned to both the LSVEC Li_{2}CO_{3} reference material and to the NBS-19 limestone (Coplen et al., 2006a; Coplen et al., 2006b). NBS-19 is now also exhausted and has been replaced with IAEA-603.

Table 3: Carbon Isotope Reference Materials
Name	Material	δ^{13}C	Standard deviation	Reference	Link
IAEA-603	CaCO_{3}	2.46‰	0.01‰	VPDB	Link
NBS-18	CaCO_{3}	-5.014‰	0.035‰	VPDB	Link
NBS-19	CaCO_{3}	1.95‰	-	VPDB	Link
LSVEC	Li_{2}CO_{3}	-46.6‰	0.2‰	VPDB	Link
IAEA-CO-1	Carrara marble	+2.492‰	0.030‰	VPDB	Link
IAEA-CO-8	CaCO_{3}	-5.764‰	0.032‰	VPDB	Link
IAEA-CO-9	BaCO_{3}	-47.321‰	0.057‰	VPDB	Link
NBS 22	Oil	-30.031‰	0.043‰	VPDB	Link

==== Oxygen ====
Oxygen isotopic ratios are commonly compared to both the VSMOW and the VPDB references. Traditionally oxygen in water is reported relative to VSMOW while oxygen liberated from carbonate rocks or other geologic archives is reported relative to VPDB. As in the case of hydrogen, the oxygen isotopic scale is defined by two materials, VSMOW2 and SLAP2. Measurements of sample δ^{18}O vs. VSMOW can be converted to the VPDB reference frame through the following equation: δ^{18}O_{VPDB} = 0.97001*δ^{18}O_{VSMOW} - 29.99‰ (Brand et al., 2014).

Table 4: Oxygen Isotope Reference Materials
Name	Material	δ^{18}O	Standard deviation	Reference	Link
VSMOW2	H_{2}O	0‰	0.02‰	VSMOW	Link
SLAP2	H_{2}O	-55.50‰	0.02‰	VSMOW	Link
GISP	H_{2}O	-24.76‰	0.09‰	VSMOW	Link
IAEA-603	CaCO_{3}	-2.37‰	0.04‰	VPDB	Link
NBS-18	CaCO_{3}	-23.2‰	0.1‰	VPDB	Link
NBS-19	CaCO_{3}	-2.20‰	-	VPDB	Link
LSVEC	Li_{2}CO_{3}	-26.7 ‰	0.2‰	VPDB	Link
IAEA-CO-1	Carrara marble	-2.4	0.1‰	VPDB	Link
IAEA-CO-8	CaCO_{3}	-22.7	0.2‰	VPDB	Link
IAEA-CO-9	BaCO_{3}	-15.6 ‰	0.2‰	VPDB	Link

==== Nitrogen ====
Nitrogen gas (N_{2}) makes up 78% of the atmosphere and is extremely well mixed over short time-scales, resulting in a homogenous isotopic distribution ideal for use as a reference material. Atmospheric N_{2} is commonly called AIR when being used as an isotopic reference. In addition to atmospheric N_{2} there are multiple N isotopic reference materials.

Table 5: Nitrogen Isotope Reference Materials
Name	Material	δ^{15}N	Standard deviation	Reference	Link	Source/derivation of material
IAEA-N-1	(NH_{4})_{2}SO_{4}	0.4‰	0.2‰	AIR	Link	
IAEA-N-2	(NH_{4})_{2}SO_{4}	20.3‰	0.2‰	AIR	Link	
IAEA-NO-3	KNO_{3}	4.7‰	0.2‰	AIR	Link	
USGS32	KNO_{3}	180‰	1‰	AIR	Link	
USGS34	KNO_{3}	-1.8‰	0.2‰	AIR	Link	from nitric acid
USGS35	NaNO_{3}	2.7‰	0.2‰	AIR	Link	purified from natural ores
USGS25	(NH_{4})_{2}SO_{4}	-30.4‰	0.4‰	AIR	Link	
USGS26	(NH_{4})_{2}SO_{4}	53.7‰	0.4‰	AIR	Link	
NSVEC	N_{2} gas	-2.8‰	0.2‰	AIR	Link	
IAEA-305	(NH_{4})_{2}SO_{4}	39.8‰ 375.3‰	39.3 - 40.3‰ 373.0 - 377.6‰	AIR	Link	derived from ammonium sulfate SD given as 95% confidence interval
IAEA-310	CH_{4}N_{2}O	47.2‰ 244.6‰	46.0 - 48.5‰ 243.9 - 245.4‰	AIR	Link	derived from urea SD given as 95% confidence interval
IAEA-311	(NH_{4})_{2}SO_{4}	2.05 ‰	2.03 - 2.06‰	AIR	Link	SD given as 95% confidence interval

==== Sulfur ====
The original sulfur isotopic reference material was the Canyon Diablo Troilite (CDT), a meteorite recovered from Meteor Crater in Arizona. The Canyon Diablo Meteorite was chosen because it was thought to have a sulfur isotopic composition similar to the bulk Earth. However, the meteorite was later found to be isotopically heterogeneous with variations up to 0.4‰. This isotopic variability resulted in problems for the inter-laboratory calibration of sulfur isotope measurements. A meeting of the IAEA in 1993 defined Vienna Canyon Diablo Troilite (VCDT) in an allusion to the earlier establishment of VSMOW. Like the original SMOW and VPDB, VCDT was never a physical material that could be measured but was still used as the definition of the sulfur isotopic scale. For the purposes of actually measuring ^{34}S/^{32}S ratios, the IAEA defined the δ^{34}S of IAEA-S-1 (originally called IAEA-NZ1) to be -0.30‰ relative to VCDT. These changes to the sulfur isotope reference materials greatly improved inter-laboratory reproducibility.

Table 6: Sulfur Isotope Reference Materials
Name	Material	δ^{34}S	Standard deviation	Reference	Link	Source/derivation of material
IAEA-S-1	Ag_{2}S	-0.30‰	-	VCDT	Link	from sphalerite (ZnS)
IAEA-S-2	Ag_{2}S	22.7‰	0.2‰	VCDT	Link	from gypsum (Ca_{2}SO_{4}*2H_{2}O)
IAEA-S-3	Ag_{2}S	-32.3‰	0.2‰	VCDT	Link	from sphalerite (ZnS)
IAEA-S-4	S	16.9‰	0.2‰	VCDT	Link	from natural gas
IAEA - SO-5:	BaSO_{4}	0.5‰	0.2‰	VCDT	Link	from aqueous sulfate (SO_{4})
IAEA - SO-6	BaSO_{4}	-34.1‰	0.2‰	VCDT	Link	from aqueous sulfate (SO_{4})
NBS - 127	BaSO_{4}	20.3‰	0.4‰	VCDT	Link	from sulfate (SO_{4}) from Monterey Bay

==== Organic molecules ====
A recent international project has developed and determined the hydrogen, carbon, and nitrogen isotopic composition of 19 organic isotopic reference materials, now available from USGS, IAEA, and Indiana University. These reference materials span a large range of δ^{2}H (-210.8‰ to +397.0‰), δ^{13}C (-40.81‰ to +0.49‰), and δ^{15}N (-5.21‰ to +61.53‰), and are amenable to a wide range of analytical techniques. The organic reference materials include caffeine, glycine, n-hexadecane, icosanoic acid methyl ester (C_{20} FAME), L-valine, methylheptadecanoate, polyethylene foil, polyethylene power, vacuum oil, and NBS-22.

Table 7: Isotope Reference Materials for Organic Molecules
Name	Chemical	δD_{VSMOW-SLAP} (‰)	δ^{13}C_{VPDB-LSVEC} (‰)	δ^{15}N_{AIR} (‰)
USGS61	caffeine	96.9 ± 0.9	-35.05 ± 0.04	-2.87 ± 0.04
USGS62	caffeine	-156.1 ± 2.1	-14.79 ± 0.04	20.17 ± 0.06
USGS63	caffeine	174.5 ± 0.9	-1.17 ± 0.04	37.83 ± 0.06
IAEA-600	caffeine	-156.1 ± 1.3	-27.73 ± 0.04	1.02 ± 0.05
USGS64	glycine	-	-40.81 ± 0.04	1.76 ± 0.06
USGS65	glycine	-	-20.29 ± 0.04	20.68 ± 0.06
USGS66	glycine	-	-0.67 ± 0.04	40.83 ± 0.06
USGS67	n-hexadecane	-166.2 ± 1.0	-34.5 ± 0.05	-
USGS68	n-hexadecane	-10.2 ± 0.9	-10.55 ± 0.04	-
USGS69	n-hexadecane	381.4 ± 3.5	-0.57 ± 0.04	-
USGS70	icosanoic acid methyl ester	-183.9 ± 1.4	-30.53 ± 0.04	-
USGS71	icosanoic acid methyl ester	-4.9 ± 1.0	-10.5 ± 0.03	-
USGS72	icosanoic acid methyl ester	348.3 ± 1.5	-1.54 ± 0.03	-
USGS73	L-valine	-	-24.03 ± 0.04	-5.21 ± 0.05
USGS74	L-valine	-	-9.3 ± 0.04	30.19 ± 0.07
USGS75	L-valine	-	0.49 ± 0.07	61.53 ± 0.14
USGS76	methylheptadecanoate	-210.8 ± 0.9	-31.36 ± 0.04	-
IAEA-CH-7	polyethylene foil	-99.2 ± 1.2	-32.14 ± 0.05	-
USGS77	polyethylene power	-75.9 ± 0.6	-30.71 ± 0.04	-
NBS 22	oil	-117.2 ± 0.6	-30.02 ± 0.04	-
NBS 22a	vacuum oil	-120.4 ± 1.0	-29.72 ± 0.04	-
USGS78	^{2}H-enriched vacuum oil	397.0 ± 2.2	-29.72 ± 0.04	-

The information in Table 7 comes directly from Table 2 of Schimmelmann et al. (2016).

=== Non-traditional isotope systems ===
==== Heavy isotope systems ====
Isotopic reference materials exist for non-traditional isotope systems (elements other than hydrogen, carbon, oxygen, nitrogen, and sulfur), including lithium, boron, magnesium, calcium, iron, and many others. Because the non-traditional systems were developed relatively recently, the reference materials for these systems are more straightforward and less numerous than for the traditional isotopic systems. The following table contains the material defining the δ=0 for each isotopic scale, the 'best' measurement of the absolute isotopic fractions of an indicated material (which is often the same as the material defining the scale, but not always), the calculated absolute isotopic ratio, and links to lists of isotopic reference materials prepared by the Commission on Isotopic Abundances and Atomic Weight (part of the International Union of Pure and Applied Chemistry (IUPAC)). A summary list of non-traditional stable isotope systems is available here, and much of this information is derived from Brand et al. (2014). In addition to the isotope systems listed in Table 8, ongoing research is focused on measuring the isotopic composition of barium (Allmen et al., 2010; Miyazaki et al., 2014; Nan et al., 2015) and vanadium (Nielson et al., 2011). Specpure Alfa Aesar is an isotopically well-characterized vanadium solution (Nielson et al., 2011). Furthermore, fractionation during chemical processing can be problematic for certain isotopic analyses, such as measuring heavy isotope ratios following column chromatography. In these cases reference materials can be calibrated for particular chemical procedures.

Table 8: Heavy Isotope Reference Materials
Element	Symbol	δ	Type of ratio	Name (material for δ = 0)	Material (material for δ = 0)	Name (material with 'best' measurement)	Isotope Ratio: R (σ)	Citation	Link
Lithium	Li	δ^{7}Li	^{7}Li/^{6}Li	LSVEC (NIST RM 8545)	Li_{2}CO_{3}	IRMM-016	12.17697(3864)	Qi et al. (1997)	Link
Boron	B	δ^{11}B	^{11}B/^{10}B	NIST SRM 951(a)	Boric acid	IRMM-011	4.0454(42)	De Bièvre & Debus (1969)	Link
Magnesium	Mg	δ^{26/24}Mg	^{26}Mg/^{24}Mg	DMS-3	NO_{3}^{−} solution	DSM-3	0.13969(13)	Bizzarro et al. (2011)	Link
Silicon	Si	δ^{30/28}Si	^{30}Si/^{28}Si	NBS 28 (NIST RM 8546)	Si sand	WASO-17.2	0.0334725(35)	De Bievre et al. (1997)	Link
Chlorine	Cl	δ^{37}Cl	^{37}Cl/^{35}Cl	SMOC	-	NIST SRM 975	0.319876(53)	Wei et al. (2012)	Link
Calcium	Ca	δ^{44/42}Ca	^{44}Ca/^{42}Ca	NIST SRM 915a	CaCO_{3}	NIST SRM 915	3.21947(1616)	Moore & Machlan (1972)	Link
Chromium	Cr	δ^{53/52}Cr	^{53}Cr/^{52}Cr	NIST SRM 979	Cr(NO_{3})_{3} salt	NIST SRM 979	0.113387(132)	Shields et al. (1966)	Link
Iron	Fe	δ^{56/54}Fe	^{56}Fe/^{54}Fe	IRMM-014	elemental Fe	IRMM-014	15.69786(61907)	Taylor et al. (1992)	Link
Nickel	Ni	δ^{60/58}Ni	^{60}Ni/^{58}Ni	NIST SRM 986	elemental Ni	NIST SRM 986	0.385198(82)	Gramlich et al. (1989)	Link
Copper	Cu	δ^{65}Cu	^{65}Cu/^{63}Cu	NIST SRM 976	elemental Cu	NIST SRM 976	0.44563(32)	Shields et al. (1965)	Link
Zinc	Zn	δ^{68/64}Zn	^{68}Zn/^{64}Zn	IRMM-3702	ZN (II) solution	IRMM-3702	0.375191(154)	Ponzevera et al. (2006)	Link
Gallium	Ga	δ^{71}Ga	^{71}Ga/^{69}Ga	NIST SRM 994	elemental Ga	NIST SRM 994	0.663675(124)	Machlan et al. (1986)	Link
Germanium	Ge	δ^{74/70}Ge	^{74}Ge/^{70}Ge	NIST SRM 3120a	elemental Ge	Ge metal	1.77935(503)	Yang & Meija (2010)	Link
Selenium	Se	δ^{82/76}Se	^{82}Se/^{76}Se	NIST SRM 3149	Se solution	NIST SRM 3149	0.9572(107)	Wang et al. (2011)	Link
Bromine	Br	δ^{81}Br	^{81}Br/^{79}Br	SMOB	-	NIST SRM 977	0.97293(72)	Catanzaro et al. (1964)	Link
Rubidium	Rb	δ^{87}Rb	^{87}Rb/^{85}Rb	NIST SRM 984	RbCl	NIST SRM 984	0.385706(196)	Catanzaro et al. (1969)	Link
Strontium	Sr	δ^{88/86}Sr	^{88}Sr/^{86}Sr	NIST SRM 987	SrCO_{3}	NIST SRM 987	8.378599(2967)	Moore et al. (1982)	Link
Molybdenum	Mo	δ^{98/95}Mo	^{98}Mo/^{95}Mo	NIST SRM 3134	solution	NIST SRM 3134	1.5304(101)	Mayer & Wieser (2014)	Link
Silver	Ag	δ^{109}Ag	^{109}Ag/^{107}Ag	NIST SRM 978a	AgNO_{3}	NIST SRM 978	0.929042(134)	Powell et al. (1981)	Link
Cadmium	Cd	δ^{114/110}Cd	^{114}Cd/^{110}Cd	NIST SRM 3108	solution	BAM Cd-I012	2.30108(296)	Pritzkow et al. (2007)	Link
Rhenium	Re	δ^{187}Re	^{187}Re/^{185}Re	NIST SRM 989	elemental Re	NIST SRM 989	1.67394(83)	Gramlich et al. (1973)	Link
Osmium	Os	δ^{187/188}Os	^{187}Os/^{188}Os	IAG-CRM-4	solution	K_{2}OsO_{4}	0.14833(93)	Völkening et al. (1991)	Link
Platinum	Pt	δ^{198/194}Pt	^{198}Pt/^{194}Pt	IRMM-010	elemental Pt	IRMM-010	0.22386(162)	Wolff Briche et al. (2002)	Link
Mercury	Hg	δ^{202/198}Hg	^{202}Hg/^{198}Hg	NRC NIMS-1	solution	NRC NIMS-1	2.96304(308)	Meija et al. (2010)	Link
Thallium	Tl	δ^{205}Tl	^{205}Tl/^{203}Tl	NRC SRM 997	elemental Tl	NIST SRM 997	2.38707(79)	Dunstan et al. (1980)	Link
Lead	Pb	δ^{208/206}Pb	^{208}Pb/^{206}Pb	ERM-3800	solution	NIST SRM 981	2.168099(624)	Catanzaro et al. (1968)	Link
Uranium	U	δ^{238/235}U	^{238}U/^{235}U	NIST SRM 950-A	uranium oxide	Namibian ore	137.802321(688638)	Richter et al. (1999)	Link

Table 8 gives the material and isotopic ratio defining the δ = 0 scale for each of the indicated elements. In addition, Table 8 lists the material with the 'best' measurement as determined by Meija et al. (2016). "Material" gives chemical formula, "Type of ratio" is the isotopic ratio reported in "Isotope ratio", and "Citation" gives the article(s) reporting the isotopic abundances on which the isotope ratio is based. The isotopic ratios reflect the results from individual analyses of absolute mass fraction, reported in the cited studies, aggregated in Meija et al. (2016), and manipulated to reach the reported ratios. Error was calculated as the square root of the sum of the squares of fractional reported errors.

==== Clumped isotopes ====
Clumped isotopes present a distinct set of challenges for isotopic reference materials. By convention the clumped isotope composition of CO_{2} liberated from CaCO_{3} (Δ_{47}) and CH_{4} (Δ_{18}/Δ_{^{13}CH3D}/Δ_{^{12}CH2D2}) are reported relative to a stochastic distribution of isotopes. That is, the ratio of a given isotopologue of a molecule with multiple isotopic substitutions against a reference isotopologue is reported normalized to that same abundance ratio where all isotopes are distributed randomly. In practice the chosen reference frame is almost always the isotopologue with no isotopic substitutions. This is ^{12}C^{16}O_{2} for carbon dioxide and ^{12}C^{1}H_{4} for methane. Standard isotopic reference materials are still required in clumped isotope analysis for measuring the bulk δ values of a sample, which are used to calculate the expected stochastic distribution and subsequently to infer clumped isotope temperatures. However, the clumped isotope composition of most samples are altered in the mass spectrometer during ionization, meaning that post-measurement data correction requires having measured materials of known clumped isotope composition. At a given temperature equilibrium thermodynamics predicts the distribution of isotopes among possible isotopologues, and these predictions can be calibrated experimentally. To generate a standard of known clumped isotope composition, current practice is to internally equilibrate analyte gas at high temperatures in the presence of a metal catalyst and assume that it has the Δ value predicted by equilibrium calculations. Developing isotopic reference materials specifically for clumped isotope analysis remains an ongoing goal of this rapidly developing field and was a major discussion topic during the 6th International Clumped Isotopes Workshop in 2017. It is possible that researchers in the future will measure clumped isotope ratios against internationally distributed reference materials, similar to the current method of measuring the bulk isotope composition of unknown samples.

== Certifying reference materials ==
=== Overview ===
The certification of isotopic reference materials is relatively complex. Like most aspects of reporting isotopic compositions it reflects a combination of historical artifacts and modern institutions. As a result, the details surrounding the certification of isotopic reference materials varies by element and chemical compound. As a general guideline, the isotopic composition of primary and original calibration reference materials were used to define the isotopic scales and so have no associated uncertainty. Updated calibration materials are generally certified by IAEA and important reference materials for two-point isotopic scales (SLAP, LSVEC) were reached through interlaboratory comparison. The isotopic composition of additional reference materials are either established through individual analytical facilities or through interlaboratory comparisons but often lack an official IAEA certification. There are certified values for most of the materials listed in Table 1, about half of the materials listed in Tables 2–7, and few of the materials in Table 8.

=== Primary and original calibrations ===
The agreed-upon isotopic composition of primary reference and the original calibration materials were generally not reached through interlaboratory comparison. In part this is simply because the original materials were used to the define the isotopic scales and so have no associated uncertainty. VSMOW serves as the primary reference and calibration material for the hydrogen isotope system and one of two possible scales for the oxygen isotope system, and was prepared by Harmon Craig. VSMOW2 is the replacement calibration standard and was calibrated by measurements at five selected laboratories. The isotopic composition of SLAP was reached through interlaboratory comparison. NBS-19 is the original calibration material for the carbon isotope scale made by I. Friedman, J. R. O’Neil and G. Cebula and is used to define the VPDB scale. IAEA-603 is the replacement calibration standard and was calibrated by measurements at three selected laboratories (GEOTOP-UQAM in Montreal, Canada; USGS in Reston, USA; MPI-BGC in Jena, Germany). The isotopic composition of LSVEC was reached through interlaboratory comparison. IAEA-S-1, the original calibration material for the sulfur isotope scale and still in use today, was prepared by B. W. Robinson.

=== International Atomic Energy Agency ===
IAEA issues official certificates of isotopic composition for most new calibration materials. The IAEA has certified isotopic values for VSMOW2/SLAP2 and IAEA-603 (the replacement for the NBS-19 CaCO_{3} standard). However, the isotopic composition of most reference materials distributed by IAEA are established in the scientific literature. For example, IAEA distributes the N isotope reference materials USGS34 (KNO_{3}) and USGS35 (NaNO_{3}), produced by a group of scientists at the USGS and reported in Böhlke et al. (2003), but has not certified the isotopic composition of these references. Moreover, the cited δ^{15}N and δ^{18}O values of these references were not reached through interlaboratory comparison. A second example is IAEA-SO-5, a BaSO_{4} reference material produced by R. Krouse and S. Halas and described in Halas & Szaran (2001). The value of this reference was reached through interlaboratory comparison but lacks IAEA certification. Other reference materials (LSVEV, IAEA-N3) were reached through interlaboratory comparison and are described by the IAEA but the status of their certification is unclear.

=== National Institute of Standards and Technology ===
As of 2018 NIST does not provide certificates for the common stable isotope reference materials. As seen at this link showing the light stable isotope references currently available from NIST, this category includes all of the isotopic references critical for isotopic measurement of hydrogen, carbon, oxygen, nitrogen, and sulfur. However, for most of these materials NIST does provide a report of investigation, which gives a reference value that is not certified (following the definitions of May et al. (2000)). For the above examples of USGS34 and USGS35, NIST reports reference values but has not certified the results of Böhlke et al. (2003). Conversely, NIST has not provided a reference value for IAEA-SO-5. As seen at this link, NIST does certify isotopic reference materials for non-traditional "heavy" isotopic systems including rubidium, nickel, strontium, gallium, and thallium, as well as several isotopic systems that would normally be characterized at "light" but non-traditional such as magnesium and chlorine. While the isotopic composition of several of these materials were certified in the mid-1960s, other materials were certified as recently as 2011 (for example, Boric Acid Isotopic Standard 951a).

== Uncertainty and error in reference materials ==
=== Uncertainty in absolute isotope ratios ===
Because many isotopic reference materials are defined relative to one another using the δ notation, there are few constraints on the absolute isotopic ratios of reference materials. For dual-inlet and continuous flow mass spectrometry uncertainty in the raw isotopic ratio is acceptable because samples are often measured through multi-collection and then compared directly with standards, with data in the published literature reported relative to the primary reference materials. In this case the actual measurement is of an isotope ratio and is rapidly converted to a ratio or ratios so the absolute isotope ratio is only minimally important for attaining high-accuracy measurements. However, the uncertainty in the raw isotopic ratio of reference materials is problematic for applications that do not directly measure mass-resolved ion beams. Measurements of isotope ratios through laser spectroscopy or nuclear magnetic resonance are sensitive to the absolute abundance of isotopes and uncertainty in the absolute isotopic ratio of a standard can limit measurement accuracy. It is possible that these techniques will ultimately be used to refine the isotope ratios of reference materials.

=== δ-scales with two anchoring reference materials ===
Measuring isotopic ratios by mass spectrometry includes multiple steps in which samples can undergo cross-contamination, including during sample preparation, leakage of gas through instrument valves, the generic category of phenomena called 'memory effects', and the introduction of blanks (foreign analyte measured as part of the sample). As a result of these instrument-specific effects the range in measured δ values can be lower than the true range in the original samples. To correct for such scale compression researchers calculate a "stretching factor" by measuring two isotopic reference materials (Coplen, 1988). For the hydrogen system the two reference materials are commonly VSMOW2 and SLAP2, where δ^{2}H_{VSMOW2} = 0 and δ^{2}H_{SLAP2} = -427.5 vs. VSMOW. If the measured difference between the two references is less than 427.5‰, all measured ^{2}H/^{1}H ratios are multiplied by the stretching factor required to bring the difference between the two reference materials in line with expectations. After this scaling, a factor is added to all measured isotopic ratios so that the reference materials attain their defined isotopic values. The carbon system also uses two anchoring reference materials (Coplen et al., 2006a; 2006b).

== See also ==
- Geochemistry
- Isotope
- Isotopologue
- Isotopomer
- Isotope analysis
- Isotopic signature
- Stable Isotope Ratio
- Isotope geochemistry
- Isotope-ratio mass spectrometry
- Isotope fractionation
- Mass (mass spectrometry)
- Isotopic labeling
- Isotopes of hydrogen
- Isotopes of carbon; δ^{13}C
- Isotopes of oxygen; δ^{18}O
- Isotopes of nitrogen; δ^{15}N
- Isotopes of sulfur; δ^{34}S
- Vienna Standard Mean Ocean Water
- Canyon Diablo
