= Clumped isotopes =

Heavy isotopes bonded to other heavy isotopes

Clumped isotopes are heavy isotopes that are bonded to other heavy isotopes. The relative abundance of clumped isotopes (and multiply substituted isotopologues) in molecules such as methane, nitrous oxide, and carbonate is an area of active investigation. The carbonate clumped-isotope thermometer, or "^{13}C–^{18}O order/disorder carbonate thermometer", is a new approach for paleoclimate reconstruction, based on the temperature dependence of the clumping of ^{13}C and ^{18}O into bonds within the carbonate mineral lattice. This approach has the advantage that the ^{18}O ratio in water is not necessary (different from the δ^{18}O approach), but for precise paleotemperature estimation, it also needs very large and uncontaminated samples, long analytical runs, and extensive replication. Commonly used sample sources for paleoclimatological work include corals, otoliths, gastropods, tufa, bivalves, and foraminifera. Results are usually expressed as Δ47 (said as "cap 47"), which is the deviation of the ratio of isotopologues of CO_{2} with a molecular weight of 47 to those with a weight of 44 from the ratio expected if they were randomly distributed.

== Background ==
=== Terminology ===
Molecules made of elements with multiple isotopes can vary in their isotopic composition; these variant molecules are called isotopologues. For example, isotopologues of carbon dioxide. Oxygen has three stable isotopes (^{16}O, ^{17}O and ^{18}O) and carbon has two (^{13}C, ^{12}C).A ^{12}C^{16}O_{2} molecule (containing only the most common isotope of each element) is called a monoisotopic species. When only one atom is replaced with a heavy isotope of the same element (e.g., ^{13}C^{16}O_{2}), it is called a singly substituted species. Likewise, when two atoms are simultaneously replaced with heavier isotopes (e.g., ^{13}C^{16}O^{18}O), then it is called a doubly substituted or multiply substituted isotopologue. The multiply substituted isotopologue ^{13}C^{18}O^{16}O contains a bond between two of these heavier isotopes (^{13}C and ^{18}O), which is a "clumped" isotope bond.

The abundance of masses for a given molecule (e.g. CO_{2}) can be predicted using the relative abundance of isotopes of its constituent atoms (^{13}C/^{12}C, ^{18}O/^{16}O and ^{17}O/^{16}O). The relative abundance of each isotopologue (e.g. mass-47 CO_{2}) is proportional to the relative abundance of each isotopic species.

^{47}R/^{44}R = (2×[^{13}C][^{18}O][^{16}O]+2×[^{12}C][^{18}O][^{17}O]+[^{13}C][^{17}O][^{17}O])/([^{12}C][^{16}O][^{16}O])

This predicted abundance assumes a non-biased stochastic distribution of isotopes, natural materials tend to deviate from these stochastic values, the study of which forms the basis of clumped isotope geochemistry.

When a heavier isotope substitutes for a lighter one (e.g., ^{18}O for ^{16}O), the chemical bond's vibration will be slower, lowering its zero-point energy. In other words, thermodynamic stability is related to the isotopic composition of the molecule.

^{12}C^{16}O_{3}^{2−} (≈98.2%), ^{13}C^{16}O_{3}^{2−} (≈1.1%), ^{12}C^{18}O^{16}O_{2}^{2−} (≈0.6%) and ^{12}C^{17}O^{16}O_{2}^{2−} (≈0.11%) are the most abundant isotopologues (≈99%) of carbonate ion, controlling the bulk δ^{13}C, δ^{17}O and δ^{18}O values in natural carbonate minerals. Each of these isopotologes has different thermodynamic stability. For a carbonate crystal at thermodynamic equilibrium, the relative abundances of the carbonate ion isotopologues is controlled by reactions such as:

^{13}C^{16}O_{3}^{2−} + ^{12}C^{18}O^{16}O_{2}^{2−} ⇌ ^{12}C^{16}O_{3}^{2−} + ^{13}C^{18}O^{16}O_{2}^{2−}	Reaction 1

The equilibrium constants for these reactions are temperature-dependent, with a tendency for heavy isotopes to "clump" with each other (increasing the proportions of multiply substituted isotopologues) as temperature decreases. Reaction 1 will be driven to the right with decreasing temperature, to the left with increasing temperature. Therefore, the equilibrium constant for this reaction can be used as a paleotemperature indicator, as long as the temperature dependence of this reaction and the relative abundances of the carbonate ion isotopologues are known.

== Differences from the conventional δ^{18}O analysis ==
In conventional δ^{18}O analysis, both the δ^{18}O values in carbonates and water are needed to estimate paleoclimate. However, for many times and places, the δ^{18}O in water can only be inferred, and also the ^{16}O/^{18}O ratio between carbonate and water may vary with the change in temperature. Therefore, the accuracy of the thermometer may be compromised.

Whereas for the carbonate clumped-isotope thermometer, the equilibrium is independent of the isotope compositions of waters from which carbonates grew. Therefore, the only information needed is the abundance of bonds between rare, heavy isotopes within the carbonate mineral.

== Methods ==
1. Extract CO_{2} from carbonates by reaction with anhydrous phosphoric acid. (there is no direct way to measure the abundance of CO_{3}^{2−} with high enough precision). The phosphoric acid temperature is often held between 25° and 90°C and can be as high as 110 °C.
2. Purify the CO_{2} that has been extracted. This step removes contaminant gases like hydrocarbons and halocarbons which can be removed by gas chromatography.
3. Mass spectrometric analyses of purified CO_{2}, to obtain δ^{13}C, δ^{18}O, and Δ47 (abundance of mass-47 CO_{2}) values. (Precision needs to be as high as ≈10^{−5}, for the isotope signals of interest are often less than ≈10^{−3}.)

== Applications ==
=== Paleoenvironment ===
Clumped isotopes analyses have traditionally been used in lieu of conventional δ^{18}O analyses when the δ^{18}O of seawater or source water is poorly constrained. While conventional δ^{18}O analysis solves for temperature as a function of both carbonate and water δ^{18}O, clumped isotope analyses can provide temperature estimates that are independent of the source water δ^{18}O. Δ47-derived temperature can then be used in conjunction with carbonate δ^{18}O to reconstruct δ^{18}O of the source water, thus providing information on the water with which the carbonate was equilibrated.

Clumped isotope analyses thus allow for estimates of two key environmental variables: temperature and water δ^{18}O. These variables are especially useful for reconstructing past climates, as they can provide information on a wide range of environmental properties. For example, temperature variability can imply changes in solar irradiance, greenhouse gas concentration, or albedo, while changes in water δ^{18}O can be used to estimate changes in ice volume, sea level, or rainfall intensity and location.

Studies have used temperatures derived from clumped isotopes for varied and numerous paleoclimate applications — to constrain δ^{18}O of past seawater, pinpoint the timing of icehouse-hothouse transitions, track changes in ice volume through an ice age, and to reconstruct temperature changes in ancient lake basins.

=== Paleoaltimetry ===
Clumped isotope analyses have recently been used to constrain the paleoaltitude or uplift history of a region. Air temperature decreases systematically with altitude throughout the troposphere (see lapse rate). Due to the close coupling between lake water temperature and air temperature, there is a similar decrease in lake water temperature as altitude increases. Thus, variation in water temperature implied by Δ47 could indicate changes in lake altitude, driven by tectonic uplift or subsidence. Two recent studies derive the timing of the uplift of the Andes Mountains and the Altiplano Plateau, citing sharp decreases in Δ47-derived temperatures as evidence of rapid tectonic uplift.

=== Atmospheric science ===
Measurements of Δ47 can be used to constrain natural and synthetic sources of atmospheric CO_{2}, (e.g. respiration and combustion), as each of these processes are associated with different average Δ47 temperatures of formation.

=== Paleobiology ===
Measurements of Δ47 can be used to better understand the physiology of extinct organisms, and to place constraints on the early development of endothermy, the process by which organisms regulate their body temperature. Prior to the development of clumped isotope analysis, there was no straightforward way to estimate either the body temperature or body water δ^{18}O of extinct animals. Eagle et al., 2010 measure Δ47 in bioapatite from a modern Indian elephant, white rhinoceros, Nile crocodile and American alligator. These animals were chosen as they span a wide range in internal body temperatures, allowing for the creation of a mathematical framework relating Δ47 of bioapatite and internal body temperature. This relationship has been applied to analyses of fossil teeth, in order to predict the body temperatures of a woolly mammoth and a sauropod dinosaur. The latest Δ47 temperature calibration for (bio)apatite of Löffler et al. 2019 covers a wide temperature range of 1-80°C and was applied to a fossil megalodon shark tooth for calculating seawater temperatures and δ^{18}O values.

=== Petrology and metamorphic alteration ===
A key premise of most clumped isotope analyses is that samples have retained their primary isotopic signatures. However, isotopic resetting or alteration, resulting from elevated temperature, can provide a different type of information about past climates. For example, when carbonate is isotopically reset by high temperatures, measurements of Δ47 can provide information about the duration and extent of metamorphic alteration. In one such study, Δ47 from late Neoproterozoic Doushantou cap carbonate is used to assess the temperature evolution of the lower crust in southern China.

=== Cosmochemistry ===
Primitive meteorites have been studied using measurements of Δ47. These analyses also assume that the primary isotopic signature of the sample has been lost. In this case, measurements of Δ47 instead provide information on the high-temperature event that isotopically reset the sample. Existing Δ47 analyses on primitive meteorites have been used to infer the duration and temperature of aqueous alteration events, as well as to estimate the isotopic composition of the alteration fluid.

=== Ore deposits ===
An emerging body of work highlights the application potential for clumped isotopes to reconstruct temperature and fluid properties in hydrothermal ore deposits. In mineral exploration, delineation of the heat footprint around an ore body provides critical insight into the processes that drive transport and deposition of metals. During proof of concept studies, clumped isotopes were used to provide accurate temperature reconstructions in epithermal, sediment hosted, and Mississippi Valley Type (MVT) deposits. These case studies are supported by measurement of carbonates in active geothermal settings.

== Limitations ==
The temperature dependent relationship is subtle (−0.0005%/°C).

^{13}C^{18}O^{16}O_{2}^{2−} is a rare isotopologue (≈60 ppm [3]).

Therefore, to obtain adequate precision, this approach requires long analyses (≈2–3 hours) and very large and uncontaminated samples.

Clumped isotope analyses assume that measured Δ47 is composed of ^{13}C^{18}O^{16}O_{2}^{2−}, the most common isotopologue of mass 47. Corrections to account for less common isotopologues of mass 47 (e.g. ^{12}C^{18}O^{17}O ^{16}O^{2−}) are not completely standardized between labs.

== See also ==
- δ^{18}O
- δ^{15}N
- δ^{13}C
- Paleothermometer
- Isotopic signature
- Isotope analysis
- Isotope geochemistry
- Isotopic labeling
