= UCLA Meteorite Collection =

Museum in Los Angeles, California, USA

Coordinates: 34.069°N 118.441°W

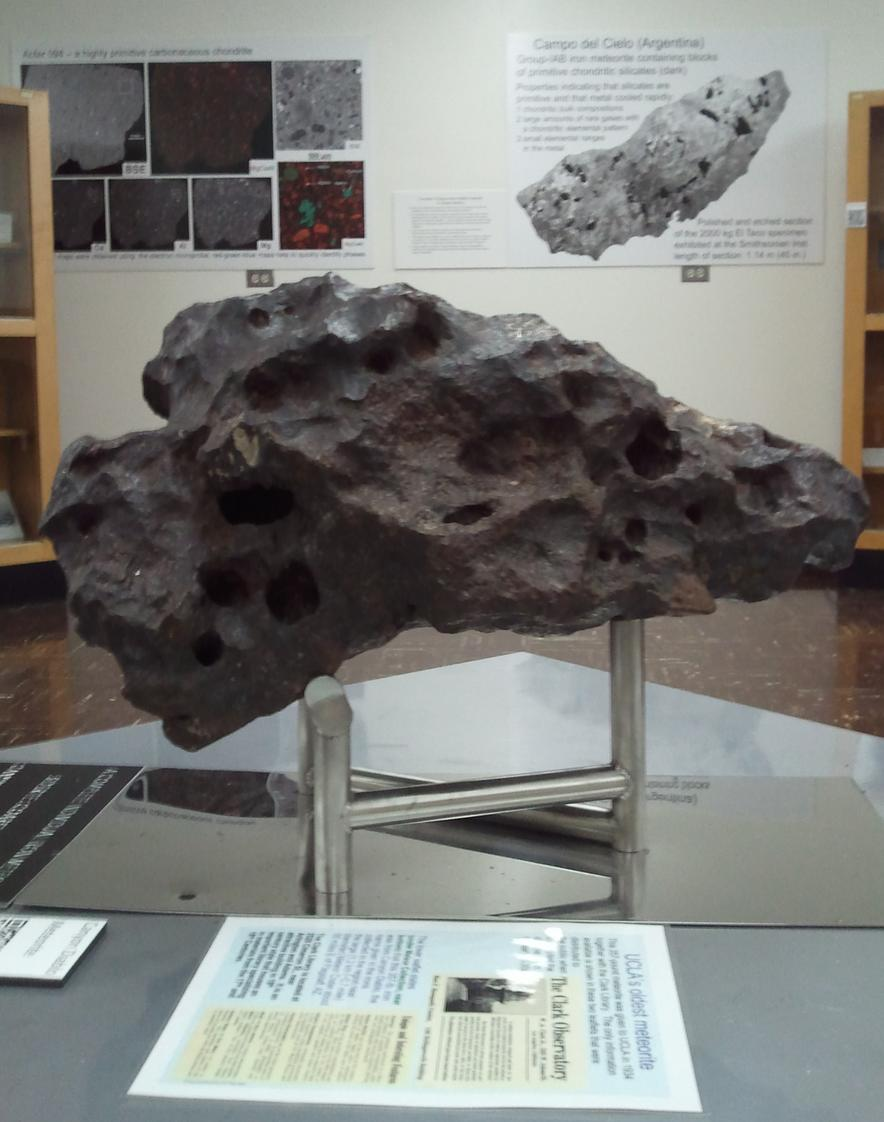
Photo of the 162 kilograms (357 lb) Clark Iron in the UCLA meteorite museum.

The UCLA Collection of Meteorites is one of the largest meteorite collections in the United States. It is housed in the Geology Building at the University of California, Los Angeles. The collection of meteorites began in 1934 when William Andrews Clark, Jr. donated a 357-pound (162 kg) fragment of the Canyon Diablo meteorite, now known as the Clark Iron. Over time, the collection grew to include over 2,400 samples from about 1,500 different meteorites. The collection holds forty mostly complete meteorites. A museum exhibiting 100 specimens from the larger collection opened to the public in 2013, with a grand opening in January 2014.
