= Isotopic signature =

Mathematical ratio used in analysis of radioactive materials

An isotopic signature (also isotopic fingerprint) is a ratio of non-radiogenic stable isotopes, stable radiogenic isotopes, or unstable radioactive isotopes of particular elements in an investigated material. The ratios of isotopes in a sample material are measured by isotope-ratio mass spectrometry against an isotopic reference material. This process is called isotope analysis.

== Stable isotopes ==
The atomic mass of different isotopes affect their chemical kinetic behavior, leading to natural isotope separation processes.

=== Carbon isotopes ===
Algal group	δ^{13}C range
HCO_{3}-using red algae	−22.5‰ to −9.6‰
CO_{2}-using red algae	−34.5‰ to −29.9‰
Brown algae	−20.8‰ to −10.5‰
Green algae	−20.3‰ to −8.8‰

For example, different sources and sinks of methane have different affinity for the ^{12}C and ^{13}C isotopes, which allows distinguishing between different sources by the ^{13}C/^{12}C ratio in methane in the air. In geochemistry, paleoclimatology and paleoceanography this ratio is called δ^{13}C. The ratio is calculated with respect to Pee Dee Belemnite (PDB) standard:

$\delta \ce{^{13}C}_\mathrm{sample} = \left(\frac{\ce{^{13}C/^{12}C}_\ce{sample}}{\ce{^{13}C/^{12}C}_\mathrm{standard}} - 1\right) \cdot 1000$ ‰

Similarly, carbon in inorganic carbonates shows little isotopic fractionation, while carbon in materials originated by photosynthesis is depleted of the heavier isotopes. In addition, there are two types of plants with different biochemical pathways; the C_{3} carbon fixation, where the isotope separation effect is more pronounced, C_{4} carbon fixation, where the heavier ^{13}C is less depleted, and Crassulacean Acid Metabolism (CAM) plants, where the effect is similar but less pronounced than with C_{4} plants. Isotopic fractionation in plants is caused by physical (slower diffusion of ^{13}C in plant tissues due to increased atomic weight) and biochemical (preference of ^{12}C by two enzymes: RuBisCO and phosphoenolpyruvate carboxylase) factors. The different isotope ratios for the two kinds of plants propagate through the food chain, thus it is possible to determine if the principal diet of a human or an animal consists primarily of C_{3} plants (rice, wheat, soybeans, potatoes) or C_{4} plants (corn, or corn-fed beef) by isotope analysis of their flesh and bone collagen (however, to obtain more accurate determinations, carbon isotopic fractionation must be also taken into account, since several studies have reported significant ^{13}C discrimination during biodegradation of simple and complex substrates). Within C_{3} plants processes regulating changes in δ^{13}C are well understood, particularly at the leaf level, but also during wood formation. Many recent studies combine leaf level isotopic fractionation with annual patterns of wood formation (i.e. tree ring δ^{13}C) to quantify the impacts of climatic variations and atmospheric composition on physiological processes of individual trees and forest stands. The next phase of understanding, in terrestrial ecosystems at least, seems to be the combination of multiple isotopic proxies to decipher interactions between plants, soils and the atmosphere, and predict how changes in land use will affect climate change. Similarly, marine fish contain more ^{13}C than freshwater fish, with values approximating the C_{4} and C_{3} plants respectively.

The ratio of carbon-13 and carbon-12 isotopes in these types of plants is as follows:

- C_{4} plants: −16‰ to −10‰
- CAM plants: −20‰ to −10‰
- C_{3} plants: −33‰ to −24‰

Limestones formed by precipitation in seas from the atmospheric carbon dioxide contain normal proportion of ^{13}C. Conversely, calcite found in salt domes originates from carbon dioxide formed by oxidation of petroleum, which due to its plant origin is ^{13}C-depleted. The layer of limestone deposited at the Permian extinction 252 Mya can be identified by the 1% drop in ^{13}C/^{12}C.

=== Nitrogen isotopes ===
Nitrogen-15, or ^{15}N, is often used in agricultural and medical research, for example in the Meselson–Stahl experiment to establish the nature of DNA replication. An extension of this research resulted in development of DNA-based stable-isotope probing, which allows examination of links between metabolic function and taxonomic identity of microorganisms in the environment, without the need for culture isolation. Proteins can be isotopically labelled by cultivating them in a medium containing ^{15}N as the only source of nitrogen, e.g., in quantitative proteomics such as SILAC.

Nitrogen-15 is extensively used to trace mineral nitrogen compounds (particularly fertilizers) in the environment. When combined with the use of other isotopic labels, ^{15}N is also a very important tracer for describing the fate of nitrogenous organic pollutants. Nitrogen-15 tracing is an important method used in biogeochemistry.

The ratio of stable nitrogen isotopes, ^{15}N/^{14}N or δ^{15}N, tends to increase with trophic level, such that herbivores have higher nitrogen isotope values than plants, and carnivores have higher nitrogen isotope values than herbivores. Depending on the tissue being examined, there tends to be an increase of 3-4 parts per thousand with each increase in trophic level. The tissues and hair of vegans therefore contain significantly lower δ^{15}N than the bodies of people who eat mostly meat. Similarly, a terrestrial diet produces a different signature than a marine-based diet. Isotopic analysis of hair is an important source of information for archaeologists, providing clues about the ancient diets and differing cultural attitudes to food sources.

A number of other environmental and physiological factors can influence the nitrogen isotopic composition at the base of the food web (i.e. in plants) or at the level of individual animals. For example, in arid regions, the nitrogen cycle tends to be more 'open' and prone to the loss of ^{14}N, increasing δ^{15}N in soils and plants. This leads to relatively high δ^{15}N values in plants and animals in hot and arid ecosystems relative to cooler and moister ecosystems. Furthermore, elevated δ^{15}N have been linked to the preferential excretion of 14N and reutilization of already enriched 15N tissues in the body under prolonged water stress conditions or insufficient protein intake.

δ^{15}N also provides a diagnostic tool in planetary science as the ratio exhibited in atmospheres and surface materials "is closely tied to the conditions under which materials form".

=== Oxygen isotopes ===
Oxygen occurs naturally in three variants, but ^{17}O is so rare that it is very difficult to detect (~0.04% abundant). The ratio of ^{18}O/^{16}O in water depends on the amount of evaporation the water experienced (as ^{18}O is heavier and therefore less likely to vaporize). As the vapor tension depends on the concentration of dissolved salts, the ^{18}O/^{16}O ratio shows correlation on the salinity and temperature of water. As oxygen is incorporated into the shells of calcium carbonate-secreting organisms, such sediments provide a chronological record of temperature and salinity of the water in the area.

The oxygen isotope ratio in the atmosphere varies predictably with time of year and geographic location; e.g. there is a 2% difference between ^{18}O-rich precipitation in Montana and ^{18}O-depleted precipitation in Florida Keys. This variability can be used for approximate determination of geographic location of origin of a material; e.g. it is possible to determine where a shipment of uranium oxide was produced. The rate of exchange of surface isotopes with the environment has to be taken in account.

The oxygen isotopic signatures of solid samples (organic and inorganic) are usually measured with pyrolysis and mass spectrometry. Improper or prolonged storage of samples can lead to inaccurate measurements.

=== Sulfur Isotopes ===
Sulfur has four stable isotopes, ^{32}S, ^{33}S, ^{34}S, and ^{36}S, of which ^{32}S is the most abundant by a large margin due to the fact it is created by the very common ^{12}C in supernovas. Sulfur isotope ratios are almost always expressed as ratios relative to ^{32}S due to this major relative abundance (95.0%). Sulfur isotope fractionations are usually measured in terms of δ^{34}S due to its higher abundance (4.25%) compared to the other stable isotopes of sulfur, though δ^{33}S is also sometimes measured. Differences in sulfur isotope ratios are thought to exist primarily due to kinetic fractionation during reactions and transformations.

Sulfur isotopes are generally measured against standards; prior to 1993, the Canyon Diablo troilite standard (abbreviated to CDT), which has a ^{32}S:^{34}S equal to 22.220, was used as both a reference material and the zero point for the isotopic scale. Since 1993, the Vienna-CDT standard has been used as a zero point, and there are several materials used as reference materials for sulfur isotope measurements. Sulfur fractionations by natural processes measured against these standards have been shown to exist between −72‰ and +147‰, as calculated by the following equation:

$$\delta \ce{^{34}S}_\mathrm{sample} = \left(\frac{\ce{^{34}S/^{32}S}_\ce{sample}}{\ce{^{34}S/^{32}S}_\mathrm{standard}} - 1\right) \cdot 1000$$

Natural sulfur isotope values
Natural Source	δ^{34}S range
Petroleum	−32‰ to −8‰
River water	−8‰ to 10‰
Lunar rocks	−2‰ to 2.5‰
Meteorites	0‰ to 2‰
Ocean water	17‰ to 20‰

Most relevant isotopes of sulfur
Isotope	Abundance	Half-life
^{32}S	94.99%	Stable
^{33}S	0.75%	Stable
^{34}S	4.25%	Stable
^{35}S	<0.1%	87.4 days
^{36}S	0.01%	Stable

As a very redox-active element, sulfur can be useful for recording major chemistry-altering events throughout Earth's history, such as marine evaporites which reflect the change in the atmosphere's redox state brought about by the Oxygen Crisis.

== Radiogenic isotopes ==
=== Lead isotopes ===
Lead consists of four stable isotopes: ^{204}Pb, ^{206}Pb, ^{207}Pb, and ^{208}Pb. Local variations in uranium/thorium/lead content cause a wide location-specific variation of isotopic ratios for lead from different localities. Lead emitted to the atmosphere by industrial processes has an isotopic composition different from lead in minerals. Combustion of gasoline with tetraethyllead additive led to formation of ubiquitous micrometer-sized lead-rich particulates in car exhaust smoke; especially in urban areas the man-made lead particles are much more common than natural ones. The differences in isotopic content in particles found in objects can be used for approximate geolocation of the object's origin.

== Radioactive isotopes ==
The ^{14}C isotope is important in distinguishing between materials made from modern sources of carbon and ancient sources of carbon. Cosmic rays transform ^{14}N to radioactive ^{14}C, which subsequently decays over the course of tens of thousands of years. Shielded from cosmic radiation underground, fossil fuels like coal or petroleum exhibit ^{14}C levels below detectable limits. However, carbon circulating in the surface biosphere maintains a measurable amount of ^{14}C. Thus, materials synthesized from fossil fuel sources can be differentiated from those made with modern materials by the absence/presence of ^{14}C. Federal regulators use this technique to encourage and monitor the incorporation of renewable biofeedstocks into transportation fuels.

Hot particles, radioactive particles of nuclear fallout and radioactive waste, also exhibit distinct isotopic signatures. Their radionuclide composition (and thus their age and origin) can be determined by mass spectrometry or by gamma spectrometry. For example, particles generated by a nuclear blast contain detectable amounts of ^{60}Co and ^{152}Eu. The Chernobyl accident did not release these particles but did release ^{125}Sb and ^{144}Ce. Particles from underwater bursts will consist mostly of irradiated sea salts. Ratios of ^{152}Eu/^{155}Eu, ^{154}Eu/^{155}Eu, and ^{238}Pu/^{239}Pu are also different for fusion and fission nuclear weapons, which allows identification of hot particles of unknown origin.

Uranium has a relatively constant isotope ratio in all natural samples with ~0.72% ^{235}U, some 55 ppm ^{234}U (in secular equilibrium with its parent nuclide ^{238}U), and the balance made up by ^{238}U. Isotopic compositions that diverge significantly from those values are evidence for the uranium having been subject to depletion or enrichment in some fashion or of (part of it) having participated in a nuclear fission reaction. While the latter is almost as universally due to human influence as the former two, the natural nuclear fission reactor at Oklo, Gabon was detected through a significant diversion of ^{235}U concentration in samples from Oklo compared to those of all other known deposits on earth. Given that ^{235}U is a material of proliferation concern then as now every IAEA-approved supplier of Uranium fuel keeps track of the isotopic composition of uranium to ensure none is diverted for nefarious purposes. It would thus become apparent quickly if another Uranium deposit besides Oklo proves to have once been a natural nuclear fission reactor.

== Applications ==
=== Archaeological studies ===
In archaeological studies, stable isotope ratios have been used to track diet within the time span formation of analyzed tissues (10–15 years for bone collagen and intra-annual periods for tooth enamel bioapatite) from individuals; "recipes" of foodstuffs (ceramic vessel residues); locations of cultivation and types of plants grown (chemical extractions from sediments); and migration of individuals (dental material).

=== Forensics ===
With the advent of stable isotope ratio mass spectrometry, isotopic signatures of materials find increasing use in forensics, distinguishing the origin of otherwise similar materials and tracking the materials to their common source. For example, the isotope signatures of plants can be to a degree influenced by the growth conditions, including moisture and nutrient availability. In case of synthetic materials, the signature is influenced by the conditions during the chemical reaction. The isotopic signature profiling is useful in cases where other kinds of profiling, e.g. characterization of impurities, are not optimal. Electronics coupled with scintillator detectors are routinely used to evaluate isotope signatures and identify unknown sources.

A study was published demonstrating the possibility of determination of the origin of a common brown PSA packaging tape by using the carbon, oxygen, and hydrogen isotopic signature of the backing polymer, additives, and adhesive.

Measurement of carbon isotopic ratios can be used for detection of adulteration of honey. Addition of sugars originated from corn or sugar cane (C_{4} plants) skews the isotopic ratio of sugars present in honey, but does not influence the isotopic ratio of proteins; in an unadulterated honey the carbon isotopic ratios of sugars and proteins should match. As low as 7% level of addition can be detected.

Nuclear explosions form ^{10}Be by a reaction of fast neutrons with ^{13}C in the carbon dioxide in air. This is one of the historical indicators of past activity at nuclear test sites.

=== Solar System origins ===
Isotopic fingerprints are used to study the origin of materials in the Solar System. For example, the Moon's oxygen isotopic ratios seem to be essentially identical to Earth's. Oxygen isotopic ratios, which may be measured very precisely, yield a unique and distinct signature for each Solar System body. Different oxygen isotopic signatures can indicate the origin of material ejected into space. The Moon's titanium isotope ratio (^{50}Ti/^{47}Ti) appears close to the Earth's (within 4 ppm). In 2013, a study was released that indicated water in lunar magma was 'indistinguishable' from carbonaceous chondrites and nearly the same as Earth's, based on the composition of water isotopes.

=== Records of early life on Earth ===
Isotope biogeochemistry has been used to investigate the timeline surrounding life and its earliest iterations on Earth. Isotopic fingerprints typical of life, preserved in sediments, have been used to suggest, but do not necessarily prove, that life was already in existence on Earth by 3.85 billion years ago.

Sulfur isotope evidence has also been used to corroborate the timing of the Great Oxidation Event, during which the Earth's atmosphere experienced a measurable rise in oxygen (to about 9% of modern values) for the first time about 2.3–2.4 billion years ago. Mass-independent sulfur isotope fractionations are found to be widespread in the geologic record before about 2.45 billion years ago, and these isotopic signatures have since ceded to mass-dependent fractionation, providing strong evidence that the atmosphere shifted from anoxic to oxygenated at that threshold.

Modern sulfate-reducing bacteria are known to favorably reduce lighter ^{32}S instead of ^{34}S, and the presence of these microorganisms can measurably alter the sulfur isotope composition of the ocean. Because the δ^{34}S values of sulfide minerals is primarily influenced by the presence of sulfate-reducing bacteria, the absence of sulfur isotope fractionations in sulfide minerals suggests the absence of these bacterial processes or the absence of freely available sulfate. Some have used this knowledge of microbial sulfur fractionation to suggest that minerals (namely pyrite) with large sulfur isotope fractionations relative to the inferred seawater composition may be evidence of life. This claim is not clear-cut, however, and is sometimes contested using geologic evidence from the ~3.49 Ga sulfide minerals found in the Dresser Formation of Western Australia, which are found to have δ^{34}S values as negative as −22‰. Because it has not been proven that the sulfide and barite minerals formed in the absence of major hydrothermal input, it is not conclusive evidence of life or of the microbial sulfate reduction pathway in the Archean.

== See also ==
- Isoscapes
- Isotope electrochemistry
- Isotope geochemistry
- Radiometric dating
