= Canyon Diablo (meteorite) =

Iron meteorite from Meteor Crater used as sulfur isotopic reference material

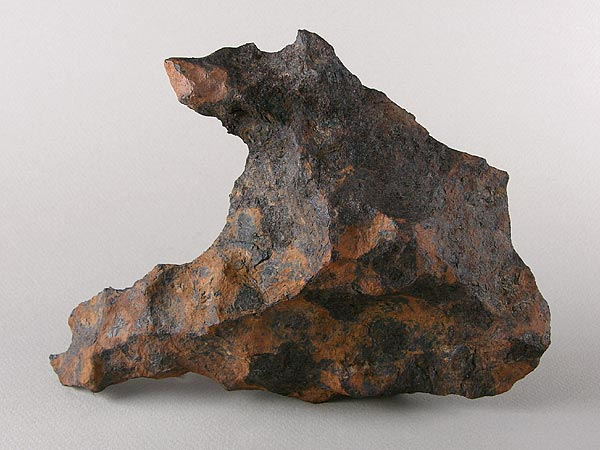
- Canyon Diablo iron meteorite fragment (IAB) 2,641 grams
- Type: Iron
- Structural classification: Coarse Octahedrite
- Group: IAB-MG
- Composition: 7.1% Ni; 0.46% Co; 0.26% P; 1% C; 1% S; 80ppm Ga; 320ppm Ge; 1,9ppm Ir
- Country: United States
- Region: Coconino County, Arizona
- Coordinates: 35°03′N 111°02′W
- Observed fall: No
- Fall date: 49000 years ago
- Found date: 1891
- TKW: 30 tonnes
- Strewn field: Yes
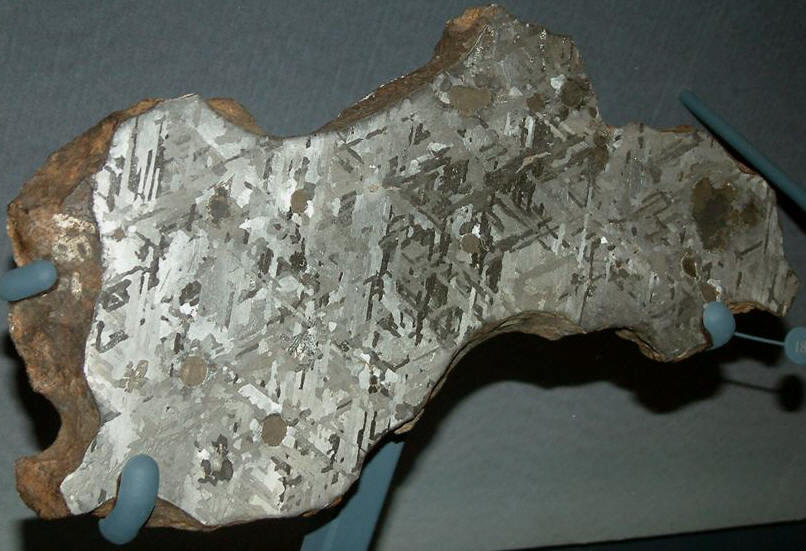
- Etched slice showing a Widmanstätten pattern
- Related media on Wikimedia Commons

The Canyon Diablo meteorite refers to the many fragments of the approximately 50 m (160 ft) diameter asteroid that created Meteor Crater (also called Barringer Crater), Arizona, United States. Meteorites have been found around the crater rim, and were named in 1891 by convention for the closest post office, Canyon Diablo, Arizona. The actual canyon lies about 2.5 miles west of the crater in the westernmost part of the strewn field.

== History ==
The impactor fell about 50,000 years ago. Initially known and used by pre-historic Native Americans, Canyon Diablo meteorites have been collected and studied by the scientific community since the 19th century. Meteor Crater, from the late 19th to the early 20th century, was the center of a long dispute over the origin of craters that showed little evidence of volcanism. That debate was largely settled by the early 1930s, thanks to work by Daniel M. Barringer, F.R. Moulton, and Harvey Harlow Nininger.

In 1953, Clair Cameron Patterson measured ratios of the lead isotopes in samples of the meteorite. Through U-Pb radiometric dating, a refined estimate of the age of the Earth was obtained, of 4.550 billion years, ± 70 million years.

== Composition and classification ==
This meteorite is an iron octahedrite (coarse octahedrite). Minerals reported from the meteorite include:

- Cohenite – iron carbide
- Chromite – iron magnesium chromium oxide
- Daubréelite – iron(II) chromium sulfide
- Diamond and lonsdaleite – carbon
- Graphite – carbon
- Haxonite – iron nickel carbide
- Kamacite iron nickel alloy – the most common component.
- Base metal sulfides
- Schreibersite – iron nickel phosphide
- Taenite – iron nickel alloy
- Troilite – a variety of the iron sulfide mineral pyrrhotite. The troilite in this sample is used as the standard reference for sulfur isotope ratios.
- Moissanite – a variety of silicon carbide, the second hardest natural mineral.

Samples may contain troilite-graphite nodules with metal veins and small diamonds.

== Fragments ==
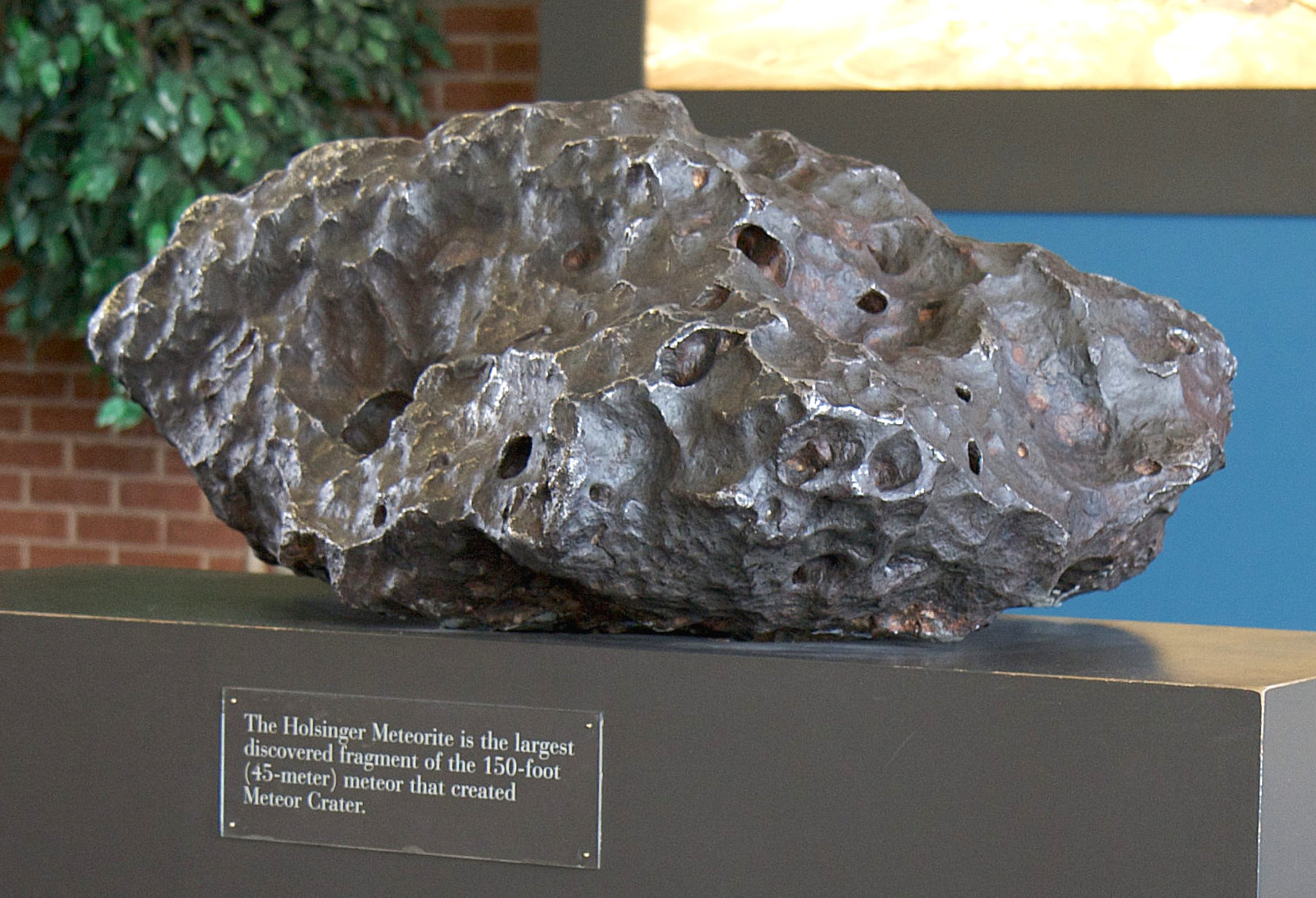
"Holsinger Meteorite", the biggest recovered fragment of the Canyon Diablo meteorite

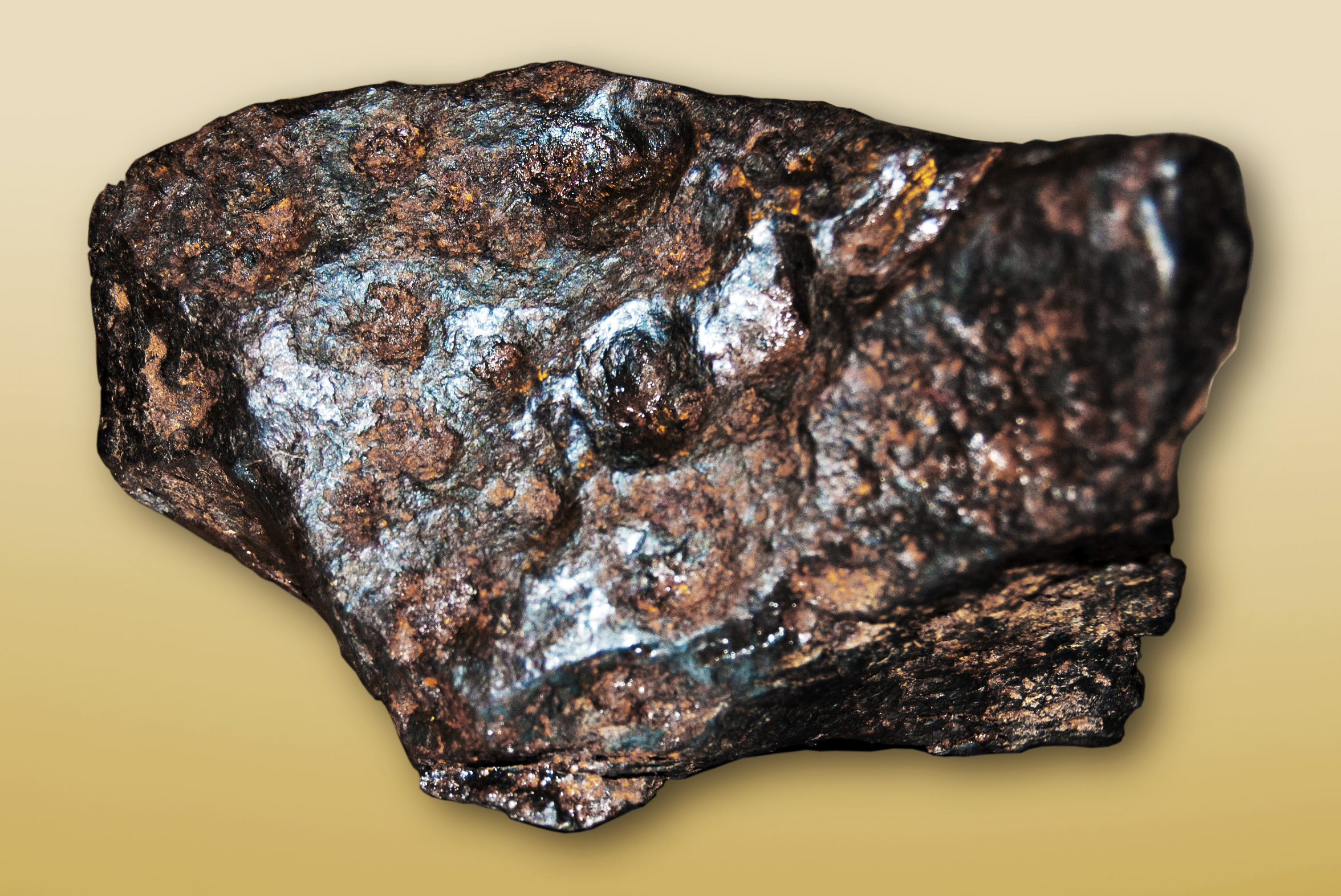
Example of a small (90mm) fragment of the meteorite

The biggest fragment ever found is the Holsinger Meteorite, weighing 639 kilograms (1,409 lb), now on display in the Meteor Crater Visitor Center on the rim of the crater. Other famous fragments:

- 485 kilograms (1,069 lb), Canterbury Museum, Christchurch, New Zealand. The largest fragment outside the United States.
- 360 kilograms (790 lb), Muséum national d'Histoire naturelle, Paris, France.
- 283.5 kilograms (625 lb), Archenhold Observatory, Berlin, Germany.
- 242.6 kilograms (535 lb), Lowell Observatory in Flagstaff, Arizona.
- 226.8 kilograms (500 lb), MINES ParisTech Mineralogy Museum, Paris School of Mines, France.
- 225.9 kilograms (498 lb), Academy of Natural Sciences of Drexel University, Philadelphia, Pennsylvania.
- 194 kilograms (428 lb), Beloit College, Beloit, Wisconsin.
- 179 kilograms (395 lb), Griffith Observatory, Los Angeles, California.
- 169 kilograms (373 lb), Van Vleck Observatory, Wesleyan University, Middletown, Connecticut.
- 162 kilograms (357 lb), "Clark Iron," Meteorite Gallery, University of California, Los Angeles.
- 145 kilograms (320 lb), Geology Museum, University of Wisconsin, Madison, Wisconsin.
- 136 kilograms (300 lb), Franklin Institute, Philadelphia.
- 122 kilograms (269 lb), Griffith Observatory, Los Angeles, California. Fragment loaned by the Geology Department of Pomona College.
- 100 kilograms (220 lb), California Academy of Sciences, San Francisco.
- 82 kilograms (181 lb), Trinity University, San Antonio, Texas.
- 54 kilograms (119 lb), Newark Museum, Newark, New Jersey.
- 46 kilograms (101 lb), Branner Library, Stanford University, Stanford, California.
- 28 kilograms (62 lb), Peoria Riverfront Museum, Dome Planetarium, Peoria, Illinois.
- 22 kilograms (49 lb), Basket Meteorite, Meteor Crater Museum, Arizona.
- 19 kilograms (42 lb), Wagner Free Institute of Science, Philadelphia.
- 2,750 gm (6 lb). Ralph Glasser MD, Evergreen CO.
- 266 grams (9.4 oz), Laurence Edward Oram, Phoenix, Arizona
- 82 grams (2.8 oz), Peter H. D. McKee, Seattle, Washington
- 69.2 grams (2.44 oz), Robert Tullman, St. Petersburg, Florida.

== See also ==
- Glossary of meteoritics
- δ ^{34}S
- Reference materials for stable isotope analysis
