= Δ13C =

Measure of relative carbon-13 concentration in a sample

In geochemistry, paleoclimatology, archaeology, and paleoceanography, δ^{13}C (pronounced "delta carbon thirteen") is a normalized ratio of the two stable isotopes of carbon—^{13}C and ^{12}C—reported in parts per thousand (per mille, ‰).

The definition is, in per mille:

$$\delta \ce{^{13}C} = \left( \frac{(\ce{^{13}C}/\ce{^{12}C})_\mathrm{sample}}{(\ce{^{13}C}/\ce{^{12}C})_\mathrm{standard}} - 1 \right) \times 1000$$

where the standard is an established reference material.

The δ^{13}C of a given compound can vary based on the sources of the precursor material and the biogeochemical processes it has undergone. For example, carbon dioxide derived from ecosystem respiration can be differentiated from carbon dioxide formed from the combustion of fossil fuels using δ^{13}C, as the precursor materials (modern organic matter and petroleum, respectively) have different isotopic values – the basis of the "Suess effect". In the case of photosynthesis, two plants grown adjacently with the same source of carbon dioxide may be isotopically distinguishable due to differing biochemical mechanisms and physiologies preferentially selecting for a given isotope—a process known as "isotopic fractionation".

== Reference standard ==
Reference standards are used for verifying the accuracy of isotope ratio measurements, which are typically performed via isotope ratio mass spectrometry, cavity ring down spectroscopy, tunable laser absorption spectroscopy, or nuclear magnetic resonance.

The initial reference material used to standardize carbon isotope ratios was the "Pee Dee Belemnite" (PDB)—a Cretaceous marine fossil, Belemnitella americana, originating from the Peedee Formation in South Carolina. This material had an anomalously high ^{13}C/^{12}C ratio (0.0112372), and was established as δ^{13}C value of zero.

Due to the high demand for the PDB standard, the supply was ultimately exhausted. Other standards calibrated to the same ratio, including one known as VPDB (for "Vienna PDB"), have replaced the original. The ^{13}C/^{12}C ratio for VPDB, which the International Atomic Energy Agency (IAEA) defines as a δ^{13}C value of zero is 0.011113. The use of different primary reference standards will result in isotope ratios that are incomparable due to the difference in scales. To avoid confusion, isotope ratio measurements typically include a subscript denoting the reference material it was corrected to, such as δ^{13}C_{PDB} or δ^{13}C_{VPDB}.

To prevent the depletion of the supply of VPDB, secondary reference materials with isotope ratios determined in direct comparison to VPDB, such as NBS-19 (available from the National Institute of Standards and Technology, δ^{13}C_{VPDB} = 1.95‰), are commonly used in the laboratory setting for standardizing measurements.

== Causes of δ^{13}C variations ==
Methane has a very light δ^{13}C signature: biogenic methane of −60‰, thermogenic methane −40‰. The release of large amounts of methane clathrate can affect global δ^{13}C values, as at the Paleocene–Eocene Thermal Maximum.

More commonly, the ratio is affected by variations in primary productivity and organic burial. Organisms preferentially take up light ^{12}C, and have a δ^{13}C signature of about −25‰, depending on their metabolic pathway. Therefore, an increase in δ^{13}C in marine fossils is indicative of an increase in the abundance of vegetation.

An increase in primary productivity causes a corresponding rise in δ^{13}C values as more ^{12}C is locked up in plants. This signal is also a function of the amount of carbon burial; when organic carbon is buried, more ^{12}C is locked out of the system in sediments than the background ratio.

Oxygen levels can also impact δ^{13}C ratios, as unusually positive δ^{13}C ratios in the Mesozoic have been speculated to have resulted from differences in carbon isotope fractionation in resin-producing plants under the lower oxygen levels of the Mesozoic.

== Geologic significance ==
C_{3} and C_{4} plants have different signatures, allowing the abundance of C_{4} grasses to be detected through time in the δ^{13}C record. Whereas C_{4} plants have a δ^{13}C of −16 to −10‰, C_{3} plants have a δ^{13}C of −33 to −24‰.

=== Positive and negative excursions ===
Positive δ^{13}C excursions are interpreted as an increase in burial of organic carbon in sedimentary rocks following either a spike in primary productivity, a drop in decomposition under anoxic ocean conditions or both. For example, the evolution of large land plants in the late Devonian led to increased organic carbon burial and consequently a rise in δ^{13}C.

== Major excursion events ==
- Lomagundi-Jatuli event (2,300–2,080 Ma) Paleoproterozoic - Positive excursion
- Shunga-Francevillian event (2,080 Ma) Paleoproterozoic - Negative excursion
- Shuram-Wonoka excursion (570–551 Ma) Neoproterozoic - Negative excursion
- Steptoean positive carbon isotope excursion (494.6-492 Ma) Paleozoic - Positive excursion
- Ireviken event (433.4 Ma) Paleozoic - Positive excursion
- Mulde event (427 Ma) Paleozoic - Positive excursion
- Lau event (424 Ma) Paleozoic - Positive excursion
- Cenomanian-Turonian boundary event (93.9 Ma) Mesozoic - Positive excursion
- Paleocene–Eocene Thermal Maximum (55.5 Ma) Cenozoic - Negative excursion

== See also ==
- δ^{18}O
- δ^{15}N
- δ^{34}S
- Isotopic signature
- Isotope analysis
- Isotope geochemistry
- Isotopic labeling
