= Δ34S =

Measure of the deviation in the ratio of stable isotopes sulfur-34 and sulfur-32

The δ^{34}S (pronounced delta 34 S) value is a standardized method for reporting measurements of the ratio of two stable isotopes of sulfur, ^{34}S:^{32}S, in a sample against the equivalent ratio in a known reference standard. The most commonly used standard is Vienna-Canyon Diablo Troilite (VCDT). Results are reported as variations from the standard ratio in parts per thousand, per mil or per mille, using the ‰ symbol. Heavy and light sulfur isotopes fractionate at different rates and the resulting δ^{34}S values, recorded in marine sulfate or sedimentary sulfides, have been studied and interpreted as records of the changing sulfur cycle throughout the earth's history.

== Calculation ==
Of the 25 known isotopes of sulfur, four are stable. In order of their abundance, those isotopes are ^{32}S (94.93%), ^{34}S (4.29%), ^{33}S (0.76%), and ^{36}S (0.02%). The δ^{34}S value refers to a measure of the ratio of the two most common stable sulfur isotopes, ^{34}S:^{32}S, as measured in a sample against that same ratio as measured in a known reference standard. The lowercase delta character is used by convention, to be consistent with use in other areas of stable isotope chemistry. That value can be calculated in per mil (‰, parts per thousand) as:

$\delta \ce{^{34}S} = \left( \frac{\left( \frac\ce{^{34}S}\ce{^{32}S} \right)_\mathrm{sample}}{\left( \frac\ce{^{34}S}\ce{^{32}S} \right)_\mathrm{standard}} - 1 \right) \times 1000$ ‰

Less commonly, if the appropriate isotope abundances are measured, similar formulae can be used to quantify ratio variations between ^{33}S and ^{32}S, and ^{36}S and ^{32}S, reported as δ^{33}S and δ^{36}S, respectively.

=== Reference standard ===
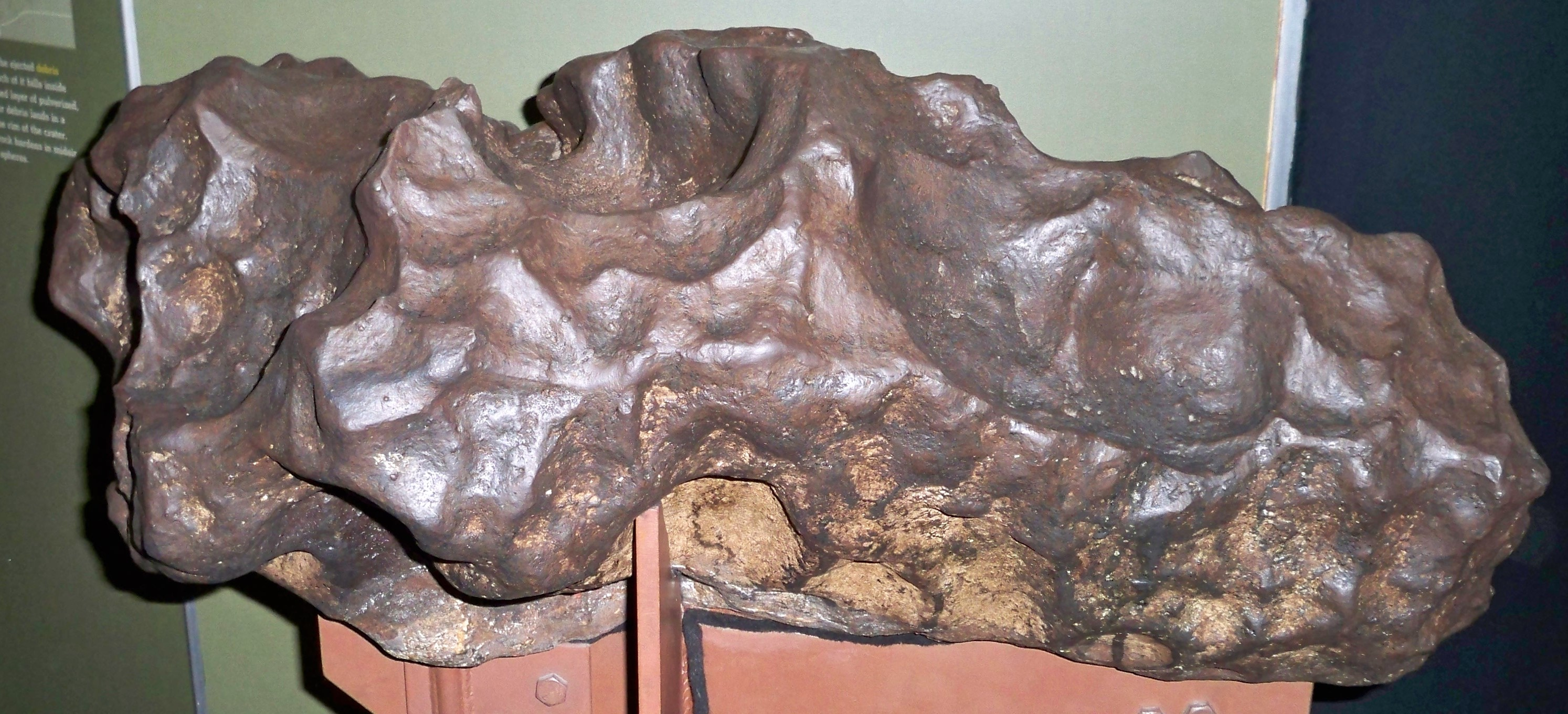
Troilite from the Canyon Diablo meteorite was the first reference standard for δ^{34}S.

Sulfur from meteorites was determined in the early 1950s to be an adequate reference standard because it exhibited a small variability in isotopic ratios. It was also believed that because of their extraterrestrial provenances, meteors represented primordial terrestrial isotopic conditions. During a meeting of the National Science Foundation in April 1962, troilite from the Canyon Diablo meteorite found in Arizona, US, was established as the standard with which δ^{34}S values (and other sulfur stable isotopic ratios) could be calculated. Known as Canyon Diablo Troilite (CDT), the standard was established as having a ^{32}S:^{34}S ratio of 22.220 and was used for around three decades. In 1993, the International Atomic Energy Agency (IAEA) established a new standard, Vienna-CDT (VCDT), based on artificially prepared silver sulfide (IAEA-S-1) that was defined to have a δ^{34}S_{VCDT} value of −0.3‰. In 1994, the original CDT material was found not to be isotopically homogeneous, with internal variations as great as 0.4‰, confirming its unsuitability as a reference standard.

== Causes of variations ==
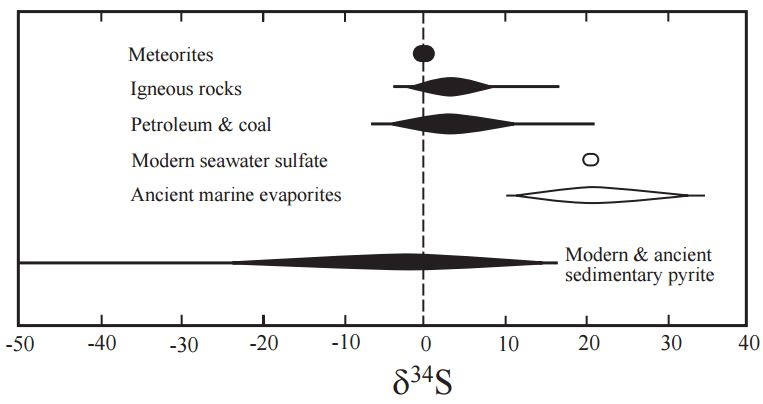
δ^{34}S_{VCDT} values for several geologic reservoirs

Two mechanisms of fractionation occur that alter sulfur stable isotope ratios: kinetic effects, especially due to the metabolism of sulfate-reducing bacteria, and isotope exchange reactions that occur between sulfide phases based on temperature. With VCDT as the reference standard, natural δ^{34}S value variations have been recorded between −72‰ and +147‰.

The presence of sulfate-reducing bacteria, which reduce sulfate (SO^{2−}_{4}) to hydrogen sulfide (H_{2}S), has played a significant role in the oceanic δ^{34}S value throughout the earth's history. Sulfate-reducing bacteria metabolize ^{32}S more readily than ^{34}S, resulting in an increase in the value of the δ^{34}S in the remaining sulfate in the seawater. Archean pyrite found in barite in the Warrawoona Group, Western Australia, with sulfur fractionations as great as 21.1‰ hint at the presence of sulfate-reducers as early as 3,470 million years ago.

It is now better known that the degree of isotope fractionation during microbial sulfate reduction depends on the cell-specific sulfate reduction rate of the sulfate-reducing microorganism. The relative extent of sulfur isotope fractionating activities, including sulfate reduction, sulfide reoxidation and disproportionation, determines the isotopic compositions of the minerals or fluid measured. Other than microbial activities and environmental conditions, isotopic compositions also change due to diffusion, accumulation and mixing after burial.

The δ^{34}S value, recorded by sulfate in marine evaporites, can be used to chart the sulfur cycle throughout earth's history. The Great Oxygenation Event around 2,400 million years ago altered the sulfur cycle radically, as increased atmospheric oxygen permitted an increase in the mechanisms that could fractionate sulfur isotopes, leading to an increase in the δ^{34}S value from ~0‰ pre-oxygenation. Approximately 700 million years ago, the δ^{34}S values in seawater sulfates began to vary more and those in sedimentary sulfates grew more negative. Researchers have interpreted this excursion as indicative of an increase in water column oxygenation with continued periods of anoxia in the deepest waters. Modern seawater sulfate δ^{34}S values are consistently 21.0 ± 0.2‰ across the world's oceans, while sedimentary sulfides vary widely. Seawater sulfate δ^{34}S and δ^{18}O values exhibit similar trends not seen in sedimentary sulfide minerals.

== See also ==
- δ^{13}C
- δ^{15}N
- Isotopic signature
- Isotope analysis
- Isotope geochemistry

== Sources ==
- Hoefs J (2009). Stable Isotope Geochemistry (6th ed.). Berlin: Springer-Verlag. doi:10.1007/978-3-540-70708-0. ISBN 978-3-540-70703-5.
