= Δ15N =

Measure of the ratio of stable isotopes nitrogen-15 and nitrogen-14

In geochemistry, hydrology, palaeoecology, palaeoclimatology, and palaeoceanography, δ^{15}N (pronounced "delta fifteen n") or delta-N-15 is a measure of the ratio of the two stable isotopes of nitrogen, ^{15}N:^{14}N.

== Formulas ==
Two very similar expressions for δ^{15}N are in wide use in hydrology. Both have the form $1000\cdot\frac{s-a}a$ ‰ (‰ = permil or parts per thousand) where s and a are the relative abundances of ^{15}N in respectively the sample and the atmosphere. The difference is whether the relative abundance is with respect to all the nitrogen, i.e. ^{14}N plus ^{15}N, or just to ^{14}N. Since the atmosphere is 99.6337% ^{14}N and 0.3663% ^{15}N, a is 0.003663 in the former case and 0.003663/0.996337 = 0.003676 in the latter. However s varies similarly; for example if in the sample ^{15}N is 0.385% and ^{14}N is 99.615%, s is 0.003850 in the former case and 0.00385/0.99615 = 0.003865 in the latter. The value of $1000\cdot\frac{s-a}a$ is then 51.05‰ in the former case and 51.38‰ in the latter, an insignificant difference in practice given the typical range of −20 to 80 for δ^{15}N.

== Applications ==
The ratio of ^{15}N to ^{14}N is of relevance because in most biological contexts, ^{14}N is preferentially uptaken as the lighter isotope. As a result, samples enriched in ^{15}N can often be introduced through a non-biological context.

One use of ^{15}N is as a tracer to determine the path taken by fertilizers applied to anything from pots to landscapes. Fertilizer enriched in ^{15}N to an extent significantly different from that prevailing in the soil (which may be different from the atmospheric standard a) is applied at a point and other points are then monitored for variations in δ^{15}N.

Another application is the assessment of human waste water discharge into bodies of water. The abundance of ^{15}N is greater in human waste water than in natural water sources. Hence δ^{15}N in benthic sediment gives an indication of the contribution of human waste to the total nitrogen in the sediment. Sediment cores analyzed for δ^{15}N yield an historical record of such waste, with older samples at greater depths.

δ^{15}N is also used to measure food chain length and the trophic level of a given organism; high δ^{15}N values are positively correlated with higher trophic levels; likewise, organisms low on the food chain generally exhibit lower δ^{15}N values. Higher δ^{15}N values in apex predators generally indicate longer food chains. Additionally, in terrestrial ecosystems, a differential in δ^{15}N has been observed between herbivores that consume more grass, with grazers tending to have higher δ^{15}N values than browsers.

== See also ==
- δ^{13}C
- δ^{18}O
- δ^{34}S
- Isotopic signature
- Isotope analysis
- Isotope geochemistry
