= Magnetic isotope effect =

Magnetic isotope effects arise when a chemical reaction involves spin-selective processes, such as the radical pair mechanism. The result is that some isotopes react preferentially, depending on their nuclear spin quantum number I. This is in contrast to more familiar mass-dependent isotope effects.
