= Swain equation =

Equation in chemical kinetics

The Swain equation relates the kinetic isotope effect for the protium/tritium combination with that of the protium/deuterium combination according to:

$$\frac{k_H}{k_T} =  (\frac{k_H}{k_D})^{1.442}$$

where k_{H,D,T} are the reaction rate constants for the protonated, deuterated and tritiated reactants respectively.
