= Kinetic isotope effects of RuBisCO =

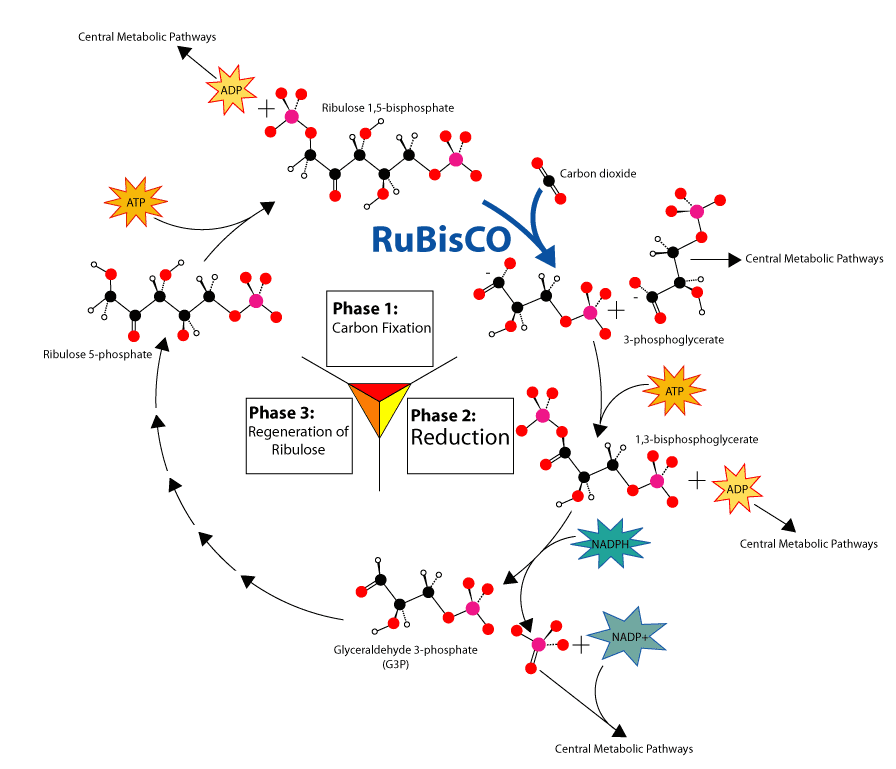
The Calvin-Benson Cycle. The KIE of RuBisCO is associated with the step where RuBisCO catalyzes the fixation of carbon dioxide to Ribulose-1,5-bisphosphate.

The kinetic isotope effect (KIE) of ribulose-1,5-bisphosphate carboxylase oxygenase (RuBisCO) is the isotopic fractionation associated solely with the step in the Calvin-Benson cycle where a molecule of carbon dioxide (CO_{2}) is attached to the 5-carbon sugar ribulose-1,5-bisphosphate (RuBP) to produce two 3-carbon sugars called 3-phosphoglycerate (3 PGA). This chemical reaction is catalyzed by the enzyme RuBisCO, and this enzyme-catalyzed reaction creates the primary kinetic isotope effect of photosynthesis. It is also largely responsible for the isotopic compositions of photosynthetic organisms and the heterotrophs that eat them. Understanding the intrinsic KIE of RuBisCO is of interest to earth scientists, botanists, and ecologists because this isotopic biosignature can be used to reconstruct the evolution of photosynthesis and the rise of oxygen in the geologic record, reconstruct past evolutionary relationships and environmental conditions, and infer plant relationships and productivity in modern environments.

== Reaction details and energetics ==
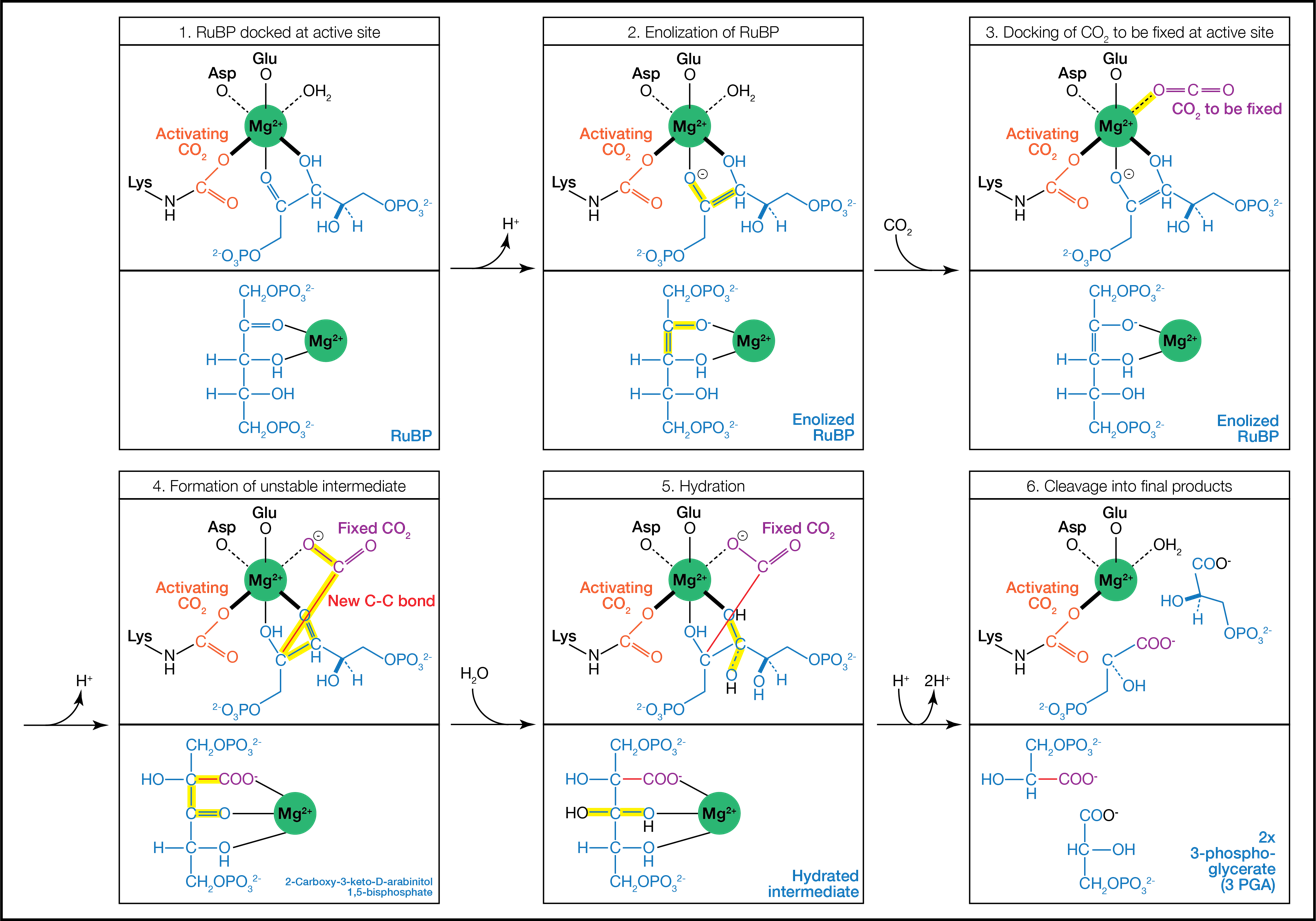
Carboxylation of RuBP catalyzed by RuBisCO. Each step is shown in two panels: 1) The upper panel shows how each molecule is coordinated to the active site, while 2) The lower panel shows specifically how RuBP is being modified. Overall, the carboxylation of RuBP is a multi-step process.

The fixation of CO_{2} by RuBisCO is a multi-step process. First, a CO_{2} molecule (that is not the CO_{2} molecule that is eventually fixed) attaches to the uncharged ε-amino group of lysine 201 in the active site to form a carbamate. This carbamate then binds to the magnesium ion (Mg^{2+}) in RuBisCO's active site. A molecule of RuBP then binds to the Mg^{2+} ion. The bound RuBP then loses a proton to form a reactive, enodiolate species. The rate-limiting step of the Calvin-Benson cycle is the addition of CO_{2} to this 2,3-enediol form of RuBP. This is the stage where the intrinsic KIE of Rubisco occurs because a new C-C bond is formed. The newly formed 2-carboxy-3-keto-D-arabinitol 1,5-bisphosphate molecule is then hydrated and cleaved to form two molecules of 3-phosphoglycerate (3 PGA). 3 PGA is then converted into hexoses to be used in the photosynthetic organism's central metabolism.

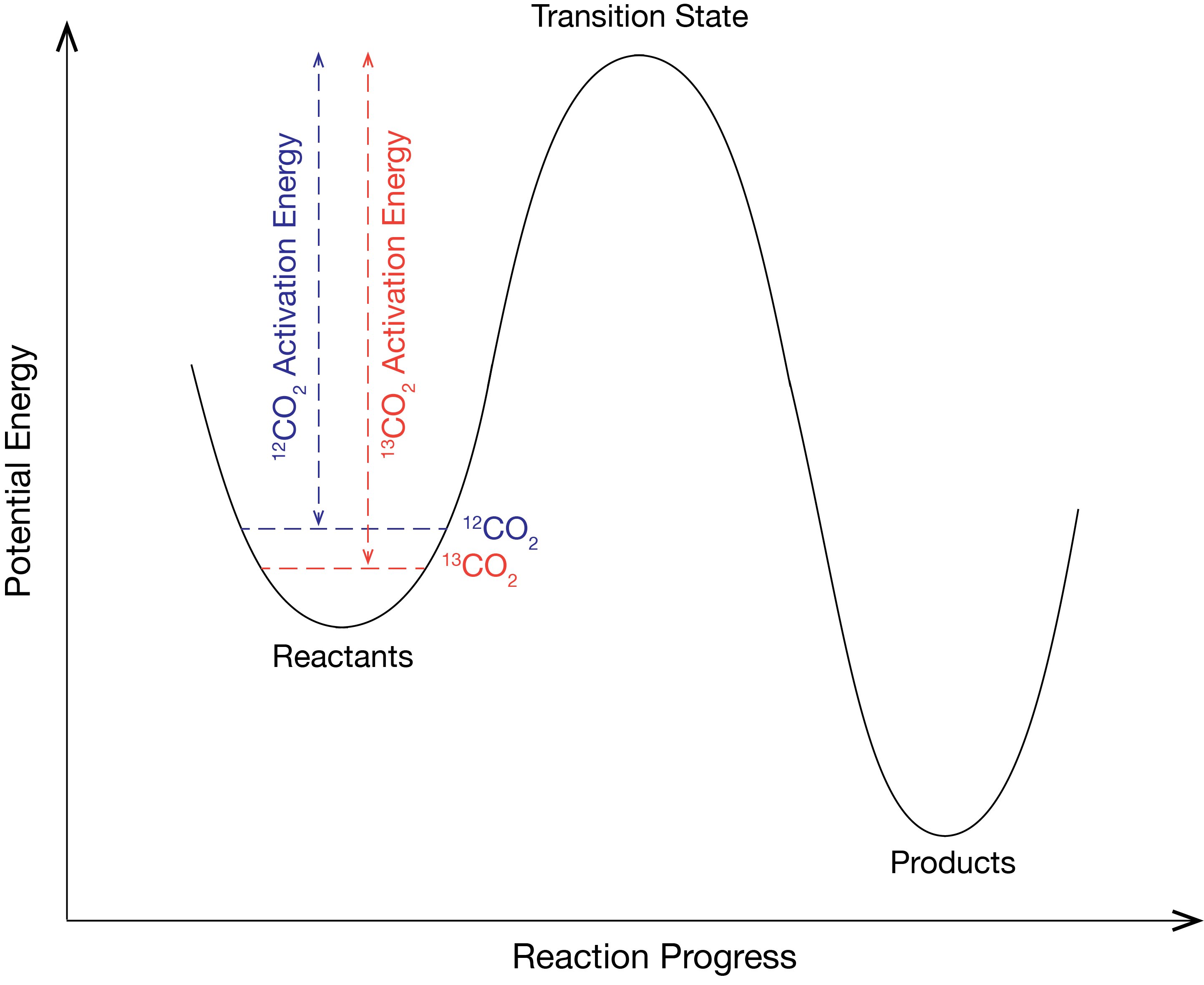
The difference in activation energy required for a heavy or light molecule of carbon dioxide.

The isotopic substitutions that can occur in this reaction are for carbon, oxygen, and/or hydrogen, though currently only a significant isotope effect is seen for carbon isotope substitution. Isotopes are atoms that have the same number of protons but varying numbers of neutrons. "Lighter" isotopes (like the stable carbon-12 isotope) have a smaller overall mass, and "heavier" isotopes (like the stable carbon-13 isotope or radioactive carbon-14 isotope) have a larger overall mass. Stable isotope geochemistry is concerned with how varying chemical and physical processes preferentially enrich or deplete stable isotopes. Enzymes like RuBisCO cause isotopic fractionation because molecules containing lighter isotopes have higher zero-point energies (ZPE), the lowest possible quantum energy state for a given molecular arrangement. For this reaction, ^{13}CO_{2} has a lower ZPE than ^{12}CO_{2} and sits lower in the potential energy well of the reactants. When enzymes catalyze chemical reactions, the lighter isotope is preferentially selected because it has a lower activation energy and is thus more energetically favorable to overcome the high potential-energy transition state and proceed through the reaction. Here, ^{12}CO_{2} has a lower activation energy so more ^{12}CO_{2} than ^{13}CO_{2} goes through the reaction, resulting in the product (3 PGA) being lighter.

== Ecological trade-offs influence isotope effects ==
The observed intrinsic KIEs of RuBisCO have been correlated with two aspects of its enzyme kinetics: 1) Its "specificity" for CO_{2} over O_{2}, and 2) Its rate of carboxylation.

=== Specificity (S_{C/O}) ===
The reactive enodiolate species is also sensitive to oxygen (O_{2}), which results in the dual carboxylase / oxygenase activity of RuBisCO. This reaction is considered wasteful as it produces products (3-phosphoglycerate and 2-phosphoglycolate) that must be catabolized through photorespiration. This process requires energy and is a missed-opportunity for CO_{2} fixation, which results in the net loss of carbon fixation efficiency for the organism. The dual carboxylase / oxygenase activity of RuBisCO is exacerbated by the fact that O_{2} and CO_{2} are small, relatively indistinguishable molecules that can bind only weakly, if at all, in Michaelis-Menten complexes. There are four forms of RuBisCO (Form I, II, III, and IV), with Form I being the most abundantly used form. Form I is used extensively by higher plants, eukaryotic algae, cyanobacteria, and Pseudomonadota (formerly proteobacteria). Form II is also used but much less widespread, and can be found in some species of Pseudomonadota and in dinoflagellates. RuBisCOs from different photosynthetic organisms display varying abilities to distinguish between CO_{2} and O_{2}. This property can be quantified and is termed "specificity" (S_{c/o}). A higher value of S_{c/o} means that a RuBisCO's carboxylase activity is greater than its oxygenase activity.

=== Rate of carboxylation (V_{C}) and Michaelis-Menten constant (K_{C}) ===
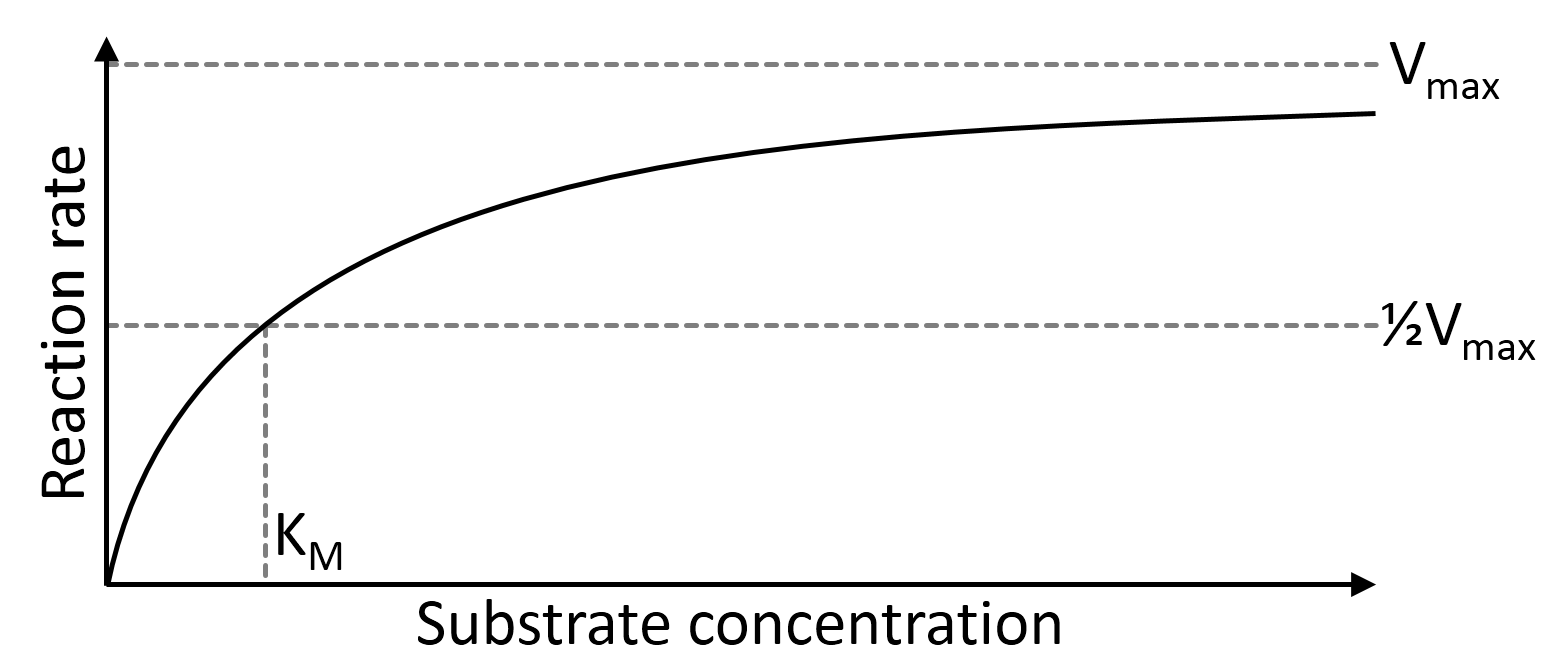
A generalized Michaelis-Menten curve.

The rate of carboxylation (V_{C}) is the rate that RuBisCO fixes CO_{2} to RuBP under substrate saturated conditions. A higher value of V_{C} corresponds to a higher rate of carboxylation. This rate of carboxylation can also be represented through its Michaelis-Menten constant K_{C}, with a higher value of K_{C} corresponding to a higher rate of carboxylation. V_{C} is represented by V_{max}, and K_{C} is represented as K_{M} in the generalized Michaelis-Menten curve. Although the rate of carboxylation varies among RuBisCO types, RuBisCO on average fixes only three molecules of CO_{2} per second. This is remarkably slow compared to typical enzyme catalytic rates, which usually catalyze reactions at the rate of thousands of molecules per second.

=== Phylogenetic patterns ===
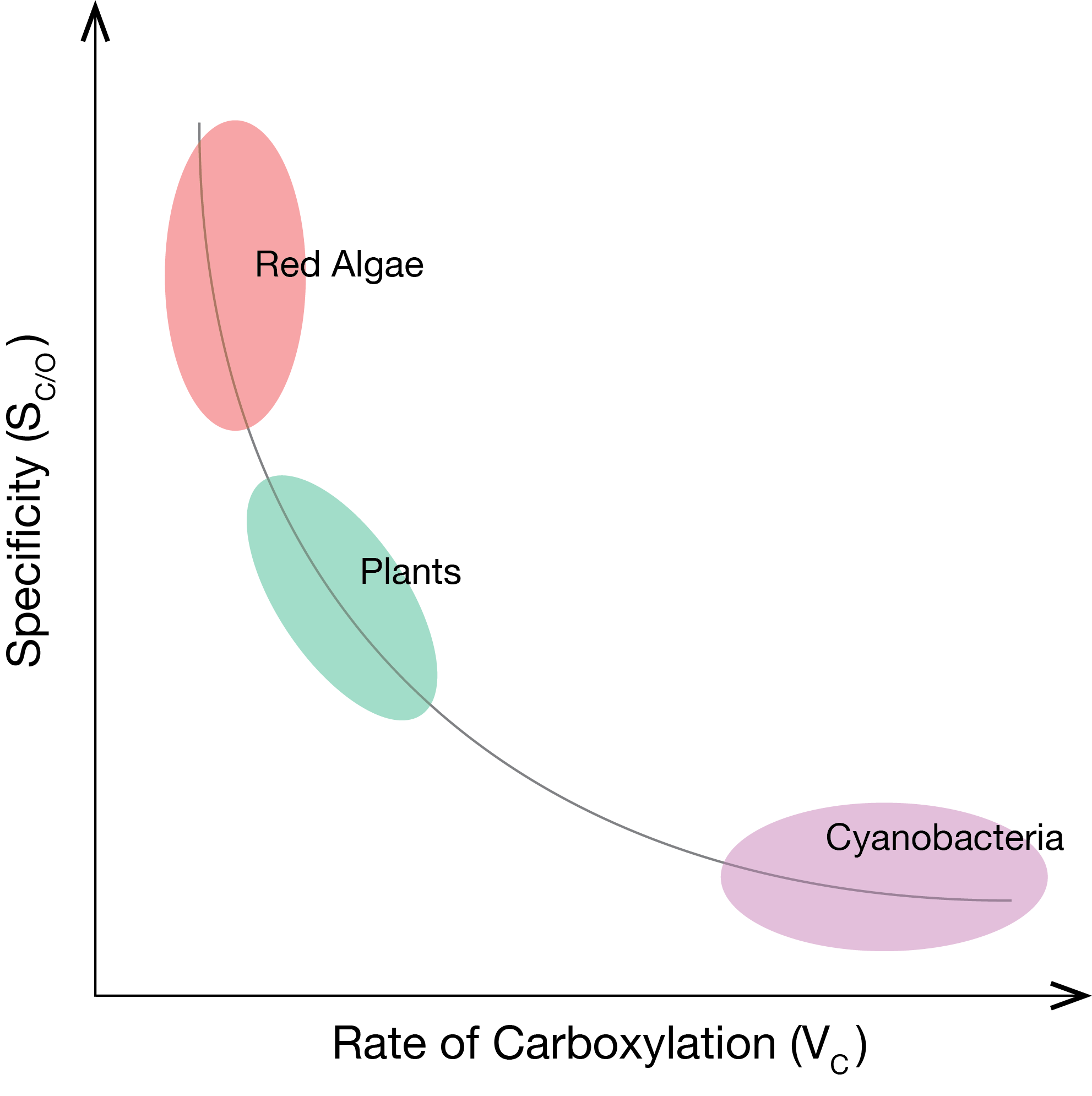
Relationship between specificity and carboxylation rate of varying photosynthetic organisms.

It has been observed among natural RuBisCOs that an increased ability to distinguish between CO_{2} and O_{2} (larger values of S_{c/o}) corresponds with a decreased rate of carboxylation (lower values of V_{C} and K_{C}). The variation and trade-off between S_{c/o} and K_{C} has been observed across all photosynthetic organisms, from photosynthetic bacteria and algae to higher plants. Organisms using RuBisCOs with high values of V_{C} / K_{C}, and low values of S_{c/o} have localized RuBisCO to areas within the cell with artificially high local CO_{2} concentrations. In cyanobacteria, concentrations of CO_{2} are increased using a carboxysome, an icosahedral protein compartment about 100 nm in diameter that selectively uptakes bicarbonate and converts it to CO_{2} in the presence of RuBisCO. Organisms without a CCM, like certain plants, instead utilize RuBisCOs with high values of S_{c/o} and low values of V_{C} and K_{C}. It has been theorized that groups with a CCM have been able to maximize K_{C} at the expense of decreasing S_{c/o}, because artificially enhancing the concentration of CO_{2} would decrease the concentration of O_{2} and remove the need for high CO_{2} specificity. However, the opposite is true for organisms without a CCM, who must optimize S_{c/o} at the expense of K_{C} because O_{2} is readily present in the atmosphere.

This trade-off between S_{c/o} and V_{C} or K_{C} observed in extant organisms suggest that RuBisCO has evolved through geologic time to be maximally optimized in its current, modern environment. RuBisCO evolved over 2.5 billion years ago when atmospheric CO_{2} concentrations were 300 to 600 times higher than present day concentrations, and oxygen concentrations were only 5-18% of present-day levels. Therefore, because CO_{2} was abundant and O_{2} rare, there was no need for the ancestral RuBisCO enzyme to have high specificity. This is supported by the biochemical characterization of an ancestral RuBisCO enzyme, which has intermediate values of V_{C} and S_{C/O} between the extreme end-members.

It has been theorized that this ecological trade-off is due to the form that 2-carboxy-3-keto-D-arabinitol 1,5-bisphophate in its transient transition state before cleaving into two 3PGA molecules. The more closely the Mg^{2+}-bound CO_{2} moiety resembles the carboxylate group in 2-carboxy-3-keto-D-arabinitol 1,5-bisphophate, the greater the structural difference between the transition states of carboxylation and oxygenation. The larger structural difference allows RuBisCO to better distinguish between CO_{2} and O_{2}, resulting in larger values of S_{c/o}. However, this increasing structural similarity between the transition state and the product state requires strong binding at the carboxyketone group, and this binding is so strong that the rate of cleavage into two product 3PGA molecules is slowed. Therefore, an increased specificity for CO_{2} over O_{2} necessitates a lower overall rate of carboxylation. This theory implies that there is a physical chemistry limitation at the heart of Rubisco's active site, and may preclude any efforts to engineer a simultaneously more selective and faster Rubisco.

=== Isotope effects ===
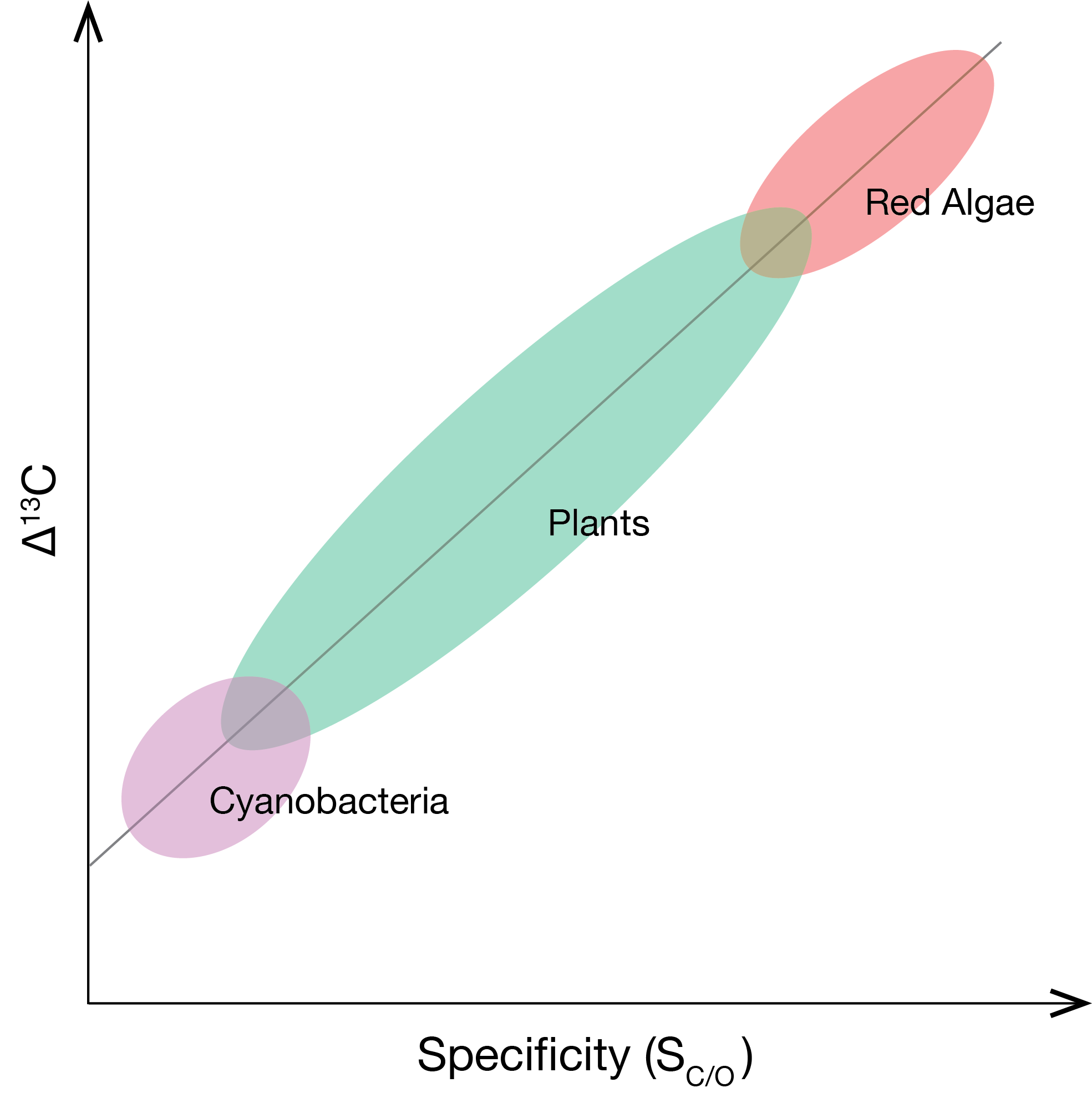
Specificity of RuBisCO for CO_{2} vs O_{2} determines the extent of Carbon isotope fractionation.

S_{c/o} has been positively correlated with the magnitude of carbon isotope fractionation (represented by Δ^{13}C), with larger values of S_{c/o} corresponding with a larger values of Δ^{13}C. It has been theorized that because increasing S_{c/o} means the transition state is more like the product, the O_{2}C---C-2 bond will be shorter, resulting in a higher overall potential energy & vibrational energy. This creates a higher energy transition state, which makes it even harder for ^{13}CO_{2} (lower in the potential energy well than ^{12}CO_{2}) to overcome the required activation energy. The RuBisCOs used by varying photosynthetic organisms vary slightly in their enzyme structure, and this enzyme structure results in varying transition states. This diversity in enzyme structure is reflected in the resulting Δ^{13}C values measured from different photosynthetic organisms. However, overlap exists between the Δ^{13}C values of different groups because the carbon isotope values measured are generally of the entire organism, and not just its RuBisCO enzyme. Many other factors, including growth rate and the isotopic composition of the starting substrate, can affect the carbon isotope values of whole organism and cause the spread seen in C isotope measurements.

== See also ==
- Isotope geochemistry
- Fractionation of carbon isotopes in oxygenic photosynthesis
- Isotopes of carbon
- Isotopic signature
