= Nucleosynthesis =

Process of creating new atomic nuclei from existing nucleons

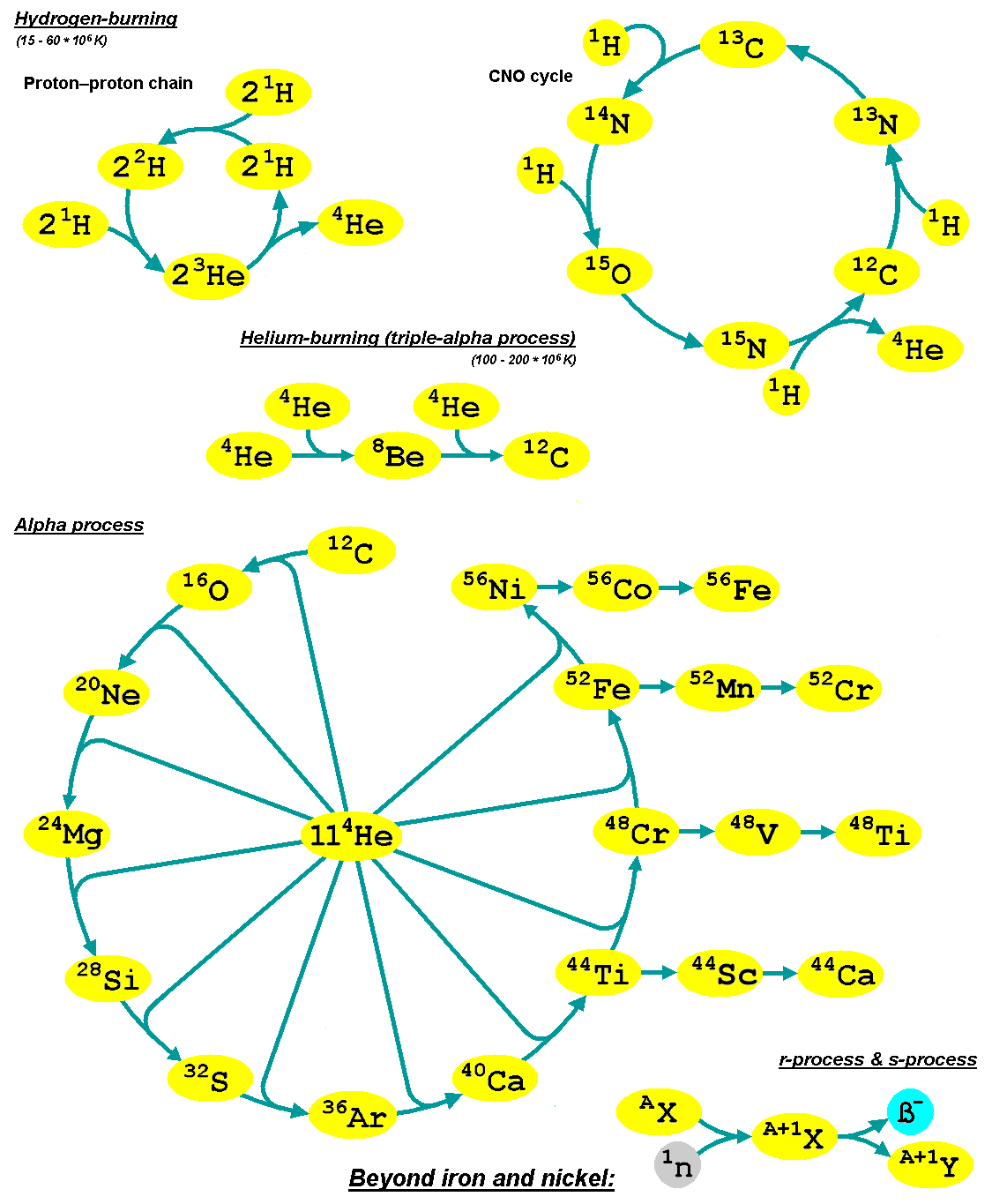
Diagram illustrating the creation of new elements by the alpha process

Nucleosynthesis is the process that creates new atomic nuclei from pre-existing nucleons (protons and neutrons) and nuclei. According to current theories, the first nuclei were formed a few minutes after the Big Bang through nuclear reactions in a process called Big Bang nucleosynthesis. After about 20 minutes, the universe had expanded and cooled to a point at which these high-energy collisions among nucleons ended, so only the fastest and simplest reactions occurred, leaving our universe containing hydrogen and helium, traces of other elements, such as lithium, and the hydrogen isotope deuterium. Nucleosynthesis in stars and stellar events such as novas and supernovas later produced the variety of elements and isotopes that we have today, in a process called cosmic chemical evolution. The amounts of total mass in elements heavier than hydrogen and helium (called "metals" by astrophysicists) remain small (a few percent), so that the universe still has approximately the same composition.

Stars fuse light elements to heavier ones in their cores, giving off energy in the process known as stellar nucleosynthesis. Nuclear fusion reactions create many of the lighter elements, up to and including iron and nickel in the most massive stars. Products of stellar nucleosynthesis remain trapped in stellar cores and remnants except if ejected through stellar winds and explosions. The neutron capture reactions of the r-process and s-process create heavier elements, from iron upwards.

Supernova nucleosynthesis within exploding stars is largely responsible for the elements between oxygen and rubidium: from the ejection of elements produced during stellar nucleosynthesis; through explosive nucleosynthesis during the supernova explosion; and from the r-process (absorption of multiple neutrons) during the explosion.

Neutron star mergers are a recently-identified major source of elements produced in the r-process. When two neutron stars collide, a significant amount of neutron-rich matter may be ejected which then quickly forms heavy elements.

Cosmic ray spallation is a process wherein cosmic rays impact nuclei and fragment them. It is a significant source of the lighter nuclei, particularly ^{3}He, ^{9}Be and ^{10,11}B, that are not created by stellar nucleosynthesis. Cosmic ray spallation can occur in the interstellar medium, on asteroids and meteoroids, or on Earth in the atmosphere or in the ground. This contributes to the presence on Earth of cosmogenic nuclides.

On Earth new nuclei are also produced by radiogenesis, the decay of long-lived, primordial radionuclides such as uranium, thorium, and potassium-40.

== History ==
Periodic table showing the currently believed origins of each element. Elements from carbon up to sulfur may be made in stars of all masses by charged-particle fusion reactions. Iron group elements originate mostly from the nuclear-statistical equilibrium process in thermonuclear supernova explosions. Elements beyond iron are made in high-mass stars with slow neutron capture (s-process), and by rapid neutron capture in the r-process, with origins being debated among rare supernova variants and compact-star collisions. Note that this graphic is a first-order simplification of an active research field with many open questions.

=== Timeline ===
The first protons and neutrons were formed from the quark-gluon plasma around 13.8 billion years ago during the Big Bang, as the universe cooled below about ten billion Kelvin, or one MeV. As the universe continued to cool over the next few minutes, these protons and neutrons could combine to form hydrogen (deuterium) and helium nuclei. Trace amounts of lithium were also formed, but given the high amount of radiation in proportion to matter at this time, the high binding energies of heavier elements meant they were not produced. Free electrons were combined with these existing nuclei around 380,000 years after the Big Bang, when matter and radiation were decoupled, producing the Cosmic Microwave Background. This first process, Big Bang nucleosynthesis (BBN), was the first type of nucleogenesis to occur in the universe. The vast majority of matter in the universe even today (about 74%) is hydrogen produced by BBN, while another 24% is helium. The first stars (called Population III stars) to form in the universe were therefore formed almost entirely of hydrogen and helium, with trace amounts of lithium, beryllium, and boron. (Some Li, Be, and B currently found in the universe was formed through BBN, but most was made either through cosmic ray spallation or through stellar fusion.)

The subsequent nucleosynthesis of heavier elements (called "metals" by astronomers) requires the extreme temperatures and pressures found within stars and supernovae. These processes began as hydrogen and helium created by BBN collapsed into the first stars, called Population III stars, a few hundred million years after the Big Bang. Star formation has been occurring continuously in galaxies since that time, often called "Cosmic Dawn". Heavier elements in today's universe are synthesized through stellar nucleosynthesis (e.g. carbon and nitrogen), supernova nucleosynthesis (e.g. magnesium, aluminum), or in exotic events such as neutron star collisions (e.g. europium). Some elements are synthesized through multiple of these processes. Other nuclides, such as ^{40}Ar, formed through radioactive decay.

Because the processes by which different elements form happen at different points in a given galaxy's life, astronomers can sometimes use the abundances of these elements to date the formation of a star or structure within a galaxy. For example, most magnesium found in the interstellar medium (ISM) was ejected into it by core-collapse supernovae, whereas much of the universe's iron was formed in type Ia supernovae. Type Ia supernovae occur when one star in a binary dies, leaving a white dwarf remnant. Material from the white dwarf's normal binary companion accretes onto it, and its temperature and density increase to the point of ignition, causing it to violently explode. Typically, we see the effects of type Ia supernovae on the composition of the ISM around 1 billion years after the start of star formation in that galaxy. Meanwhile, core-collapse supernovae are the deaths of massive stars, which typically live only a few million years. This means that as a general rule, the ratio of magnesium to iron abundance in stars that form earlier than 1 billion years after the start of star formation in a region will be higher than the same ratio in stars that form later, since magnesium began to be incorporated into the ISM earlier than iron.

=== History of nucleosynthesis theory ===
The first ideas on nucleosynthesis were simply that the chemical elements were created at the beginning of the universe, but no rational physical scenario for this could be identified. Gradually it became clear that hydrogen and helium are much more abundant than any of the other elements. All the rest constitute less than 2% of the mass of the Solar System, and of other star systems as well. At the same time it was clear that oxygen and carbon were the next two most common elements, and also that there was a general trend toward high abundance of the light elements, especially those with isotopes composed of whole numbers of helium-4 nuclei (alpha nuclides).

Arthur Stanley Eddington first suggested in 1920 that stars obtain their energy by fusing hydrogen into helium and raised the possibility that the heavier elements may also form in stars. This idea was not generally accepted, as the nuclear mechanism was not understood. In the years immediately before World War II, Hans Bethe first elucidated those nuclear mechanisms by which hydrogen is fused into helium.

Fred Hoyle's original work on nucleosynthesis of heavier elements in stars, occurred just after World War II. His work explained the production of all heavier elements, starting from hydrogen. Hoyle proposed that hydrogen is continuously created in the universe from vacuum and energy, without need for universal beginning.

Hoyle's work explained how the abundances of the elements increased with time as the galaxy aged. Subsequently, Hoyle's picture was expanded during the 1960s by contributions from William A. Fowler, Alastair G. W. Cameron, and Donald D. Clayton, followed by many others. The seminal 1957 "B2FH" review paper by E. M. Burbidge, G. R. Burbidge, Fowler and Hoyle is a well-known summary of the state of the field in 1957. That paper defined new processes for the transformation of one heavy nucleus into others within stars, processes that could be documented by astronomers.

The Big Bang itself had been proposed in 1931, long before this period, by Georges Lemaître, a Belgian physicist, who suggested that the evident expansion of the Universe in time required that the Universe, if contracted backwards in time, would continue to do so until it could contract no further. This would bring all the mass of the Universe to a single point, a "primeval atom", to a state before which time and space did not exist. Hoyle is credited with coining the term "Big Bang" during a 1949 BBC radio broadcast, saying that Lemaître's theory was "based on the hypothesis that all the matter in the universe was created in one big bang at a particular time in the remote past". It is popularly reported that Hoyle intended this to be pejorative, but Hoyle explicitly denied this and said it was just a striking image meant to highlight the difference between the two models. Lemaître's model was needed to explain the existence of deuterium and nuclides between helium and carbon, as well as the fundamentally high amount of helium present, not only in stars but also in interstellar space. As it happened, both Lemaître and Hoyle's models of nucleosynthesis would be needed to explain the elemental abundances in the universe.

The goal of the theory of nucleosynthesis is to explain the vastly differing abundances of the chemical elements and their several isotopes from the perspective of natural processes. The primary stimulus to the development of this theory was the shape of a plot of the abundances versus the atomic number of the elements. Those abundances, when plotted on a graph as a function of atomic number, have a jagged sawtooth structure that varies by factors up to ten million. A very influential stimulus to nucleosynthesis research was an abundance table created by Hans Suess and Harold Urey that was based on the unfractionated abundances of the non-volatile elements found within unevolved meteorites. Such a graph of the abundances is displayed on a logarithmic scale, where the dramatically jagged structure is visually suppressed by the many powers of ten spanned in the vertical scale of this graph.

Abundances of the chemical elements in the Solar System. Hydrogen and helium are most common, residuals within the paradigm of the Big Bang. The next three elements (Li, Be, B) are rare because they are poorly-synthesized in the Big Bang and also in stars. The two general trends in the remaining stellar-produced elements are: (1) an alternation of abundance of elements according to whether they have even or odd atomic numbers, and (2) a general decrease in abundance, as elements become heavier. Within this trend is a peak at abundances of iron and nickel, which is especially visible on a logarithmic graph spanning fewer powers of ten, say between logA = 2 (A = 100) and logA = 6 (A = 1,000,000).

== Processes ==
There are several astrophysical processes which are believed to be responsible for nucleosynthesis. The majority of these occur within stars, and the chain of those nuclear fusion processes are known as hydrogen burning (via the proton–proton chain or the CNO cycle), helium burning, carbon burning, neon burning, oxygen burning and silicon burning. These processes are capable of creating elements up to and including iron and nickel. This is the region of nucleosynthesis within which the isotopes with the highest binding energy per nucleon are created.

Heavier elements can be assembled within stars mainly by the slow neutron capture process known as the s-process or in explosive environments, such as supernovae and neutron star mergers, by the r-process, which involves rapid neutron captures (faster than the half-lifes of the intermediate isotopes). There is also a minor contribution from processes involving proton capture, such as the rp-process, and the p-process. These processes allow the synthesis of some proton-rich isotopes that cannot be created by neutron capture and subsequent beta-decays.

== Major types ==
=== Big Bang nucleosynthesis ===
Big Bang nucleosynthesis occurred within the first three minutes of the beginning of the universe and is responsible for much of the abundance of ^{1}H (protium), ^{2}H (D, deuterium), ^{3}He (helium-3), and ^{4}He (helium-4). Although ^{4}He continues to be produced by stellar fusion and alpha decays and trace amounts of ^{1}H continue to be produced by spallation and certain types of radioactive decay, most of the mass of the isotopes in the universe are thought to have been produced in the Big Bang. The nuclei of these elements, along with some ^{7}Li and ^{7}Be are considered to have been formed between 100 and 300 seconds after the Big Bang when the primordial quark–gluon plasma froze out to form protons and neutrons. Because of the very short period in which nucleosynthesis occurred before it was stopped by expansion and cooling (about 20 minutes), no elements heavier than beryllium (or possibly boron) could be formed. Elements formed during this time were in the plasma state, and did not cool to the state of neutral atoms until much later.

$\begin{array}{ll} \ce{n^0 -> p+{} + e^-{} + \overline{\nu}_e} & \ce{p+{} + n^0 -> ^2_1D{} + \gamma}\\ \ce{^2_1D{} + p+ -> ^3_2He{} + \gamma} & \ce{^2_1D{} + ^2_1D -> ^3_2He{} + n^0}\\ \ce{^2_1D{} + ^2_1D -> ^3_1T{} + p+} & \ce{^3_1T{} + ^2_1D -> ^4_2He{} + n^0}\\ \ce{^3_1T{} + ^4_2He -> ^7_3Li{} + \gamma} & \ce{^3_2He{} + n^0 -> ^3_1T{} + p+}\\ \ce{^3_2He{} + ^2_1D -> ^4_2He{} + p+} & \ce{^3_2He{} + ^4_2He -> ^7_4Be{} + \gamma}\\ \ce{^7_3Li{} + p+ -> ^4_2He{} + ^4_2He} & \ce{^7_4Be{} + n^0 -> ^7_3Li{} + p+} \end{array}$
Chief nuclear reactions responsible for the relative abundances of light atomic nuclei observed throughout the universe

=== Stellar nucleosynthesis ===
Stellar nucleosynthesis is the nuclear process by which new nuclei are produced. It occurs in stars during stellar evolution. It is responsible for the galactic abundances of elements from carbon to iron. Stars are thermonuclear furnaces in which hydrogen and helium are fused into heavier nuclei by increasingly high temperatures as the composition of the core evolves. Of particular importance is carbon because its formation from He is a bottleneck in the entire process. Carbon is produced by the triple-alpha process in all stars. Carbon is also the main element that causes the release of free neutrons within stars, giving rise to the s-process, in which the slow absorption of neutrons converts iron into elements heavier than iron and nickel.

The products of stellar nucleosynthesis are generally dispersed into the interstellar gas through mass loss episodes and the stellar winds of low-mass stars. The mass loss events can be witnessed today in the planetary nebula phase of low-mass star evolution, and the explosive ending of stars, called supernovae, of those with more than eight times the mass of the Sun.

The first direct proof that nucleosynthesis occurs in stars was the astronomical observation that interstellar gas has become enriched with heavy elements as time passed. As a result, stars that were born from it late in the galaxy, formed with much higher initial heavy element abundances than those that had formed earlier. The detection of technetium in the atmosphere of a red giant star in 1952, by spectroscopy, provided the first evidence of nuclear activity within stars. Because technetium is radioactive, with a half-life much less than the age of the star, its abundance must reflect its recent creation within that star. Equally convincing evidence of the stellar origin of heavy elements is the large overabundances of specific stable elements found in stellar atmospheres of asymptotic giant branch stars. Observation of barium abundances some 20–50 times greater than found in unevolved stars is evidence of the operation of the s-process within such stars. Many modern proofs of stellar nucleosynthesis are provided by the isotopic compositions of stardust, solid grains that have condensed from the gases of individual stars and which have been extracted from meteorites. Stardust is one component of cosmic dust and is frequently called presolar grains. The measured isotopic compositions in stardust grains demonstrate many aspects of nucleosynthesis within the stars from which the grains condensed during the star's late-life mass-loss episodes.

=== Explosive nucleosynthesis ===
Supernova nucleosynthesis occurs in the energetic environment in supernovae, in which the elements between silicon and nickel are synthesized in quasiequilibrium established during fast fusion that attaches by reciprocating balanced nuclear reactions to ^{28}Si. Quasiequilibrium can be thought of as almost equilibrium except for a high abundance of the ^{28}Si nuclei in the feverishly burning mix. This concept was the most important discovery in nucleosynthesis theory of the intermediate-mass elements since Hoyle's 1954 paper because it provided an overarching understanding of the abundant and chemically important elements between silicon ( A = 28 ) and nickel ( A = 60 ). It replaced the incorrect although much-cited alpha process of the B^{2}FH paper, which inadvertently obscured Hoyle's 1954 theory. Further nucleosynthesis processes can occur, in particular the r-process (rapid process) described by the B^{2}FH paper and first calculated by Seeger, Fowler and Clayton, in which the most neutron-rich isotopes of elements heavier than nickel are produced by rapid absorption of free neutrons. The creation of free neutrons by electron capture during the rapid compression of the supernova core along with the assembly of some neutron-rich seed nuclei makes the r-process a primary process, and one that can occur even in a star of pure H and He. This is in contrast to the B^{2}FH designation of the process as a secondary process. This promising scenario, though generally supported by supernova experts, has yet to achieve a satisfactory calculation of r-process abundances. The primary r-process has been confirmed by astronomers who had observed old stars born when galactic metallicity was still small, that nonetheless contain their complement of r-process nuclei; thereby demonstrating that the metallicity is a product of an internal process. The r-process is responsible for our natural cohort of radioactive elements, such as uranium and thorium, as well as the most neutron-rich isotopes of each heavy element.

The rp-process (rapid proton) involves the rapid absorption of free protons as well as neutrons, but its role and its existence are less certain.

Explosive nucleosynthesis occurs too rapidly for radioactive decay to decrease the number of neutrons, so that many abundant isotopes with equal and even numbers of protons and neutrons are synthesized by the silicon quasi-equilibrium process. During this process, the burning of oxygen and silicon fuses nuclei that themselves have equal numbers of protons and neutrons to produce nuclides which consist of whole numbers of helium nuclei, up to 15 (representing ^{60}Ni). Such multiple-alpha-particle nuclides are totally stable up to ^{40}Ca (made of 10 helium nuclei), but heavier nuclei with equal and even numbers of protons and neutrons are tightly-bound but unstable. The quasi-equilibrium produces radioactive isobars ^{44}Ti, ^{48}Cr, ^{52}Fe, and ^{56}Ni, which (except ^{44}Ti) are created in abundance but decay after the explosion and leave the most stable isotope of the corresponding element at the same atomic weight. The most abundant and extant isotopes of elements produced in this way are ^{48}Ti, ^{52}Cr, and ^{56}Fe. These decays are accompanied by the emission of gamma rays (radiation from the nucleus), whose spectroscopic lines can be used to identify the isotope created by the decay. The detection of these emission lines was an important early product of gamma-ray astronomy.

The most convincing proof of explosive nucleosynthesis in supernovae occurred in 1987 when those gamma-ray lines were detected emerging from supernova 1987A. Gamma-ray lines identifying ^{56}Co and ^{57}Co nuclei, whose half-lives limit their age to about a year, proved that their radioactive cobalt parents created them. This nuclear astronomy observation was predicted in 1969 as a way to confirm explosive nucleosynthesis of the elements, and that prediction played an important role in the planning for NASA's Compton Gamma Ray Observatory.

Other proofs of explosive nucleosynthesis are found within the stardust grains that condensed within the interiors of supernovae as they expanded and cooled. Stardust grains are one component of cosmic dust. In particular, radioactive ^{44}Ti was measured to be very abundant within supernova stardust grains at the time they condensed during the supernova expansion. This confirmed a 1975 prediction of the identification of supernova stardust ("SUNOCONs"), which became part of the pantheon of presolar grains. Other unusual isotopic ratios within these grains reveal many specific aspects of explosive nucleosynthesis.

Another type of explosive nucleosynthesis through the r-process was suggested in the flaring of magnetars. Some direct evidence for this was published in 2025. It is estimated that this kind of event has created ~1%–10% of the heavier elements in the universe.

=== Neutron star mergers ===
As of the mid-2020s, the merger of binary neutron stars (BNSs) is believed to be the main source of r-process elements. Being neutron-rich by definition, mergers of this type had been suspected of being a source of such elements, but definitive evidence was difficult to obtain. In 2017 strong evidence emerged, when LIGO, Virgo, the Fermi Gamma-ray Space Telescope and INTEGRAL, along with a collaboration of many observatories around the world, detected both gravitational wave and electromagnetic signatures of a likely neutron star merger, GW170817, and subsequently detected signals of numerous heavy elements such as gold as the ejected degenerate matter decayed and cooled. The first detection of the merger of a neutron star and black hole (NSBHs) came in July 2021 and more after but analysis seem to favor BNSs over NSBHs as the main contributors to heavy metal production.

=== Black hole accretion disk nucleosynthesis ===
Nucleosynthesis may happen in accretion disks of black holes.

=== Cosmic ray spallation ===
Cosmic ray spallation process reduces the atomic weight of interstellar matter by the impact with cosmic rays, to produce some of the lightest elements present in the universe (though not a significant amount of deuterium). Most notably spallation is believed to be responsible for the generation of almost all of ^{3}He and the elements lithium, beryllium, and boron, although some ^{7}Li and ^{7}Be are thought to have been produced in the Big Bang. The spallation process results from the impact of cosmic rays (mostly fast protons) against the interstellar medium. These impacts fragment carbon, nitrogen, and oxygen nuclei present. The process results in the light elements beryllium, boron, and lithium in the cosmos at much greater abundances than they are found within stellar atmospheres. The quantities of the light elements ^{1}H and ^{4}He produced by spallation are negligible relative to their primordial abundance.

Beryllium and boron are not significantly produced by stellar fusion processes, since ^{8}Be has an extremely short half-life of 8.2×10^{−17} seconds.

== Empirical evidence ==
Theories of nucleosynthesis are tested by calculating isotope abundances and comparing those results with observed abundances. Isotope abundances are typically calculated from the transition rates between isotopes in a network. Often these calculations can be simplified as a few key reactions control the rate of other reactions.

== Minor mechanisms and processes ==
Tiny amounts of certain nuclides are produced on Earth by artificial means. Those are our primary source, for example, of technetium. However, some nuclides are also produced by a number of natural means that have continued after primordial elements were in place. These often act to create new elements in ways that can be used to date rocks or to trace the source of geological processes. Although these processes do not produce the nuclides in abundance, they are assumed to be the entire source of the existing natural supply of those nuclides.

These mechanisms include:

- Radioactive decay may lead to radiogenic daughter nuclides. The nuclear decay of many long-lived primordial isotopes, especially uranium-235, uranium-238, and thorium-232 produces many intermediate daughter nuclides before they too finally decay to isotopes of lead. The Earth's natural supply of elements like radon and polonium is via this mechanism. The atmosphere's supply of argon-40 is due mostly to the radioactive decay of potassium-40 in the time since the formation of the Earth. Little of the atmospheric argon is primordial. Helium-4 is produced by alpha decay, and the helium trapped in Earth's crust is also mostly non-primordial. In other types of radioactive decay, such as cluster decay, larger species of nuclei are ejected (for example, neon-20), and these eventually become newly-formed stable atoms.
- Radioactive decay may lead to spontaneous fission. This is not cluster decay, as the fission products may be split among nearly any type of atom. Thorium-232, uranium-235, and uranium-238 are primordial isotopes that undergo spontaneous fission. Natural technetium and promethium are produced in this manner.
- Nuclear reactions: Naturally-occurring nuclear reactions powered by radioactive decay give rise to so-called nucleogenic nuclides. This process happens when an energetic particle from radioactive decay, often an alpha particle, reacts with a nucleus of another atom to change the nucleus into another nuclide. This process may also cause the production of further subatomic particles, such as neutrons. Neutrons can also be produced in spontaneous fission and by neutron emission. These neutrons can then go on to produce other nuclides via neutron-induced fission, or by neutron capture. For example, some stable isotopes such as neon-21 and neon-22 are produced by several routes of nucleogenic synthesis, and thus only part of their abundance is primordial.
- Nuclear reactions due to cosmic rays: By convention, these reaction products are not termed "nucleogenic" nuclides, but rather cosmogenic nuclides. Cosmic rays continue to produce new elements on Earth by the same cosmogenic processes discussed above that produce primordial beryllium and boron. One important example is carbon-14, produced from nitrogen-14 in the atmosphere by cosmic rays. Iodine-129 is another example.

== See also ==
- Extinct isotopes of superheavy elements
