= Supernova nucleosynthesis =

Production of the elements in a supernova explosion

Supernova nucleosynthesis is the nucleosynthesis of chemical elements in supernova explosions.

In sufficiently massive stars, the nucleosynthesis by fusion of lighter elements into heavier ones occurs during sequential hydrostatic burning processes called helium burning, carbon burning, neon burning, oxygen burning, and silicon burning, in which the byproducts of one nuclear fuel become, after compressional heating, the fuel for the subsequent burning stage. In this context, the word "burning" refers to nuclear fusion and not a chemical reaction.

During hydrostatic burning these fuels synthesize overwhelmingly the alpha nuclides (A = 2Z), nuclei composed of integer numbers of helium-4 nuclei. Initially, two helium-4 nuclei fuse into a single beryllium-8 nucleus. The addition of another helium-4 nucleus to the beryllium yields carbon-12, followed by oxygen-16, neon-20 and so on, each time adding 2 protons and 2 neutrons to the growing nucleus. A rapid final explosive burning is caused by the sudden temperature spike owing to passage of the radially moving shock wave that was launched by the gravitational collapse of the core. W. D. Arnett and his Rice University colleagues demonstrated that the final shock burning would synthesize the non-alpha-nucleus isotopes more effectively than hydrostatic burning was able to do, suggesting that the expected shock-wave nucleosynthesis is an essential component of supernova nucleosynthesis. Together, shock-wave nucleosynthesis and hydrostatic-burning processes create most of the isotopes of the elements carbon (Z = 6), oxygen (Z = 8), and elements with Z = 10 to 28 (from neon to nickel). As a result of the ejection of the newly synthesized isotopes of the chemical elements by supernova explosions, their abundances steadily increased within interstellar gas. That increase became evident to astronomers from the initial abundances in newly born stars exceeding those in earlier-born stars.

Elements heavier than nickel are comparatively rare owing to the decline with atomic weight of their nuclear binding energies per nucleon, but they too are created in part within supernovae. Of greatest interest historically has been their synthesis by rapid capture of neutrons during the r-process, reflecting the common belief that supernova cores are likely to provide the necessary conditions. However, newer research has proposed a promising alternative (see the r-process below). The r-process isotopes are approximately 100,000 times less abundant than the primary chemical elements fused in supernova shells above. Furthermore, other nucleosynthesis processes in supernovae are thought to be responsible also for some nucleosynthesis of other heavy elements, notably, the proton capture process known as the rp-process, the slow capture of neutrons (s-process) in the helium-burning shells and in the carbon-burning shells of massive stars, and a photodisintegration process known as the γ-process (gamma-process). The latter synthesizes the lightest, most neutron-poor, isotopes of the elements heavier than iron from preexisting heavier isotopes.

== History ==
In 1946, Fred Hoyle proposed that elements heavier than hydrogen and helium would be produced by nucleosynthesis in the cores of massive stars. It had previously been thought that the elements we see in the modern universe had been largely produced during its formation. At this time, the nature of supernovae was unclear and Hoyle suggested that these heavy elements were distributed into space by rotational instability. In 1954, the theory of nucleosynthesis of heavy elements in massive stars was refined and combined with more understanding of supernovae to calculate the abundances of the elements from carbon to nickel. Key elements of the theory included:

- the prediction of the excited state in the ^{12}C nucleus that enables the triple-alpha process to burn resonantly to carbon and oxygen;
- the thermonuclear sequels of carbon-burning synthesizing Ne, Mg and Na; and
- oxygen-burning synthesizing silicon, aluminum, and sulfur.

The theory predicted that silicon burning would happen as the final stage of core fusion in massive stars, although nuclear science could not then calculate exactly how. Hoyle also predicted that the collapse of the evolved cores of massive stars was "inevitable" owing to their increasing rate of energy loss by neutrinos and that the resulting explosions would produce further nucleosynthesis of heavy elements and eject them into space.

In 1957, a paper by the authors E. M. Burbidge, G. R. Burbidge, W. A. Fowler, and Hoyle expanded and refined the theory and achieved widespread acclaim. It became known as the B²FH or BBFH paper, after the initials of its authors. The earlier papers fell into obscurity for decades after the more-famous B²FH paper did not attribute Hoyle's original description of nucleosynthesis in massive stars. Donald D. Clayton has attributed the obscurity also to Hoyle's 1954 paper describing its key equation only in words, and a lack of careful review by Hoyle of the B²FH draft by coauthors who had themselves not adequately studied Hoyle's paper. During his 1955 discussions in Cambridge with his co-authors in preparation of the B²FH first draft in 1956 in Pasadena, Hoyle's modesty had inhibited him from emphasizing to them the great achievements of his 1954 theory.

Thirteen years after the B²FH paper, W.D. Arnett and colleagues demonstrated that the final burning in the passing shock wave launched by collapse of the core could synthesize non-alpha-particle isotopes more effectively than hydrostatic burning could, suggesting that explosive nucleosynthesis is an essential component of supernova nucleosynthesis. A shock wave rebounded from matter collapsing onto the dense core, if strong enough to lead to mass ejection of the mantle of supernovae, would necessarily be strong enough to provide the sudden heating of the shells of massive stars needed for explosive thermonuclear burning within the mantle. Understanding how that shock wave can reach the mantle in the face of continuing infall onto the shock became the theoretical difficulty. Supernova observations assured that it must occur.

White dwarfs were proposed as possible progenitors of certain supernovae in the late 1960s, although a good understanding of the mechanism and nucleosynthesis involved did not develop until the 1980s. This showed that type Ia supernovae ejected very large amounts of radioactive nickel and lesser amounts of other iron-peak elements, with the nickel decaying rapidly to cobalt and then iron.

== Era of computer models ==
The papers of Hoyle (1946 and 1954) and of B²FH (1957) were written by those scientists before the advent of the age of computers. They relied on hand calculations, deep thought, physical intuition, and familiarity with details of nuclear physics. Brilliant as these founding papers were, a cultural disconnect soon emerged with a younger generation of scientists who began to construct computer programs that would eventually yield numerical answers for the advanced evolution of stars and the nucleosynthesis within them.

== Cause ==
A supernova is a violent explosion of a star that occurs under two principal scenarios. The first is that a white dwarf star, which is the remnant of a low-mass star that has exhausted its nuclear fuel, undergoes a thermonuclear explosion after its mass is increased beyond its Chandrasekhar limit by accreting nuclear-fuel mass from a more diffuse companion star (usually a red giant) with which it is in binary orbit. The resulting runaway nucleosynthesis completely destroys the star and ejects its mass into space. The second, and about threefold more common, scenario occurs when a massive star (12–35 times more massive than the sun), usually a supergiant at the critical time, reaches nickel-56 in its core nuclear fusion (or burning) processes. Without exothermic energy from fusion, the core of the pre-supernova massive star loses heat needed for pressure support, and collapses owing to the strong gravitational pull. The energy transfer from the core collapse causes the supernova display.

The nickel-56 isotope has one of the largest binding energies per nucleon of all isotopes, and is therefore the last isotope whose synthesis during core silicon burning releases energy by nuclear fusion, exothermically. The binding energy per nucleon declines for atomic weights heavier than A = 56, ending fusion's history of supplying thermal energy to the star. The thermal energy released when the infalling supernova mantle hits the semi-solid core is very large, about 10^{53} ergs, about a hundred times the energy released by the supernova as the kinetic energy of its ejected mass. Dozens of research papers have been published in the attempt to describe the hydrodynamics of how that small one percent of the infalling energy is transmitted to the overlying mantle in the face of continuous infall onto the core. That uncertainty remains in the full description of core-collapse supernovae.

Nuclear fusion reactions that produce elements heavier than iron absorb nuclear energy and are said to be endothermic reactions. When such reactions dominate, the internal temperature that supports the star's outer layers drops. Because the outer envelope is no longer sufficiently supported by the radiation pressure, the star's gravity pulls its mantle rapidly inward. As the star collapses, this mantle collides violently with the growing incompressible stellar core, which has a density almost as great as an atomic nucleus, producing a shockwave that rebounds outward through the unfused material of the outer shell. The increase of temperature by the passage of that shockwave is sufficient to induce fusion in that material, often called explosive nucleosynthesis. The energy deposited by the shockwave somehow leads to the star's explosion, dispersing fusing matter in the mantle above the core into interstellar space.

== Silicon burning ==
After a star completes the oxygen burning process, its core is composed primarily of silicon and sulfur. If it has sufficiently high mass, it further contracts until its core reaches temperatures in the range of 2.7–3.5 billion K (230–300 keV). At these temperatures, silicon and other isotopes suffer photoejection of nucleons by energetic thermal photons (γ) ejecting especially alpha particles (^{4}He). The nuclear process of silicon burning differs from earlier fusion stages of nucleosynthesis in that it entails a balance between alpha-particle captures and their inverse photo ejection which establishes abundances of all alpha-particle elements in the following sequence in which each alpha particle capture shown is opposed by its inverse reaction, namely, photo ejection of an alpha particle by the abundant thermal photons:

| ^{28}Si | + | ^{4}He | ⇌ | ^{32}S | + | γ |
| ^{32}S | + | ^{4}He | ⇌ | ^{36}Ar | + | γ |
| ^{36}Ar | + | ^{4}He | ⇌ | ^{40}Ca | + | γ |
| ^{40}Ca | + | ^{4}He | ⇌ | ^{44}Ti | + | γ |
| ^{44}Ti | + | ^{4}He | ⇌ | ^{48}Cr | + | γ |
| ^{48}Cr | + | ^{4}He | ⇌ | ^{52}Fe | + | γ |
| ^{52}Fe | + | ^{4}He | ⇌ | ^{56}Ni | + | γ |
| ^{56}Ni | + | ^{4}He | ⇌ | ^{60}Zn | + | γ |

The alpha-particle nuclei ^{44}Ti and those more massive in the final five reactions listed are all radioactive, but they decay after their ejection in supernova explosions into abundant isotopes of Ca, Ti, Cr, Fe and Ni. This post-supernova radioactivity became of great importance for the emergence of gamma-ray-line astronomy.

In these physical circumstances of rapid opposing reactions, namely alpha-particle capture and photo ejection of alpha particles, the abundances are not determined by alpha-particle-capture cross sections; rather they are determined by the values that the abundances must assume in order to balance the speeds of the rapid opposing-reaction currents. Each abundance takes on a stationary value that achieves that balance. This picture is called nuclear quasiequilibrium. Many computer calculations, for example, using the numerical rates of each reaction and of their reverse reactions have demonstrated that quasiequilibrium is not exact but does characterize well the computed abundances. Thus, the quasiequilibrium picture presents a comprehensible picture of what actually happens. It also fills in an uncertainty in Hoyle's 1954 theory. The quasiequilibrium buildup shuts off after ^{56}Ni because the alpha-particle captures become slower whereas the photo ejections from heavier nuclei become faster. Non-alpha-particle nuclei also participate, using a host of reactions similar to

^{36}Ar + neutron ⇌ ^{37}Ar + photon

and its inverse which set the stationary abundances of the non-alpha-particle isotopes, where the free densities of protons and neutrons are also established by the quasiequilibrium. However, the abundance of free neutrons is also proportional to the excess of neutrons over protons in the composition of the massive star; therefore the abundance of ^{37}Ar, using it as an example, is greater in ejecta from recent massive stars than it was from those in early stars of only H and He; therefore ^{37}Cl, to which ^{37}Ar decays after the nucleosynthesis, is called a "secondary isotope".

In interest of brevity, the next stage, an intricate photo-disintegration rearrangement, and the nuclear quasiequilibrium that it achieves, are referred to as silicon burning. The silicon burning in the star progresses through a temporal sequence of such nuclear quasiequilibria in which the abundance of ^{28}Si slowly declines and that of ^{56}Ni slowly increases. This amounts to a nuclear abundance change 2 ^{28}Si ≫ ^{56}Ni, which may be thought of as silicon burning into nickel ("burning" in the nuclear sense). The entire silicon-burning sequence lasts about one day in the core of a contracting massive star and stops after ^{56}Ni has become the dominant abundance. The final explosive burning caused when the supernova shock passes through the silicon-burning shell lasts only seconds, but its roughly 50% increase in the temperature causes furious nuclear burning, which becomes the major contributor to nucleosynthesis in the mass range 28–60 Da.

After the final ^{56}Ni stage, the star can no longer release energy via nuclear fusion, because a nucleus with 56 nucleons has the lowest mass per nucleon of all the elements in the sequence. The next step up in the alpha-particle chain would be ^{60}Zn. However ^{60}Zn has slightly more mass per nucleon than ^{56}Ni, and thus would require a thermodynamic energy loss rather than a gain as happened in all prior stages of nuclear burning.

^{56}Ni (which has 28 protons) has a half-life of 6.02 days and decays via β^{+} decay to ^{56}Co (27 protons), which in turn has a half-life of 77.3 days as it decays to ^{56}Fe (26 protons). However, only minutes are available for the ^{56}Ni to decay within the core of a massive star.

This establishes ^{56}Ni as the most abundant of the radioactive nuclei created in this way. Its radioactivity energizes the late supernova light curve and creates the pathbreaking opportunity for gamma-ray-line astronomy. See SN 1987A light curve for the aftermath of that opportunity.

Clayton and Meyer have recently generalized this process still further by what they have named the secondary supernova machine, attributing the increasing radioactivity that energizes late supernova displays to the storage of increasing Coulomb energy within the quasiequilibrium nuclei called out above as the quasiequilibria shift from primarily ^{28}Si to primarily ^{56}Ni. The visible displays are powered by the decay of that excess Coulomb energy.

During this phase of the core contraction, the potential energy of gravitational compression heats the interior to roughly three billion kelvins, which briefly maintains pressure support and opposes rapid core contraction. However, since no additional heat energy can be generated via new fusion reactions, the final unopposed contraction rapidly accelerates into a collapse lasting only a few seconds. At that point, the central portion of the star is crushed into either a neutron star or, if the star is massive enough, into a black hole.

The outer layers of the star are blown off in an explosion triggered by the outward moving supernova shock, known as a Type II supernova whose displays last days to months. The escaping portion of the supernova core may initially contain a large density of free neutrons, which may synthesize, in about one second while inside the star, roughly half of the elements in the universe that are heavier than iron via a rapid neutron-capture mechanism known as the r-process. See below.

== Nuclides synthesized ==
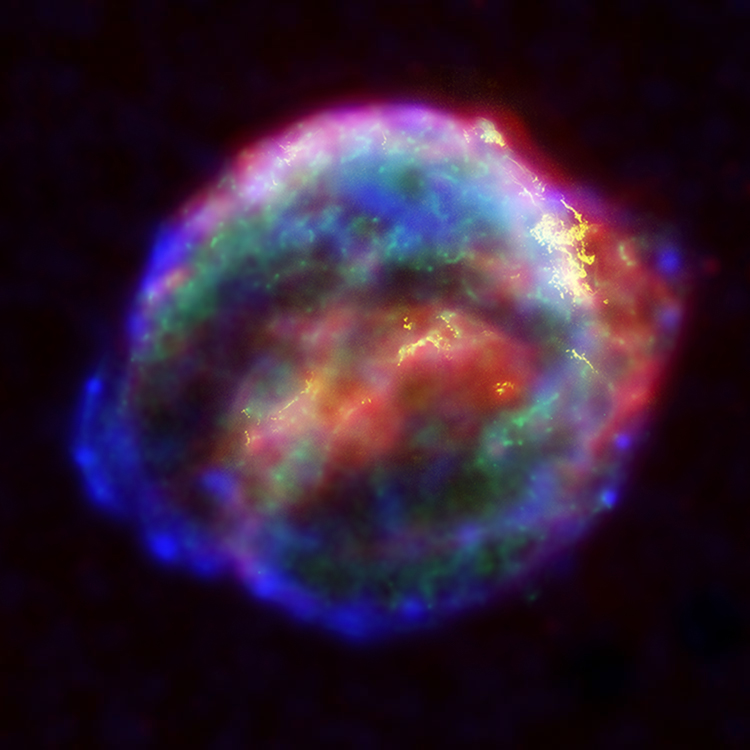
Composite image of Kepler's supernova from pictures by the Spitzer Space Telescope, Hubble Space Telescope, and Chandra X-ray Observatory.

Stars with initial masses less than about eight times the sun never develop a core large enough to collapse and they eventually lose their atmospheres to become white dwarfs, stable cooling spheres of carbon supported by the pressure of degenerate electrons. Nucleosynthesis within those lighter stars is therefore limited to nuclides that were fused in material located above the final white dwarf. This limits their modest yields returned to interstellar gas to carbon-13 and nitrogen-14, and to isotopes heavier than iron by slow capture of neutrons (the s-process).

A significant minority of white dwarfs will explode, however, either because they are in a binary orbit with a companion star that loses mass to the stronger gravitational field of the white dwarf, or because of a merger with another white dwarf. The result is a white dwarf which exceeds its Chandrasekhar limit and explodes as a type Ia supernova, synthesizing about a solar mass of radioactive ^{56}Ni isotopes, together with smaller amounts of other iron peak elements. The subsequent radioactive decay of the nickel to iron keeps Type Ia optically very bright for weeks and creates more than half of all the iron in the universe.

Virtually all of the remainder of stellar nucleosynthesis occurs, however, in stars that are massive enough to end as core collapse supernovae. In the pre-supernova massive star this includes helium burning, carbon burning, oxygen burning and silicon burning. Much of that yield may never leave the star but instead disappears into its collapsed core. The yield that is ejected is substantially fused in last-second explosive burning caused by the shock wave launched by core collapse. Prior to core collapse, fusion of elements between silicon and iron occurs only in the largest of stars, and then in limited amounts. Thus, the nucleosynthesis of the abundant primary elements defined as those that could be synthesized in stars of initially only hydrogen and helium (left by the Big Bang), is substantially limited to core-collapse supernova nucleosynthesis.

== r-process nucleosynthesis ==
A version of the periodic table indicating the main origin of elements found on Earth. All elements past plutonium (element 94) are man-made.

During supernova nucleosynthesis, the r-process creates very neutron-rich heavy isotopes, which decay after the event to the first stable isotope, thereby creating the neutron-rich stable isotopes of all heavy elements. This neutron capture process occurs in high neutron density with high temperature conditions.

In the r-process, any heavy nuclei are bombarded with a large neutron flux to form highly unstable neutron rich nuclei which very rapidly undergo beta decay to form more stable nuclei with higher atomic number and the same atomic mass. The neutron density is extremely high, about 10^{22–24} neutrons per cubic centimeter.

Initial calculations of an evolving r-process, showing the evolution of calculated results with time, also suggested that the r-process abundances are a superposition of differing neutron fluences. Small fluence produces the first r-process abundance peak near atomic weight A = 130 but no actinides, whereas large fluence produces the actinides uranium and thorium but no longer contains the A = 130 abundance peak. These processes occur in a fraction of a second to a few seconds, depending on details. Hundreds of subsequent papers published have utilized this time-dependent approach. The only modern nearby supernova, 1987A, has not revealed r-process enrichments. Modern thinking is that the r-process yield may be ejected from some supernovae but swallowed up in others as part of the residual neutron star or black hole.

Entirely new astronomical data about the r-process was discovered in 2017 when the LIGO and Virgo gravitational-wave observatories discovered a merger of two neutron stars that had previously been orbiting one another. That can happen when both massive stars in orbit with one another become core-collapse supernovae, leaving neutron-star remnants.

The localization on the sky of the source of those gravitational waves radiated by that orbital collapse and merger of the two neutron stars, creating a black hole, but with significant ejected mass of highly neutronized matter, enabled several teams to discover and study the remaining optical counterpart of the merger, finding spectroscopic evidence of r-process material thrown off by the merging neutron stars.

The bulk of this material seems to consist of two types: Hot blue masses of highly radioactive r-process matter of lower-mass-range heavy nuclei (A < 140) and cooler red masses of higher mass-number r-process nuclei (A > 140) rich in actinides (such as uranium, thorium, californium etc.). When released from the huge internal pressure of the neutron star, this neutron-rich spherical ejecta expands and radiates detected optical light for about a week. Such duration of luminosity would not be possible without heating by internal radioactive decay, which is provided by r-process nuclei near their waiting points. Two distinct mass regions (A < 140 and A > 140) for the r-process yields have been known since the first time dependent calculations of the r-process. Because of these spectroscopic features it has been argued that r-process nucleosynthesis in the Milky Way may have been primarily ejecta from neutron-star mergers rather than from supernovae.

== See also ==
- Big Bang nucleosynthesis
- Critical mass
- Nuclear fission
- Nuclear fusion
- Nucleosynthesis
- Primordial nuclide
- Radioactive decay
- Stellar nucleosynthesis

== Other reading ==
- Burbidge, E. M.; Burbidge, G. R.; Fowler, W.A.; Hoyle, F. (1957). "Synthesis of the Elements in Stars". Reviews of Modern Physics. 29 (4): 547–650. Bibcode:1957RvMP...29..547B. doi:10.1103/RevModPhys.29.547.
- Clayton, D. (2003). Handbook of isotopes in the cosmos. Cambridge University Press. ISBN 978-0-521-82381-4.
