= HIP 17453 =

A-type star in the constellation Taurus

Observation data Epoch J2000 Equinox ICRS
- Constellation: Taurus
- Right ascension: 03^{h} 44^{m} 28.2038^{s}
- Declination: +20° 55′ 43.449″
- Apparent magnitude (V): +6.074±0.010

Characteristics
- Evolutionary stage: main sequence
- Spectral type: A0Vp (λ Boo) + L2±1
- B−V color index: +0.028±0.025

Astrometry
Radial velocity (R_{v})	+19±1 km/s
Proper motion (μ)	RA: +26.616 mas/yr Dec.: −14.545 mas/yr
Parallax (π)	12.3772±0.0490 mas
Distance	264 ± 1 ly (80.8 ± 0.3 pc)
Absolute magnitude (M_{V})	+1.63

Orbit
Period (P)	3,340+4,190 −1,270 yr
Semi-major axis (a)	287+206 −78 au
Eccentricity (e)	0.79+0.16 −0.27
Inclination (i)	106.8+26.0 −9.6°
Longitude of the node (Ω)	59+12 −8°
Periastron epoch (T)	0.12+0.04 −0.06
Argument of periastron (ω) (secondary)	159+32 −40°

Details

A
Mass	2.08±0.09 M_{☉}
Radius	1.780±0.049 R_{☉}
Luminosity	23±1 L_{☉}
Surface gravity (log g)	4.32±0.06 cgs
Temperature	9,400±250 K
Metallicity	$\begin{smallmatrix}\left[\ce{M}/\ce{H}\right]\end{smallmatrix}$ = −0.06±0.10
Rotational velocity (v sin i)	124±12 km/s
Age	280±125 Myr

B
Mass	53+10 −8 M_{Jup}
Radius	0.11 ± 0.01 (Note: Calculated, using the Stefan-Boltzmann law and the star's effective temperature and luminosity, with respect to the solar nominal effective temperature of 5,772 K: $$\sqrt{\biggl(\frac{5,772}{1,953}\biggr)^4 \cdot 10^{-3.79}} = 0.11\ R_\odot.$$) R_{☉}
Luminosity	1.62+0.24 −0.21×10^{−4} L_{☉}
Surface gravity (log g)	5.0–5.5 cgs
Temperature	1,953+84 −78 K
Age	280±125 Myr

Other designations
- BD+20°621, HD 23258, HIP 17453, HR 1137, TYC 1260-1427-1

Database references
SIMBAD	data

HIP 17453 is a star in the constellation Taurus. At an apparent magnitude of +6.074, it is faintly visible to the naked eye in locations far from light pollution. Parallax measurements give a distance of 264 light-years (80.8 parsecs).

== Characteristics ==
The spectrum of this star matches a spectral class of A0Vp (λ Boo), with the luminosity class V indicating it is a main sequence star fusing atoms of hydrogen into helium at its core. The spectrum also indicates that it is a Lambda Boötis star. These stars are characterized by the underabundance of iron peak metals and solar abundances of volatile elements such as carbon, nitrogen, oxygen and sulfur.

HIP 17453 is an estimated 280±125 million years old, with 2.08 times the mass of the Sun and 1.78 times the Sun's radius. It radiates 23 times the Sun's luminosity from its photosphere at an effective temperature of 9,400 K. This temperature gives it the white hue typical of an A-type star.

== Brown dwarf ==
In 2026, a brown dwarf, named HIP 17453 B, was reported around the primary star by the C-BASS survey, which aims to detect companions around B and A-type stars. It was the first detection of the survey. The detection was made using the Near-Infrared Camera 2 adaptive optics instrument aboard the Keck 2 Telescope. Using medium-resolution spectral observations of the GNIRS spectograph aboard the Gemini North Telescope, the team obtained a spectral type of L2±1.

HIP 17453 B has a luminosity of 1.6×10^{−4} L_{☉} and an age of 280±125 Myr. Evolutionary models predict a mass of 53 M_{J} and a temperature of 1,950 K for its luminosity and age. The Stefan–Boltzmann law implies a radius of 0.11 ± 0.01 R_{☉} for the given luminosity and temperature.

The orbital motion of the brown dwarf has been tracked with a timescale of 10 years, making it possible to compute an orbit. However, since only a small portion of the full orbital path is known, the orbital elements are uncertain. The brown dwarfs orbits with a period of 3,340+4,190
−1,270 years, with a semi-major axis of 287+206
−78 au and an eccentricity of 0.79+0.16
−0.27. The inclination is close to edge-on, at 106.8°+26.0°
−9.6°.
