= Stellar evolution =

Changes to stars over their lifespans

Representative lifetimes of stars as a function of their masses

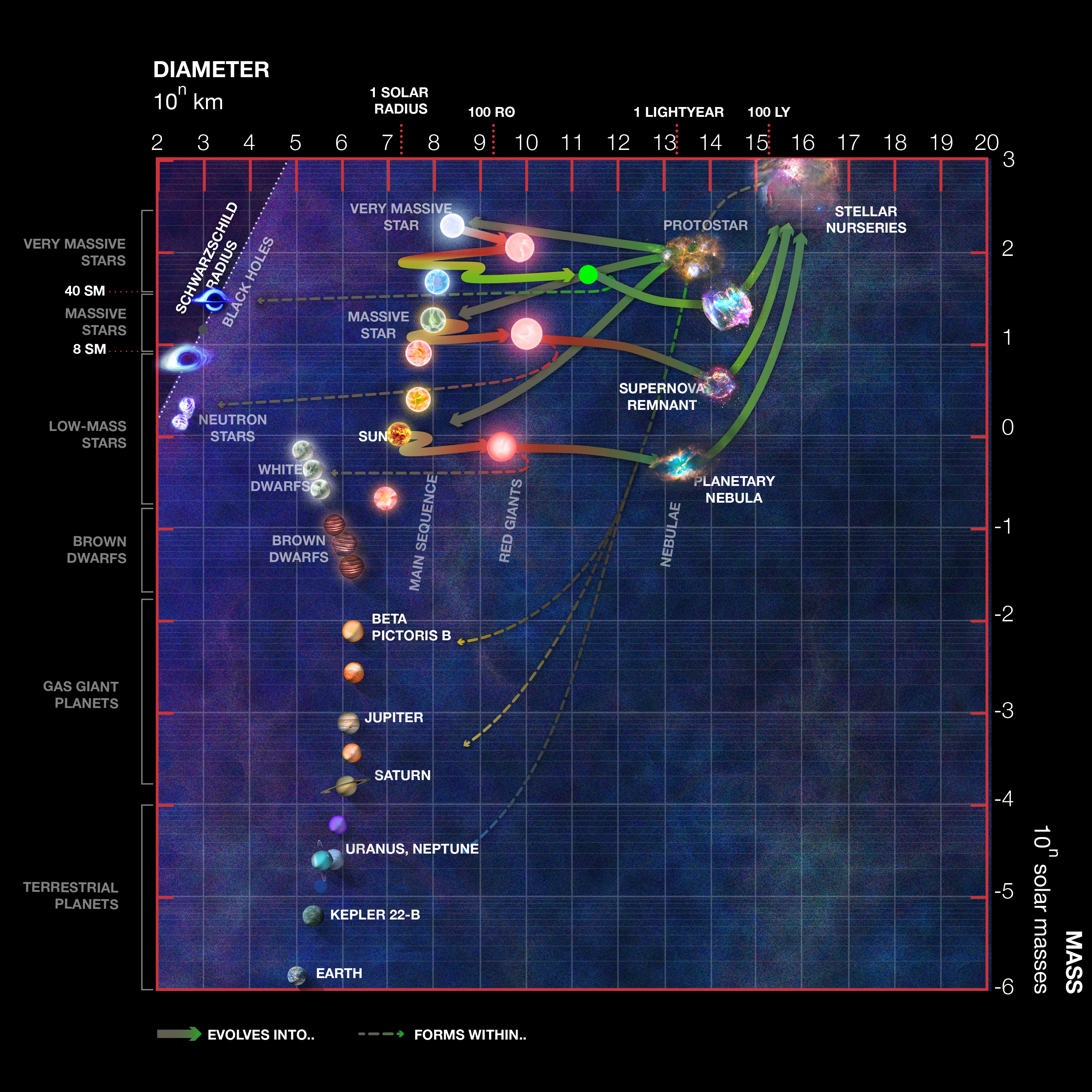
A mass–radius (log) plot of several celestial bodies and their evolution

Stellar evolution is the process by which a star changes over the course of time. Depending on the mass of the star, its lifetime can range from a few million years for the most massive to trillions of years for the least massive, which is considerably longer than the current age of the universe. The table shows the lifetimes of stars as a function of their masses. All stars are formed from collapsing clouds of gas and dust, often called nebulae or molecular clouds. Over the course of millions of years, these protostars settle down into a state of equilibrium, becoming what is known as a main-sequence star.

Nuclear fusion powers a star for most of its existence. Initially the energy is generated by the fusion of hydrogen atoms at the core of the main-sequence star. Later, as the preponderance of atoms at the core becomes helium, stars like the Sun begin to fuse hydrogen along a spherical shell surrounding the core. This process causes the star to gradually grow in size, passing through the subgiant stage until it reaches the red-giant phase. Stars with at least half the mass of the Sun can also begin to generate energy through the fusion of helium at their core, whereas more-massive stars can fuse heavier elements along a series of concentric shells. Once a star like the Sun has exhausted its nuclear fuel, its core collapses into a dense white dwarf and the outer layers are expelled as a planetary nebula. Stars with around ten or more times the mass of the Sun can explode in a supernova as their inert iron cores collapse into an extremely dense neutron star or black hole. Although the universe is not old enough for any of the smallest red dwarfs to have reached the end of their existence, stellar models suggest they will slowly become brighter and hotter before running out of hydrogen fuel and becoming low-mass white dwarfs.

Stellar evolution is not studied by observing the life of a single star, as most stellar changes occur too slowly to be detected, even over many centuries. Instead, astrophysicists come to understand how stars evolve by observing numerous stars at various points in their lifetime, and by simulating stellar structure using computer models.

== Star formation ==
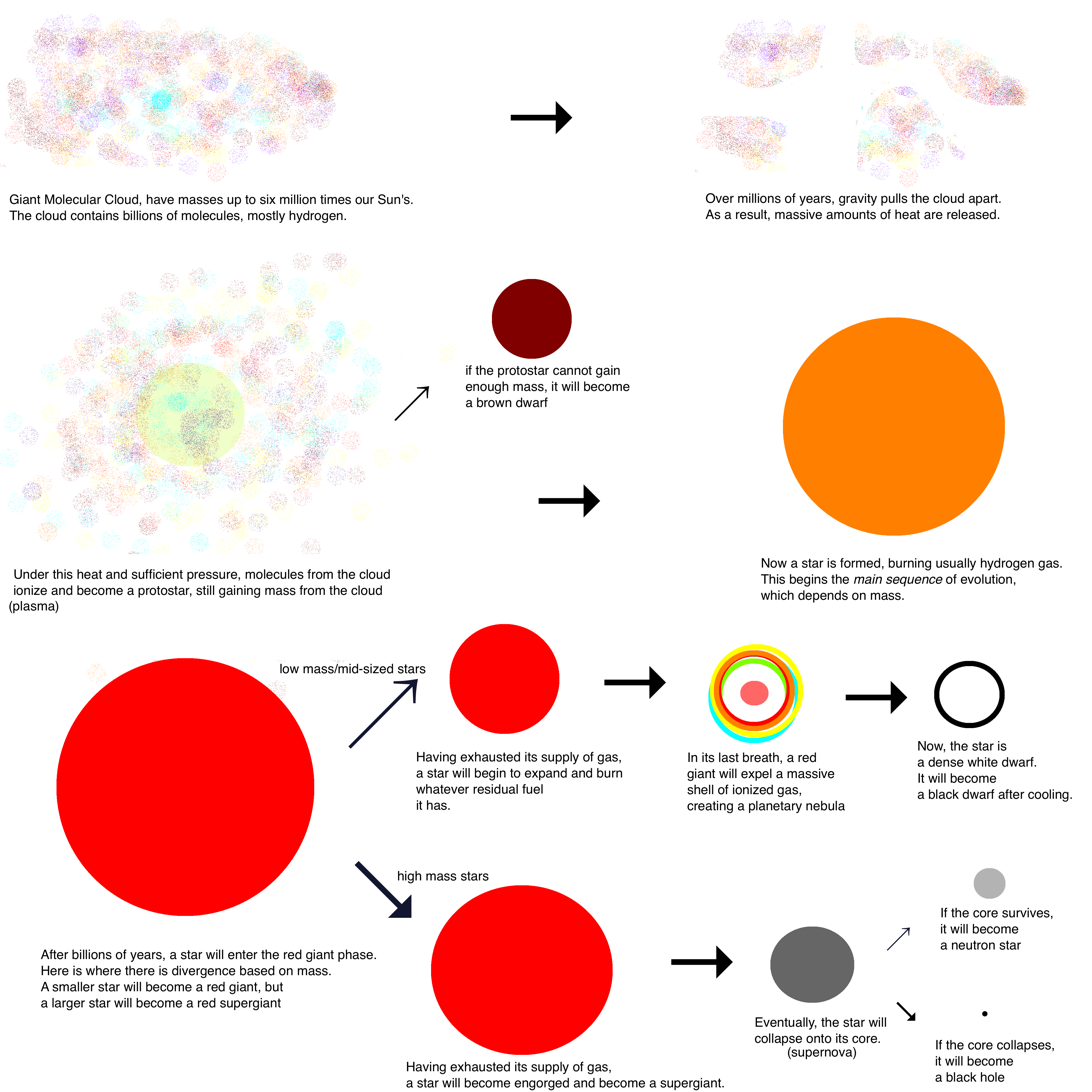
Simplistic representation of the stages of stellar evolution

=== Protostar ===
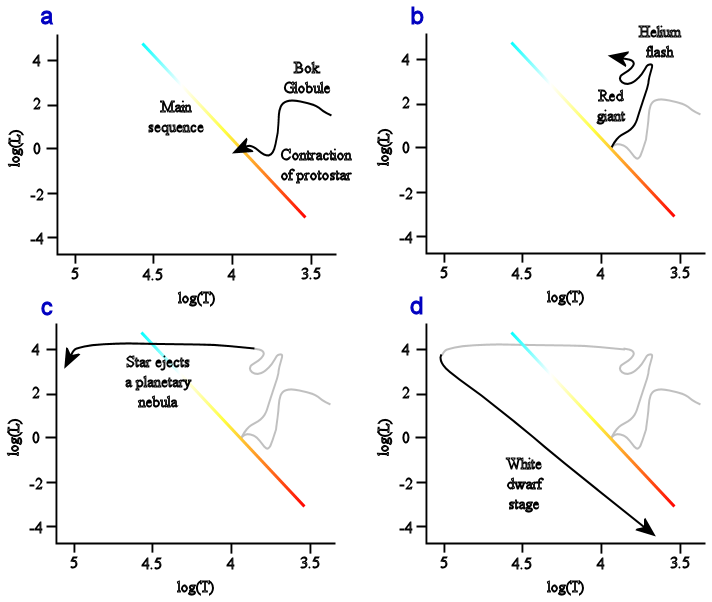
Schematic of stellar evolution

Stellar evolution starts with the gravitational collapse of a giant molecular cloud. Typical giant molecular clouds are roughly 100 light-years (9.5×10^{14} km) across and contain up to 6,000,000 solar masses (1.2×10^{37} kg). As it collapses, a giant molecular cloud breaks into smaller and smaller pieces. In each of these fragments, the collapsing gas releases gravitational potential energy as heat. As its temperature and pressure increase, a fragment condenses into a rotating ball of superhot gas known as a protostar. Filamentary structures are truly ubiquitous in the molecular cloud. Dense molecular filaments will fragment into gravitationally bound cores, which are the precursors of stars. Continuous accretion of gas, geometrical bending, and magnetic fields may control the detailed fragmentation manner of the filaments. In supercritical filaments, observations have revealed quasi-periodic chains of dense cores with spacing comparable to the filament inner width, and embedded two protostars with gas outflows.

A protostar continues to grow by accretion of gas and dust from the molecular cloud, becoming a pre-main-sequence star as it reaches its final mass. Further development is determined by its mass. Mass is typically compared to the mass of the Sun: 1.0 M_{☉} (2.0×10^{30} kg) means 1 solar mass.

Protostars are encompassed in dust, and are thus more readily visible at infrared wavelengths. Observations from the Wide-field Infrared Survey Explorer (WISE) have been especially important for unveiling numerous galactic protostars and their parent star clusters.

=== Brown dwarfs and sub-stellar objects ===
Protostars with masses less than roughly 0.08 M_{☉} (1.6×10^{29} kg) never reach temperatures high enough for nuclear fusion of hydrogen to begin. These are known as brown dwarfs. The International Astronomical Union defines brown dwarfs as stars massive enough to fuse deuterium at some point in their lives (13 Jupiter masses (M_{J}), 2.5 × 10^{28} kg, or 0.0125 M_{☉}). Objects smaller than 13 M_{J} are classified as sub-brown dwarfs (but if they orbit around another stellar object they are classified as planets). Both types, deuterium-burning and not, shine dimly and fade away slowly, cooling gradually over hundreds of millions of years.

=== Main sequence stellar mass objects ===
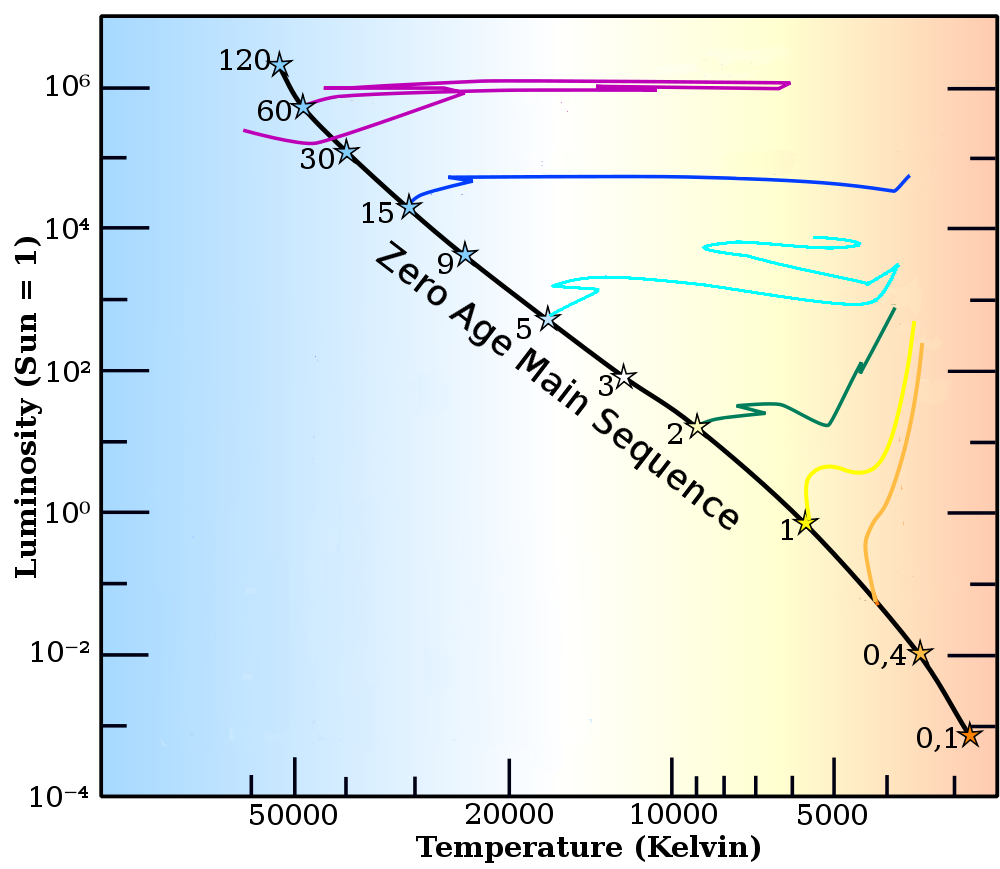

The evolutionary tracks of stars with different initial masses on the Hertzsprung–Russell diagram. The tracks start once the star has evolved to the main sequence and stop when fusion stops (for massive stars) and at the end of the red-giant branch (for stars 1 M_{☉} and less).
A yellow track is shown for the Sun, which will become a red giant after its main-sequence phase ends before expanding further along the asymptotic giant branch, which will be the last phase in which the Sun undergoes fusion.

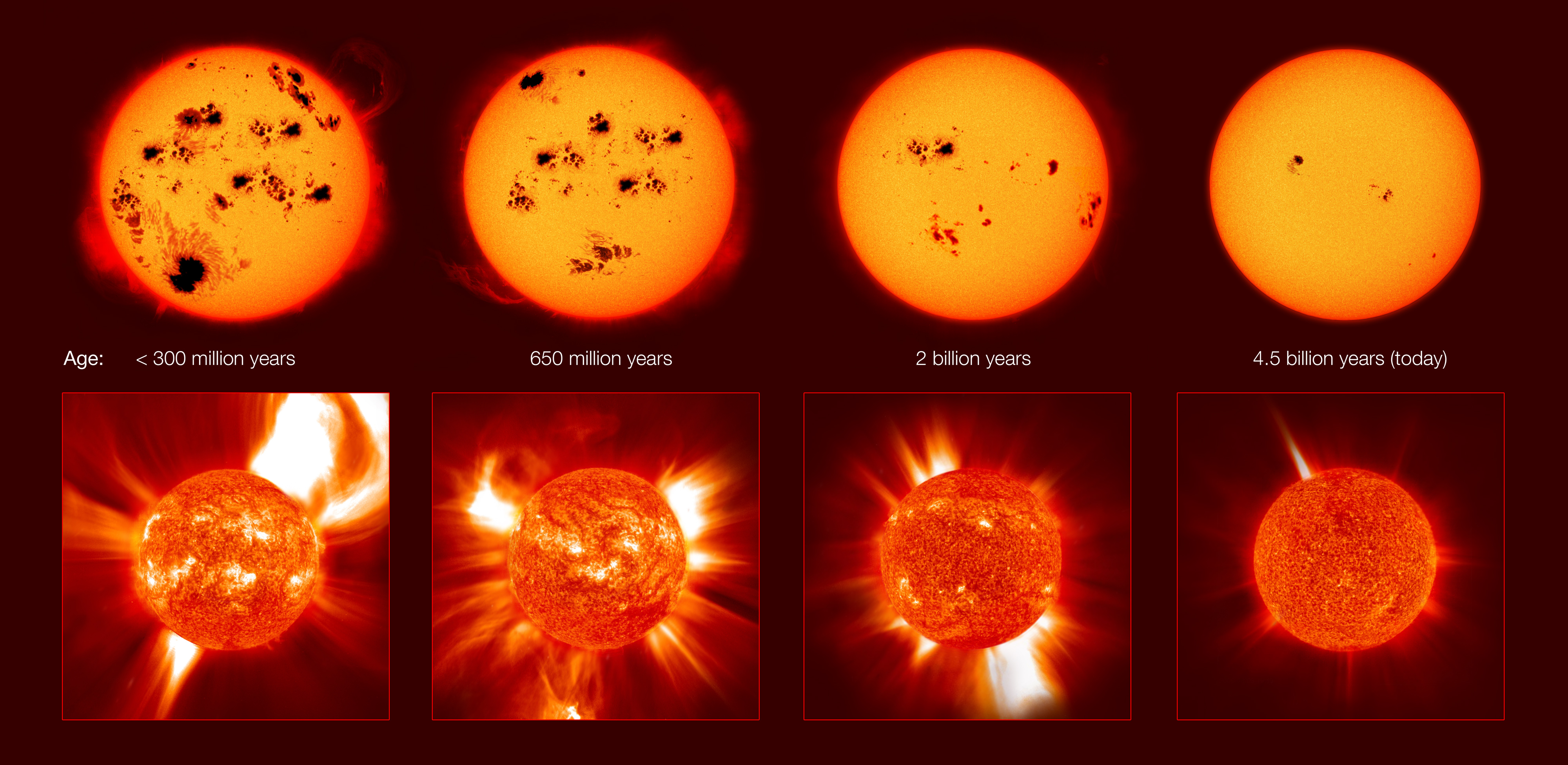
The violent youth of stars like the Sun

For a more-massive protostar, the core temperature will eventually reach 10 million kelvin, initiating the proton–proton chain reaction and allowing hydrogen to fuse, first to deuterium and then to helium. In stars of slightly over 1 M_{☉} (2.0×10^{30} kg), the carbon–nitrogen–oxygen fusion reaction (CNO cycle) contributes a large portion of the energy generation. The onset of nuclear fusion leads relatively quickly to a hydrostatic equilibrium in which energy released by the core maintains a high gas pressure, balancing the weight of the star's matter and preventing further gravitational collapse. The star thus evolves rapidly to a stable state, beginning the main-sequence phase of its evolution.

A new star will sit at a specific point on the main sequence of the Hertzsprung–Russell diagram, with the main-sequence spectral type depending upon the mass of the star. Small, relatively cold, low-mass red dwarfs fuse hydrogen slowly and will remain on the main sequence for hundreds of billions of years or longer, whereas massive, hot O-type stars will leave the main sequence after just a few million years. A mid-sized yellow dwarf star, like the Sun, will remain on the main sequence for about 10 billion years. The Sun is thought to be in the middle of its main sequence lifespan.

=== Planetary system ===
A star may gain a protoplanetary disk, which furthermore can develop into a planetary system.

== Mature stars ==
Internal structures of main-sequence stars, convection zones with arrowed cycles and radiative zones with red flashes. To the left a low-mass red dwarf, in the center a mid-sized yellow dwarf and at the right a massive blue-white main-sequence star.

Eventually the star's core exhausts its supply of hydrogen and the star begins to evolve off the main sequence. Without the outward radiation pressure generated by the fusion of hydrogen to counteract the force of gravity, the core contracts until either electron degeneracy pressure becomes sufficient to oppose gravity or the core becomes hot enough (around 100 MK) for helium fusion to begin. Which of these happens first depends upon the star's mass.

=== Low-mass stars ===
What happens after a low-mass star ceases to produce energy through fusion has not been directly observed; the universe is around 13.8 billion years old, which is less time (by several orders of magnitude, in some cases) than it takes for fusion to cease in such stars.

Recent astrophysical models suggest that red dwarfs of 0.1 M_{☉} may stay on the main sequence for some six to twelve trillion years, gradually increasing in both temperature and luminosity, and take several hundred billion years more to collapse, slowly, into a white dwarf. Such stars will not become red giants as the whole star is a convection zone and it will not develop a degenerate helium core with a shell burning hydrogen. Instead, hydrogen fusion will proceed until almost the whole star is helium.

Slightly more massive stars do expand into red giants, but their helium cores are not massive enough to reach the temperatures required for helium fusion so they never reach the tip of the red-giant branch. When hydrogen shell burning finishes, these stars move directly off the red-giant branch like a post-asymptotic-giant-branch (AGB) star, but at lower luminosity, to become a white dwarf. A star with an initial mass about 0.6 M_{☉} will be able to reach temperatures high enough to fuse helium, and these "mid-sized" stars go on to further stages of evolution beyond the red-giant branch.

=== Mid-sized stars ===
The evolutionary track of a solar mass, solar metallicity, star from main sequence to post-AGB

Stars of roughly 0.6–10 M_{☉} become red giants, which are large non-main-sequence stars of stellar classification K or M. Red giants lie along the right edge of the Hertzsprung–Russell diagram due to their red color and large luminosity. Examples include Aldebaran in the constellation Taurus and Arcturus in the constellation of Boötes.

Mid-sized stars are red giants during two different phases of their post-main-sequence evolution: red-giant-branch stars, with inert cores made of helium and hydrogen-burning shells, and asymptotic-giant-branch stars, with inert cores made of carbon and helium-burning shells inside the hydrogen-burning shells. Between these two phases, stars spend a period on the horizontal branch with a helium-fusing core. Many of these helium-fusing stars cluster towards the cool end of the horizontal branch as K-type giants and are referred to as red clump giants.

==== Subgiant phase ====
When a star exhausts the hydrogen in its core, it leaves the main sequence and begins to fuse hydrogen in a shell outside the core. The core increases in mass as the shell produces more helium. Depending on the mass of the helium core, this continues for several million to one or two billion years, with the star expanding and cooling at a similar or slightly lower luminosity to its main sequence state. Eventually either the core becomes degenerate, in stars around the mass of the sun, or the outer layers cool sufficiently to become opaque, in more massive stars. Either of these changes cause the hydrogen shell to increase in temperature and the luminosity of the star to increase, at which point the star expands onto the red-giant branch.

==== Red-giant-branch phase ====
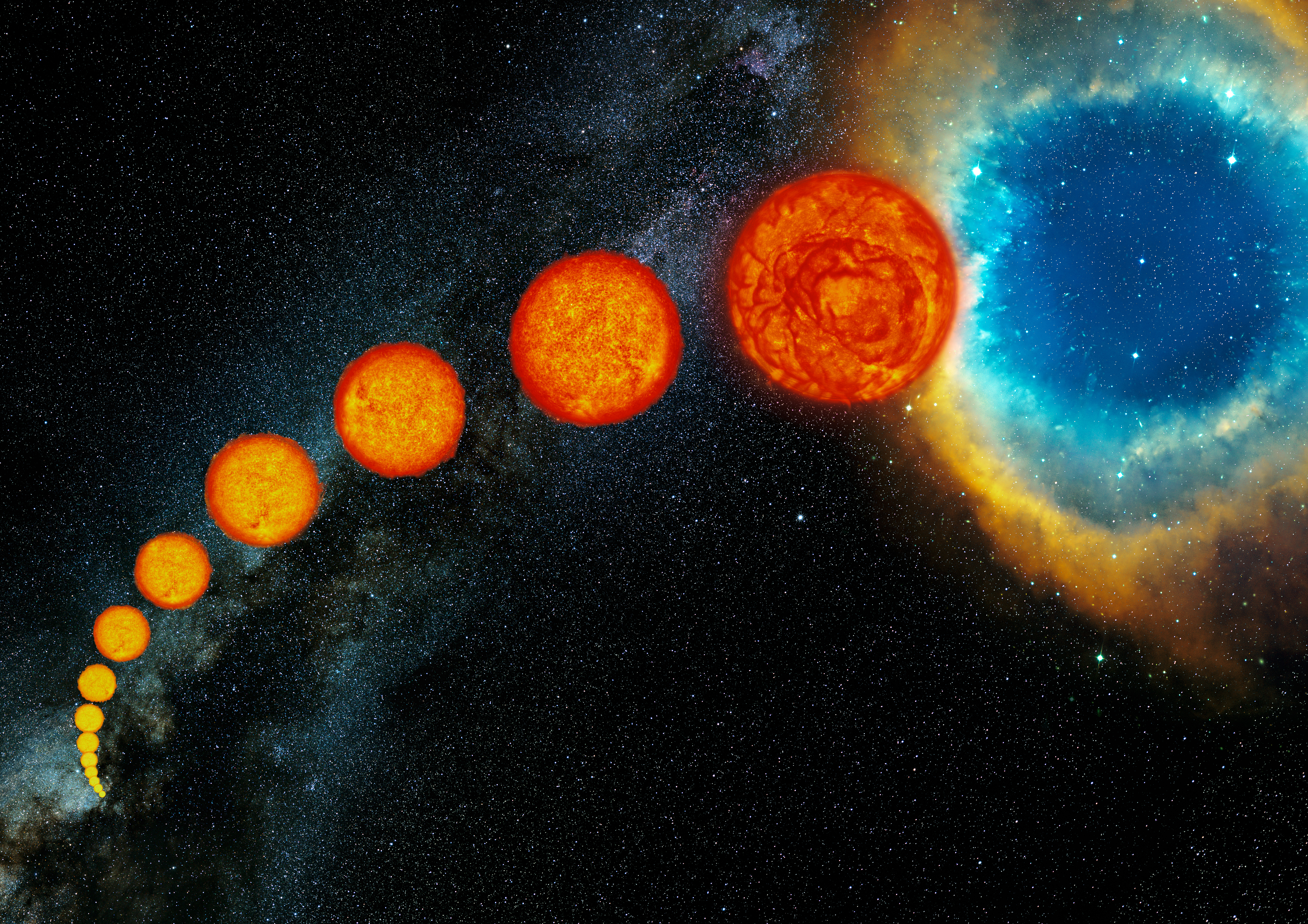
Artist's depiction of the life cycle of a Sun-like star, starting as a main-sequence star at lower left then expanding through the subgiant and giant phases, until its outer envelope is expelled to form a planetary nebula at upper right

The expanding outer layers of the star are convective, with the material being mixed by turbulence from near the fusing regions up to the surface of the star. For all but the lowest-mass stars, the fused material has remained deep in the stellar interior prior to this point, so the convecting envelope makes fusion products visible at the star's surface for the first time. At this stage of evolution, the results are subtle, with the largest effects, alterations to the isotopes of hydrogen and helium, being unobservable. The effects of the CNO cycle appear at the surface during the first dredge-up, with lower ^{12}C/^{13}C ratios and altered proportions of carbon and nitrogen. These are detectable with spectroscopy and have been measured for many evolved stars.

The helium core continues to grow on the red-giant branch. It is no longer in thermal equilibrium, either degenerate or above the Schönberg–Chandrasekhar limit, so it increases in temperature which causes the rate of fusion in the hydrogen shell to increase. The star increases in luminosity towards the tip of the red-giant branch. Red-giant-branch stars with a degenerate helium core all reach the tip with very similar core masses and very similar luminosities, although the more massive of the red giants become hot enough to ignite helium fusion before that point.

==== Horizontal branch ====
In the helium cores of stars in the 0.6 to 2.0 solar mass range, which are largely supported by electron degeneracy pressure, helium fusion will ignite on a timescale of days in a helium flash. In the nondegenerate cores of more massive stars, the ignition of helium fusion occurs relatively slowly with no flash. The nuclear power released during the helium flash is very large, on the order of 10^{8} times the luminosity of the Sun for a few days and 10^{11} times the luminosity of the Sun (roughly the luminosity of the Milky Way Galaxy) for a few seconds. However, the energy is consumed by the thermal expansion of the initially degenerate core and thus cannot be seen from outside the star. Due to the expansion of the core, the hydrogen fusion in the overlying layers slows and total energy generation decreases. The star contracts, although not all the way to the main sequence, and it migrates to the horizontal branch on the Hertzsprung–Russell diagram, gradually shrinking in radius and increasing its surface temperature.

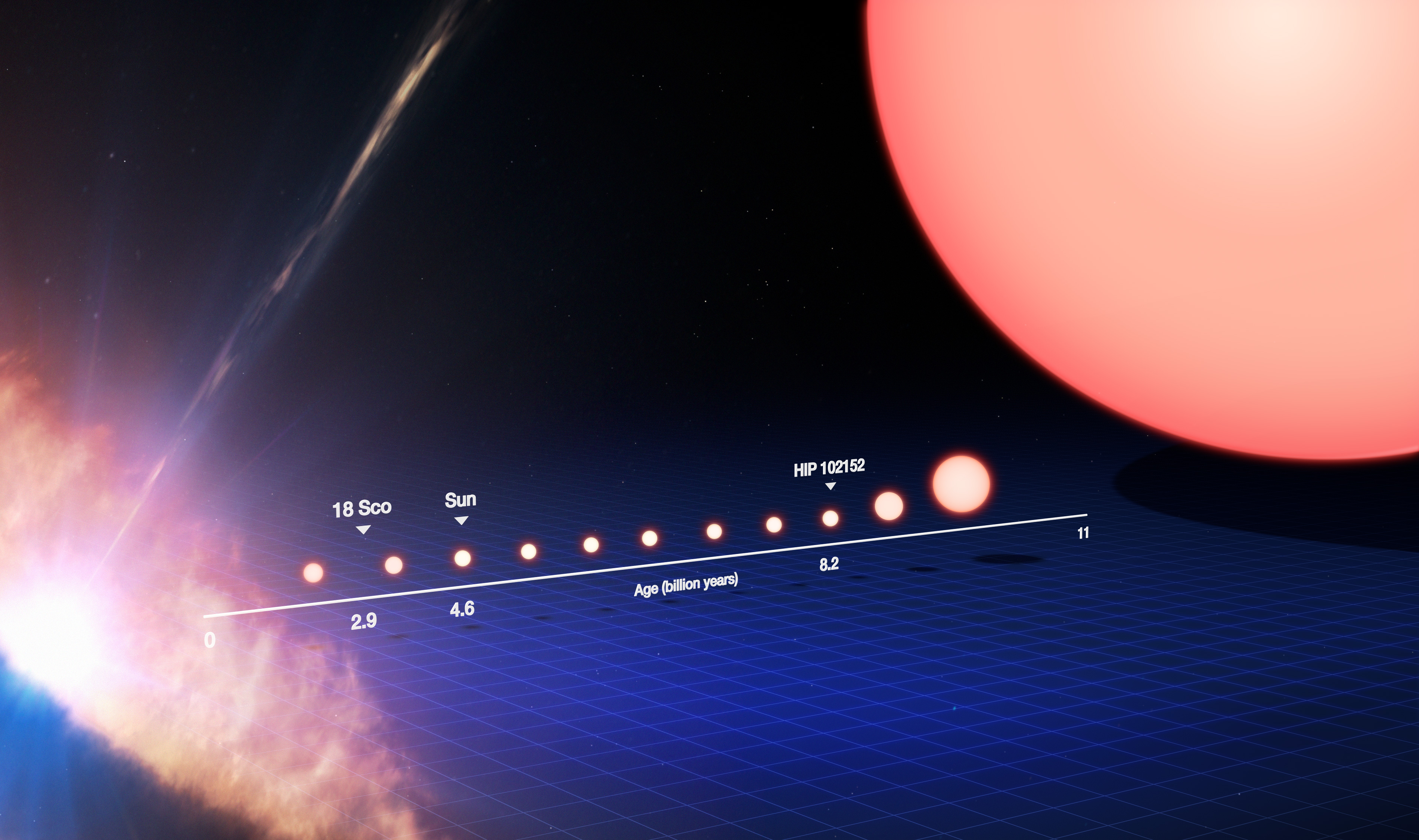
The change in size with time of a Sun-like star

Core helium flash stars evolve to the red end of the horizontal branch but do not migrate to higher temperatures before they gain a degenerate carbon-oxygen core and start helium shell burning. These stars are often observed as a red clump of stars in the colour-magnitude diagram of a cluster, hotter and less luminous than the red giants. Higher-mass stars with larger helium cores move along the horizontal branch to higher temperatures, some becoming unstable pulsating stars in the yellow instability strip (RR Lyrae variables), whereas some become even hotter and can form a blue tail or blue hook to the horizontal branch. The morphology of the horizontal branch depends on parameters such as metallicity, age, and helium content, but the exact details are still being modelled.

==== Asymptotic-giant-branch phase ====
After a star has consumed the helium at the core, hydrogen and helium fusion continues in shells around a hot core of carbon and oxygen. The star follows the asymptotic giant branch on the Hertzsprung–Russell diagram, paralleling the original red-giant evolution, but with even faster energy generation (which lasts for a shorter time). Although helium is being burnt in a shell, the majority of the energy is produced by hydrogen burning in a shell further from the core of the star. Helium from these hydrogen burning shells drops towards the center of the star and periodically the energy output from the helium shell increases dramatically. This is known as a thermal pulse and they occur towards the end of the asymptotic-giant-branch phase, sometimes even into the post-asymptotic-giant-branch phase. Depending on mass and composition, there may be several to hundreds of thermal pulses.

There is a phase on the ascent of the asymptotic-giant-branch where a deep convective zone forms and can bring carbon from the core to the surface. This is known as the second dredge up, and in some stars there may even be a third dredge up. In this way a carbon star is formed, very cool and strongly reddened stars showing strong carbon lines in their spectra. A process known as hot bottom burning may convert carbon into oxygen and nitrogen before it can be dredged to the surface, and the interaction between these processes determines the observed luminosities and spectra of carbon stars in particular clusters.

Another well known class of asymptotic-giant-branch stars is the Mira variables, which pulsate with well-defined periods of tens to hundreds of days and large amplitudes up to about 10 magnitudes (in the visual, total luminosity changes by a much smaller amount). In more-massive stars the stars become more luminous and the pulsation period is longer, leading to enhanced mass loss, and the stars become heavily obscured at visual wavelengths. These stars can be observed as OH/IR stars, pulsating in the infrared and showing OH maser activity. These stars are clearly oxygen rich, in contrast to the carbon stars, but both must be produced by dredge ups.

==== Post-AGB ====
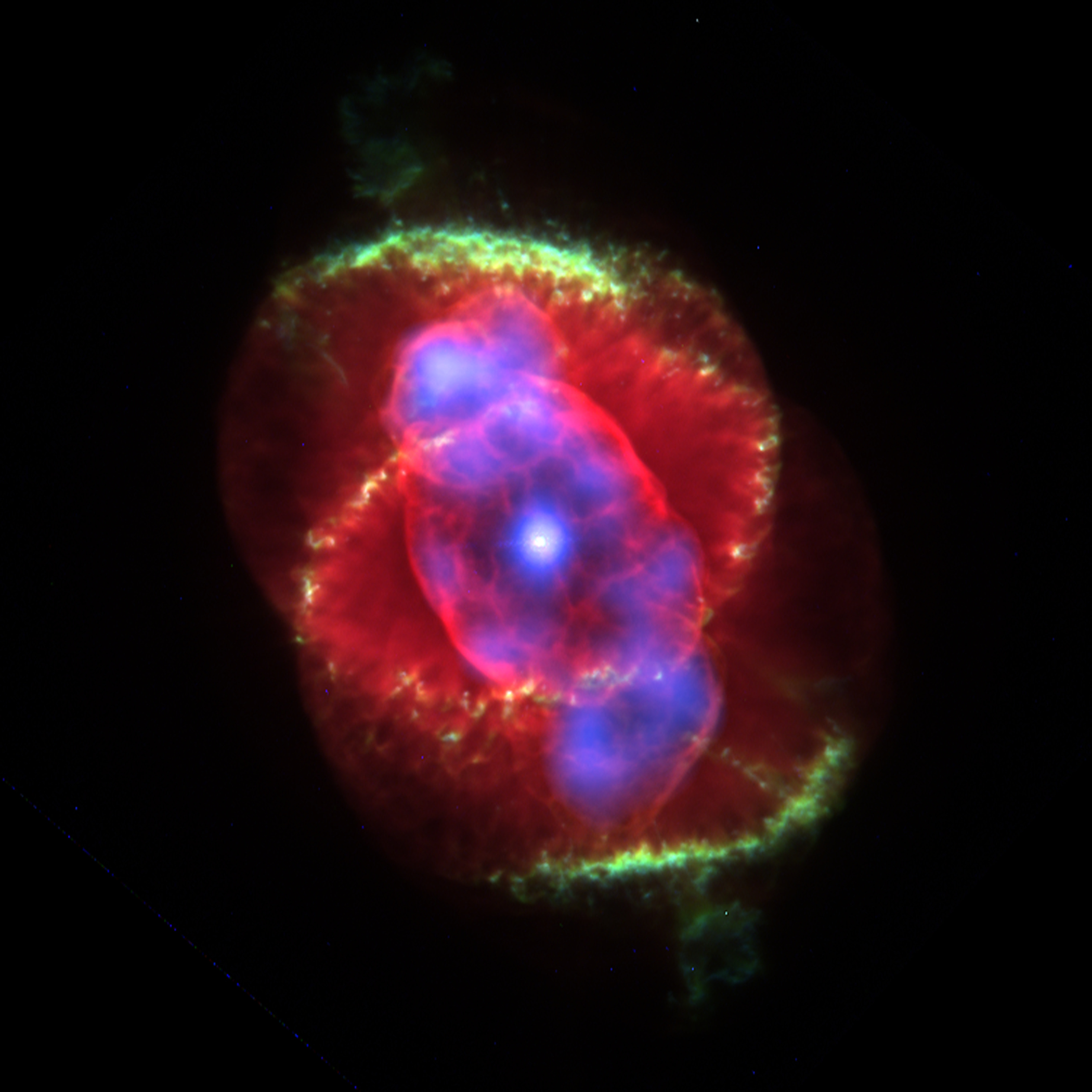
The Cat's Eye Nebula, a planetary nebula formed by the death of a star with about the same mass as the Sun

These mid-range stars ultimately reach the tip of the asymptotic-giant-branch and run out of fuel for shell burning. They are not sufficiently massive to start full-scale carbon fusion, so they contract again, going through a period of post-asymptotic-giant-branch superwind to produce a planetary nebula with an extremely hot central star. The central star then cools to a white dwarf. The expelled gas is relatively rich in heavy elements created within the star and may be particularly oxygen or carbon enriched, depending on the type of the star. The gas builds up in an expanding shell called a circumstellar envelope and cools as it moves away from the star, allowing dust particles and molecules to form. With the high infrared energy input from the central star, ideal conditions are formed in these circumstellar envelopes for maser excitation.

It is possible for thermal pulses to be produced once post-asymptotic-giant-branch evolution has begun, producing a variety of unusual and poorly understood stars known as born-again asymptotic-giant-branch stars. These may result in extreme horizontal-branch stars (subdwarf B stars), hydrogen deficient post-asymptotic-giant-branch stars, variable planetary nebula central stars, and R Coronae Borealis variables.

=== Massive stars ===
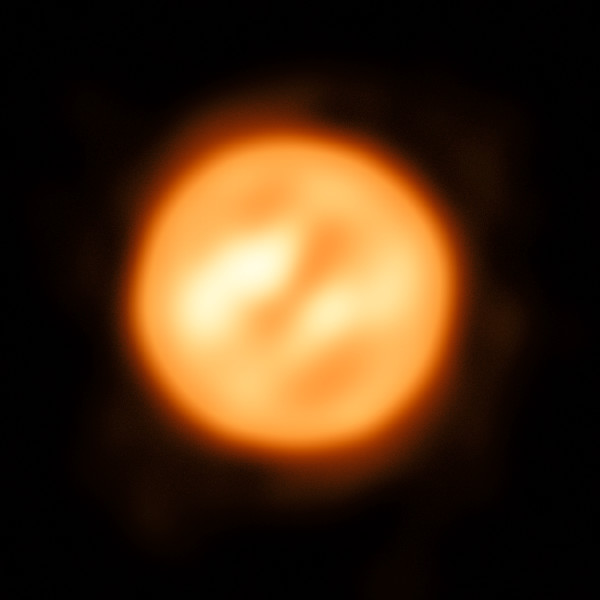
Reconstructed image of Antares, a red supergiant

In massive stars, the core is already large enough at the onset of the hydrogen burning shell that helium ignition will occur before electron degeneracy pressure has a chance to become prevalent. Thus, when these stars expand and cool, they do not brighten as dramatically as lower-mass stars; however, they were more luminous on the main sequence and they evolve to highly luminous supergiants. Their cores become massive enough that they cannot support themselves by electron degeneracy and will eventually collapse to produce a neutron star or black hole.

==== Supergiant evolution ====
Extremely massive stars (more than approximately 40 M_{☉}), which are very luminous and thus have very rapid stellar winds, lose mass so rapidly due to radiation pressure that they tend to strip off their own envelopes before they can expand to become red supergiants, and thus retain extremely high surface temperatures (and blue-white color) from their main-sequence time onwards. The largest stars of the current generation are about 100–150 M_{☉} because the outer layers would be expelled by the extreme radiation. Although lower-mass stars normally do not burn off their outer layers so rapidly, they can likewise avoid becoming red giants or red supergiants if they are in binary systems close enough so that the companion star strips off the envelope as it expands, or if they rotate rapidly enough so that convection extends all the way from the core to the surface, resulting in the absence of a separate core and envelope due to thorough mixing.

The onion-like layers of a massive, evolved star just before core collapse (not to scale)

The core of a massive star, defined as the region depleted of hydrogen, grows hotter and denser as it accretes material from the fusion of hydrogen outside the core. In sufficiently massive stars, the core reaches temperatures and densities high enough to fuse carbon and heavier elements via the alpha process. At the end of helium fusion, the core of a star consists primarily of carbon and oxygen. In stars heavier than about 8 M_{☉}, the carbon ignites and fuses to form neon, sodium, and magnesium. Stars somewhat less massive may partially ignite carbon, but they are unable to fully fuse the carbon before electron degeneracy sets in, and these stars will eventually leave an oxygen-neon-magnesium white dwarf.

The exact mass limit for full carbon burning depends on several factors such as metallicity and the detailed mass lost on the asymptotic giant branch, but is approximately 8–9 M_{☉}. After carbon burning is complete, the core of these stars reaches about 2.5 M_{☉} and becomes hot enough for heavier elements to fuse. Before oxygen starts to fuse, neon begins to capture electrons which triggers neon burning. For a range of stars of approximately 8-12 M_{☉}, this process is unstable and creates runaway fusion resulting in an electron capture supernova.

In more massive stars, the fusion of neon proceeds without a runaway deflagration. This is followed in turn by complete oxygen burning and silicon burning, producing a core consisting largely of iron-peak elements. Surrounding the core are shells of lighter elements still undergoing fusion. The timescale for complete fusion of a carbon core to an iron core is so short, just a few hundred years, that the outer layers of the star are unable to react and the appearance of the star is largely unchanged. The iron core grows until it reaches an effective Chandrasekhar mass, higher than the formal Chandrasekhar mass due to various corrections for the relativistic effects, entropy, charge, and the surrounding envelope. The effective Chandrasekhar mass for an iron core varies from about 1.34 M_{☉} in the least massive red supergiants to more than 1.8 M_{☉} in more massive stars. Once this mass is reached, electrons begin to be captured into the iron-peak nuclei and the core becomes unable to support itself. The core collapses and the star is destroyed, either in a supernova or direct collapse to a black hole.

==== Supernova ====
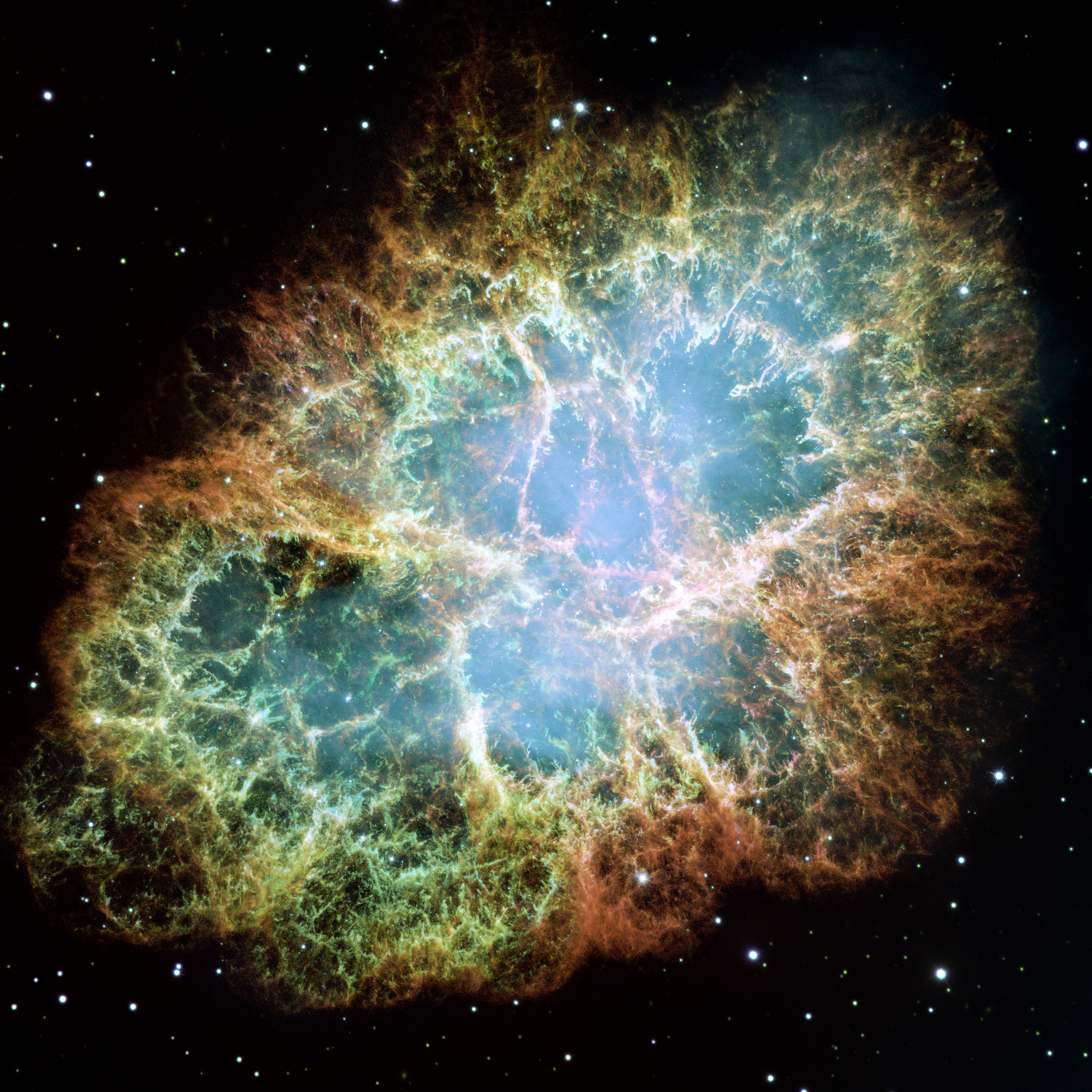
The Crab Nebula, the shattered remnants of a star which exploded as a supernova visible in 1054 AD

When the core of a massive star collapses, it will form a neutron star, or in the case of cores that exceed the Tolman–Oppenheimer–Volkoff limit, a black hole. Through a process that is not completely understood, some of the gravitational potential energy released by this core collapse is converted into a Type Ib, Type Ic, or Type II supernova. It is known that the core collapse produces a massive surge of neutrinos, as observed with supernova SN 1987A. The extremely energetic neutrinos fragment some nuclei; some of their energy is consumed in releasing nucleons, including neutrons, and some of their energy is transformed into heat and kinetic energy, thus augmenting the shock wave started by rebound of some of the infalling material from the collapse of the core. Electron capture in very dense parts of the infalling matter may produce additional neutrons. Because some of the rebounding matter is bombarded by the neutrons, some of its nuclei capture them, creating a spectrum of heavier-than-iron material including the radioactive elements up to (and likely beyond) uranium. Although non-exploding red giants can produce significant quantities of elements heavier than iron using neutrons released in side reactions of earlier nuclear reactions, the abundance of elements heavier than iron (and in particular, of certain isotopes of elements that have multiple stable or long-lived isotopes) produced in such reactions is quite different from that produced in a supernova. Neither abundance alone matches that found in the Solar System, so both supernovae, neutron star mergers and ejection of elements from red giants are required to explain the observed abundance of heavy elements and isotopes thereof.

The energy transferred from collapse of the core to rebounding material not only generates heavy elements, but provides for their acceleration well beyond escape velocity, thus causing a Type Ib, Type Ic, or Type II supernova. Current understanding of this energy transfer is still not satisfactory; although current computer models of Type Ib, Type Ic, and Type II supernovae account for part of the energy transfer, they are not able to account for enough energy transfer to produce the observed ejection of material. However, neutrino oscillations may play an important role in the energy transfer problem as they not only affect the energy available in a particular flavour of neutrinos but also through other general-relativistic effects on neutrinos.

Some evidence gained from analysis of the mass and orbital parameters of binary neutron stars (which require two such supernovae) hints that the collapse of an oxygen-neon-magnesium core may produce a supernova that differs observably (in ways other than size) from a supernova produced by the collapse of an iron core.

The most massive stars that exist today may be completely destroyed by a supernova with an energy greatly exceeding its gravitational binding energy. This rare event, caused by pair-instability, leaves behind no black hole remnant. In the past history of the universe, some stars were even larger than the largest that exists today, and they would immediately collapse into a black hole at the end of their lives, due to photodisintegration.

== Stellar remnants ==
Stellar evolution of low-mass (left cycle), mid-mass (top left cycle), and high-mass (right cycle) stars, with examples in italics

After a star has burned out its fuel supply, its remnants can take one of three forms, depending on the mass during its lifetime.

=== White and black dwarfs ===
For a star of 1 M_{☉}, the resulting white dwarf is of about 0.6 M_{☉}, compressed into approximately the volume of the Earth. White dwarfs are stable because the inward pull of gravity is balanced by the degeneracy pressure of the star's electrons, a consequence of the Pauli exclusion principle. Electron degeneracy pressure provides a rather soft limit against further compression; therefore, for a given chemical composition, white dwarfs of higher mass have a smaller volume. With no fuel left to burn, the star radiates its remaining heat into space for billions of years.

A white dwarf is very hot when it first forms, more than 100,000 K at the surface and even hotter in its interior. It is so hot that a lot of its energy is lost in the form of neutrinos for the first 10 million years of its existence and will have lost most of its energy after a billion years.

The chemical composition of the white dwarf depends upon its mass. A star that has a mass of about 8-12 solar masses will ignite carbon fusion to form magnesium, neon, and smaller amounts of other elements, resulting in a white dwarf composed chiefly of oxygen, neon, and magnesium, provided that it can lose enough mass to get below the Chandrasekhar limit (see below), and provided that the ignition of carbon is not so violent as to blow the star apart in a supernova. A star of mass on the order of magnitude of the Sun will be unable to ignite carbon fusion, and will produce a white dwarf composed chiefly of carbon and oxygen, and of mass too low to collapse unless matter is added to it later (see below). A star of less than about half the mass of the Sun will be unable to ignite helium fusion (as noted earlier), and will produce a white dwarf composed chiefly of helium.

In the end, all that remains is a cold dark mass sometimes called a black dwarf. However, the universe is not old enough for any black dwarfs to exist yet.

If the white dwarf's mass increases above the Chandrasekhar limit, which is 1.4 M_{☉} for a white dwarf composed chiefly of carbon, oxygen, neon, and/or magnesium, then electron degeneracy pressure fails due to electron capture and the star collapses. Depending upon the chemical composition and pre-collapse temperature in the center, this will lead either to collapse into a neutron star or runaway ignition of carbon and oxygen. Heavier elements favor continued core collapse, because they require a higher temperature to ignite, because electron capture onto these elements and their fusion products is easier; higher core temperatures favor runaway nuclear reaction, which halts core collapse and leads to a Type Ia supernova. These supernovae may be many times brighter than the Type II supernova marking the death of a massive star, even though the latter has the greater total energy release. This instability to collapse means that no white dwarf more massive than approximately 1.4 M_{☉} can exist (with a possible minor exception for very rapidly spinning white dwarfs, whose centrifugal force due to rotation partially counteracts the weight of their matter). Mass transfer in a binary system may cause an initially stable white dwarf to surpass the Chandrasekhar limit.

If a white dwarf forms a close binary system with another star, hydrogen from the larger companion may accrete around and onto a white dwarf until it gets hot enough to fuse in a runaway reaction at its surface, although the white dwarf remains below the Chandrasekhar limit. Such an explosion is termed a nova.

=== Neutron stars ===
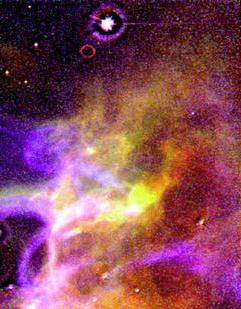
Bubble-like shock wave still expanding from a supernova explosion 15,000 years ago

Ordinarily, atoms are mostly electron clouds by volume, with very compact nuclei at the center (proportionally, if atoms were the size of a football stadium, their nuclei would be the size of dust mites). When a stellar core collapses, the pressure causes electrons and protons to fuse by electron capture. Without electrons, which keep nuclei apart, the neutrons collapse into a dense ball (in some ways like a giant atomic nucleus), with a thin overlying layer of degenerate matter (chiefly iron unless matter of different composition is added later). The neutrons resist further compression by the Pauli exclusion principle, in a way analogous to electron degeneracy pressure, but stronger.

These stars, known as neutron stars, are extremely small—on the order of radius 10 km, no bigger than the size of a large city—and are phenomenally dense. Their period of rotation shortens dramatically as the stars shrink (due to conservation of angular momentum); observed rotational periods of neutron stars range from about 1.5 milliseconds (over 600 revolutions per second) to several seconds. When these rapidly rotating stars' magnetic poles are aligned with the Earth, there is a detectable pulse of radiation each revolution. Such neutron stars are called pulsars, and were the first neutron stars to be discovered. Though electromagnetic radiation detected from pulsars is most often in the form of radio waves, pulsars have also been detected at visible, X-ray, and gamma ray wavelengths.

=== Black holes ===
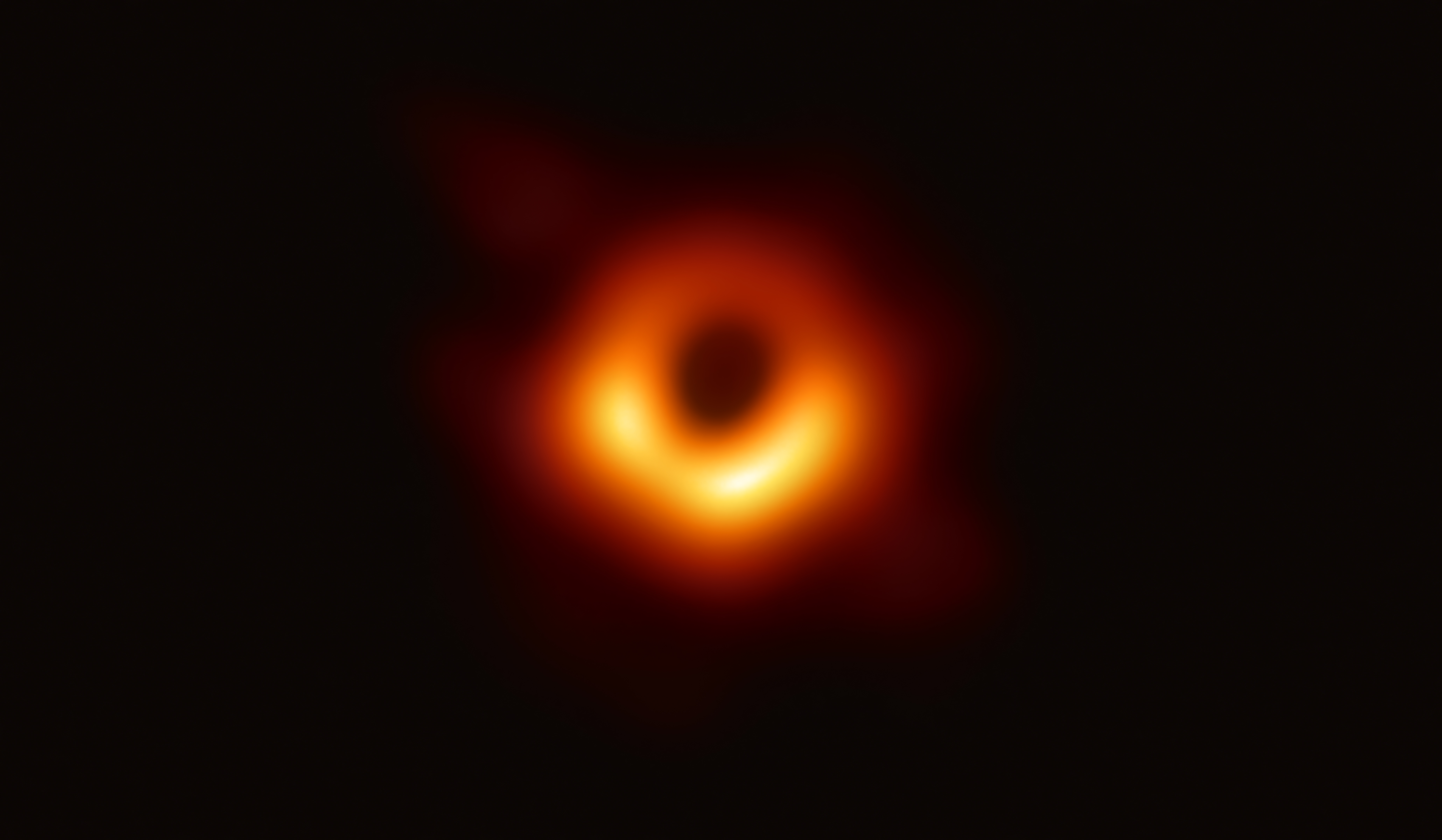
Image of the supermassive black hole in the center of Messier 87

If the mass of the stellar remnant is high enough, the neutron degeneracy pressure will be insufficient to prevent collapse below the Schwarzschild radius. The stellar remnant thus becomes a black hole. The mass at which this occurs is not known with certainty, but is currently estimated at between 2 and 3 M_{☉}.

Black holes are predicted by the theory of general relativity. According to classical general relativity, no matter or information can flow from the interior of a black hole to an outside observer, although quantum effects may allow deviations from this strict rule. The existence of black holes in the universe is well supported, both theoretically and by astronomical observation.

Because the core-collapse mechanism of a supernova is, at present, only partially understood, it is still not known whether it is possible for a star to collapse directly to a black hole without producing a visible supernova, or whether some supernovae initially form unstable neutron stars which then collapse into black holes; the exact relation between the initial mass of the star and the final remnant is also not completely certain. Resolution of these uncertainties requires the analysis of more supernovae and supernova remnants.

== Models ==
A stellar evolutionary model is a mathematical model that can be used to compute the evolutionary phases of a star from its formation until it becomes a remnant. The mass and chemical composition of the star are used as the inputs, and the luminosity and surface temperature are the only constraints. The model formulae are based upon the physical understanding of the star, usually under the assumption of hydrostatic equilibrium. Extensive computer calculations are then run to determine the changing state of the star over time, yielding a table of data that can be used to determine the evolutionary track of the star across the Hertzsprung–Russell diagram, along with other evolving properties. Accurate models can be used to estimate the current age of a star by comparing its physical properties with those of stars along a matching evolutionary track.

== See also ==
- Compact star – Classification of very high density object in astronomy
- Galaxy formation and evolution – Subfield of cosmology
- Chronology of the universe – History and future of the universe
- Nucleosynthesis – Process of creating new atomic nuclei from existing nucleons
- Standard solar model – Theoretical framework detailing the sun's structure, composition and energetics
- Stellar population – Grouping of stars by similar metallicity (metallicity)
- Stellar rotation § After formation – Angular motion of a star about its axis – Rotations slow as stars age
- Timeline of stellar astronomy
