= Extinct isotopes of superheavy elements =

Extinct isotopes of superheavy elements are isotopes of superheavy elements whose half-lives were too short to have lasted through the formation of the Solar System, and because they are not replenished by natural processes, can nowadays only be found as their decay products (from alpha decay, cluster decay or spontaneous fission) trapped within sediment and meteorite samples dating billions of years ago.

== Carbonaceous chondrite fission xenon ==
Carbonaceous chondrite fission xenon (CCF Xe), are a collection of different isotopes of xenon that were thought to have arisen from the decay of a superheavy element within the island of stability. Early studies proposed that the half life of the theoretical progenitor of CCF Xe to be on the order of 10^{8} years. A later attempt at characterization of the progenitor in 1975 by Edward Anders, a professor of chemistry at the University of Chicago, and colleague John Larimer suggested a heat of vaporization of 54 kJ/mol and a boiling point of 2500K for the element and, based on estimated accretion temperatures, they also proposed elements 111 and 115 (today named roentgenium and moscovium) as the most likely candidates assuming the element condensed in pure form.

=== Allende meteorite ===
Anders went on to study samples of the Allende meteorite, the largest carbonaceous chondrite ever found on Earth. Results of these studies suggested elements 111–115 (today roentgenium, copernicium, nihonium, flerovium, and moscovium) as the most likely candidates for the progenitor of CCF Xe. These studies also proposed that the progenitor condensed as an iron chromium sulfide. This was later called into question as iron chromium sulfide is very rare with a relative abundance of 0.4%.

=== Evidence against carbonaceous fission xenon ===
By the 1980s, CCF Xe actually being the product of fission was doubtful, and the alternate theory that it had arisen from r-process (neutron capture) nucleosynthesis gained more ground. Researchers looked at the isotopic anomalies in nearby elements samarium, neodymium, and barium, and compared to the amount of xenon. Whether CCF Xe was produced by nucleosynthesis or fission, comparable amounts of barium-135 should be produced. When researchers compared the experimental data to predicted amounts of barium following each model, neither model came close to predicting the anomalies correctly, leading to Lewis et al. calling the experiment an "embarrassment" for both models. However, in the case of nucleosynthesis, it is possible that samarium, neodymium, and barium were separated from Xe by prior condensation in the supernova shell or plasma processes. Based on this data it was deemed unlikely that CCF Xe had actually arose from fission.
