= Silicon-burning process =

Very brief sequence of nuclear fusion reactions that occur in massive stars

In astrophysics, silicon burning is a very brief sequence of nuclear fusion reactions that occur in massive stars with a minimum of about 8–11 solar masses. Silicon burning is the final stage of fusion for massive stars that have run out of the fuels that power them for their long lives in the main sequence on the Hertzsprung–Russell diagram. It follows the previous stages of hydrogen, helium, carbon, neon and oxygen burning processes. Silicon burning begins when gravitational contraction raises the star's core temperature to 2.7–3.5 billion kelvin (GK). The exact temperature depends on mass. When a star has completed the silicon-burning phase, no further fusion is possible. The star catastrophically collapses and may explode in what is known as a Type II supernova. The silicon-burning process is extremely brief: for a 25-solar mass star, the period lasts 5 days, compared to a prior 10 million years of hydrogen burning. Early stages of the silicon-burning process are theorized to occur in the accretion disk of stellar black holes, especially below 10 solar masses.

== Nuclear fusion sequence and silicon photodisintegration ==
After a star completes the oxygen-burning process, its core is composed primarily of silicon and sulfur. If it has sufficiently high mass, it further contracts until its core reaches temperatures in the range of 2.7–3.5 GK (230–300 keV). At these temperatures, silicon and other elements can photodisintegrate, emitting a proton or an alpha particle. Silicon burning proceeds by photodisintegration rearrangement, which creates new elements by the alpha process, adding one of these freed alpha particles (the equivalent of a helium nucleus) per capture step in the following sequence (photoejection of alphas not shown):

^{28}_{14}Si	+	^{4}_{2}He	→	^{32}_{16}S
^{32}_{16}S	+	^{4}_{2}He	→	^{36}_{18}Ar
^{36}_{18}Ar	+	^{4}_{2}He	→	^{40}_{20}Ca
^{40}_{20}Ca	+	^{4}_{2}He	→	^{44}_{22}Ti
^{44}_{22}Ti	+	^{4}_{2}He	→	^{48}_{24}Cr
^{48}_{24}Cr	+	^{4}_{2}He	→	^{52}_{26}Fe
^{52}_{26}Fe	+	^{4}_{2}He	→	^{56}_{28}Ni

The chain could theoretically continue, as adding further alphas continues to be exothermic all the way to tin-100. However, the steps after nickel-56 are much less exothermic and the temperature is so high that photodisintegration prevents further progress.

The silicon-burning sequence lasts about one day before being struck by the shock wave that was launched by the core collapse. Burning then becomes much more rapid at the elevated temperature and stops only when the rearrangement chain has been converted to nickel-56 or is stopped by supernova ejection and cooling. The nickel-56 decays first to cobalt-56 and then to iron-56, with half-lives of 6 and 77 days respectively, but this happens later, because only minutes are available within the core of a massive star. The star has run out of nuclear fuel and within minutes its core begins to contract.

During this phase of the contraction, the potential energy of gravitational contraction heats the interior to 5 GK (430 keV), which opposes and delays the contraction. However, since no additional heat energy can be generated via new fusion reactions, the final unopposed contraction rapidly accelerates into a collapse lasting only a few seconds. The central portion of the star is now crushed into a neutron core with the temperature soaring further to 100 GK (8.6 MeV) that quickly cools down into a neutron star if the mass of the star is below 20 M_{☉}. Between 20 M_{☉} and 40–50 M_{☉}, fallback of the material will make the neutron core collapse further into a black hole. The outer layers of the star are blown off in an explosion known as a Type II supernova that lasts days to months. The supernova explosion releases a large burst of neutrons, which may synthesize in about one second roughly half of the supply of elements in the universe that are heavier than iron, via a rapid neutron-capture sequence known as the r-process (where the "r" stands for "rapid" neutron capture).

== See also ==
- Alpha nuclide
- Alpha process
- Stellar evolution
- Supernova nucleosynthesis
- Neutron capture:
  - p-process
  - r-process
  - s-process
