= Iron peak =

Comparatively high abundance of elements with atomic numbers near iron

The iron peak is a local maximum in the vicinity of Fe (Cr, Mn, Fe, Co and Ni) on the graph of the abundances of the chemical elements in the Solar System.

For elements lighter than iron on the periodic table, nuclear fusion releases energy. For iron, and for all of the heavier elements, nuclear fusion consumes energy. Chemical elements up to the iron peak are produced in ordinary stellar nucleosynthesis, with the alpha elements being particularly abundant. Some heavier elements are produced by less efficient processes such as the r-process and s-process. Elements with atomic numbers close to iron are produced in large quantities in supernovae due to explosive oxygen and silicon fusion, followed by radioactive decay of nuclei such as Nickel-56. On average, heavier elements are less abundant in the universe, but some of those near iron are comparatively more abundant than would be expected from this trend.

Abundances of the chemical elements in the Solar System. Hydrogen and helium are most common, from the Big Bang. The next three elements (Li, Be, B) are rare because they are poorly synthesized in the Big Bang and also in stars. The two general trends in the remaining stellar-produced elements are: (1) an alternation of abundance in elements as they have even or odd atomic numbers (also known as the Oddo–Harkins rule), and (2) a general decrease in abundance, as elements become heavier. The "iron peak" may be seen in the elements near iron as a secondary effect, increasing relative abundances of elements with nuclei most strongly bound.

== Binding energy ==
Curve of binding energy

A graph of the nuclear binding energy per nucleon for all the elements shows a sharp increase to a peak near nickel and then a slow decrease to heavier elements. Increasing values of binding energy represent energy released when a collection of nuclei is rearranged into another collection for which the sum of nuclear binding energies is higher. Light elements such as hydrogen release large amounts of energy (a big increase in binding energy) when combined to form heavier nuclei. Conversely, heavy elements such as uranium release energy when converted to lighter nuclei through alpha decay and nuclear fission. ^{56}_{28}Ni is the most thermodynamically favorable in the cores of high-mass stars. Although iron-58 and nickel-62 have even higher (per nucleon) binding energy, their synthesis cannot be achieved in large quantities, because the required number of neutrons is typically not available in the stellar nuclear material, and they cannot be produced in the alpha process (their mass numbers are not multiples of 4).

== See also ==
- Abundances of the elements (data page)
