= P-process =

Processes in astrophysics

The term p-process (p for proton) is used in two ways in the scientific literature concerning the astrophysical origin of the elements (nucleosynthesis). Originally it referred to a proton capture process which was proposed to be the source of certain, naturally occurring, neutron-deficient isotopes of the elements from selenium to mercury. These nuclides are called p-nuclei and their origin is still not completely understood. Although it was shown that the originally suggested process cannot produce the p-nuclei, later on the term p-process was sometimes used to generally refer to any nucleosynthesis process supposed to be responsible for the p-nuclei.

Often, the two meanings are confused. Recent scientific literature therefore suggests to use the term p-process only for the actual proton capture process, as it is customary with other nucleosynthesis processes in astrophysics.

== The proton capture p-process ==
Proton-rich nuclides can be produced by sequentially adding one or more protons to an atomic nucleus. Such a nuclear reaction of type (p,γ) is called proton capture reaction. By adding a proton to a nucleus, the element is changed because the chemical element is defined by the proton number of a nucleus. At the same time the ratio of protons to neutrons is changed, resulting in a more neutron-deficient isotope of the next element. This led to the original idea for the production of p-nuclei: free protons (the nuclei of hydrogen atoms are present in stellar plasmas) should be captured on heavy nuclei (seed nuclei) also already present in the stellar plasma (previously produced in the s-process and/or r-process).

Such proton captures on stable nuclides (or nearly stable), however, are not very efficient in producing p-nuclei, especially the heavier ones, because the electric charge increases with each added proton, leading to an increased repulsion of the next proton to be added, according to Coulomb's law. In the context of nuclear reactions this is called a Coulomb barrier. The higher the Coulomb barrier, the more kinetic energy a proton requires to get close to a nucleus and be captured by it. The average energy of the available protons is given by the temperature of the stellar plasma. Even if this temperature could be increased arbitrarily (which is not the case in stellar environments), protons would be removed faster from a nucleus by photodisintegration than they could be captured at high temperature. A possible alternative would be to have a very large number of protons available to increase the effective number of proton captures per second without having to raise the temperature too much. Such conditions, however, are not found in core-collapse supernovae which were supposed to be the site of the p-process.

Proton captures at extremely high proton densities are called rapid proton capture processes. They are distinct from the p-process not only by the required high proton density but also by the fact that very short-lived radionuclides are involved and the reaction path is located close to the proton drip line. Rapid proton capture processes are the rp-process, the νp-process, and the pn-process.

== History ==
The term p-process was originally proposed in the famous B^{2}FH paper in 1957. The authors assumed that this process was solely responsible for the p-nuclei and proposed that it occurs in the hydrogen-shell (see also stellar evolution) of a star exploding as a type II supernova. It was shown later that the required conditions are not found in such supernovae.

At the same time as B^{2}FH, Alastair Cameron independently realized the necessity to add another nucleosynthesis process to neutron capture nucleosynthesis but simply mentioned proton captures without assigning a special name to the process. He also thought about alternatives, for example photodisintegration (called the γ-process today) or a combination of p-process and photodisintegration.

== See also ==
- p-nuclei
- Nucleosynthesis
- rp-process
- r-process
- s-process
