= Neon-burning process =

Set of nuclear fusion reactions

The neon-burning process is a set of nuclear fusion reactions that take place in evolved massive stars with at least 8 Solar masses. Neon burning requires high temperatures and densities (around 1.2 billion K or 100 keV and 4 billion kg/m^{3}).

== Process ==
=== Formulae ===
At such high temperatures photodisintegration becomes a significant effect, so some neon nuclei decompose, absorbing 4.73 MeV and releasing alpha particles. This free helium nucleus can then fuse with neon to produce magnesium, releasing 9.316 MeV.

^{20}_{10}Ne	+	γ	→	^{16}_{8}O	+	^{4}_{2}He
^{20}_{10}Ne	+	^{4}_{2}He	→	^{24}_{12}Mg	+	γ

Alternatively:

^{20}_{10}Ne	+	n	→	^{21}_{10}Ne	+	γ
^{21}_{10}Ne	+	^{4}_{2}He	→	^{24}_{12}Mg	+	n

where the neutron consumed in the first step is regenerated in the second.

A secondary reaction causes helium to fuse with magnesium to produce silicon:

^{24}_{12}Mg + ^{4}_{2}He → ^{28}_{14}Si + γ

Contraction of the core leads to an increase of temperature, allowing neon to fuse directly as follows:

^{20}_{10}Ne + ^{20}_{10}Ne → ^{16}_{8}O + ^{24}_{12}Mg

=== Description ===
Neon burning takes place after carbon burning has consumed all carbon in the core and built up a new oxygen–neon–sodium–magnesium core. The core ceases producing fusion energy and contracts. This contraction increases density and temperature up to the ignition point of neon burning. The increased temperature around the core allows carbon to burn in a shell, and there will be shells burning helium and hydrogen outside.

During neon burning, oxygen and magnesium accumulate in the central core while neon is consumed. After a few years the star consumes all its neon and the core ceases producing fusion energy and contracts. Again, gravitational pressure takes over and compresses the central core, increasing its density and temperature until the oxygen-burning process can start.
