= Oxygen-burning process =

Set of nuclear fusion reactions

The oxygen-burning process is a set of nuclear fusion reactions that take place in massive stars that have used up the lighter elements in their cores. Oxygen-burning is preceded by the neon-burning process and succeeded by the silicon-burning process. As the neon-burning process ends, the core of the star contracts and heats until it reaches the ignition temperature for oxygen burning. Oxygen burning reactions are similar to those of carbon burning; however, they must occur at higher temperatures and densities due to the larger Coulomb barrier of oxygen.

== Reactions ==
Oxygen ignites in the temperature range of (1.5–2.6)×10^{9} K and in the density range of (2.6–6.7)×10^{12} kg·m^{−3}. The principal reactions are given below, where the branching ratios assume that the deuteron channel is open (at high temperatures):

^{16}_{8}O	+	^{16}_{8}O	→	^{28}_{14}Si	+	^{4}_{2}He	+	9.593 MeV (34%)
			→	^{31}_{15}P	+	^{1}_{1}H	+	7.676 MeV (56%)
			→	^{31}_{16}S	+	n	+	1.459 MeV (5%)
			→	^{30}_{14}Si	+	2 ^{1}_{1}H	+	0.381 MeV
			→	^{30}_{15}P	+	^{2}_{1}D	−	2.409 MeV (5%)
Alternatively:
			→	^{32}_{16}S	+	γ	+	16.539 MeV
			→	^{24}_{12}Mg	+	2 ^{4}_{2}He	−	0.393 MeV

Near 2×10^{9} K, the oxygen-burning reaction rate is approximately 2.8×10^{−12}(T_{9}/2)^{33}, where T_{9} is the temperature in billion kelvins. Overall, the major products of the oxygen-burning process are ^{28}Si, ^{32,33,34}S, ^{35,37}Cl, ^{36,38}Ar, ^{39,41}K, and ^{40,42}Ca. Of these, ^{28}Si and ^{32}S constitute 90% of the final composition. The oxygen fuel within the core of the star is exhausted after 0.01–5 years, depending on the star's mass and other parameters. The silicon-burning process, which follows, creates iron, but this iron cannot react further to create energy to support the star.

During the oxygen-burning process, proceeding outward, there is an oxygen-burning shell, followed by a neon shell, a carbon shell, a helium shell, and a hydrogen shell. The oxygen-burning process is the last nuclear reaction in the star's core which does not proceed via the alpha process.

== Pre-oxygen burning ==
Although ^{16}O is lighter than neon, neon burning occurs before oxygen burning, because ^{16}O is a doubly-magic nucleus and hence extremely stable. Compared to oxygen, neon is much less stable. As a result, neon burning occurs at lower temperatures than ^{16}O + ^{16}O. During neon burning, oxygen and magnesium accumulate in the core of the star. At the onset of oxygen burning, oxygen in the stellar core is plentiful due to the helium-burning process (^{4}He(2α,γ)^{12}C(α,γ)^{16}O), carbon-burning process (^{12}C(^{12}C,α)^{20}Ne, ^{12}C(α,γ)^{16}O), and neon-burning process (^{20}Ne(γ,α)^{16}O). The reaction ^{12}C(α,γ)^{16}O has a significant effect on the reaction rates during oxygen burning, as it produces large quantities of ^{16}O.

== Convectively bounded flames and off-center oxygen ignition ==
For stars with masses greater than 10.3 solar masses, oxygen ignites in the core or not at all. Similarly, for stars with a mass of less than 9 solar masses (without accretion of additional mass) oxygen ignites in the core or not at all. However, in the 9–10.3 solar mass range, oxygen ignites off-center.

For stars in this mass range neon-burning occurs in a convective envelope rather than at the core of the star. For the particular example of a 9.5 solar mass star, the neon-burning process takes place in an envelope of approximately 0.252 solar masses (~1560 kilometers) off center. From the ignition flash, the neon convective zone extends further out to 1.1 solar masses with a peak power around 10^{36} W. After only a month, the power declines to about 10^{35} W and stays at this rate for about 10 years. After this phase, the neon in the shell is depleted, resulting in greater inward pressure on the star. This raises the shell's temperature to 1.65 billion kelvins. This results in a neon-burning, convectively-bound flame front that moves toward the core. The motion of the flame is what eventually leads to oxygen-burning. In approximately 3 years, the flame's temperature reaches about 1.83 billion kelvins, enabling the oxygen-burning process to commence. This occurs around 9.5 years before the iron core develops. Similarly to the beginning of neon-burning, off-center oxygen-burning commences with another flash. The convectively burning flame then results from both neon and oxygen burning as it advances towards the core, while the oxygen-burning shell continuously shrinks in mass.

== Neutrino losses ==
During the oxygen-burning process, energy loss due to neutrino emission becomes relevant. Due to the large energy loss, oxygen must burn at temperatures higher than a billion kelvins in order to maintain a radiation pressure strong enough to support the star against gravity. Further, two electron capture reactions (which produce neutrinos) become significant when the matter density is high enough (ρ > 2×10^{7} g/cm^{3}). Due to these factors, the timescale of oxygen burning is much shorter for heavy, dense stars.

== Explosive oxygen burning ==
The oxygen-burning process can occur under hydrostatic and under explosive conditions. The products of explosive oxygen burning are similar to those in hydrostatic oxygen burning. However, stable oxygen burning is accompanied by a multitude of electron captures, while explosive oxygen burning is accompanied by a significantly greater presence of photodisintegration reactions. In the temperature range of (3–4)×10^{9} K, photodisintegration and oxygen fusion occur with comparable reaction rates.

== Pair-instability supernovae ==
Very massive (140–260 solar masses) population III stars may become unstable during core oxygen burning due to pair production. This results in a thermonuclear explosion, which completely disrupts the star.
