= Photodisintegration =

Disintegration of atomic nuclei from high-energy EM radiation

Photodisintegration (also called phototransmutation, or a photonuclear reaction) is a nuclear process in which an atomic nucleus absorbs a high-energy gamma ray, enters an excited state, and immediately decays by emitting a subatomic particle. It therefore decreases the mass number of the affected nucleus. The reactions are called (γ,n), (γ,p), and (γ,α), respectively. It is generally endothermic (absorbs energy) if performed on elements lighter than iron, and exothermic (releases energy) if performed on elements heavier than iron. In an endothermic reaction, the resulting nuclei has a higher total mass, according to the mass-energy relation, and vice versa in an exothermic reaction.

In γ-process, a form of p-process nucleosynthesis, photodisintegration acts on pre-existing seed nuclei (usually heavier than iron) and converts them into lighter, neutron-deficient, proton-rich isotopes, through sequences of (γ,n), (γ,p), and (γ,α) reactions. These reactions shift material toward lighter, neutron-deficient, proton-rich isotopes. The γ-process is thought to contribute to the production of stable p-nuclei, especially in supernovae.

In some hypernovae, endothermic photodisintegration can convert so much radiation energy into mass-energy that it causes the star to collapse.

== Photodisintegration of deuterium ==
A photon carrying 2.22 MeV or more energy can photodisintegrate an atom of deuterium:

^{2}_{1}D	+	γ	→	^{1}_{1}H	+	n

The photodisintegration of deuterium releases a proton and a free neutron.

James Chadwick and Maurice Goldhaber used this reaction to measure the proton-neutron mass difference. Since the measured mass of a neutron (1.0087 Da) was greater than the mass of a hydrogen atom (1.0078 Da), a mass which would further decrease by the energy difference of the two bound states, this experiment proves that a neutron is not a bound state of a proton and an electron, as had been proposed by Ernest Rutherford.

== Photodisintegration of beryllium ==
A photon carrying 1.67 MeV or more energy can photodisintegrate an atom of beryllium-9 (100% of natural beryllium, its only stable isotope):

^{9}_{4}Be	+	γ	→	2	^{4}_{2}He	+	n

Antimony-124 is assembled with beryllium to make laboratory neutron sources and startup neutron sources. Antimony-124 (half-life 60.20 days) emits β− and 1.690 MeV gamma rays (also 0.602 MeV and 9 fainter emissions from 0.645 to 2.090 MeV), yielding stable tellurium-124. Gamma rays from antimony-124 split beryllium-9 into two alpha particles and a neutron with an average kinetic energy of 24 keV (a so-called intermediate neutron in terms of energy):

^{124}_{51}Sb	→	^{124}_{52}Te	+	β^{−}	+	γ

Other isotopes have higher thresholds for photoneutron production, as high as 18.72 MeV, for carbon-12.

== Hypernovae ==
In explosions of very large stars (250 or more solar masses), photodisintegration is a major factor in the supernova event. As the star reaches the end of its life, it reaches temperatures and pressures where photodisintegration's energy-absorbing effects temporarily reduce pressure and temperature within the star's core. This causes the core to start to collapse as energy is taken away by photodisintegration, and the collapsing core leads to the formation of a black hole. A portion of mass escapes in the form of relativistic jets, which could have "sprayed" the first metals into the universe.

== Photodisintegration in lightning ==
Terrestrial lightning produces high-speed electrons that create bursts of gamma-rays as bremsstrahlung. The energy of these rays is sometimes sufficient to start photonuclear reactions resulting in emitted neutrons. One such reaction, ^{14}_{7}N(γ,n)^{13}_{7}N, is the only natural process other than those induced by cosmic rays in which ^{13}_{7}N is produced on Earth. The unstable isotopes remaining from the reaction may subsequently emit positrons by β^{+} decay.

== Photofission ==
Photofission is a similar but distinct process, in which a nucleus, after absorbing a gamma ray, undergoes nuclear fission (splits into two fragments of nearly equal mass).

== See also ==
- Pair-instability supernova
- Silicon-burning process
