= Hendrik Schatz =

German physicist

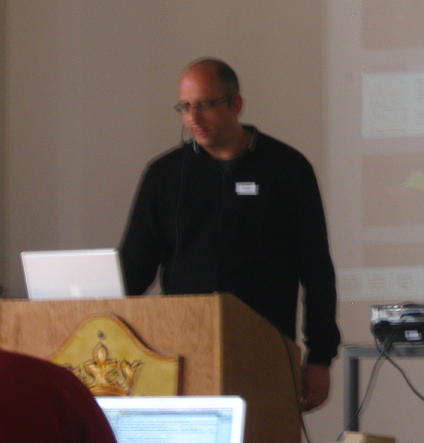
- Hendrik lecturing, 2011
- Education: University of Heidelberg
- Known for: X-ray Bursts
- Awards: APS Fellow (2007), College of Natural Science Teacher-Scholar Award (2002), Alfred P/ Sloan Fellow (2001)
- Scientific career
- Fields: Nuclear astrophysics, Experimental Physics
- Workplaces: Michigan State University, National Superconducting Cyclotron Laboratory
- Doctoral advisor: H. Rebel & M. Wiescher

Hendrik Schatz is a professor of Nuclear Astrophysics at Michigan State University. He earned his Diploma from the University of Karlsruhe in 1993, and his PhD from the University of Heidelberg in 1997 after completing his thesis work at the University of Notre Dame. He is one of the Principal Investigators for the Joint Institute for Nuclear Astrophysics and is a leading expert on nuclear astrophysics,. Schatz also serves the science advisory committees for the Facility for Rare Isotope Beams and GSI. Hendrik's primary field of expertise is Type I X-ray Bursts. His most notable contribution to this field is the discovery of the SnTeSb-cycle. Hendrik was featured in Science magazine November 22, 2002 for his work on experimental nuclear astrophysics. Hendrik has also contributed to Physics Today.

His APS Fellowship citation is:

For his seminal contributions to our theoretical and experimental understanding of the r-process, the rp process, x-ray bursts, and the modification of neutron star crusts by the ashes of nuclear processes.
