= Scott Pratt =

American physicist

Scott Edward Pratt
- Born: 1958 (age 67–68)
- Education: 1980: B.A., University of Kansas; 1985: Ph.D., University of Minnesota
- Awards: Fellow, American Physical Society; Physics and Astronomy Department Tenured Faculty Teaching Award; Osgood Teaching Award for Undergraduate Instruction; Professor Emeritum, Department of Physics & Astronomy
- Scientific career
- Fields: Theoretical description and interpretation of relativistic heavy ion collisions
- Workplaces: University of Tennessee; Oregon State University; Lund University; Niels Bohr Institute; University of Wisconsin–Madison; National Superconducting Cyclotron Laboratory at Michigan State University
- Thesis: Pion Pictures of Heavy Ion Collisions

Scott Edward Pratt (born 1958) is an American theoretical physicist at the cyclotron laboratory of Michigan State University, known for his studies on pion interferometry and heavy ion collisions.

== Early life and education ==
The son of Edward and Patricia Pratt, Scott Pratt received his 1976 high school diploma at Shawnee Mission West High School in Overland Park, Kansas.

After completing a Bachelor of Science degree in physics at the University of Kansas in 1980, Pratt earned a doctorate in theoretical nuclear physics at the University of Minnesota. He completed his Ph.D. in 1985, with his dissertation, Pion Pictures of Heavy Ion Collisions, advised by Joseph Irving Kapusta.

== Career ==
Following his doctorate, from 1986–1988 Prat held research associate positions at five institutions: Texas A&M, University of Tennessee, Oregon State University, Lund University in Sweden, and the Niels Bohr Institute in Copenhagen.

From 1989 to 1992, he was a lecturer/assistant scientist at University of Wisconsin, followed by a position from 1992–1994 as a visiting assistant professor at Michigan State University's National Superconducting Cyclotron Laboratory. He then became a research assistant professor at Wayne State University, until February 1995. Since then, as a professor of physics, he has held a joint appointment as a theoretical nuclear physics faculty member of the National Superconducting Cyclotron Laboratory, and also as director of graduate studies and associate chair of the Department of Physics and Astronomy at Michigan State University.

Prat has described his research:

Modeling heavy ion collisions invoke tools and methods from numerous disciplines: quantum transport theory, relativisitic hydrodynamics, non-perturbative statistical mechanics, and traditional nuclear physics — to name a few. I have been particularly involved in the development of femtoscopic techniques built on the phenomenology of two-particle correlations. After their last randomizing collision, a pair of particles will interact according to the well-understood quantum two-body interaction. This results in a measurable correlation which can be extracted as a function of the pair's center of mass momentum and relative momentum. Since the correlation is sensitive to how far apart the particles are emitted in time and space, it can be used to quantitatively infer crucial properties of the space-time nature of the collision.

— Scott Pratt

== Selected publications ==
- Schlichting, Sören; Pratt, Scott (January 31, 2011). "Charge conservation at energies available at the BNL Relativistic Heavy Ion Collider and contributions to local parity violation observables". Physical Review C. 83 (1) 014913. American Physical Society. arXiv:1009.4283. Bibcode:2011PhRvC..83a4913S. doi:10.1103/PhysRevC.83.014913.
- Pratt, Scott; Torrieri, Giorgio (October 12, 2010). "Coupling relativistic viscous hydrodynamics to Boltzmann descriptions". Physical Review C. 82 (4) 044901. American Physical Society. arXiv:1003.0413. Bibcode:2010PhRvC..82d4901P. doi:10.1103/PhysRevC.82.044901.
- Novak, J.; Novak, K.; Pratt, S.; Vredevoogd, J.; Coleman-Smith, C. E.; Wolpert, R. L. (March 31, 2014). "Determining fundamental properties of matter created in ultrarelativistic heavy-ion collisions". Physical Review C. 89 (3) 034917. American Physical Society. arXiv:1303.5769. Bibcode:2014PhRvC..89c4917N. doi:10.1103/PhysRevC.89.034917.
- Pratt, Scott; Schlichting, Sören; Gavin, Sean (August 19, 2011). "Effects of momentum conservation and flow on angular correlations observed in experiments at the BNL Relativistic Heavy Ion Collider". Physical Review C. 84 (2) 024909. American Physical Society. arXiv:1011.6053. Bibcode:2011PhRvC..84b4909P. doi:10.1103/PhysRevC.84.024909.
- Pratt, Scott (January 11, 2012). "General charge balance functions: A tool for studying the chemical evolution of the quark-gluon plasma". Physical Review C. 85 (1) 014904. arXiv:1109.3647. Bibcode:2012PhRvC..85a4904P. doi:10.1103/physrevc.85.014904. ISSN 0556-2813.
- Pratt, Scott (May 24, 2012). "Identifying the Charge Carriers of the Quark-Gluon Plasma". Physical Review Letters. 108 (21) 212301. American Physical Society. arXiv:1203.4578. Bibcode:2012PhRvL.108u2301P. doi:10.1103/PhysRevLett.108.212301. PMID 23003245.
- Vredevoogd, J.; Pratt, S. (2009). "Universal Flow in the First fm/c at RHIC". Nucl. Phys. A. 830 (515C): 515. arXiv:0907.4733. Bibcode:2009NuPhA.830..515V. doi:10.1016/j.nuclphysa.2009.10.140 – via Proceedings of Quark Matter 2009.

== Awards, recognition ==
- Fellow of the American Physical Society in 2011, "For seminal contributions to the theory of pion interferometry and the phenomenology of heavy ion collisions."
- Physics and Astronomy Department Tenured Faculty Teaching Award, 2009
- Osgood Teaching Award for Undergraduate Instruction, 1998
- Professor Emeritum, Department of Physics & Astronomy
