= Michael C. F. Wiescher =

Nuclear physicist and astrophysicist (born 1949)

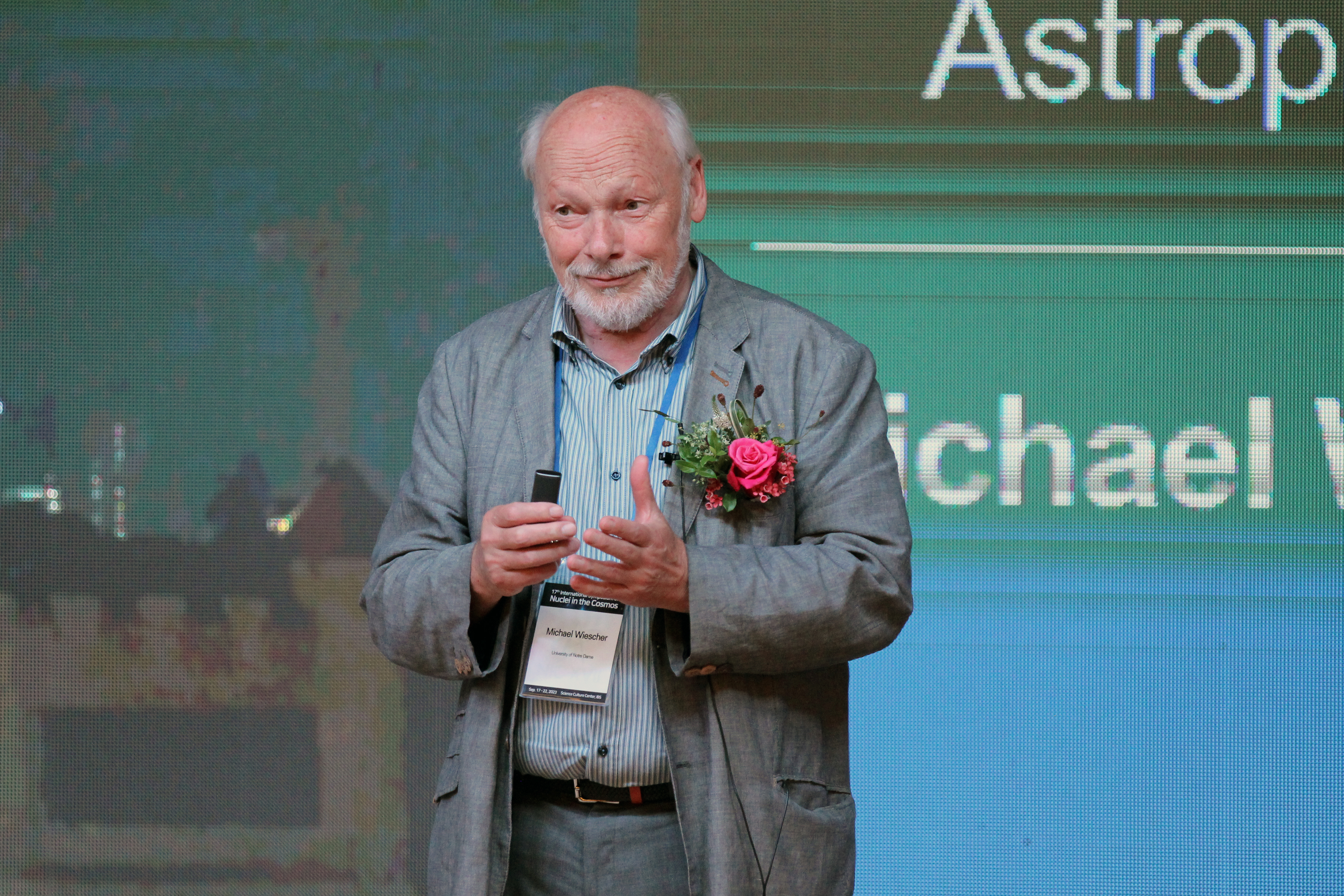
- Born: 1949 (age 76–77)
- Education: University of Münster
- Scientific career
- Fields: Nuclear physics
- Workplaces: University of Notre Dame

Michael C. F. Wiescher (born 1949 in Wuppertal) is a German-American experimental nuclear physicist and astrophysicist, known for his laboratory research in nuclear physics connected with various astrophysical phenomena such as stellar evolution and explosion environments.

== Education and career ==
Wiescher completed in 1969 his Abitur at Gymnasium Münchberg in Bavaria. At the University of Münster, he graduated in 1972 with Vordiplom in physics, in 1975 with Diplom in solid state physics, and in 1980 with doctorate (summa cum laude) in nuclear physics. His doctoral dissertation entitled Measurement of the Reactions in the CNO Cycles was supervised by Claus Rolfs. As a post-doc Wiescher was from 1980 to 1983 at the Ohio State University, from 1983 to 1985 under the supervision of Karl-Ludwig Kratz at the University of Mainz, and from 1985 to 1986 at Caltech's Kellogg Radiation Laboratory. At the University of Notre Dame he was from 1986 to 1990 an assistant professor, from 1990 to 1993, and from 1993 to 1998 a full professor, before his appointment as Freimann Professor of Physics in 1998. In addition to his Freimann Professorship, he was the director of the Joint Institute for Nuclear Astrophysics (JINA) at the University of Notre Dame from 2003-2015 and continued to be director of the Institute for Structure and Nuclear Astrophysics at Notre Dame until 2022, the Michigan State University and the University of Chicago. He is also an adjunct professor at Michigan State University and the University of Surrey. He has served as an editorial board member for Physical Review C and as an associate editor for Nuclear Physics A.

He has done research in nuclear astrophysics, low-energy experimental physics, reaction physics with stable and radioactive beams, and analysis of cultural heritage artifacts.

Wiescher is the author or co-author of over 550 research publications. He is the author of local historical writings about his birthplace Wuppertal, a biography of Arthur E. Haas, and the textbook Radioaktivität Ursprung und Auswirkungen eines Naturphänomens. Band I'' (in German), as well as the co-author, with Khachatur Manukyan, of the textbook Scientific Analysis of Cultural Heritage Objects.

He has given over 200 presentations at national and international conferences. At the 2021 Fall Meeting of the APS Division of Nuclear Physics, he presented research, done with Khachatur Manukyan, using X-rays, electron microscopy, and accelerators to investigate coins and paper money from three different historical periods.

Wiescher was elected in 1998 a fellow of the American Physical Society (APS), in 2009 a fellow of the American Association for the Advancement of Science, and in 2017 a foreign member of Academia Europaea. He received in 2003 the Hans A. Bethe Prize of the APS, in 2007 the Humboldt Prize of the Alexander von Humboldt Foundation, and in 2018 the LAD Laboratory Astrophysics Prize of the American Astronomical Society. Wiescher was the visiting Heraeus Professor in Frankfurt in 2018-2020 and a Wolfson Fellow of the Royal Society at the University of Edinburgh from 2021 to 2024.

His doctoral students include Hendrik Schatz.

== Selected publications ==
- Wiescher, M.; Gorres, J.; Thielemann, F. -K. (1986). "Explosive hydrogen burning in novae". Astronomy and Astrophysics. 160: 56–72. Bibcode:1986A&A...160...56W.
- Champagne, A. E.; Wiescher, M. (1992). "Explosive Hydrogen Burning". Annual Review of Nuclear and Particle Science. 42 (42): 39–76. Bibcode:1992ARNPS..42...39C. doi:10.1146/annurev.ns.42.120192.000351.
- Thielemann, Friedrich-Karl; Kratz, Karl-Ludwig; Pfeiffer, Bernd; Rauscher, Thomas; Van Wormer, Laura; Wiescher, Michael C. (1994). "Astrophysics and nuclei far from stabilitys". Nuclear Physics A. 570 (1–2): 329–343. Bibcode:1994NuPhA.570..329T. doi:10.1016/0375-9474(94)90299-2.
- Schatz, H.; Aprahamian, A.; Görres, J.; Wiescher, M.; Rauscher, T.; Rembges, J.F.; Thielemann, F.-K.; Pfeiffer, B.; Möller, P.; Kratz, K.-L.; Herndl, H.; Brown, B.A.; Rebel, H. (1998). "rp-Process nucleosynthesis at extreme temperature and density conditions". Physics Reports. 294 (4): 167–263. Bibcode:1998PhR...294..167S. doi:10.1016/S0370-1573(97)00048-3. (over 800 citations)
- Schatz, H.; Aprahamian, A.; Barnard, V.; Bildsten, L.; Cumming, A.; Ouellette, M.; Rauscher, T.; Thielemann, F.-K.; Wiescher, M. (2001). "End Point of the rp Process on Accreting Neutron Stars". Physical Review Letters. 86 (16): 3471–3474. arXiv:astro-ph/0102418. Bibcode:2001PhRvL..86.3471S. doi:10.1103/PhysRevLett.86.3471. PMID 11328001. S2CID 46148449. 2001
- Aprahamian, A.; Langanke, K.; Wiescher, M. (2005). "Nuclear structure aspects in nuclear astrophysics". Progress in Particle and Nuclear Physics. 54 (2): 535–613. Bibcode:2005PrPNP..54..535A. doi:10.1016/j.ppnp.2004.09.002.
- Wiescher, M. (2005). "Experimental Challenges in Nuclear Astrophysics". Nuclear Physics A. 751: 285–300. Bibcode:2005NuPhA.751..285W. doi:10.1016/j.nuclphysa.2005.02.110.
- Abbondanno, U.; et al. (2005). "Neutron capture cross section measurements for nuclear astrophysics at CERN n_TOF". Nuclear Physics A. 758: 501–504. doi:10.1016/j.nuclphysa.2005.05.180. hdl:10316/4422.
- Cyburt, Richard H.; Amthor, A. Matthew; Ferguson, Ryan; Meisel, Zach; Smith, Karl; Warren, Scott; Heger, Alexander; Hoffman, R. D.; Rauscher, Thomas; Sakharuk, Alexander; Schatz, Hendrik; Thielemann, F. K.; Wiescher, Michael (2010). "The JINA REACLIB Database: Its Recent Updates and Impact on Type-I X-Ray Bursts". The Astrophysical Journal Supplement Series. 189 (1): 240–252. Bibcode:2010ApJS..189..240C. doi:10.1088/0067-0049/189/1/240. hdl:2299/11648. S2CID 18958661. (over 750 citations)
- Pignatari, M.; Gallino, R.; Heil, M.; Wiescher, M.; Käppeler, F.; Herwig, F.; Bisterzo, S. (2010). "The weak s-process in massive stars and its dependence on the neutron capture cross sections". The Astrophysical Journal. 710 (2): 1557–1577. Bibcode:2010ApJ...710.1557P. doi:10.1088/0004-637X/710/2/1557. S2CID 120430353.
- Azuma, R. E.; Uberseder, E.; Simpson, E. C.; Brune, C. R.; Costantini, H.; De Boer, R. J.; Görres, J.; Heil, M.; Leblanc, P. J.; Ugalde, C.; Wiescher, M. (2010). "AZURE: An R-matrix code for nuclear astrophysics". Physical Review C. 81 (4) 045805. Bibcode:2010PhRvC..81d5805A. doi:10.1103/PhysRevC.81.045805.
- Schumann, D.; Neuhausen, J.; Dillmann, I.; Domingo Pardo, C.; Käppeler, F.; Marganiec, J.; Voss, F.; Walter, S.; Heil, M.; Reifarth, R.; Goerres, J.; Uberseder, E.; Wiescher, M.; Pignatari, M. (2010). "Preparation of a ^{60}Fe target for nuclear astrophysics experiments". Nuclear Instruments and Methods in Physics Research Section A: Accelerators, Spectrometers, Detectors and Associated Equipment. 613 (3): 347–350. Bibcode:2010NIMPA.613..347S. doi:10.1016/j.nima.2009.09.072.
- Adelberger, E. G.; et al. (2011). "Solar fusion cross sections. II. The pp chain and CNO cycles". Reviews of Modern Physics. 83 (1): 195–245. arXiv:1004.2318. Bibcode:2011RvMP...83..195A. doi:10.1103/RevModPhys.83.195. S2CID 119117147. (over 800 citations)
- Beard, M.; Frauendorf, S.; Kämpfer, B.; Schwengner, R.; Wiescher, M.; Yakovlev, D. G. (2012). "Photonuclear and radiative-capture reaction rates for nuclear astrophysics and transmutation: 92–100Mo,88Sr,90Zr, and139La". Physical Review C. 85 (6) 065808. arXiv:1002.0741. Bibcode:2012PhRvC..85f5808B. doi:10.1103/PhysRevC.85.065808. S2CID 125355827.
- Kontos, Antonios; Schürmann, Daniel; Akers, Charles; Couder, Manoel; Görres, Joachim; Robertson, Daniel; Stech, Ed; Talwar, Rashi; Wiescher, Michael (2012). "HIPPO: A supersonic helium jet gas target for nuclear astrophysics". Nuclear Instruments and Methods in Physics Research Section A: Accelerators, Spectrometers, Detectors and Associated Equipment. 664 (1): 272–281. Bibcode:2012NIMPA.664..272K. doi:10.1016/j.nima.2011.10.039.
- Wiescher, M.; Käppeler, F.; Langanke, K. (2012). "Critical Reactions in Contemporary Nuclear Astrophysics". Annual Review of Astronomy and Astrophysics. 50: 165–210. Bibcode:2012ARA&A..50..165W. doi:10.1146/annurev-astro-081811-125543.
- Bennett, M. E.; Hirschi, R.; Pignatari, M.; Diehl, S.; Fryer, C.; Herwig, F.; Hungerford, A.; Nomoto, K.; Rockefeller, G.; Timmes, F. X.; Wiescher, M. (2012). "The effect of ^{12}C +^{12}C rate uncertainties on the evolution and nucleosynthesis of massive stars". Monthly Notices of the Royal Astronomical Society. 420 (4): 3047–3070. arXiv:1201.1225. Bibcode:2012MNRAS.420.3047B. doi:10.1111/j.1365-2966.2012.20193.x. S2CID 119214904.
- Best, Andreas; Görres, Joachim; Junker, Matthias; Kratz, Karl-Ludwig; Laubenstein, Matthias; Long, Alexander; Nisi, Stefano; Smith, Karl; Wiescher, Michael (2016). "Low energy neutron background in deep underground laboratories". Nuclear Instruments and Methods in Physics Research Section A: Accelerators, Spectrometers, Detectors and Associated Equipment. 812: 1–6. arXiv:1509.00770. Bibcode:2016NIMPA.812....1B. doi:10.1016/j.nima.2015.12.034. S2CID 59386536.
- Arcones, Almudena; et al. (2017). "White paper on nuclear astrophysics and low energy nuclear physics Part 1: Nuclear astrophysics". Progress in Particle and Nuclear Physics. 94: 1–67. arXiv:1603.02213. Bibcode:2017PrPNP..94....1A. doi:10.1016/j.ppnp.2016.12.003. S2CID 124404243.
- Mora-Lopez, José L., ed. (2009). "Nuclear synthesis in nature by L. Langake and M. Wiescher". Fundamentals of Physics — Volume III. Encyclopedia of Life Support Systems. Eolss Publishers. pp. 202–216. ISBN 978-1-84826-223-2; e-book sample chapter
- Tan, W. P.; Boeltzig, A.; Dulal, C.; Deboer, R. J.; Frentz, B.; Henderson, S.; Howard, K. B.; Kelmar, R.; Kolata, J. J.; Long, J.; Macon, K. T.; Moylan, S.; Peaslee, G. F.; Renaud, M.; Seymour, C.; Seymour, G.; Vande Kolk, B.; Wiescher, M.; Aguilera, E. F.; Amador-Valenzuela, P.; Lizcano, D.; Martinez-Quiroz, E. (2020). "New Measurement of ^{12}C + ^{12}C Fusion Reaction at Astrophysical Energies". Physical Review Letters. 124 (19) 192702. arXiv:2005.03196. Bibcode:2020PhRvL.124s2702T. doi:10.1103/PhysRevLett.124.192702. PMID 32469557. S2CID 218537909.
- Cowan, John J.; Sneden, Christopher; Lawler, James E.; Aprahamian, Ani; Wiescher, Michael; Langanke, Karlheinz; Martínez-Pinedo, Gabriel; Thielemann, Friedrich-Karl (2021). "Origin of the heaviest elements: The rapid neutron-capture process". Reviews of Modern Physics. 93 (1) 015002. arXiv:1901.01410. Bibcode:2021RvMP...93a5002C. doi:10.1103/RevModPhys.93.015002. S2CID 216144673.
