= Nuclear drip line =

Atomic nuclei decay delimiter

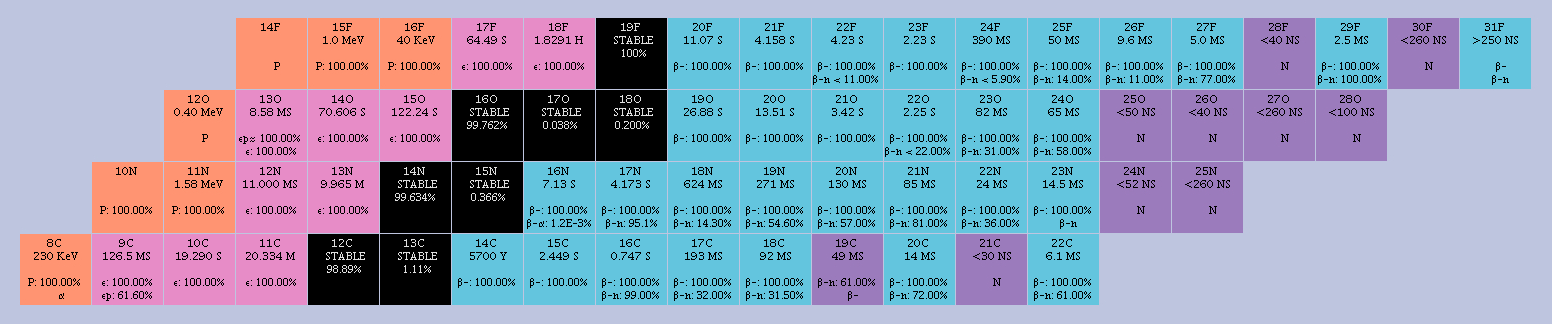
Chart of nuclides for carbon to fluorine. The proton drip line forms the left boundary; the neutron drip line, the right. Decay modes: proton emission positron emission or electron capture stable isotope beta decay neutron emission

The nuclear drip line is the boundary beyond which atomic nuclei are unbound with respect to the emission of a proton or neutron.

An arbitrary combination of protons and neutrons does not necessarily yield a stable nucleus. One can think of moving up or to the right across the table of nuclides by adding a proton or a neutron, respectively, to a given nucleus. However, adding nucleons one at a time to a given nucleus will eventually lead to a newly formed nucleus that immediately decays by emitting a proton (or neutron). Colloquially speaking, the nucleon has leaked or dripped out of the nucleus, hence giving rise to the term drip line.

Drip lines are defined for protons and neutrons at the extreme of the proton-to-neutron ratio; at p:n ratios at or beyond the drip lines, no bound nuclei can exist. While the location of the proton drip line is well known for many elements, the location of the neutron drip line is only known for elements up to neon.

== General description ==
Nuclear stability is limited to those combinations of protons and neutrons described by the chart of the nuclides, also called the valley of stability. The boundaries of this valley are the neutron drip line on the neutron-rich side, and the proton drip line on the proton-rich side. These limits exist because of particle decay, whereby an exothermic nuclear transition can occur by the emission of one or more nucleons (not to be confused with particle decay in particle physics). As such, the drip line may be defined as the boundary beyond which proton or neutron separation energy becomes negative, favoring the emission of a particle from a newly formed unbound system.

=== Allowed transitions ===
When considering whether a specific nuclear transmutation, a reaction or a decay, is energetically allowed, one only needs to sum the masses of the initial nucleus/nuclei and subtract from that value the sum of the masses of the product particles. If the result, or Q-value, is positive, then the transmutation is allowed, or exothermic because it releases energy, and if the Q-value is a negative quantity, then it is endothermic as at least that much energy must be added to the system before the transmutation may proceed. For example, to determine if ^{12}C, the most common isotope of carbon, can undergo proton emission to ^{11}B, one finds that about 16 MeV must be added to the system for this process to be allowed. While Q-values can be used to describe any nuclear transmutation, for particle decay, the particle separation energy quantity S, is also used, and it is equivalent to the negative of the Q-value. In other words, the proton separation energy S_{p} indicates how much energy must be added to a given nucleus to remove a single proton. Thus, the particle drip lines defined the boundaries where the particle separation energy is less than or equal to zero, for which the spontaneous emission of that particle is energetically allowed.

Although the location of the drip lines is well defined as the boundary beyond which particle separation energy becomes negative, the definition of what constitutes a nucleus or an unbound resonance is unclear. Some known nuclei of light elements beyond the drip lines decay with lifetimes on the order of 10^{−22} seconds; this is sometimes defined to be a limit of nuclear existence because several fundamental nuclear processes (such as vibration and rotation) occur on this timescale. For more massive nuclei, particle emission half-lives may be significantly longer due to a stronger Coulomb barrier and enable other transitions such as alpha and beta decay to instead occur. This renders unambiguous determination of the drip lines difficult, as nuclei with lifetimes long enough to be observed exist far longer than the timescale of particle emission and are most probably bound. Consequently, particle-unbound nuclei are difficult to observe directly, and are instead identified through their decay energy.

=== Nuclear structure origin of the drip lines ===
The energy of a nucleon in a nucleus is its rest mass energy minus a binding energy. In addition to this, there is an energy due to degeneracy: for instance, a nucleon with energy E_{1} will be forced to a higher energy E_{2} if all the lower energy states are filled. This is because nucleons are fermions and obey Fermi–Dirac statistics. The work done in putting this nucleon to a higher energy level results in a pressure, which is the degeneracy pressure. When the effective binding energy, or Fermi energy, reaches zero, adding a nucleon of the same isospin to the nucleus is not possible, as the new nucleon would have a negative effective binding energy — i.e. it is more energetically favourable (system will have lowest overall energy) for the nucleon to be created outside the nucleus. This defines the particle drip point for that species.

=== One- and two-particle drip lines ===
In many cases, nuclides along the drip lines are not contiguous, but rather are separated by so-called one-particle and two-particle drip lines. This is a consequence of even and odd nucleon numbers affecting binding energy, as nuclides with even numbers of nucleons generally have a higher binding energy, and hence greater stability, than adjacent odd nuclei. These energy differences result in the one-particle drip line in an odd-Z or odd-N nuclide, for which prompt proton or neutron emission is energetically favorable in that nuclide and all other odd nuclides further outside the drip line. However, the next even nuclide outside the one-particle drip line may still be particle stable if its two-particle separation energy is non-negative. This is possible because the two-particle separation energy is always greater than the one-particle separation energy, and a transition to a less stable odd nuclide is energetically forbidden. The two-particle drip line is thus defined where the two-particle separation energy becomes negative, and denotes the outermost boundary for particle stability of a species.

The one- and two-neutron drip lines have been experimentally determined up to neon, though unbound odd-N isotopes are known or deduced through non-observance for every element up to magnesium. For example, the last bound odd-N fluorine isotope is ^{26}F, though the last bound even-N isotope is ^{31}F.

== Nuclei near the drip lines are uncommon on Earth ==
Of the three types of naturally occurring radioactivities (α, β, and γ), only alpha decay is a type of decay resulting from the nuclear strong force. The other proton and neutron decays occurred much earlier in the life of the atomic species and before the earth was formed. Thus, alpha decay can be considered either a form of particle decay or, less frequently, as a special case of nuclear fission. The timescale for the nuclear strong force is much faster than that of the nuclear weak force or the electromagnetic force, so the lifetime of nuclei past the drip lines are typically on the order of nanoseconds or less. For alpha decay, the timescale can be much longer than for proton or neutron emission owing to the high Coulomb barrier seen by an alpha-cluster in a nucleus (the alpha particle must tunnel through the barrier). As a consequence, there are no naturally occurring nuclei on Earth that undergo proton or neutron emission; however, such nuclei can be created, for example, in the laboratory with accelerators or naturally in stars. The Facility for Rare Isotope Beams (FRIB) at Michigan State University came online in mid-2022 and has created many novel radioisotopes, each of which is extracted in a beam and used for study. FRIB runs a beam of relatively stable isotopes through a medium, which disrupts the nuclei and creates numerous novel nuclei, which are then extracted.

=== Nucleosynthesis ===
Explosive astrophysical environments often have very large fluxes of high-energy nucleons that can be captured on seed nuclei. In these environments, radiative proton or neutron capture will occur much faster than beta decays, and as astrophysical environments with both large neutron fluxes and high-energy protons are unknown at present, the reaction flow will proceed away from beta-stability towards or up to either the neutron or proton drip lines, respectively. However, once a nucleus reaches a drip line, as we have seen, no more nucleons of that species can be added to the particular nucleus, and the nucleus must first undergo a beta decay before further nucleon captures can occur.

==== Photodisintegration ====
While the drip lines impose the ultimate boundaries for nucleosynthesis, in high-energy environments the burning pathway may be limited before the drip lines are reached by photodisintegration, where a high-energy gamma ray knocks a nucleon out of a nucleus. The same nucleus is subject both to a flux of nucleons and photons, so an equilibrium between neutron capture and photodisintegration is reached for nuclides with a sufficiently low neutron separation energy, particularly those near waiting points.

As the photon bath will typically be described by a Planckian distribution, higher energy photons will be less abundant, and so photodisintegration will not become significant until the nucleon separation energy begins to approach zero towards the drip lines, where photodisintegration may be induced by lower energy gamma rays. At 10^{9} kelvin, the photon distribution is energetic enough to knock nucleons out of any nuclei that have particle separation energies less than 3 MeV, but to know which nuclei exist in what abundances one must also consider the competing radiative captures.

As neutron captures can proceed in any energy regime, neutron photodisintegration is unimportant except at higher energies. However, as proton captures are inhibited by the Coulomb barrier, the cross sections for those charged-particle reactions at lower energies are greatly suppressed, and in the higher energy regimes where proton captures have a large probability to occur, there is often a competition between the proton capture and the photodisintegration that occurs in explosive hydrogen burning; but because the proton drip line is relatively much closer to the valley of beta-stability than is the neutron drip line, nucleosynthesis in some environments may proceed as far as either nucleon drip line.

==== Waiting points and time scales ====
Once radiative capture can no longer proceed on a given nucleus, either from photodisintegration or the drip lines, further nuclear processing to higher mass must either bypass this nucleus by undergoing a reaction with a heavier nucleus such as ^{4}He, or more often wait for the beta decay. Nuclear species where a significant fraction of the mass builds up during a particular nucleosynthesis episode are considered nuclear waiting points, since further processing by fast radiative captures is delayed.

As has been emphasized, the beta decays are the slowest processes occurring in explosive nucleosynthesis. They are so slow they are called s-process ("slow process"). From the nuclear physics side, explosive nucleosynthesis time scales are set simply by summing the beta decay half-lives involved, since the time scale for other nuclear processes is negligible in comparison, although practically speaking this time scale is typically dominated by the sum of a handful of waiting point nuclear half lives.

==== The r-process ====
The rapid neutron capture process is believed to operate very close to the neutron drip line, though the astrophysical site of the r-process, while widely believed to take place in core-collapse supernovae, is unknown. While the neutron drip line is very poorly determined experimentally, and the exact reaction flow is not precisely known, various models predict that nuclei along the r-process path have a two-neutron separation energy (S_{2n}) of approximately 2 MeV. Beyond this point, stability is thought to rapidly decrease in the vicinity of the drip line, with beta decay occurring before further neutron capture. In fact, the nuclear physics of extremely neutron-rich matter is a fairly new subject, and already has led to the discovery of the island of inversion and halo nuclei such as ^{11}Li, which has a very diffuse neutron skin leading to a total radius comparable to that of ^{208}Pb. Thus, although the neutron drip line and the r-process are linked very closely in research, it is an unknown frontier awaiting future research, both from theory and experiment.

==== The rp-process ====
The rapid proton capture process in X-ray bursts runs at the proton drip line except near some photodisintegration waiting points. This includes the nuclei ^{21}Mg, ^{30}S, ^{34}Ar, ^{38}Ca, ^{56}Ni, ^{60}Zn, ^{64}Ge, ^{68}Se, ^{72}Kr, ^{76}Sr, and ^{80}Zr.

One clear nuclear structure pattern that emerges is the importance of pairing, as one notices all the waiting points above are at nuclei with an even number of protons, and all but ^{21}Mg also have an even number of neutrons. However, the waiting points will depend on the assumptions of the X-ray burst model, such as metallicity, accretion rate, and the hydrodynamics, along with the nuclear uncertainties, and as mentioned above, the exact definition of the waiting point may not be consistent from one study to the next. Although there are nuclear uncertainties, compared to other explosive nucleosynthesis processes, the rp-process is quite well experimentally constrained, as, for example, all the above waiting point nuclei have at the least been observed in the laboratory. Thus as the nuclear physics inputs can be found in the literature or data compilations, the Computational Infrastructure for Nuclear Astrophysics allows one to do post-processing calculations on various X-ray burst models, and define for oneself the criteria for the waiting point, as well as alter any nuclear parameters.

While the rp-process in X-ray bursts may have difficulty bypassing the ^{64}Ge waiting point, certainly in X-ray pulsars where the rp-process can proceed, instability toward alpha decay places an upper limit of A = 107 on the mass that can be reached through continuous burning. Photonuclear (γ,p) and (γ,α) reactions prevent any further progress beyond the so-called tin-antimony-tellurium (SnSbTe) cycles. Even before this limit is reached, the proton flux is thought to considerably decrease and thus slow down the rp-process, and low capture rates mean that the terminating SnSbTe cycle should not usually be reached. However, it has been shown that if there are episodes of cooling or mixing of previous ashes into the burning zone, material as heavy as ^{126}Xe can be created.

=== Neutron stars ===
In neutron stars, neutron heavy nuclei are found as relativistic electrons penetrate the nuclei and produce inverse beta decay, wherein the electron combines with a proton in the nucleus to make a neutron and an electron-neutrino:

p	+	e^{−}	→	n	+	ν_{e}

As more and more neutrons are created in nuclei the energy levels for neutrons get filled up to an energy level equal to the rest mass of a neutron. At this point any electron penetrating a nucleus will create a neutron, which will "drip" out of the nucleus. At this point we have:

$$E_\text{F}^n = m_n c^2 \,$$

And from this point onwards the equation

$$E_\text{F}^n = \sqrt{\left(p_\text{F}^n\right)^2 c^2 + m_n^2 c^4} \,$$

applies, where p_{F}^{n} is the Fermi momentum of the neutron. As we go deeper into the neutron star the free neutron density increases, and as the Fermi momentum increases with increasing density, the Fermi energy increases, so that energy levels lower than the top level reach neutron drip and more and more neutrons drip out of nuclei so that we get nuclei in a neutron fluid. Eventually all the neutrons drip out of nuclei and we have reached the neutron fluid interior of the neutron star.

== Known values ==
=== Neutron drip line ===
The values of the neutron drip line are only known for the first ten elements, hydrogen to neon. For oxygen (Z = 8), the maximal number of bound neutrons is 16, rendering ^{24}O the heaviest particle-bound oxygen isotope. For neon (Z = 10), the maximal number of bound neutrons increases to 24 in the heaviest particle-stable isotope ^{34}Ne. The location of the neutron drip line for fluorine and neon was determined in 2017 by the non-observation of isotopes immediately beyond the drip line. The same experiment found that the heaviest bound isotope of the next element, sodium, is at least ^{39}Na. These were the first new discoveries along the neutron drip line in over twenty years.

The neutron drip line is expected to diverge from the line of beta stability after calcium with an average neutron-to-proton ratio of 2.4. Hence, is predicted that the neutron drip line will fall out of reach for elements beyond zinc (where the drip line is estimated around N = 60) or possibly zirconium (estimated N = 88), as no known experimental techniques are theoretically capable of creating the necessary imbalance of protons and neutrons in drip line isotopes of heavier elements. Indeed, neutron-rich isotopes such as ^{49}S, ^{52}Cl, and ^{53}Ar that were calculated to lie beyond the drip line have been reported as bound in 2017–2019, indicating that the neutron drip line may lie even farther away from the beta-stability line than predicted.

The table below lists the heaviest particle-bound isotope of the first ten elements.

Z	Isotope
1	^{3}H
2	^{6}He, ^{8}He
3	^{9}Li, ^{11}Li
4	^{12}Be, ^{14}Be
5	^{17}B, ^{19}B
6	^{20}C, ^{22}C
7	^{23}N
8	^{24}O
9	^{27}F, ^{29}F, ^{31}F
10	^{32}Ne, ^{34}Ne

Not all lighter isotopes are bound. For example, ^{39}Na is bound, but ^{38}Na is unbound.

=== Proton drip line ===
The general location of the proton drip line is well established. For all elements occurring naturally on earth and having an odd number of protons, at least one species with a proton separation energy less than zero has been experimentally observed. Up to germanium, the location of the drip line for many elements with an even number of protons is known, but none past that point are listed in the evaluated nuclear data. There are a few exceptional cases where, due to nuclear pairing, there are some particle-bound species outside the drip line, such as ^{8}B and ^{176}Au. Nearing the magic numbers, the drip line is less understood. A compilation of the last isotopes before the proton drip line is given below, with the number of protons, Z and the corresponding isotopes, taken from the National Nuclear Data Center.

Z	Isotope
2	^{3}He
3	^{6}Li
4	^{7}Be
5	^{8}B, ^{10}B
6	^{9}C
7	^{12}N
8	^{13}O
9	^{17}F
10	^{17}Ne
11	^{20}Na
12	^{20}Mg
13	^{22}Al
14	^{22}Si
15	^{26}P
16	^{27}S
17	^{31}Cl
18	^{31}Ar
19	^{35}K
21	^{40}Sc
22	^{39}Ti
23	^{43}V
25	^{46}Mn
27	^{51}Co
29	^{56}Cu
30	^{55}Zn
31	^{60}Ga
32	^{59}Ge
33	^{66}As
35	^{70}Br
37	^{74}Rb
39	^{78}Y
41	^{82}Nb
43	^{86}Tc
45	^{90}Rh
47	^{94}Ag
49	^{98}In
51	^{106}Sb
53	^{111}I
55	^{116}Cs
57	^{120}La
59	^{124}Pr
61	^{129}Pm
63	^{135}Eu
65	^{140}Tb
67	^{146}Ho
69	^{150}Tm
71	^{156}Lu
73	^{160}Ta
75	^{166}Re
77	^{172}Ir
79	^{176}Au, ^{178}Au
81	^{182}Tl
83	^{190}Bi
85	^{196}At
87	^{202}Fr
89	^{208}Ac
91	^{215}Pa
93	^{220}Np

== See also ==
- Extended periodic table
- Table of nuclides
- Radioactive decay
