= Joint Institute for Nuclear Astrophysics =

US research institute

The Joint Institute for Nuclear Astrophysics Center for the Evolution of the Elements (JINA-CEE) is a multi-institutional Physics Frontiers Center funded by the US National Science Foundation since 2014. From 2003 to 2014, JINA was a collaboration between Michigan State University, the University of Notre Dame, the University of Chicago, and directed by Michael Wiescher from the University of Notre Dame. Principal investigators were Hendrik Schatz, Timothy Beers and Jim Truran.

JINA-CEE is a collaboration between Michigan State University, the University of Notre Dame, University of Washington and Arizona State University and a number of associated institutions, centers, and national laboratories in the US and across the world, with the goal to bring together nuclear experimenters, nuclear theorists, astrophysical modelers, astrophysics theorists, and observational astronomers to address the open scientific questions at the intersection of nuclear physics and astrophysics. JINA-CEE serves as an intellectual center and focal point for the field of nuclear astrophysics, and is intended to enable scientific work and exchange of data and information across field boundaries within its collaboration, and for the field as a whole though workshops, schools, and web-based tools and data bases. It is led by director Hendrik Schatz with Michael Wiescher, Timothy Beers, Sanjay Reddy and Frank Timmes as principal investigators.

Most JINA-CEE nuclear physics experiments are carried out at the Nuclear Science Laboratory at the University of Notre Dame, the National Superconducting Cyclotron Laboratory at Michigan State University and the ATLAS/CARIBOU facility at Argonne National Laboratory. JINA-CEE is heavily involved in observations with the Apache Point Observatory within the framework of extensions to the Sloan Digital Sky Survey, LAMOST in China, SkyMapper in Australia, and the Hubble Space Telescope. Among many other observational data, JINA-CEE also uses heavily X-ray observational data from BeppoSAX, RXTE, Chandra, XMM-Newton, and INTEGRAL. JINA stimulated the development of similar centers in other countries, and collaborates with a number of multi-institutional nuclear astrophysics centers in Germany, including NAVI, EMMI and the Universe Cluster in Munich.

== REACLIB Database ==
One of the many projects of JINA-CEE is the maintenance of an up-to-date nuclear reaction rate library called REACLIB. REACLIB contains over 75,000 thermonuclear reaction rates.

== Virtual Journals ==
Nuclear astrophysics is made of many overlapping disciplines, spanning fields in astronomy, astrophysics and nuclear physics. In order to understand the origin of the elements, or the evolution and deaths of stars in galaxies, quite a broad base of knowledge is required. JINA-CEE created two virtual journals in order to meet the need for coverage of this broad-based information. The JINA Virtual Journal debuted in 2003, and reviews a broad realm of nuclear astrophysics, followed by the SEGUE Virtual Journal in 2006, focusing more on Galactic Chemical and Structural evolution. Each week, the editors search almost 40 refereed journals for newly published articles. Editors review the articles, flagging those that are relevant, and categorize them into their respective subjects (which are searchable by individual users). When the virtual journals are published, an email notification is sent to subscribers informing them of the newly available selections from the Virtual Journals.

== Education ==
Education, outreach, and creating inclusive environments are high priorities for JINA-CEE. JINA-CEE has a multitude of educational and outreach programs aimed at attracting young people to science careers, research training, and disseminating research findings to the public. Educational programs target audiences ranging from K-12 to Graduate Students and Postdocs.
