= HD 222925 =

Chemically peculiar star

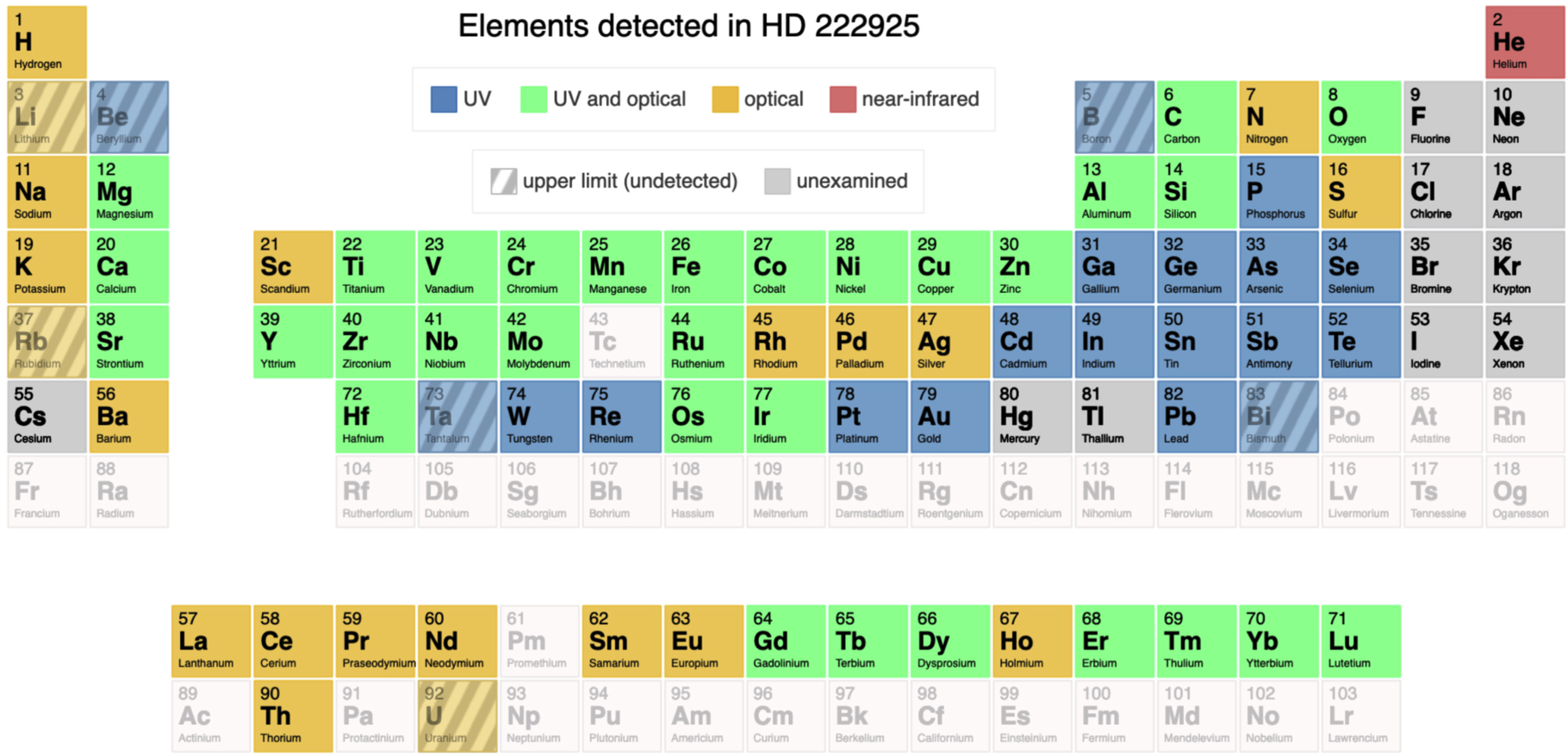
- Elements detected in HD 222925 totalling 65 with 42 coming from the r-process (31 ≤ Z ≤ 92) . Elements with no long-lived isotopes are indicated using the light gray font.

Observation data Epoch J2000.00 Equinox ICRS
- Constellation: Tucana
- Right ascension: 23^{h} 45^{m} 17.607^{s}
- Declination: −61° 54′ 42.84″
- Apparent magnitude (V): 9.03

Characteristics
- Evolutionary stage: horizontal branch
- Spectral type: F8 Sr Eu (ApSrEu)

Astrometry
Radial velocity (R_{v})	−38.9±0.6 km/s
Proper motion (μ)	RA: 143.803 mas/yr Dec.: −99.109 mas/yr
Parallax (π)	2.2202±0.0117 mas
Distance	1,469 ± 8 ly (450 ± 2 pc)

Details
Mass	0.75±0.20 M_{☉}
Radius	6 R_{☉}
Luminosity	43 L_{☉}
Surface gravity (log g)	2.54±0.17 cgs
Temperature	5,636±103 K
Metallicity [Fe/H]	−1.47±0.08 dex

Other designations
- CD−62°1462, HD 222925, HIP 117168

Database references
SIMBAD	data

HD 222925 is a horizontal branch star about 1,470 light years away in the southern constellation Tucana. It is magnitude 9, far below naked-eye visibility. It is an Ap star, a type of chemically peculiar star with an over-abundance of certain metals in its spectrum.

HD 222925 has been referred to as the 'gold standard star' by the media. In 2022, astronomers from the University of Michigan identified 65 elements in the star (including gold), a turning point to help the scientific community understand the rapid neutron capture process. The elements were produced in a massive supernova or a merger of neutron stars early in the universe, and it was ejected into space where it later reformed into the current star.

== Gallery ==
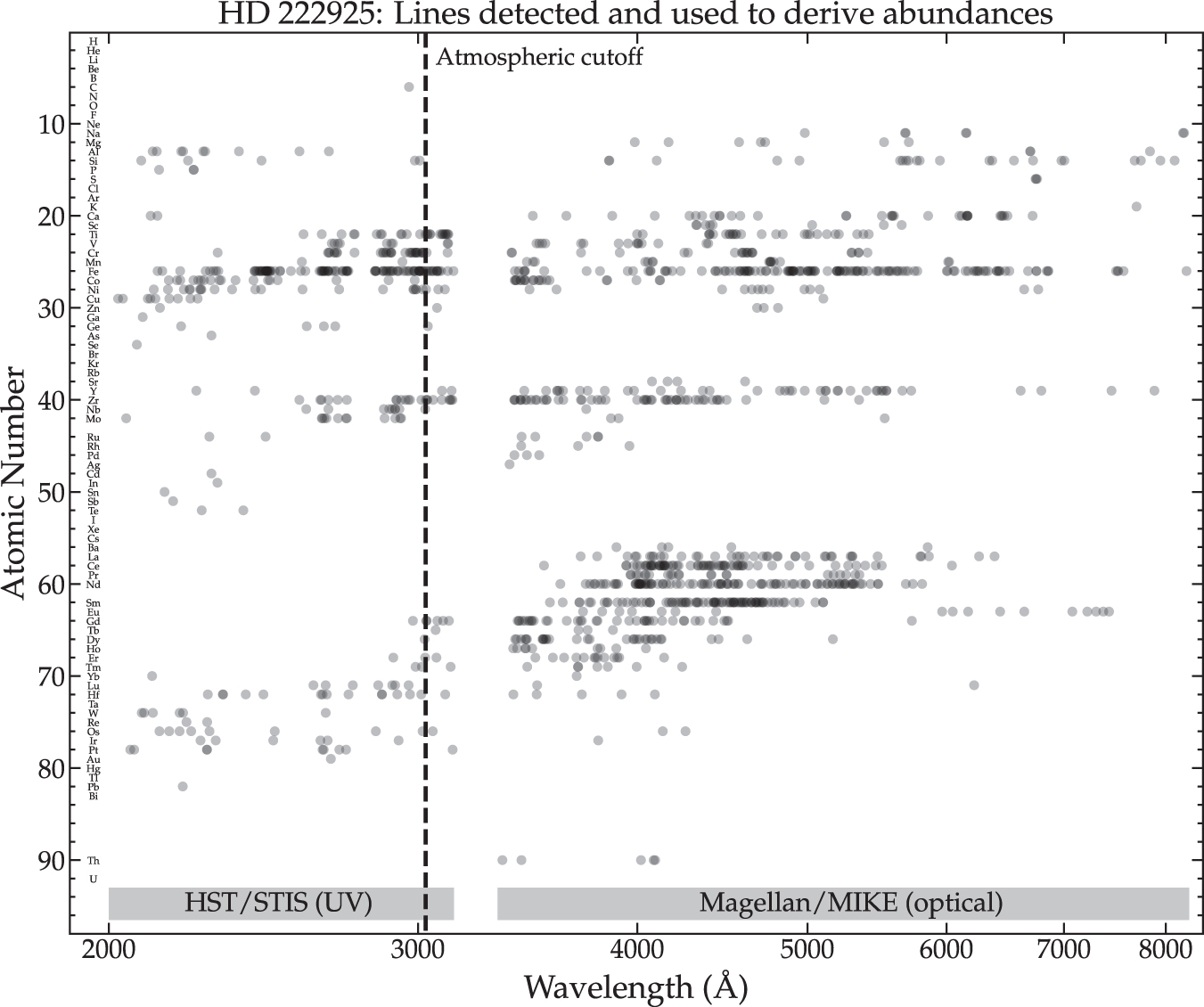
Wavelength for each element detected by atomic number with each spectral line represented as a dot. A gap between ≈3145 Å and ≈3330 Å reflecting an atmospheric cutoff between STIS and MIKE spectra.

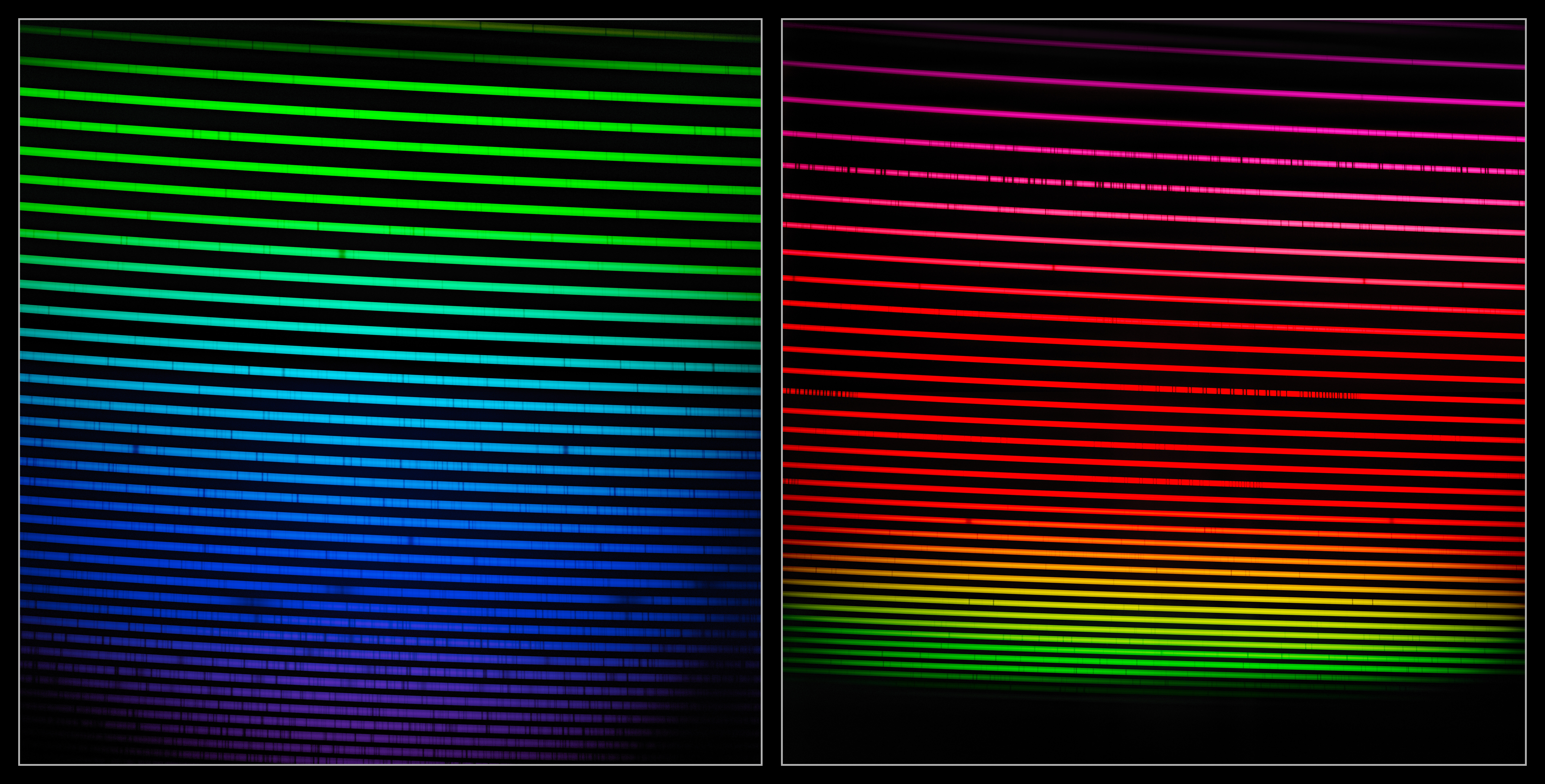
This mosaic shows two GHOST spectra of HD 222925.
