= Rp-process =

Process of nucleosynthesis

Nucleosynthesis of proton-rich nuclei by rapid proton capture

The rp-process (rapid proton capture process) consists of consecutive proton captures onto seed nuclei to produce heavier elements. It is a nucleosynthesis process and, along with the s-process and the r-process, may be responsible for the generation of many of the heavy elements present in the universe. However, it is notably different from the other processes mentioned in that it occurs on the proton-rich side of stability as opposed to on the neutron-rich side of stability.

The end point of the rp-process (the highest-mass element it can create) is not yet well established, but research shows that in neutron stars it will not progress beyond tellurium. The definitive endpoint is reached at ^{107}Te because of instability toward alpha decay, and primarily photon-induced decay or (γ,α) reactions loop the path back onto itself. Therefore, an rp-process would only be able to produce nuclei with mass numbers up to 106 or 107. After this, further proton captures result in prompt proton emission or alpha emission, and thus the proton flux is consumed without yielding heavier elements; this end process is known as the tin–antimony–tellurium cycle, which that more recent source claims is not actually reached.

== Conditions ==
The process has to occur in very high-temperature environments (above 10^{9} kelvin) so that the protons can overcome the large Coulomb barrier for charged-particle reactions. A hydrogen-rich environment is also a prerequisite due to the large proton flux needed. The seed nuclei needed for this process to occur are thought to be formed during breakout reactions from the hot CNO cycle. Typically proton capture in the rp-process will compete with (α,p) reactions, as most environments with a high flux of hydrogen are also rich in helium. The time scale for the rp-process is set by β^{+} decays at or near the proton drip line, because the weak interaction is notoriously slower than the strong interaction and electromagnetic force at these high temperatures.

== Possible sites ==
Sites suggested for the rp-process are accreting binary systems where one star is a neutron star. In these systems the donor star is accreting material onto its compact partner star. The accreted material is usually rich in hydrogen and helium because of its origin from the surface layers of the donor star. Because such compact stars have high gravitational fields, the material falls with a high velocity towards the compact star, usually colliding with other accreted material en route, forming an accretion disk. In the case of accretion onto a neutron star, as this material slowly builds up on the surface, it will attain a temperature on the order of 10^{8} K.

Eventually it is believed that thermonuclear instabilities arise in this hot atmosphere, allowing the temperature to continue to rise until it leads to a runaway thermonuclear explosion of the hydrogen and helium. During the flash, the temperature quickly rises, becoming high enough for the rp-process to occur. While the initial flash of hydrogen and helium lasts only a second, the rp-process typically takes up to 100 seconds. Therefore, the rp-process is observed as the tail of the resulting X-ray burst.

== See also ==
- p-nuclei
