= Almudena Arcones =

Spanish nuclear astrophysicist

Almudena Arcones Segovia (born 1979) is a Spanish-German nuclear astrophysicist whose research topics have included the creation and decay of heavy elements through the r-process, and neutrino-driven outflows, in energetic stellar events including supernovae and neutron star mergers. She is a professor of theoretical astrophysics at Technische Universität Darmstadt in Germany, and a researcher in the GSI Helmholtz Centre for Heavy Ion Research in Darmstadt.

== Education and career ==
Arcones was born in 1979 in Madrid. She completed a Ph.D. in 2007 through the Max Planck Institute for Astrophysics under the supervision of Hans-Thomas Janka. After postdoctoral research at Technische Universität Darmstadt and then the University of Basel, she returned to Darmstadt with a tenure-track assistant professorship in 2012, and was promoted to associate professor in 2016. She holds a joint appointment in the GSI Helmholtz Centre for Heavy Ion Research in Darmstadt, and from 2012 to 2017 led a Helmholtz Young Investigator Group at the centre.

== Recognition ==
Arcones was named a Fellow of the American Physical Society (APS) in 2020, after a nomination from the APS Division of Nuclear Physics, "for seminal contributions in astro- and nuclear physics, especially to the understanding of heavy elements creation in supernovae, neutron star mergers, and their associated kilonova".
