= Facility for Rare Isotope Beams =

Nuclear science accelerator at Michigan State University, U.S.

Facility for Rare Isotope Beams (FRIB)
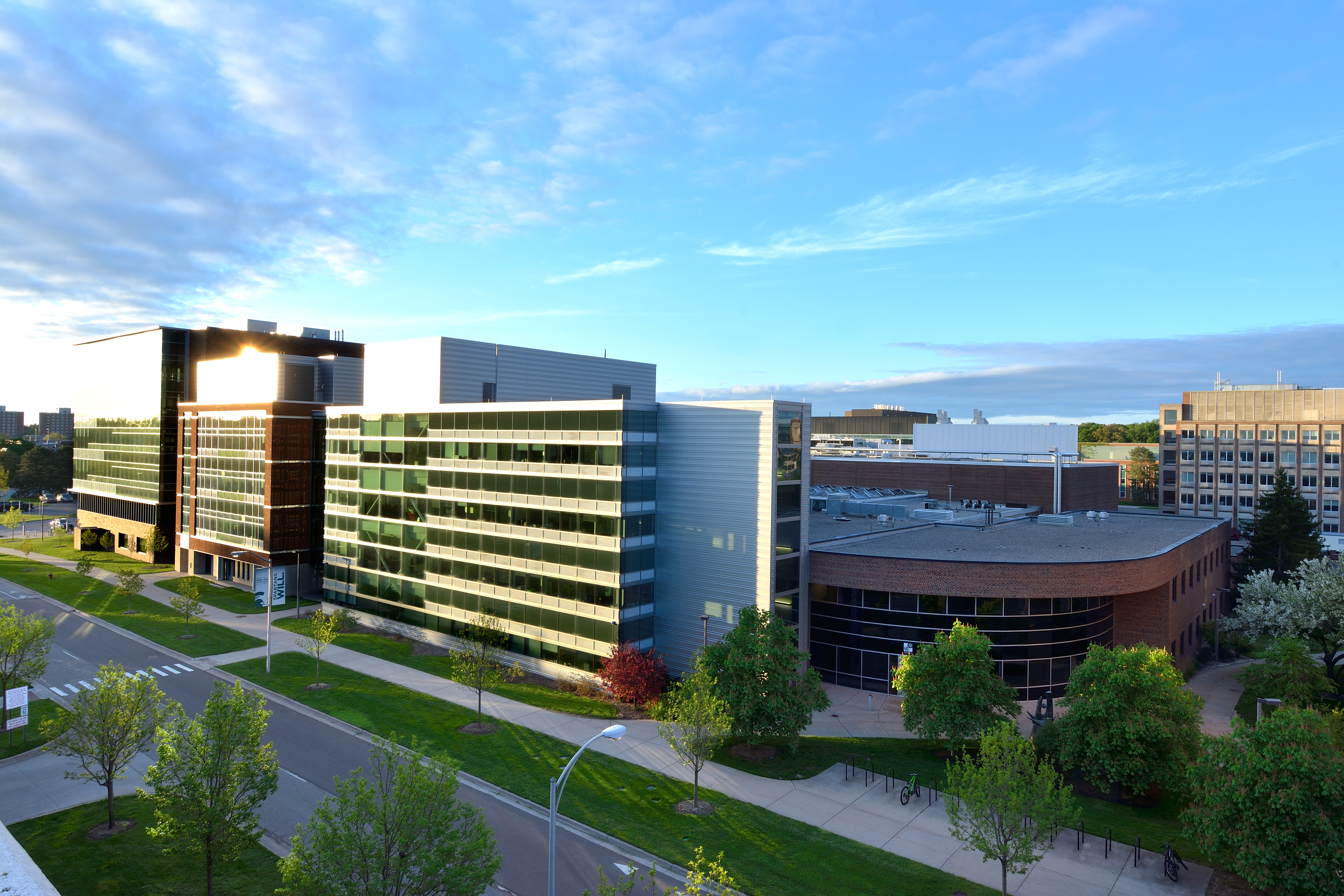
- A view of FRIB looking southeast

General information
- Type: DOE Office of Science User Facility
- Location: 640 South Shaw Lane, East Lansing, Michigan, United States
- Coordinates: 42°43′29.21″N 84°28′25.78″W
- Completed: June 2022
- Inaugurated: May 2, 2022
- Cost: US$765 million (Total Project Cost)
- Owner: Michigan State University

Technical details
- Floor area: 220,160 sq ft (20,454 m^{2})

Design and construction
- Architecture firm: SmithGroup JJR
- Main contractor: Barton Malow

Website
- frib.msu.edu

Facility for Rare Isotope Beams (FRIB)
General properties
- Accelerator type: linear accelerator
- Beam type: heavy ion
- Target type: fixed target

Beam properties
- Maximum energy: 295 MeV/u

Physical properties
- Length: 517 m
- Location: East Lansing, Michigan
- Institution: Michigan State University, US-DOE
- Dates of operation: 2022 - present
- Preceded by: National Superconducting Cyclotron Laboratory

The Facility for Rare Isotope Beams (FRIB) (Note: /frɪb/) is a scientific user facility for nuclear science, funded by the U.S. Department of Energy Office of Science (DOE-SC), Michigan State University (MSU), and the State of Michigan. Michigan State University contributed an additional $212 million in various ways, including the land. MSU established and operates FRIB as a user facility for the Office of Nuclear Physics in the U.S. Department of Energy Office of Science. At FRIB, scientists research the properties of rare isotopes to advance knowledge in the areas of nuclear physics, nuclear astrophysics, fundamental interactions of nuclei, and real-world applications of rare isotopes. Construction of the FRIB conventional facilities began in spring 2014 and was completed in 2017. Technical construction started in the fall of 2014 and was completed in January 2022. The total project cost was $730M with project completion in June 2022.

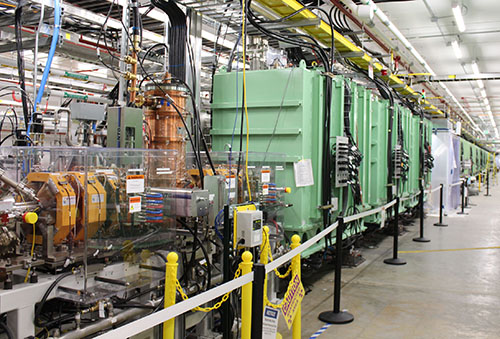
On 11–12 July 2018, the Facility for Rare Isotope Beams accelerated first beam in three of forty-six superconducting cryomodules (painted green). Beam in the warm radio-frequency quadrupole was previously accelerated in September 2017.

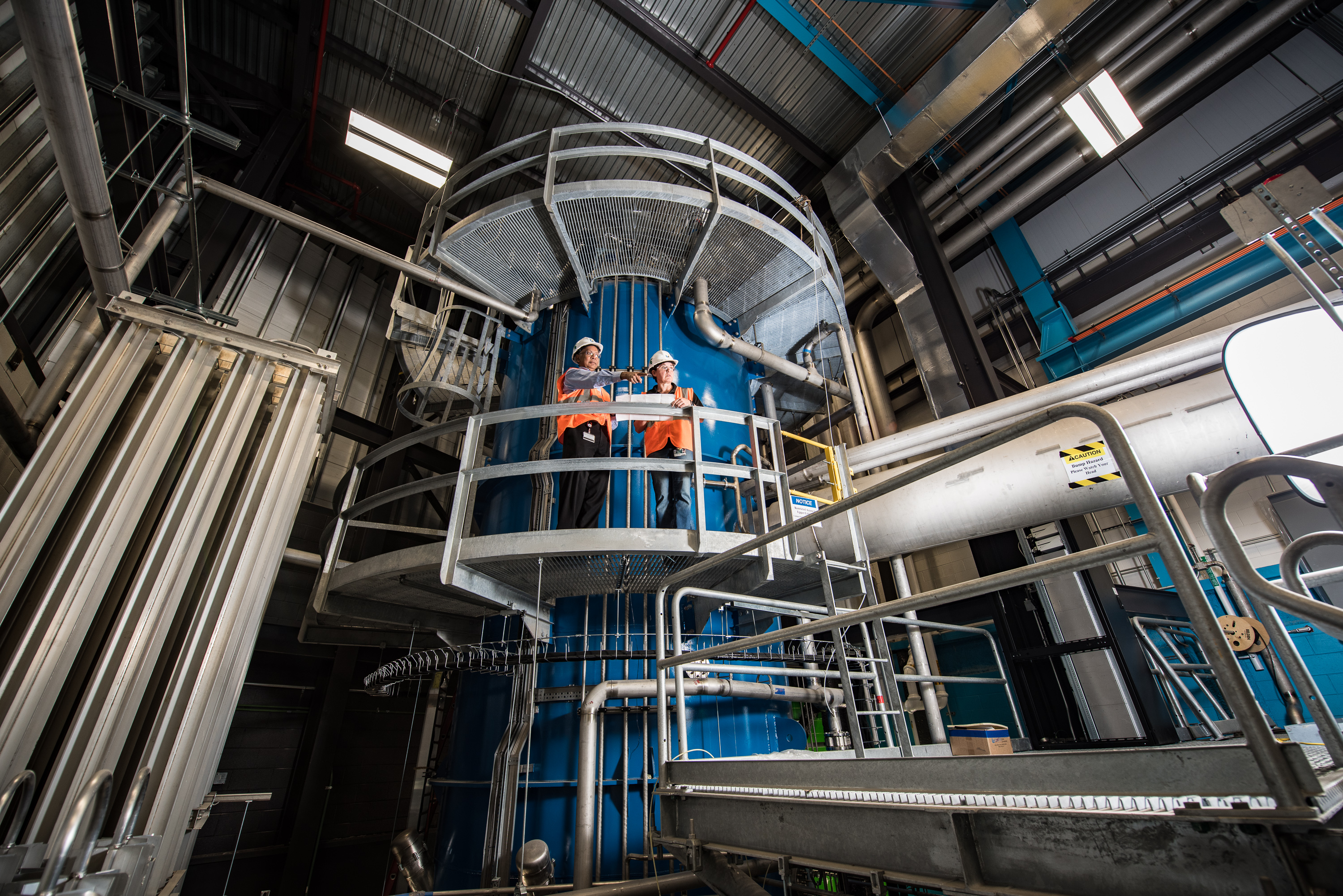
The FRIB cryogenic plant made its first liquid helium at 4.5 kelvin (K) on 16 November 2017. Photo courtesy of MSU Communications and Brand Strategy.

FRIB provides researchers with the technical capabilities to study the properties of rare isotopes (that is, short-lived atomic nuclei not normally found on Earth). Real-world applications of the research include materials science, nuclear medicine, and the fundamental understanding of nuclear material important to nuclear weapons stockpile stewardship. More than 20 working groups specializing in experimental equipment and scientific topics have been organized through the FRIB Users Organization.

The FRIB seeks to expand the known Chart of the Nuclides from some approximately 3000 identified isotopes to over 6000 potentially identifiable isotopes. It can accelerate beams of known isotopes through a matrix in order to disrupt the nuclei, forming a variety of unusual isotopes of short half-life. These isotopes are then 'filtered' by directing away the undesired charge/mass isotopes by a magnetic field, leaving a small beam of the desired novel isotope for study. Such beam can also target other known isotopes, fusing with the target, to create still further unknown isotopes, for further study. This method seeks to expand the Chart of the Nuclides towards its outer sides, the so-called Nuclear drip line. It also seeks to expand of the Chart towards heavier isotopes, towards the Island of stability and beyond.

The establishment of a Facility for Rare Isotope Beams (FRIB) is the first recommendation in the 2012 National Academies Decadal Study of Nuclear Physics: Nuclear Physics: Exploring the Heart of the Matter. The priority for completion is listed in the 2015 Long Range Plan for Nuclear Science: Implementing Reaching for the Horizon by the DOE/NSF Nuclear Science Advisory Committee.

The facility has a Health Physics program under the umbrella of the university's Environmental Health and Safety department.

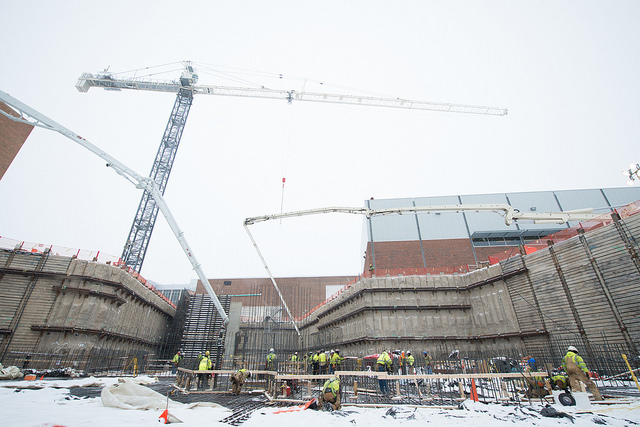
In March 2015, workers poured nearly 3,600 cubic yards of concrete into the linear accelerator tunnel. Photo courtesy of MSU Communications and Brand Strategy.

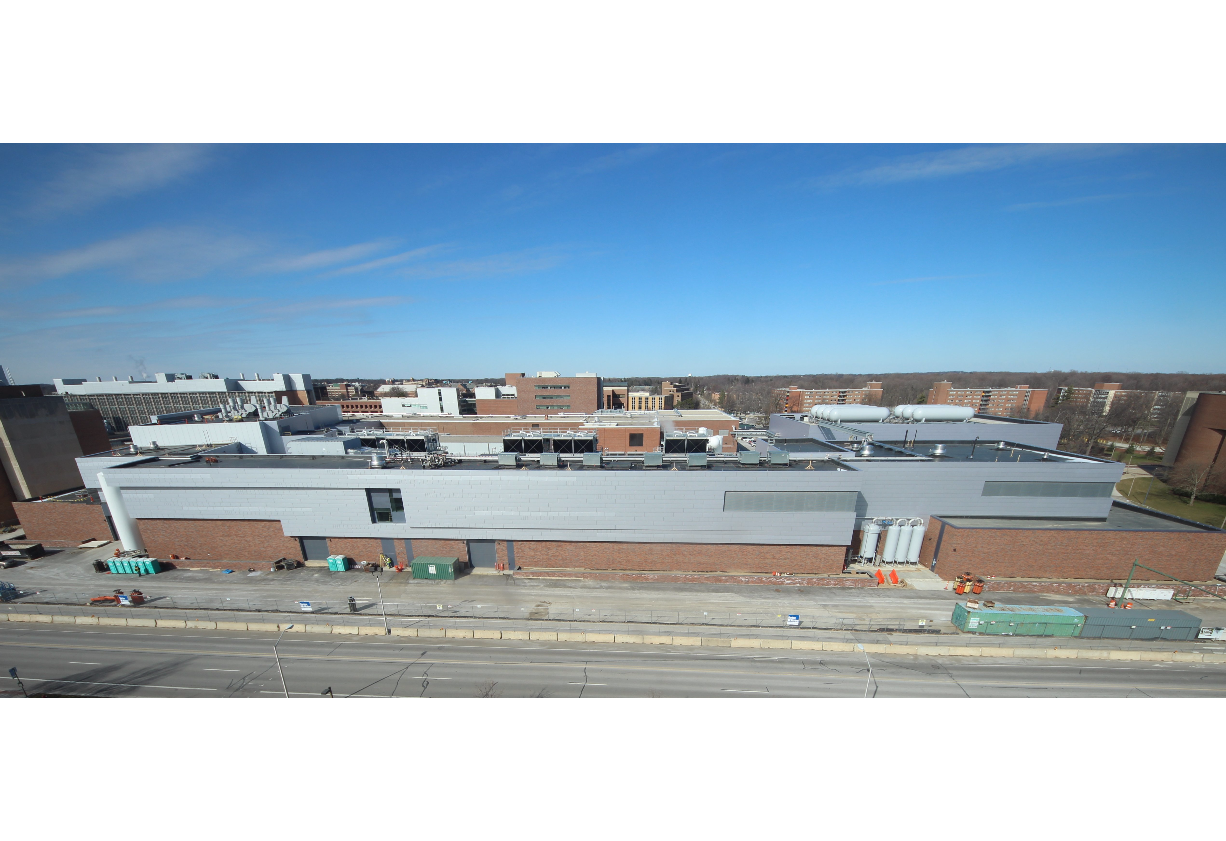
This photo from March 4, 2017, shows the construction of the Facility for Rare Isotope Beams.

== Developments ==
=== Construction and commissioning ===
On December 11, 2008, the DOE-SC announced the selection of Michigan State University to design and establish FRIB.

The project earned Critical Decision 1 (CD-1) approval in September 2010 which established a preferred alternative and the associated established cost and schedule ranges.

On August 1, 2013, DOE-SC approved the project baseline (CD-2) and the start of civil construction (CD-3a), pending a notice to proceed. Civil construction could not start under the continuing appropriations resolution, which disallowed new construction starts.

On February 25, 2014, the board of the Michigan Strategic Fund met at Michigan State University and approved nearly $91 million to support the construction of FRIB.

The FRIB marked the official start of civil construction with a groundbreaking ceremony March 17, 2014. In attendance were representatives from the Michigan delegation, State of Michigan, Michigan State University, and the U.S. Department of Energy Office of Science. Technical construction started in October 2014, following a CD-3b approval by DOE-SC.

In March 2017, FRIB achieved beneficial occupancy of civil construction, and technical installation activities escalated as a result.

In February 2019, FRIB accelerated beams through the first 15 (of 46 total) cryomodules to 10 percent of FRIB's final beam energy. In August 2019, the radio-frequency quadrupole (RFQ) was conditioned above 100 kW, the CW power needed to achieve the FRIB mission goal of accelerating uranium beams. The RFQ prepares the beam for further acceleration in the linac.

Construction on two MSU-funded building additions was substantially completed in January 2020. The Cryogenic Assembly Building is used for cryomodule maintenance and to perform cryogenic-engineering research. The High Rigidity Spectrometer and Isotope Harvesting Vault house isotope-harvesting research equipment and provide space for experiments.

In March 2020, FRIB accelerated an argon-36 beam through 37 of 46 superconducting cryomodules to 204 MeV/nucleon or 57 percent of the speed of light.

In September 2020, DOE designated FRIB as a DOE-SC User Facility. U.S. Secretary of Energy Dan Brouillette announced the designation at a special ceremony held outdoors at MSU, under a tent adjacent to FRIB.

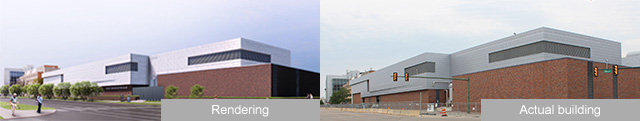
In March 2017, FRIB achieved beneficial occupancy of civil construction.

On February 24, 2021, the FRIB announced that 82 proposals requesting 9,784 hours of beam time and six letters of intent were submitted, covering 16 of the 17 National Academies benchmarks for FRIB, in response to their first call for proposals. These proposals represent FRIB's international user community of more than 1,500 scientists. Respondents include 597 individual scientists, 354 of whom are from the United States. They represent 130 institutions in 30 countries and 26 U.S. states.

On January 25, 2022, the FRIB project team delivered the first heavy-ion beam to the focal plane of the FRIB fragment separator, marking technical completion of the FRIB project.

On February 1–2, 2022, a review by the DOE-SC Office of Project Assessment reviewed FRIB's readiness for project completion and recommended that FRIB is ready for Critical Decision 4 (Approve Project Completion).

Michigan State University held a ribbon-cutting ceremony on May 2, 2022.

=== Operation ===
On June 22, 2022, the first experiment at FRIB, which studied the beta decay of calcium-48 fragments that are so unstable that they only exist for mere fractions of a second, concluded successfully. FRIB's first scientific user experiment had participation from Argonne National Laboratory, Brookhaven National Laboratory, Florida State University, FRIB, Lawrence Berkeley National Laboratory, Lawrence Livermore National Laboratory, Louisiana State University, Los Alamos National Laboratory, Mississippi State University, Oak Ridge National Laboratory, and the University of Tennessee. On November 14, 2022, the results of the first experiment were published in Physical Review Letters.

In 2023, the FRIB created its first new isotopes: thulium-182, thulium-183, ytterbium-186, ytterbium-187 and lutetium-190. Outside of particle accelerators, such isotopes are theorized to only be created during neutron star collisions.

On December 22, 2023, the FRIB successfully accelerated a beam of uranium-238 ions to 10.4kW: the highest-power accelerated continuous wave uranium beam ever produced at that time. Within its first eight hours of operation, the uranium beam led to the discovery of three previously-unobserved isotopes: gallium-88, arsenic-93, and selenium-96. In March 2025, the FRIB doubled this record, producing a 20.0kW uranium beam.

== See also ==
- Radioactive Isotope Beam Factory
- Facility for Antiproton and Ion Research
- Grand Accélérateur National d'Ions Lourds
- On-Line Isotope Mass Separator
- Rare Isotope Science Project
