= Seed nucleus =

Isotope that is the starting point of a fusion chain reaction

A seed nucleus is an isotope that is the starting point for any of a variety of fusion chain reactions. The mix of nuclei produced at the conclusion of the chain reaction generally depends strongly on the relative availability of the seed nucleus or nuclei and the component being fused—whether neutrons as in the r-process and s-process or protons as in the rp-process. A smaller proportion of seed nuclei will generally result in products of larger mass, whereas a larger seed-to-neutron or seed-to-proton ratio will tend to produce comparatively lighter masses.
