= Nuclear astrophysics =

Intersection of nuclear physics and astrophysics

Nuclear astrophysics studies the origin of the chemical elements and isotopes, and the role of nuclear energy generation, in cosmic sources such as stars, supernovae, novae, and violent binary-star interactions. It is an interdisciplinary part of both nuclear physics and astrophysics, involving close collaboration among researchers in various subfields of each of these fields. This includes, notably, nuclear reactions and their rates as they occur in cosmic environments, and modeling of astrophysical objects where these nuclear reactions may occur, but also considerations of cosmic evolution of isotopic and elemental composition (often called chemical evolution). Constraints from observations involve multiple messengers, all across the electromagnetic spectrum (nuclear gamma-rays, X-rays, optical, and radio/sub-mm astronomy), as well as isotopic measurements of solar-system materials such as meteorites and their stardust inclusions, cosmic rays, material deposits on the Earth and Moon. Nuclear physics experiments address stability (i.e., lifetimes and masses) for atomic nuclei well beyond the regime of stable nuclides into the realm of radioactive/unstable nuclei, almost to the limits of bound nuclei (the drip lines), and under high density (up to neutron star matter) and high temperature (plasma temperatures up to 10^{9} K). Theories and simulations are essential parts herein, as cosmic nuclear reaction environments cannot be realized, but at best partially approximated by experiments.

== History ==
In the 1940s, geologist Hans Suess speculated that the regularity that was observed in the abundances of elements may be related to structural properties of the atomic nucleus. These considerations were seeded by the discovery of radioactivity by Becquerel in 1896 as an aside of advances in chemistry which aimed at production of gold. This remarkable possibility for transformation of matter created much excitement among physicists for the next decades, culminating in discovery of the atomic nucleus, with milestones in Ernest Rutherford's scattering experiments in 1911, and the discovery of the neutron by James Chadwick (1932). After Aston demonstrated that the mass of helium is less than four times that of the proton, Eddington proposed that, through an unknown process in the Sun's core, hydrogen is transmuted into helium, liberating energy. Twenty years later, Bethe and von Weizsäcker independently derived the CN cycle, the first known nuclear reaction that accomplishes this transmutation. The interval between Eddington's proposal and derivation of the CN cycle can mainly be attributed to an incomplete understanding of nuclear structure. The basic principles for explaining the origin of elements and energy generation in stars appear in the concepts describing nucleosynthesis, which arose in the 1940s, led by George Gamow and presented in a 2-page paper in 1948 as the Alpher–Bethe–Gamow paper. A complete concept of processes that make up cosmic nucleosynthesis was presented in the late 1950s by Burbidge, Burbidge, Fowler, and Hoyle, and by Cameron. Fowler is largely credited with initiating collaboration between astronomers, astrophysicists, and theoretical and experimental nuclear physicists, in a field that we now know as nuclear astrophysics (for which he won the 1983 Nobel Prize). During these same decades, Arthur Eddington and others were able to link the liberation of nuclear binding energy through such nuclear reactions to the structural equations of stars.

These developments were not without curious deviations. Many notable physicists of the 19th century such as Mayer, Waterson, von Helmholtz, and Lord Kelvin, postulated that the Sun radiates thermal energy by converting gravitational potential energy into heat. Its lifetime as calculated from this assumption using the virial theorem, around 19 million years, was found inconsistent with the interpretation of geological records and the (then new) theory of biological evolution. Alternatively, if the Sun consisted entirely of a fossil fuel like coal, considering the rate of its thermal energy emission, its lifetime would be merely four or five thousand years, clearly inconsistent with records of human civilization.

== Basic concepts ==
During cosmic times, nuclear reactions re-arrange the nucleons that were left behind from the big bang (in the form of isotopes of hydrogen and helium, and traces of lithium, beryllium, and boron) to other isotopes and elements as we find them today (see graph). The driver is a conversion of nuclear binding energy to exothermic energy, favoring nuclei with more binding of their nucleons — these are then lighter as their original components by the binding energy. The most tightly-bound nucleus from symmetric matter of neutrons and protons is ^{56}Ni. The release of nuclear binding energy is what allows stars to shine for up to billions of years, and may disrupt stars in stellar explosions in case of violent reactions (such as ^{12}C+^{12}C fusion for thermonuclear supernova explosions). As matter is processed as such within stars and stellar explosions, some of the products are ejected from the nuclear-reaction site and end up in interstellar gas. Then, it may form new stars, and be processed further through nuclear reactions, in a cycle of matter. This results in compositional evolution of cosmic gas in and between stars and galaxies, enriching such gas with heavier elements. Nuclear astrophysics is the science to describe and understand the nuclear and astrophysical processes within such cosmic and galactic chemical evolution, linking it to knowledge from nuclear physics and astrophysics. Measurements are used to test our understanding: Astronomical constraints are obtained from stellar and interstellar abundance data of elements and isotopes, and other multi-messenger astronomical measurements of the cosmic object phenomena help to understand and model these. Nuclear properties can be obtained from terrestrial nuclear laboratories such as accelerators with their experiments. Theory and simulations are needed to understand and complement such data, providing models for nuclear reaction rates under the variety of cosmic conditions, and for the structure and dynamics of cosmic objects.

== Findings, current status, and issues ==
Nuclear astrophysics remains as a complex puzzle to science. The current consensus on the origins of elements and isotopes are that only hydrogen and helium (and traces of lithium) can be formed in a homogeneous Big Bang (see Big Bang nucleosynthesis), while all other elements and their isotopes are formed in cosmic objects that formed later, such as in stars and their explosions.

The Sun's primary energy source is hydrogen fusion to helium at about 15 million degrees. The proton–proton chain reactions dominate, they occur at much lower energies although much more slowly than catalytic hydrogen fusion through CNO cycle reactions. Nuclear astrophysics gives a picture of the Sun's energy source producing a lifetime consistent with the age of the Solar System derived from meteoritic abundances of lead and uranium isotopes – an age of about 4.5 billion years. The core hydrogen burning of stars, as it now occurs in the Sun, defines the main sequence of stars, illustrated in the Hertzsprung–Russell diagram that classifies stages of stellar evolution. The Sun's lifetime of H burning via pp-chains is about 9 billion years. This primarily is determined by extremely slow production of deuterium,

^{1}_{1}H	+	^{1}_{1}H	→	^{2}_{1}D	+	e^{+}	+	ν_{e}	+	0.42 MeV

which is governed by the weak interaction.

Work that led to discovery of neutrino oscillation (implying a non-zero mass for the neutrino absent in the Standard Model of particle physics) was motivated by a solar neutrino flux about three times lower than expected from theories — a long-standing concern in the nuclear astrophysics community colloquially known as the Solar neutrino problem.

The concepts of nuclear astrophysics are supported by observation of the element technetium (the lightest chemical element without stable isotopes) in stars, by galactic gamma-ray line emitters (such as ^{26}Al, ^{60}Fe, and ^{44}Ti), by radioactive-decay gamma-ray lines from the ^{56}Ni decay chain observed from two supernovae (SN1987A and SN2014J) coincident with optical supernova light, and by observation of neutrinos from the Sun and from supernova 1987a. These observations have far-reaching implications. ^{26}Al has a lifetime of a million years, which is very short on a galactic timescale, proving that nucleosynthesis is an ongoing process within our Milky Way Galaxy in the current epoch.

Abundances of the chemical elements in the Solar System. Hydrogen and helium are most common. The next three elements (Li, Be, B) are rare, intermediate-mass elements such as C, O, ..Si, Ca more abundant. Beyond Fe, there is a remarkable drop beyond Fe, heavier elements being 3-5 orders of magnitude less abundant. The two general trends in the remaining stellar-produced elements are: (1) an alternation of abundance of elements according to whether they have even or odd atomic numbers, and (2) a general decrease in abundance, as elements become heavier. Within this trend is a peak at abundances of iron and nickel and smaller peaks at elements whose beta-stable isotopes are located near neutron magic numbers.

Current descriptions of the cosmic evolution of elemental abundances are broadly consistent with those observed in the Solar System and galaxy.

The roles of specific cosmic objects in producing these elemental abundances are clear for some elements, and heavily debated for others. For example, iron is believed to originate mostly from thermonuclear supernova explosions (also called supernovae of type Ia), and carbon and oxygen is believed to originate mostly from massive stars and their explosions. Lithium, beryllium, and boron are believed to originate from spallation reactions of cosmic-ray nuclei such as carbon and heavier nuclei, breaking these apart. Elements heavier than nickel are produced via the slow and rapid neutron capture processes, each contributing roughly half the abundance of these elements. The s-process is believed to occur in the envelopes of dying stars, whereas some uncertainty exists regarding r-process sites. The r-process is believed to occur in supernova explosions and compact object mergers, though observational evidence is limited to a single event, GW170817, and relative yields of proposed r-process sites leading to observed heavy element abundances are uncertain.

The transport of nuclear reaction products from their sources through the interstellar and intergalactic medium also is unclear. Additionally, many nuclei that are involved in cosmic nuclear reactions are unstable and may only exist temporarily in cosmic sites, and their properties (e.g., binding energy) cannot be investigated in the laboratory due to difficulties in their synthesis. Similarly, stellar structure and its dynamics is not satisfactorily described in models and hard to observe except through asteroseismology, and supernova explosion models lack a consistent description based on physical processes, and include heuristic elements. Current research extensively utilizes computation and numerical modeling.

== Future work ==
Although the foundations of nuclear astrophysics appear clear and plausible, many puzzles remain. These include understanding helium fusion (specifically the ^{12}C(α,γ)^{16}O reaction(s)), astrophysical sites of the r-process, anomalous lithium abundances in population II stars, the explosion mechanism in core-collapse supernovae, and progenitors of thermonuclear supernovae.

== See also ==
- Nuclear physics
- Astrophysics
- Nucleosynthesis
- Abundance of the chemical elements
- Joint Institute for Nuclear Astrophysics
