= National Superconducting Cyclotron Laboratory =

Building in Michigan, United States

Coordinates: 42.724498°N 84.473716°W

MSU Cyclotron
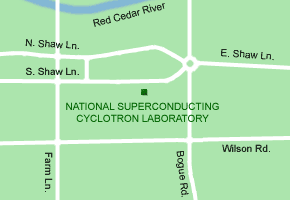
- The Cyclotron's location on campus
- Interactive map of the MSU Cyclotron area

General information
- Type: Cyclotron
- Architectural style: International Style
- Location: Science area Michigan State University
- Completed: 1963 (K500)

Dimensions
- Other dimensions: 2 cyclotrons

Design and construction
- Architect: Black (1963) et al.

Website
- NSCL Homepage

The National Superconducting Cyclotron Laboratory (NSCL), located on the campus of Michigan State University was a rare isotope research facility in the United States. Established in 1963, the cyclotron laboratory has been succeeded by the Facility for Rare Isotope Beams, a linear accelerator providing beam to the same detector halls.

NSCL was the nation's largest nuclear science facility on a university campus. Funded primarily by the National Science Foundation and MSU, the NSCL operated two superconducting cyclotrons. The lab's scientists investigated the properties of rare isotopes and nuclear reactions. In nature, these reactions would take place in stars and exploding stellar environments such as novae and supernovae. The K1200 cyclotron was the highest-energy continuous beam accelerator in the world (as compared to synchrotrons such as the Large Hadron Collider which provide beam in "cycles").

The laboratory's primary goal was to understand the properties of atomic nuclei. Atomic nuclei are ten thousand times smaller than the atoms they reside in, but they contain nearly all the atom's mass (more than 99.9 percent). Most of the atomic nuclei found on earth are stable, but there are many unstable and rare isotopes that exist in the universe, sometimes only for a fleeting moment in conditions of high pressure or temperature. The NSCL made and studied atomic nuclei that could not be found on earth. Rare isotope research is essential for understanding how the elements—and ultimately the universe—were formed.

The nuclear physics graduate program at MSU was ranked best in America by the 2018 Best Grad Schools index published by U.S. News & World Report.

== Laboratory upgrades ==
The upgrade plans are in close alignment with a report issued December 2006 by the National Academies, "Scientific Opportunities with a Rare-Isotope Facility in the United States", which defines a scientific agenda for a U.S.-based rare-isotope facility and addresses the need for such a facility in context of international efforts in this area. NSCL is working towards a significant capability upgrade that will keep the laboratory – and nuclear science – at the cutting edge well into the 21st century.

The upgrade of NSCL – the $750 million Facility for Rare Isotope Beams (FRIB), under construction as of 2020 – will boost intensities and varieties of rare isotope beams produced at MSU by replacing the K500 and K1200 cyclotrons with a powerful linear accelerator to be built beneath the ground. Such beams will allow researchers and students to continue to address a host of questions at the intellectual frontier of nuclear science: How does the behavior of novel and short-lived nuclei differ from more stable nuclei? What is the nature of nuclear processes in explosive stellar environments? What is the structure of hot nuclear matter at abnormal densities?

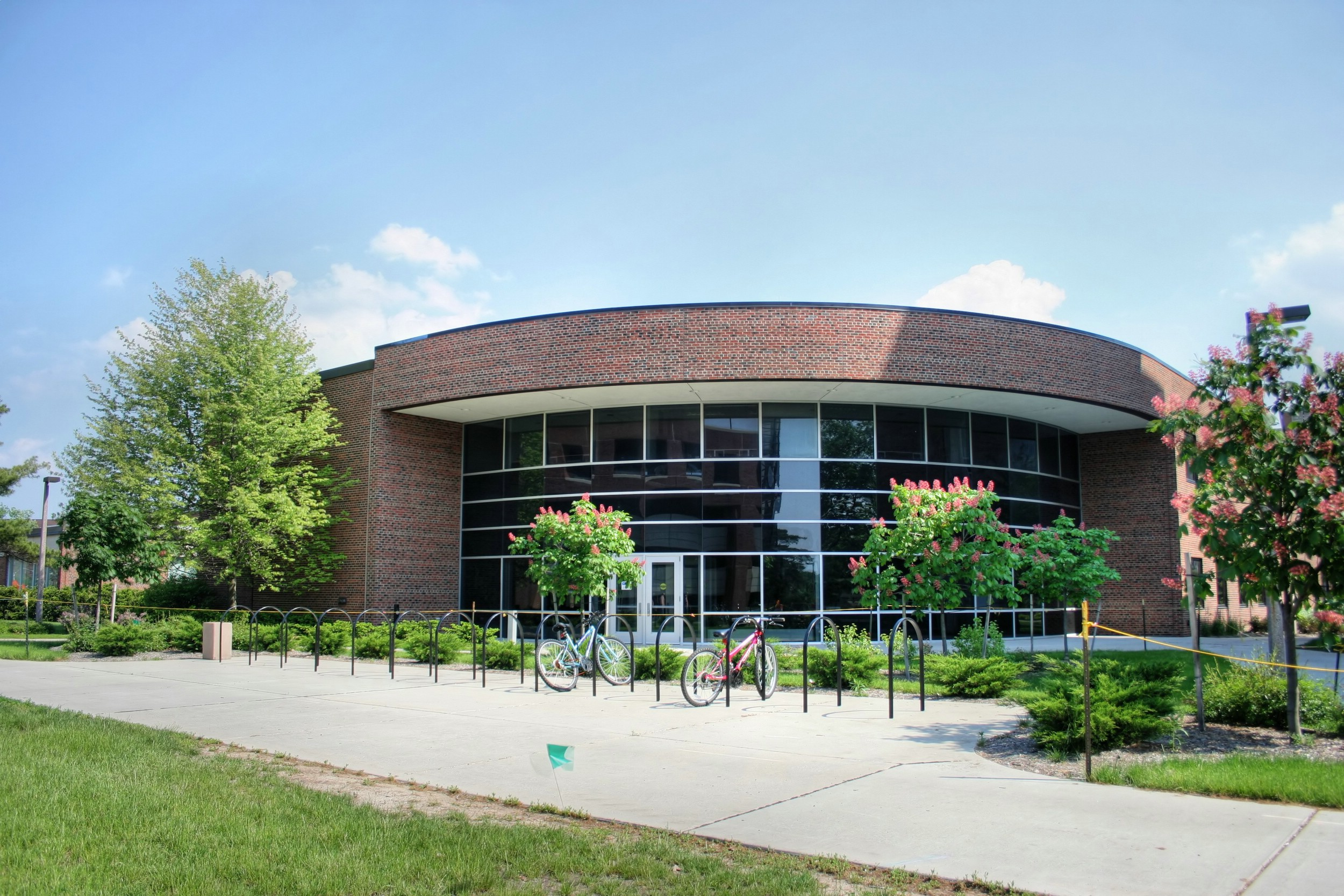
The National Superconducting Cyclotron Laboratory.

Beyond basic research, FRIB may lead to cross-disciplinary benefits. Experiments there will help astronomers better interpret data from ground- and space-based observatories. Scientists at the Isotope Science Facility will contribute to research on self-organization and complexity arising from elementary interactions, a topic relevant to the life sciences and quantum computing. Additionally, the facility's capabilities may lead to advances in fields as diverse as biomedicine, materials science, national and international security, and nuclear energy.

== Joint Institute for Nuclear Astrophysics ==
The Joint Institute for Nuclear Astrophysics (JINA) is a collaboration between Michigan State University, the University of Notre Dame, and the University of Chicago to address a broad range of experimental, theoretical, and observational questions in nuclear astrophysics. A portion of the Michigan State collaboration is housed at the National Superconducting Cyclotron Laboratory, directly involving roughly 30 nuclear physicists and astrophysicists.

== See also ==
- CERN
- Cyclotron
- Elementary particle
- FRIB
- Gesellschaft für Schwerionenforschung
- Particle physics
- Particle accelerator
