= R-process =

Nucleosynthesis pathway

In nuclear astrophysics, the rapid neutron-capture process, also known as the r-process, is a set of nuclear reactions that is responsible for the creation of approximately half of the atomic nuclei heavier than iron, the "heavy elements", with the other half produced largely by the s-process. The r-process synthesizes the more neutron-rich of the stable isotopes of even elements, and those separated from the beta-stable isotopes by those that are not often have very low s-process yields and are considered r-only nuclei; the heaviest isotopes of most even elements from zinc to mercury fall into this category. Abundance peaks for the r-process occur near mass numbers A = 82 (elements Se, Br, and Kr), A = 130 (elements Te, I, and Xe) and A = 196 (elements Os, Ir, and Pt). Further, all the elements heavier than bismuth, including natural thorium and uranium (and other actinides) must ultimately originate in an r-process nucleus.

The r-process entails a succession of rapid neutron captures (hence the name) by one or more heavy seed nuclei, typically beginning with nuclei in the abundance peak centered on ^{56}Fe. The captures must be rapid in the sense that the nuclei must not have time to undergo radioactive decay (typically via β^{−} decay) before another neutron arrives to be captured. This sequence can continue up to the limit of stability of the increasingly neutron-rich nuclei (the neutron drip line) to physically retain neutrons as governed by the short range nuclear force. The r-process therefore must occur in locations where there exists a high density of free neutrons. At some time following the neutron captures, the nucleus beta-decays back to the line of stability (just as with fission products) resulting in a stable isotope of the same mass number A, and normally the most neutron-rich of those.

Early studies theorized that 10^{24} free neutrons per cm^{3} would be required, for temperatures of about 1 GK, in order to match the waiting points, at which no more neutrons can be captured, with the mass numbers of the abundance peaks for r-process nuclei. This amounts to almost a gram of free neutrons in every cubic centimeter, an astonishing number requiring extreme locations. Traditionally this suggested the material ejected from the re-expanded core of a core-collapse supernova, as part of supernova nucleosynthesis, or decompression of neutron star matter thrown off by a binary neutron star merger in a kilonova. The relative contribution of each of these sources to the astrophysical abundance of r-process elements is a matter of ongoing research as of 2018.

An r-process-like series of neutron captures (on uranium-238 normally) occurs to a minor extent in thermonuclear weapon explosions, and can be enhanced by purposeful design. The elements einsteinium (element 99, A = 252) and fermium (element 100, A = 257) appear in nuclear weapon fallout, and in general this neutron capture results in isotopes as heavy as A = 257.

The r-process contrasts with the s-process, the other predominant mechanism for the production of heavy elements, which is nucleosynthesis by means of slow captures of neutrons. In general, isotopes involved in the s-process have half-lives long enough to enable their study in laboratory experiments, but this is not typically true for isotopes involved in the r-process. The s-process primarily occurs within ordinary stars, particularly AGB stars, where the neutron flux is sufficient to cause neutron captures to recur every 10–100 years, much too slow for the r-process, which requires up to 100 captures per second. The s-process is secondary, meaning that it requires pre-existing heavy isotopes as seed nuclei to be converted into other heavy nuclei by a slow sequence of captures of free neutrons. The r-process scenarios create their own seed nuclei, so they might proceed in massive stars that contain no heavy seed nuclei. Taken together, the r- and s-processes account for almost the entire abundance of chemical elements heavier than iron. The historical challenge has been to locate physical settings appropriate to their time scales.

== History ==
Following pioneering research into the Big Bang and the formation of helium in stars, an unknown process responsible for producing heavier elements found on Earth from hydrogen and helium was suspected to exist. One early attempt at explanation came from Subrahmanyan Chandrasekhar and Louis R. Henrich who postulated that elements were produced at temperatures between 6 billion and 8 billion K. Their theory accounted for elements up to chlorine, though there was no explanation for elements of atomic weight heavier than 40 amu at non-negligible abundances. This became the foundation of a study by Fred Hoyle, who hypothesized that conditions in the core of collapsing stars would enable nucleosynthesis of the remainder of the elements via rapid capture of densely packed free neutrons. However, there remained unanswered questions about equilibrium in stars that was required to balance beta-decays and precisely account for abundances of elements that would be formed in such conditions.

The need for a physical setting providing rapid neutron capture, which was known to almost certainly have a role in element formation, was also seen in a table of abundances of isotopes of heavy elements by Hans Suess and Harold Urey in 1956. Their abundance table revealed larger than average abundances of natural isotopes containing magic numbers (Note: Neutron number 50, 82 and 126) of neutrons as well as abundance peaks about 10 amu lighter than stable nuclei containing magic numbers of neutrons which were also in abundance, suggesting that radioactive neutron-rich nuclei having the magic neutron numbers but roughly ten fewer protons were formed. These observations also implied that rapid neutron capture occurred faster than beta decay, and the resulting abundance peaks were caused by so-called waiting points at magic numbers. (Note: Abundance peaks for the r- and s-processes are at A = 80, 130, 196 and A = 90, 138, 208, respectively.) This process, rapid neutron capture by neutron-rich isotopes, became known as the r-process, whereas the s-process was named for its characteristic slow neutron capture. A table apportioning the heavy isotopes between the s-process and the r-process was published in 1957 in the B^{2}FH review paper, which named the r-process and outlined the physics that guides it. Alastair G. W. Cameron also published a smaller study about the r-process in the same year.

The stationary r-process as described by the B^{2}FH paper was first demonstrated in a time-dependent calculation at Caltech by Phillip A. Seeger, William A. Fowler and Donald D. Clayton, who found that no single temporal snapshot matched the solar r-process abundances, but, that when superposed, did achieve a successful characterization of the r-process abundance distribution. Shorter-time distributions emphasize abundances at atomic weights less than A = 140, whereas longer-time distributions emphasized those at atomic weights greater than A = 140. Subsequent treatments of the r-process reinforced those temporal features. Seeger et al. were also able to construct more quantitative apportionment between s-process and r-process of the abundance table of heavy isotopes, thereby establishing a more reliable abundance curve for the r-process isotopes than B^{2}FH had been able to define. Today, the r-process abundances are determined using their technique of subtracting the more reliable s-process isotopic abundances from the total isotopic abundances and attributing the remainder to r-process nucleosynthesis. That r-process abundance curve (vs. atomic weight) has provided for many decades the target for theoretical computations of abundances synthesized by the physical r-process.

The creation of free neutrons by electron capture during the rapid collapse to high density of a supernova core along with quick assembly of some neutron-rich seed nuclei makes the r-process a primary nucleosynthesis process, a process that can occur even in a star initially of pure H and He. This in contrast to the B^{2}FH designation which is a secondary process building on preexisting iron. Primary stellar nucleosynthesis begins earlier in the galaxy than does secondary nucleosynthesis. Alternatively the high density of neutrons within neutron stars would be available for rapid assembly into r-process nuclei if a collision were to eject portions of a neutron star, which then rapidly expands freed from confinement. That sequence could also begin earlier in galactic time than would s-process nucleosynthesis; so each scenario fits the earlier growth of r-process abundances in the galaxy. Each of these scenarios is the subject of active theoretical research. Observational evidence of the early r-process enrichment of interstellar gas and of subsequent newly formed stars, as applied to the abundance evolution of the galaxy of stars, was first laid out by James W. Truran in 1981. He and subsequent astronomers showed that the pattern of heavy-element abundances in the earliest metal-poor stars matched that of the shape of the solar r-process curve, as if the s-process component were missing. This was consistent with the hypothesis that the s-process had not yet begun to enrich interstellar gas when these young stars missing the s-process abundances were born from that gas, for it requires about 100 million years of galactic history for the s-process to get started whereas the r-process can begin after two million years. These s-process–poor, r-process–rich stellar compositions must have been born earlier than any s-process, showing that the r-process emerges from quickly evolving massive stars that become supernovae and leave neutron-star remnants that can merge with another neutron star. The primary nature of the early r-process thereby derives from observed abundance spectra in old stars that had been born early, when the galactic metallicity was still small, but that nonetheless contain their complement of r-process nuclei.

Periodic table showing the cosmogenic origin of each element. The elements heavier than iron with origins in supernovae are produced by the r-process, as are those labeled merging neutron stars.

Either interpretation, though generally supported by supernova experts, has yet to achieve a totally satisfactory calculation of r-process abundances because the overall problem is numerically formidable. However, existing results are supportive; in 2017, new data about the r-process was discovered when the LIGO and Virgo gravitational-wave observatories discovered a merger of two neutron stars ejecting r-process matter. See Astrophysical sites below.

== Nuclear physics ==
The only natural candidate sites for r-process nucleosynthesis where the required conditions are thought to exist are core-collapse supernovae (including electron-capture supernovae), and now mergers of neutron stars.

Immediately after the severe compression of electrons in a Type II supernova, beta-minus decay is blocked. This is because the high electron density fills all available free electron states up to a Fermi energy which is greater than the energy of nuclear beta decay. However, nuclear capture of those free electrons still occurs, and causes increasing neutronization of matter. This results in an extremely high density of free neutrons which cannot decay, on the order of 10^{24} neutrons per cm^{3}, and high temperatures. As this re-expands and cools, neutron capture by still-existing heavy nuclei occurs much faster than beta-minus decay. As a consequence, the r-process runs up along the neutron drip line and highly-unstable neutron-rich nuclei are created.

Three processes which affect the climbing of the neutron drip line are a notable decrease in the neutron-capture cross section in nuclei with closed neutron shells, the inhibiting process of photodisintegration, and the degree of nuclear stability in the heavy-isotope region. Neutron captures in r-process nucleosynthesis leads to the formation of neutron-rich, weakly bound nuclei with neutron separation energies as low as 2 MeV. At this stage, closed neutron shells at N = 50, 82, and 126 are reached, and neutron capture is temporarily paused. These so-called waiting points are characterized by increased binding energy relative to heavier isotopes, leading to low neutron capture cross sections and a buildup of semi-magic nuclei that are more stable toward beta decay. In addition, nuclei beyond the shell closures are susceptible to quicker beta decay owing to their proximity to the drip line; for these nuclei, beta decay occurs before further neutron capture. Waiting point nuclei are then allowed to beta decay toward stability before further neutron capture can occur, resulting in a slowdown or freeze-out of the reaction.

Decreasing nuclear stability terminates the r-process when its heaviest nuclei become unstable to spontaneous fission, when the total number of nucleons approaches 270. The fission barrier may be low enough before 270 such that neutron capture might induce fission instead of continuing up the neutron drip line. After the neutron flux decreases, these highly unstable radioactive nuclei undergo a rapid succession of beta decays until they reach more stable, neutron-rich nuclei. While the s-process creates an abundance of stable nuclei having closed neutron shells, the r-process, in neutron-rich predecessor nuclei, creates an abundance of radioactive nuclei about 10 amu below the s-process peaks. These abundance peaks correspond to stable isobars produced from successive beta decays of waiting point nuclei having N = 50, 82, and 126—which are about 10 protons removed from the line of beta stability.

As mentioned, an artificial r-process can be made by nuclear explosions. It has been suggested that multiple explosions would make it possible to reach the island of stability, as the affected nuclides (starting with uranium-238 as seed nuclei) would not have time to beta decay all the way to the quickly spontaneously fissioning nuclides at the line of beta stability before absorbing more neutrons in the next explosion, thus providing a chance to reach neutron-rich superheavy nuclides like copernicium-291 and -293 which may have half-lives of centuries or millennia.

== Astrophysical sites ==
The most probable candidate site for the r-process has long been suggested to be core-collapse supernovae (spectral types Ib, Ic and II), which may provide the necessary physical conditions for the r-process. Ejected r-process material must be relatively neutron-rich, a condition which has been difficult to achieve in models, so that astrophysicists remain uneasy about their adequacy for successful r-process yields.

In 2017, new astronomical data about the r-process was discovered in data from the merger of two neutron stars. Using the gravitational wave data captured in GW170817 to identify the location of the merger, several teams observed and studied optical data of the merger, finding spectroscopic evidence of r-process material thrown off by the merging neutron stars. The bulk of this material seems to consist of two types: hot blue masses of highly radioactive r-process matter of lower-mass-range heavy nuclei (A < 140 such as strontium) and cooler red masses of higher mass-number r-process nuclei (A > 140) rich in actinides (such as uranium, thorium, and californium). When released from the huge internal pressure of the neutron star, these ejecta expand and form seed heavy nuclei that rapidly capture free neutrons, and radiate detected optical light for about a week. Such duration of luminosity would not be possible without heating by internal radioactive decay, which is provided by r-process nuclei near their waiting points. Two distinct mass regions (A < 140 and A > 140) for the r-process yields have been known since the first time dependent calculations of the r-process. Because of these spectroscopic features it has been argued that such nucleosynthesis in the Milky Way has been primarily ejecta from neutron-star mergers rather than from supernovae.

These results offer a new possibility for clarifying six decades of uncertainty over the site of origin of r-process nuclei. Confirming relevance to the r-process is that it is radiogenic power from radioactive decay of r-process nuclei that maintains the visibility of these spun off r-process fragments. Otherwise they would dim quickly. Such alternative sites were first seriously proposed in 1974 as decompressing neutron star matter. It was proposed such matter is ejected from neutron stars merging with black holes in compact binaries. In 1989 (and 1999) this scenario was extended to binary neutron star mergers (a binary star system of two neutron stars that collide). After preliminary identification of these sites, the scenario was confirmed by GW170817. Current astrophysical models suggest that a single neutron star merger event may have generated between 3 and 13 Earth masses of gold.

== See also ==
- HD 222925
- Nucleosynthesis
- s-process
- p-process
