= Spite plateau =

Baseline of stellar lithium abundance

The Spite plateau (or Spite lithium plateau) is a minimum abundance of lithium in old stars located in the stellar halo of the Milky Way galaxy, regardless of their metallicity. It is named after the astronomers François and Monique Spite, who discovered the plateau in 1982.

== Background ==
The element lithium was first produced during the Big Bang that created the observable universe. The cosmic abundance of lithium is of interest because it provides several constraints to the various Big Bang models. Those models that fail to satisfy these constraints are therefore subject to rejection or correction by the scientific community.

Lithium is readily consumed by fusion with protons at temperatures above 2×10^{6} K, such as is found in the cores of stars. Thus, if the convection zone of a main sequence star circulates a star's lithium through the core region (which is believed common in low-mass types K and M), the abundance of lithium in the star should be greatly reduced. Likewise, lithium can be produced in interstellar matter by spallation collisions with cosmic rays, or by the evolution of stars of moderate mass.

== Lithium estimates ==
To obtain a good estimate of the primordial abundance of lithium, astronomers François and Monique Spite measured the abundance of lithium in old, population II stars (or old halo stars). Such stars were formed early in the universe out of material that had not been significantly modified by other processes. Their results showed that the curve on a graph of the abundance of lithium versus effective surface temperature formed a plateau among old halo stars for effective temperatures below about:

log_{10} T_{eff} ≈ 3.75

or roughly 5,600 K. This suggested that the plateau represented the primordial abundance level of lithium in the Milky Way, and thus they were able to estimate that the abundance of lithium at the beginning of the galaxy was:

N_{Li} / N_{H} = (11.2 ± 3.8) × 10^{−11}

where N_{Li} is the number density of lithium atoms and / or ions, and

N_{H} is the number density of hydrogen atoms and / or ions.

The current estimates for the primordial abundance of lithium, as measured by this technique, are in tension with the predictions of the standard model of Big Bang nucleosynthesis, a discrepancy known as the cosmological lithium problem.
