= Oddo–Harkins rule =

Relative abundance of chemical elements

The Oddo–Harkins rule holds that an element with an even atomic number is more abundant than the elements with immediately adjacent atomic numbers. For example, carbon, with atomic number 6, is more abundant than boron (5) and nitrogen (7). Generally, the relative abundance of an even atomic numbered element is roughly two orders of magnitude greater than the relative abundances of the immediately adjacent odd atomic numbered elements to either side. This pattern was first reported by Giuseppe Oddo in 1914 and William Draper Harkins in 1917. The Oddo–Harkins rule is true for all elements beginning with carbon produced by stellar nucleosynthesis but not true for the lightest elements below carbon produced by big bang nucleosynthesis and cosmic ray spallation.

Estimated abundances of the chemical elements in the Solar System

== Definitions ==
Abundance of elements in Earth's crust per million Si atoms (y axis is logarithmic); the Oddo–Harkins rule is visible for most of the metallic elements.

All atoms heavier than hydrogen are formed in stars or supernovae through nucleosynthesis, when gravity, temperature and pressure reach levels high enough to fuse protons and neutrons together. Protons and neutrons form the atomic nucleus, which accumulates electrons to form atoms. The number of protons in the nucleus, called atomic number, uniquely identifies a chemical element.

== The rule ==
The early form of the rule derived from Harkin's 1917 study of meteorites. He reasoned, as did others at the time, that meteorites are more representative of the cosmological abundance of the elements. Harkins observed that elements with even atomic numbers (Z) were about 70 times more abundant than those with odd Z. The most common seven elements, making up almost 99% of the material in a meteorite, all had even Z. In addition, he observed that 90% of the material consisted of only 15 different isotopes, with atomic weights in multiples of four, the approximate weight of alpha particles. Three years earlier, Oddo made a similar observation for elements in the Earth's crust, speculating that elements are condensation products of helium. The nuclear core of helium is the same as an alpha particle. This early work connecting geochemistry with nuclear physics and cosmology was greatly expanded by the Norwegian group created by Victor Goldschmidt.

== Relation to stellar nucleosynthesis ==
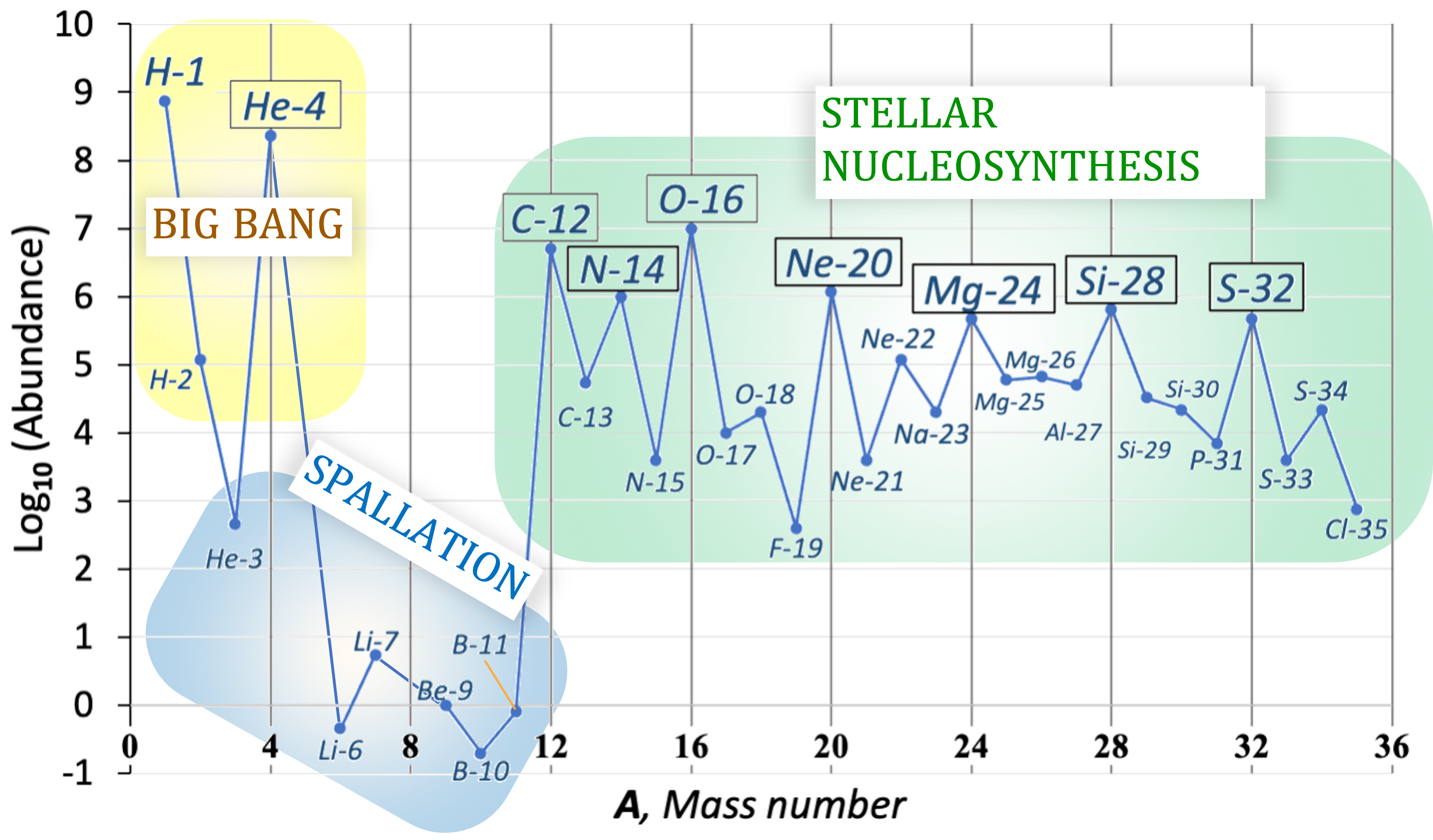
Nucleosynthetic origins of light nuclides. The most abundant nuclides have equal numbers of protons and neutrons (box around isotopic symbol). Products of cosmic-ray spallation are the least abundant.

The Oddo–Harkins rule for elements from ^{12}C to ^{56}Fe is explained by the alpha process of stellar nucleosynthesis. The process involves the fusion of alpha particles (helium-4 nuclei) under high temperature and pressure within the stellar environment. Each step in the alpha process adds two protons (and two neutrons), favoring synthesis of even-numbered elements. Carbon itself is a product of a triple-alpha process from helium, a process that skips Li, Be, and B. These nuclides (and helium-3) are produced by cosmic ray spallation – a type of nuclear fission in which cosmic rays impact larger isotopes and fragment them. Spallation does not require high temperature and pressure of the stellar environment but can occur on Earth. Though the lighter products of spallation are relatively rare, the odd-mass-number isotopes in this class occur in greater relative abundance compared to even-number isotopes, in contravention of the Oddo–Harkins rule.

== Exceptions to the rule ==
This postulate, however, does not apply to the universe's most abundant and simplest element: hydrogen, with an atomic number of 1. This may be because, in its ionized form, a hydrogen atom becomes a single proton, of which it is theorized to have been one of the first major conglomerates of quarks during the initial second of the Universe's inflation period, following the Big Bang. In this period, when inflation of the universe had brought it from an infinitesimal point to about the size of a modern galaxy, temperatures in the particle soup fell from over a trillion kelvins to several million kelvins.

This period allowed the fusion of single protons and deuterium nuclei to form helium and lithium nuclei but was too short for every H^{+} ion to be reconstituted into heavier elements. In this case, helium, atomic number 2, remains the even-numbered counterpart to hydrogen. Thus, neutral hydrogen—or hydrogen paired with an electron, the only stable lepton—constituted the vast majority of the remaining unannihilated portions of matter following the conclusion of inflation.

Another exception to the rule is beryllium, which, despite an even atomic number (4), is rarer than adjacent elements (lithium and boron). This is because most of the universe's lithium, beryllium, and boron are made by cosmic ray spallation, not ordinary stellar nucleosynthesis, and beryllium has only one stable isotope (even that is a Borromean nucleus near the boundary of stability), causing it to lag in abundance with regard to its neighbors, each of which has two stable isotopes.

== Isotopic abundance ==
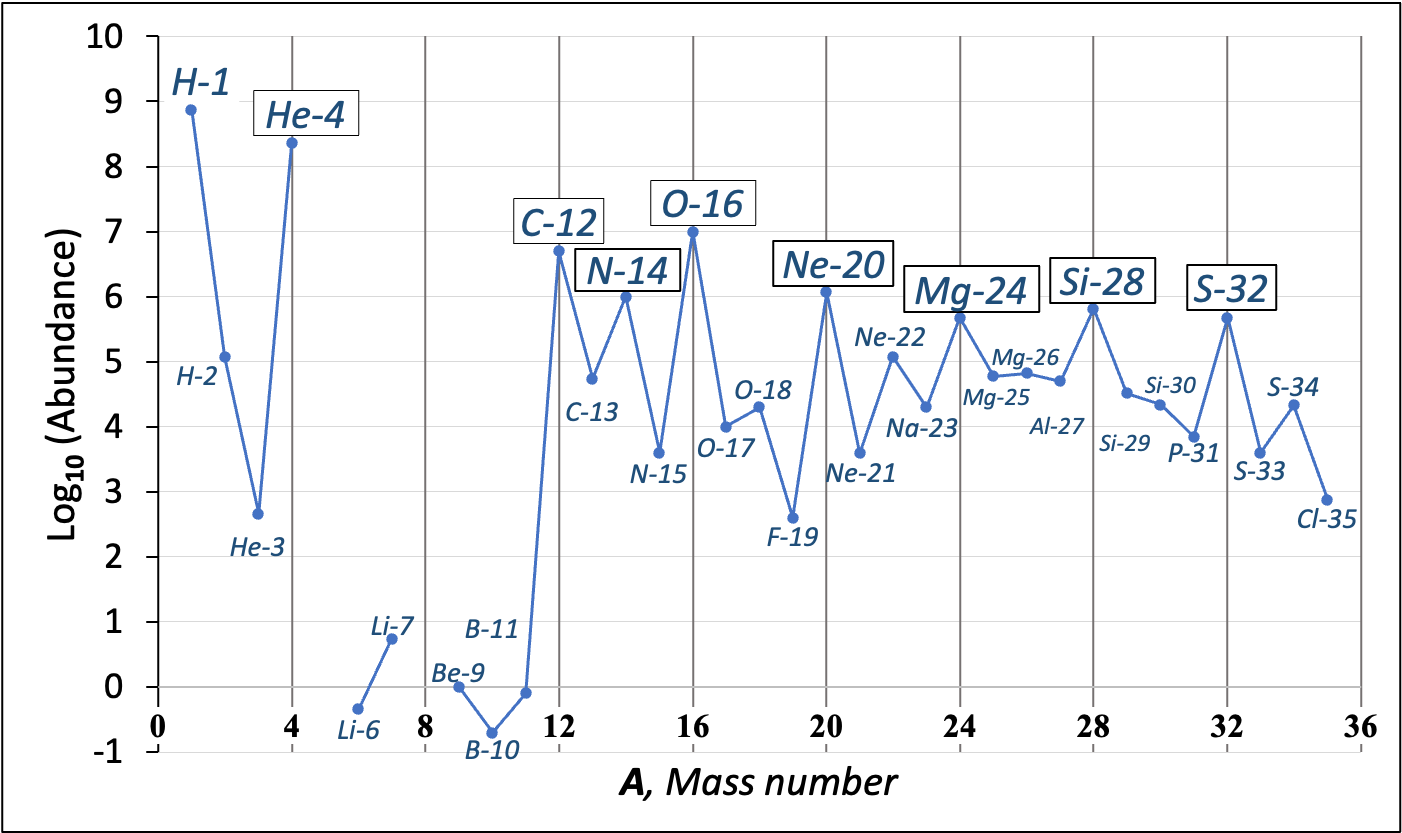
A plot of the stable isotopic compositions of the first 16 elements, which make up 99.9% of ordinary matter in the universe. Isotopes with equal numbers of protons and neutrons [boxes] are particularly abundant.

The elemental basis of the Oddo–Harkins has direct roots in the isotopic compositions of the elements. While even-atomic-numbered elements are more abundant than odd, the spirit of Oddo–Harkins rule extends to the most abundant isotopes as well. Isotopes containing an equal number of protons and neutrons are the most abundant. These include $\ce{^{4}_{2}He}$, $\ce{^{12}_{6}C}$, $\ce{^{14}_{7}N}$, $\ce{^{16}_{8}O}$, $\ce{^{20}_{10}Ne}$, $\ce{^{24}_{12}Mg}$, $\ce{^{28}_{14}Si}$, and $\ce{^{32}_{16}S}$. Seven of the eight are alpha nuclides containing whole multiples of He-4 nuclei ($\ce{^{14}_{7}N}$ is the exception). Two of the eight ($\ce{^{4}_{2}He}$ and $\ce{^{16}_{8}O}$) contain magic numbers of either protons or neutrons (2, 8, 20, 28, 50, 82, and 126) and are therefore predicted by the nuclear shell model to be unusually abundant. The high abundances of the remaining six ($\ce{^{12}_{6}C}$, $\ce{^{14}_{7}N}$, $\ce{^{20}_{10}Ne}$, $\ce{^{24}_{12}Mg}$, $\ce{^{28}_{14}Si}$, and $\ce{^{32}_{16}S}$) are not predicted by the shell model. "That nuclei of this type are unusually abundant indicates that the excess stability must have played a part in the process of the creation of elements", stated Maria Goeppert Mayer in her acceptance lecture for the Nobel Prize in Physics in 1963 for discoveries concerning nuclear shell structure.

The Oddo–Harkins rule may suggest that elements with odd atomic numbers have a single, unpaired proton and may swiftly capture another in order to achieve an even atomic number and proton parity. Protons are paired in elements with even atomic numbers, with each member of the pair balancing the spin of the other, thus enhancing nucleon stability. A challenge to this explanation is posed by $\ce{^{14}_{7}N}$, which is highly abundant in spite of having an unpaired proton. Additionally, even-parity isotopes that have exactly two more neutrons than protons are not particularly abundant despite their even parity. Each of the light elements oxygen, neon, magnesium, silicon, and sulfur, have two isotopes with even isospin (nucleon) parity. As shown in the plot above, the isotope with an equal number of protons and neutrons is one to two orders of magnitude more abundant than the isotope with even parity but two additional neutrons.

=== Relationship to fusion ===
Depending on the mass of a star, the Oddo–Harkins pattern arises from the burning of progressively more massive elements within a collapsing dying star by fusion processes such as the proton–proton chain, the CNO cycle, and the triple-alpha process. The newly formed elements are ejected slowly as stellar wind or in the explosion of a supernova and eventually join the rest of the galaxy's interstellar medium.

== See also ==
- Abundance of elements in Earth's crust
- List of elements by stability of isotopes
- Nuclear chemistry – Branch of chemistry dealing with radioactivity, transmutation and other nuclear processes
