= LO Pegasi =

Star in the constellation Pegasus

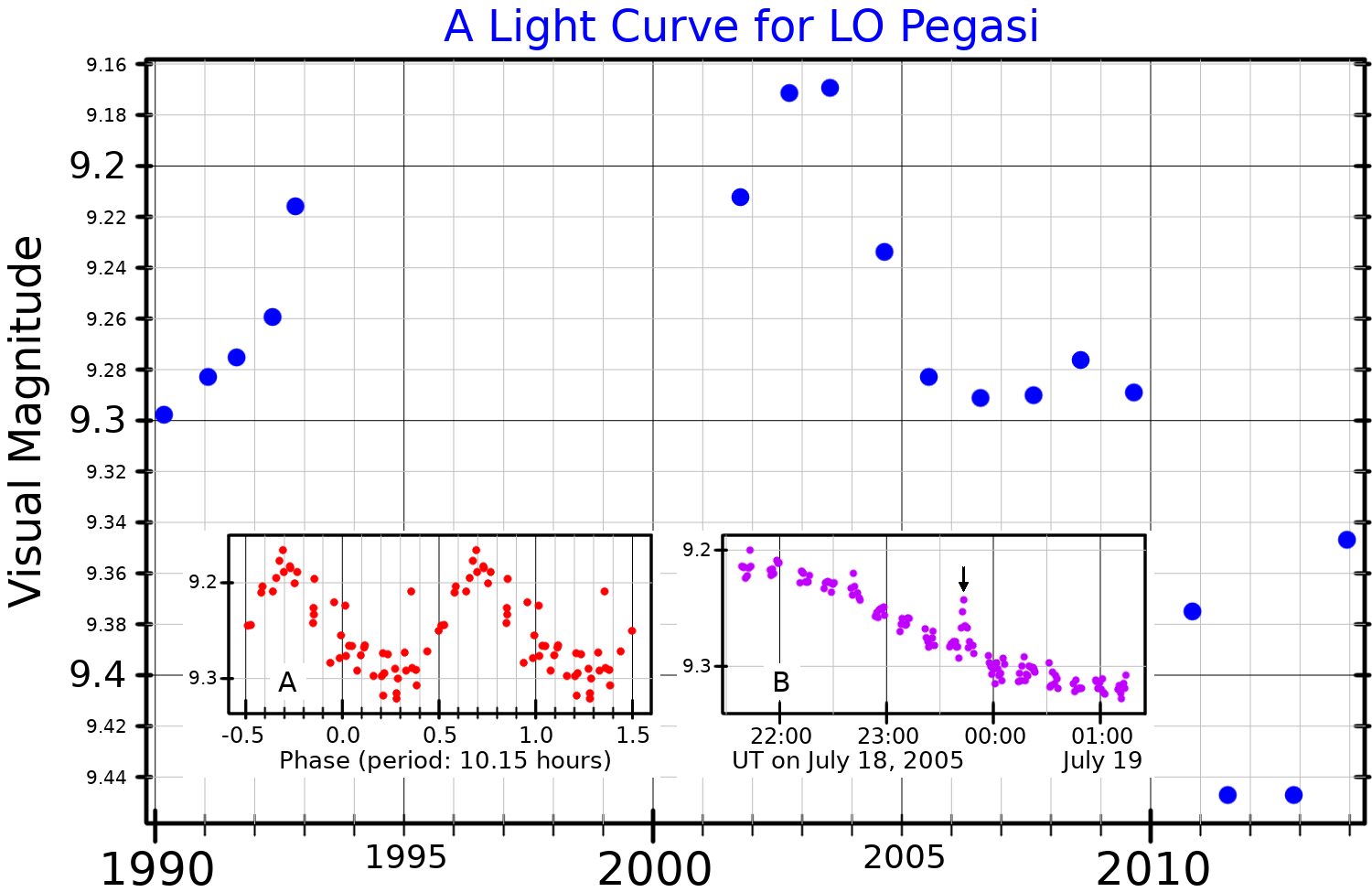
- A visual band light curve for LO Pegasi. The main plot (adapted from Karmakar et al.) shows the long-term variability. Inset plot "A" (adapted from Kiraga) shows the periodic variability, and inset "B" (also adapted from Karmakar et al.) shows a flare.

Observation data Epoch J2000.0 Equinox J2000.0
- Constellation: Pegasus
- Right ascension: 21^{h} 31^{m} 01.714^{s}
- Declination: 23° 20′ 07.37″
- Apparent magnitude (V): 9.04 to 9.27

Characteristics
- Evolutionary stage: main sequence
- Spectral type: K3Vke
- B−V color index: 1.050±0.015
- Variable type: BY Dra

Astrometry
Radial velocity (R_{v})	−23.36±1.75 km/s
Proper motion (μ)	RA: 134.654 mas/yr Dec.: −144.889 mas/yr
Parallax (π)	41.2912±0.0169 mas
Distance	78.99 ± 0.03 ly (24.218 ± 0.010 pc)
Absolute magnitude (M_{V})	7.26

Details
Mass	0.66±0.02 M_{☉}
Radius	0.72±0.10 R_{☉}
Luminosity	0.25±0.02 L_{☉}
Surface gravity (log g)	4.5±0.5 cgs
Temperature	4,750±250 K
Rotation	0.4236 d
Rotational velocity (v sin i)	48.2±2.5 km/s
Age	10–300 Myr

Other designations
- LO Peg, AG+23 2203, BD+22 4409, GJ 4199, HIP 106231, WDS J21310+2320A

Database references
SIMBAD	data

LO Pegasi is a single star in the northern constellation of Pegasus that has been the subject of numerous scientific studies. LO Pegasi, abbreviated LO Peg, is the variable star designation. It is too faint to be viewed with the naked eye, having an apparent visual magnitude that ranges from 9.04 down to 9.27. Based on parallax measurements, LO Peg is located at a distance of 79 light years from the Sun. It is a member of the young AB Doradus moving group, and is drifting closer with a radial velocity of −23 km/s.

This is a K-type main-sequence star with a stellar classification of K3Vke, where the 'k' suffix indicates interstellar absorption lines and 'e' means there are emission lines in the spectrum. It became of interest to astronomers when significant X-ray emission was detected from this star in 1994. R. D. Jeffries and associates reported flare activity based on a rotationally-broadened hydrogen α emission line and found the star varied in brightness.

LO Peg is an ultrafast rotator, completing a full rotation every 10.15 hours. It is classified as a BY Draconis variable that is magnetically active and has star spots. The combination of non-uniform surface brightness and rotation makes it appear to vary in luminosity. Up to 25.7% of the surface is covered in spots. Long term changes in periodicity suggest activity cycles, similar to the solar cycle, with periods of approximately 3 and 7.4 years. The element lithium has been detected in its atmosphere, whose abundance, in combination with the star's rapid rotation, indicates this is a young star with an age of no more than a few hundred million years.

== See also ==
- Lithium burning – Process by which lithium is spent in a star
