= Radiative levitation =

Stellar phenomenon

Radiative levitation is a phenomenon that causes heavy element abundances in the photospheres of hot stars to be much higher than solar abundance or than the expected bulk abundance. It is a type of radiation pressure acting opposite to gravity and is dependent on the opacity of the stellar material. It is often detected by misalignment of stellar atmosphere models with spectroscopically derived abundances, possibly indicating non-negligible effects. An example of radiative levitation can be seen in the spectrum of the B-type star Feige 86, which has gold and platinum abundances three to ten thousand times higher than solar norms.

Metals and other heavy elements have large photon absorption cross-sections when partially ionized, so they efficiently absorb radiation from fusion processes within the stellar core. Some of this photon energy gets converted to outward momentum, exerting an outward pressure on the ion by effectively 'kicking' it towards the photosphere. The effect is strong enough that very hot white dwarfs are significantly less bright in the EUV and X-ray bands than would be expected from a black-body model due to this additional absorption. Radiative levitation is also prevalent in hot massive stars, where these processes can excite the resonant modes of stars and affect their evolution, likely leading to stellar pulsations in certain stars.

The countervailing process is gravitational settling, where large gravitational fields overcome the effects of diffusion and radiative levitation causing the denser heavy elements to sink rapidly into the star, rendering them unobservable to spectroscopic methods.

== See also ==
- Chemically peculiar star
