= Abundance of elements in Earth's crust =

The abundance of elements in Earth's crust is shown in tabulated form with the estimated crustal abundance for each chemical element shown as mg/kg, or parts per million (ppm) by mass (10,000 ppm = 1%).

== Reservoirs ==
The Earth's crust is one "reservoir" for measurements of abundance. A reservoir is any large body to be studied as unit, like the ocean, atmosphere, mantle or crust. Different reservoirs may have different relative amounts of each element due to different chemical or mechanical processes involved in the creation of the reservoir.

== Difficulties in measurement ==
Estimates of elemental abundance are difficult because (a) the composition of the upper and lower crust are quite different, and (b) the composition of the continental crust can vary drastically by locality. The composition of the Earth changed after its formation due to loss of volatile compounds, melting and recrystalization, selective loss of some elements to the deep interior, and erosion by water. The lanthanides are especially difficult to measure accurately.

== Graphs of abundance vs atomic number ==
Abundance (atom fraction) of the chemical elements in Earth's upper continental crust as a function of atomic number; siderophiles shown in yellow

Graphs of abundance against atomic number can reveal patterns relating abundance to stellar nucleosynthesis and geochemistry. The alternation of abundance between even and odd atomic number is known as the Oddo–Harkins rule. The rarest elements in the crust are not the heaviest, but are rather the siderophile elements (iron-loving) in the Goldschmidt classification of elements. These have been depleted by being relocated deeper into the Earth's core; their abundance in meteoroids is higher. Tellurium and selenium are concentrated as sulfides in the core and have also been depleted by preaccretional sorting in the nebula that caused them to form volatile hydrogen selenide and hydrogen telluride.

== List of abundance by element ==
This table gives the estimated abundance in parts per million by mass of elements in the continental crust; values of the less abundant elements may vary with location by several orders of magnitude.

Colour indicates each element's Goldschmidt classification:
Lithophile	Siderophile	Atmophile	Chalcophile	Trace

Abundance of chemical elements in Earth's (continental) crust, by mass
Most to Least	Z	Element	Symbol	Goldschmidt classification	Abundance (ppm)	Extraction tonnes/year
1.	8	oxygen	O	Lithophile	461,000 (46.1%)	10,335,000
2.	14	silicon	Si	Lithophile	282,000 (28.2%)	7,200,000
3.	13	aluminium	Al	Lithophile	82,300 (8.23%)	57,600,000
4.	26	iron	Fe	Siderophile	56,300 (5.63%)	1,150,000,000
5.	20	calcium	Ca	Lithophile	41,500 (4.15%)	18,000
6.	11	sodium	Na	Lithophile	23,600 (2.36%)	255,000,000
7.	12	magnesium	Mg	Lithophile	23,300 (2.33%)	27,700,000
8.	19	potassium	K	Lithophile	20,900 (2.09%)	53,200,000
9.	22	titanium	Ti	Lithophile	5,650 (0.565%)	6,600,000
10.	1	hydrogen	H	Atmophile	1,400 (0.14%)	75,000,000
11.	15	phosphorus	P	Lithophile	1,050 (0.105%)	226,000,000
12.	25	manganese	Mn	Lithophile	950 (0.095%)	16,000,000
13.	9	fluorine	F	Lithophile	585 (0.0585%)	17,000
14.	56	barium	Ba	Lithophile	425 (0.0425%)	6,000,000
15.	38	strontium	Sr	Lithophile	370 (0.037%)	350,000
16.	16	sulfur	S	Chalcophile	350 (0.035%)	69,300,000
17.	6	carbon	C	Atmophile	200 (0.02%)	9,700,000,000
18.	40	zirconium	Zr	Lithophile	165 (0.0165%)	1,460,000
19.	17	chlorine	Cl	Lithophile	145 (0.0145%)	71,250,000
20.	23	vanadium	V	Lithophile	120 (0.012%)	76,000
21.	24	chromium	Cr	Lithophile	102 (0.0102%)	26,000,000
22.	37	rubidium	Rb	Lithophile	90 (0.009%)	2
23.	28	nickel	Ni	Siderophile	84 (0.0084%)	2,250,000
24.	30	zinc	Zn	Chalcophile	70 (0.007%)	11,900,000
25.	58	cerium	Ce	Lithophile	66.5 (0.00665%)	24,000
26.	29	copper	Cu	Chalcophile	60 (0.006%)	19,400,000
27.	60	neodymium	Nd	Lithophile	41.5 (0.00415%)	7,000
28.	57	lanthanum	La	Lithophile	39 (0.0039%)	12,500
29.	39	yttrium	Y	Lithophile	33 (0.0033%)	6,000
30.	27	cobalt	Co	Siderophile	25 (0.0025%)	123,000
31.	21	scandium	Sc	Lithophile	22 (0.0022%)	14
32.	3	lithium	Li	Lithophile	20 (0.002%)	35,000
33.	41	niobium	Nb	Lithophile	20 (0.002%)	64,000
34.	7	nitrogen	N	Atmophile	19 (0.0019%)	140,000,000
35.	31	gallium	Ga	Chalcophile	19 (0.0019%)	315
36.	82	lead	Pb	Chalcophile	14 (0.0014%)	4,820,000
37.	5	boron	B	Lithophile	10 (0.001%)	9,400,000
38.	90	thorium	Th	Lithophile	9.6 (0.00096%)	5,000
39.	59	praseodymium	Pr	Lithophile	9.2 (0.00092%)	2,500
40.	62	samarium	Sm	Lithophile	7.05 (0.000705%)	700
41.	64	gadolinium	Gd	Lithophile	6.2 (0.00062%)	400
42.	66	dysprosium	Dy	Lithophile	5.2 (0.00052%)	0.2
43.	68	erbium	Er	Lithophile	3.5 (0.00035%)	500
44.	18	argon	Ar	Atmophile	3.5 (0.00035%)	
45.	70	ytterbium	Yb	Lithophile	3.2 (0.00032%)	
46.	72	hafnium	Hf	Lithophile	3.0 (0.0003%)	35
47.	55	caesium	Cs	Lithophile	3.0 (0.0003%)	
48.	4	beryllium	Be	Lithophile	2.8 (0.00028%)	220
49.	92	uranium	U	Lithophile	2.7 (0.00027%)	74,119
50.	35	bromine	Br	Lithophile	2.4 (0.00024%)	391,000
51.	50	tin	Sn	Chalcophile	2.3 (0.00023%)	280,000
52.	73	tantalum	Ta	Lithophile	2.0 (0.0002%)	1,100
53.	63	europium	Eu	Lithophile	2.0 (0.0002%)	35.8
54.	33	arsenic	As	Chalcophile	1.8 (0.00018%)	36,500
55.	32	germanium	Ge	Chalcophile	1.5 (0.00015%)	155
56.	67	holmium	Ho	Lithophile	1.3 (0.00013%)	
57.	74	tungsten	W	Siderophile	1.25 (0.000125%)	86,400
58.	42	molybdenum	Mo	Siderophile	1.2 (0.00012%)	227,000
59.	65	terbium	Tb	Lithophile	1.2 (0.00012%)	
60.	81	thallium	Tl	Chalcophile	0.85 (8.5×10^{−5}%)	10
61.	71	lutetium	Lu	Lithophile	0.8 (8×10^{−5}%)	
62.	69	thulium	Tm	Lithophile	0.52 (5.2×10^{−5}%)	
63.	53	iodine	I	Lithophile	0.45 (4.5×10^{−5}%)	31,600
64.	49	indium	In	Chalcophile	0.25 (2.5×10^{−5}%)	655
65.	51	antimony	Sb	Chalcophile	0.2 (2×10^{−5}%)	130,000
66.	48	cadmium	Cd	Chalcophile	0.15 (1.5×10^{−5}%)	23,000
67.	80	mercury	Hg	Chalcophile	0.085 (8.5×10^{−6}%)	4,500
68.	47	silver	Ag	Chalcophile	0.075 (7.5×10^{−6}%)	27,000
69.	34	selenium	Se	Chalcophile	0.05 (5×10^{−6}%)	2,200
70.	46	palladium	Pd	Siderophile	0.015 (1.5×10^{−6}%)	208
71.	83	bismuth	Bi	Chalcophile	0.0085 (8.5×10^{−7}%)	10,200
72.	2	helium	He	Atmophile	0.008 (8×10^{−7}%)	
73.	10	neon	Ne	Atmophile	0.005 (5×10^{−7}%)	
74.	78	platinum	Pt	Siderophile	0.005 (5×10^{−7}%)	172
75.	79	gold	Au	Siderophile	0.004 (4×10^{−7}%)	3,100
76.	76	osmium	Os	Siderophile	0.0015 (1.5×10^{−7}%)	
77.	52	tellurium	Te	Chalcophile	0.001 (1×10^{−7}%)	2,200
78.	44	ruthenium	Ru	Siderophile	0.001 (1×10^{−7}%)	30
79.	77	iridium	Ir	Siderophile	0.001 (1×10^{−7}%)	7.3
80.	45	rhodium	Rh	Siderophile	0.001 (1×10^{−7}%)	30
81.	75	rhenium	Re	Siderophile	0.0007 (7×10^{−8}%)	47.2
82.	36	krypton	Kr	Atmophile	0.0001 (1×10^{−8}%)	
83.	54	xenon	Xe	Atmophile	3×10^{−5} (3×10^{−9}%)	
84.	91	protactinium	Pa	trace	1.4×10^{−6} (1.4×10^{−10}%)	
85.	88	radium	Ra	trace	9×10^{−7} (9×10^{−11}%)	
86.	89	actinium	Ac	trace	5.5×10^{−10} (6×10^{−14}%)	
87.	84	polonium	Po	trace	2×10^{−10} (2×10^{−14}%)	
88.	86	radon	Rn	trace	4×10^{−13} (4×10^{−17}%)	
89.	43	technetium	Tc	trace	3×10^{−15} (3×10^{−19}%)	
90.	61	promethium	Pm	trace	2×10^{−23} (2×10^{−25}%)|	
91.	87	francium	Fr	trace	1×10^{−24} (1×10^{−26}%)|	
92.	85	astatine	At	trace	3×10^{−27} (3×10^{−29}%)|	
93.	94	plutonium	Pu	trace		
94.	93	neptunium	Np	trace		

== See also ==
- Abundance of the chemical elements
- Abundances of the elements (data page)
- Atmospheric chemistry – Branch of atmospheric science in which the chemistry of the atmosphere is studied
- Clarke number – Relative abundance of elements
- List of chemical elements
- Natural nuclear fission reactor – Naturally occurring uranium self-sustaining nuclear chain reactions
- Primordial nuclide – Nuclides predating the Earth's formation (found on Earth)
