= Big Bang nucleosynthesis =

Process during the early universe

In physical cosmology, Big Bang nucleosynthesis (also known as primordial nucleosynthesis, and abbreviated as BBN) is a model for the production of light nuclei (including, but not limited to, ^{2}H, ^{3}He, ^{4}He, and ^{7}Li) during the first ~20 minutes of the evolution of the universe. The predictions of BBN rely on a combination of thermodynamic arguments and measurements of rates of nuclear reactions that are expected to be active in the early universe. Refined models tend to agree well with observations of these light element abundances. The model is one of the key concepts in standard cosmology.

Elements heavier than lithium are instead created in appreciable amounts at later times via stellar nucleosynthesis, through the formation, evolution and death of stars.

== History ==
The history of Big Bang nucleosynthesis research began with George Gamow, a nuclear physicist who thought that Victor Goldschmidt's data on the abundance of elements in the universe might be predicted by nuclear reactions. Early in the 1940s Gamow realized that very high temperatures and pressures needed for nuclear reactions implied an explosion followed by expansion. Calculations by his student Ralph Alpher, published in the famous Alpher–Bethe–Gamow paper, outlined an early theory of light-element production in the early universe. These early efforts did not involve specific nuclear reactions. When Enrico Fermi and Anthony L. Turkevich tried, they found they would predict hydrogen and helium, but no higher elements. The key problem was a "mass gap": there are no nuclei with masses of 5 and 8 atomic mass units needed for the reactions to reach higher masses. In 1953 this problem seemed insurmountable and cast doubt on the entire concept.

The competing cosmological model, the steady state model, appearing in two 1948 publications by Fred Hoyle and by Herman Bondi and Thomas Gold, had no mass-gap issue because it ignored nuclear processes initially. In 1957, Hoyle teamed up with Margaret Burbidge, Geoffrey Burbidge, William A. Fowler to develop a detailed model of nucleosynthesis in stars. This theory matched the abundance of almost all of the elements except for hydrogen and helium, the elements correctly predicted by the Big Bang theory.

The discovery of the cosmic microwave background radiation in 1965 strongly supported the Big Bang theory and it also allowed Jim Peebles to use the estimated background temperature, 3K, in the first detailed calculations of the primordial isotopic abundances, showing a He abundance between 26 and 28%. The following year Hoyle, Fowler, and Robert Wagoner showed that the very light elements like He require higher temperatures than stars provide, evidence that most scientists took as support for the Big Bang model.

In 1972 the Copernicus satellite began to provide accurate measurements of deuterium abundance. Since primordial synthesis of deuterium depends more strongly on baryon density than does synthesis of ^{3}He, the deuterium abundance could be used to infer primordial density. By the 1990s additional measurements concluded that this density implied there must be mass other than baryons in the universe, an idea that came to be called dark matter.

These nucleosynthesis methods have been refined over the years using updated estimates of the input nuclear reaction rates. The first systematic Monte Carlo study of how nuclear reaction rate uncertainties impact isotope predictions, over the relevant temperature range, was carried out in 1993.

== Physical description ==
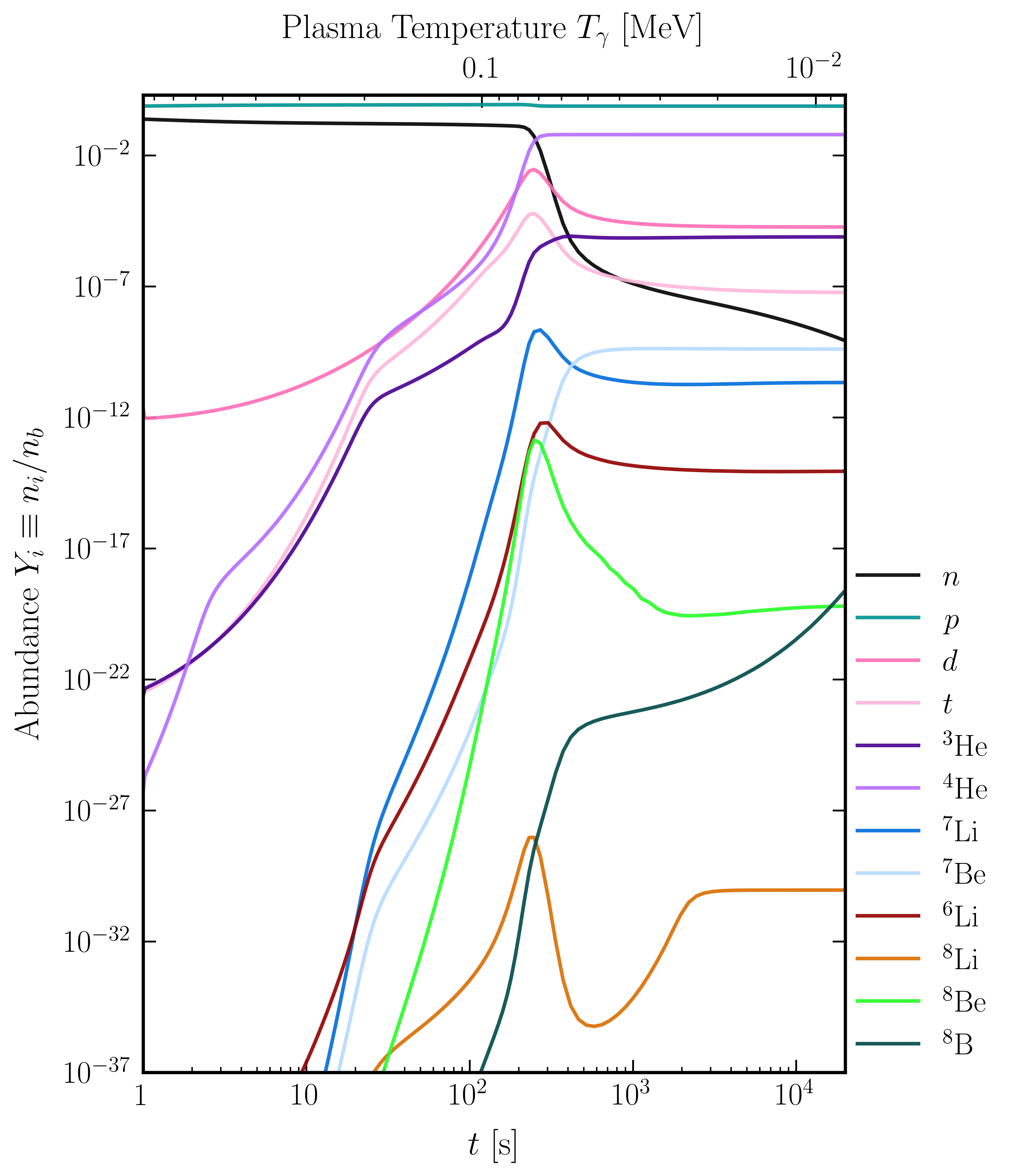
The abundances of light element nuclei during Big Bang nucleosynthesis, as a function of time since the Big Bang in seconds (lower axis) or the Standard Model plasma temperature in MeV. The y-axis shows the abundance as a number density of each individual species divided by the number density of baryons.

Big Bang nucleosynthesis describes the production of atomic nuclei from protons and neutrons in the expanding and cooling early universe. The process occurs at equilibrium with protons and neutrons combining to create nuclei and the nuclei disintegrating. As the temperature and pressure drop, equilibrium shifts to favor a few light element nuclei. Further expansion stops the BBN processes, setting the initial cosmic abundance of these elements.

The cosmic expansion process during BBN is described by the Friedmann–Robertson–Walker model. These equations completely determine the rate of expansion of the universe, as well as the evolution of the energy densities of different particle species. In particular, these equations indicate that the universe becomes less dense and the temperature of particles in the Standard Model falls as BBN proceeds.

At temperatures above 1–2 MeV, protons and neutrons interconverted via the weak interaction. As the temperature dropped, these reactions fell out of equilibrium, neutrons primarily decayed to protons, and the neutron-to-proton ratio fell to around 1/7. This sets the initial conditions for the onset of the formation of light nuclei.

BBN began in earnest when the temperature of Standard Model particles dropped below roughly 1 MeV. At this temperature, the average energy of photons in the early universe was too low to break apart deuterium as it formed, but the universe remained hot and dense enough for fusion reactions to occur at a significant rate. This meant that a substantial population of deuterium formed.

This deuterium then fused to heavier nuclei, including tritium, helium-3, helium-4, and lithium-7. Helium-4 has a large binding energy, which means that once a helium-4 nucleus is formed, it is difficult to break apart and incorporate its constituents into heavier nuclei. As a result of this, matter in the universe after BBN is primarily hydrogen and helium. Standard BBN predicts, by the time BBN ends, the universe is composed of about 75% of hydrogen and 25% helium-4 by mass. Roughly 1 nucleus in 100,000 is deuterium or helium-3, and 1 nucleus in 1,000,000,000 is lithium-7. Even smaller amounts of heavier elements, as heavy as oxygen-20, have been predicted to form.

BBN coincides or nearly coincides with two other important events in cosmology. Neutrino decoupling occurred when the weak interaction fell out of equilibrium, just before BBN began. Electron–positron annihilation occurred during BBN, at around 0.5 MeV, when photons no longer had enough energy to convert back to electrons and positrons to maintain equilibrium. This resulted in the depletion of the abundance of positrons in the universe, and heated photons. Since electron–positron annihilation occurred after neutrino decoupling, neutrinos did not heat alongside photons when electrons and positrons annihilated, and photons developed a separate temperature from neutrinos. This has important consequences for the rates of proton–neutron interconversion and the prediction of light element abundances.

== Determination of light element abundances ==
=== Important parameters ===
The creation of light elements during BBN was dependent on nuclear reaction rate parameters and two cosmological input parameters neutron–proton ratio (calculable from Standard Model physics) and the baryon-photon ratio. The nuclear reaction rates are well-known from detailed laboratory studies at similar temperatures to those that appear in BBN.

==== Baryon-to-photon ratio ====
The evolution of different light element abundances for different values of the baryon-to-photon ratio η. Note the final abundances (values at the latest times) can vary dramatically depending on the value of this parameter.

Light element abundances, and in particular deuterium, are sensitive to the value of the baryon-to-photon number ratio, η, which is the ratio of the number density of baryons to the number density of photons. Its value is small, at roughly 6 × 10^{−10}. This parameter is proportional to the baryon density and controls the entropy of the universe, which in turn determines the temperature at which nuclear fusion can begin. High entropy prevents light element nuclei from forming, which delays the onset of BBN; low entropy conversely lets BBN last longer, and therefore depletes the abundances of light elements that can fuse into helium-4.

Deuterium in particular is extremely sensitive to the value of the baryon-to-photon ratio; decreasing η by a factor of 10 leads to a corresponding increase in the abundance of primordial deuterium by a factor of roughly 50.

==== Expansion rate ====
Particles and nuclei fall out of equilibrium when their rates of interaction become slower than the rate of the expansion of the universe. If the rate keeping a nuclear species in equilibrium drops below the expansion rate, the relative abundance of that species stops evolving (or decreases if decay is possible).

During BBN, the universe is radiation dominated, and so the expansion of the universe is primarily determined by the energy density in radiative species like photons and neutrinos. Light element abundances are therefore sensitive to the energy densities of these species.

=== Sequence of nucleosynthesis ===
Main nuclear reaction chains for Big Bang nucleosynthesis

BBN begins shortly after neutrinos decouple from the Standard Model and processes interconverting protons and neutrons fall out of equilibrium. By roughly 20 seconds after the Big Bang, the universe had cooled sufficiently to allow deuterium nuclei to survive disruption by high-energy photons. At this time, there were about six protons for every neutron.

As the universe expanded and cooled, other light elements began to form, becoming heavier through nuclear fusion. At temperatures below 0.3 MeV, conditions were right for helium-4 to form, and below 0.1 MeV the abundance of deuterium climbed high enough for a burst of element formation. However, very shortly thereafter, around twenty minutes after the Big Bang, the temperature and density became too low for any significant fusion to occur. At this point, the elemental abundances were nearly fixed. Further changes were the result of the radioactive decay of the two major unstable products of BBN, tritium and beryllium-7, as well as continued decay of neutrons that did not fuse into any nuclei. At the end of nucleosynthesis there were about seven protons to every neutron, and almost all the neutrons were in Helium-4 nuclei.

==== Neutron–proton interconversion ====
At temperatures above roughly 2 MeV (roughly 1 second to 1 minute after the Big Bang), protons and neutrons interconverted via reactions involving electrons, positrons, neutrinos, and antineutrinos:

$$\ce{n \ + e+ <=> \overline{\nu}_e + p}$$
$$\ce{n \ + \nu_{e} <=> p + e-}$$

At times much earlier than 1 second, these reactions were fast and maintained a neutron/proton ratio close to 1. Neutrons are slightly heavier than protons, so even though these rates remained in equilibrium as the temperature began to drop, equilibrium shifted in favor of protons and the neutron/proton ratio smoothly decreased. Around a temperature of 2 MeV, these reactions fell out of equilibrium as neutrinos decoupled from the rest of the Standard Model. After this time, interconversion between protons and neutrons became inefficient, and the neutron-proton ratio was fixed to about 1/6.

However, this fraction continued to evolve during BBN, since free neutrons are unstable with a lifetime of about 15 minutes. Had nucleosynthesis not occurred, this ratio would have fallen to 0, but since neutrons are usually stable when bound in nuclei, the neutron/proton ratio settles to about 1/7 by the end of BBN. Virtually all of these remaining neutrons are therefore incorporated into nuclei at the end of BBN.

==== Deuterium ====
Deuterium is the first nucleus to fuse during BBN. Its formation is the first step in all reaction chains to synthesize heavier elements. It has a small binding energy, meaning it is generally easy to break deuterium nuclei apart and incorporate them into heavier nuclei. For example, to fuse tritium, a deuterium nucleus breaks when it encounters another deuterium nucleus, and the neutron from the first nucleus is incorporated into the second. This process is efficient because the deuterium binding energy is low.

The deuterium abundance climbs steadily during BBN until temperatures lower than about 0.1 MeV. After that, deuterium fusion becomes inefficient due to the decreasing temperature and density of the universe. BBN proceeds for a time as the remaining deuterium is fused into heavier nuclei, but eventually those processes become inefficient as well and a tiny abundance of deuterium (roughly one out of every 100,000 nuclei) remains.

==== Tritium, helium-3, and helium-4 ====
Tritium and helium-3 form next, when the deuterium abundance is large enough that deuterium fuses efficiently. Helium-4 forms quickly thereafter, reaching an appreciable abundance roughly 10 seconds after the Big Bang, and quickly surpassing the deuterium abundance thereafter as deuterium is consumed to make heavier elements. Helium-4 has a very large binding energy compared to all other nuclei of similar atomic weight. Unlike deuterium, processes that require fusing helium-4 nuclei with other nuclei are therefore inefficient. Further, the absence of a stable nucleus with 5 or 8 nucleons means it is impossible to fuse helium-4 with helium-4, or helium-4 with protons, the two most abundant nuclei in the universe.

The helium-4 abundance closely tracks the neutron abundance. Neutrons that did not decay during BBN are very likely to be in a helium-4 nucleus, since helium-4 must be formed on the way to heavier elements and incorporating additional nucleons requires significant energy. The neutron/proton ratio alone is sufficient to estimate that about 8% of all atoms should be helium-4, leading to a mass fraction of helium-4 of about 25%. This estimate is in accordance with observations.

==== Heavier elements ====
A version of the periodic table indicating the origins – including big bang nucleosynthesis – of the elements. All elements above 103 (lawrencium) are also man-made and are not included.

Trace amounts of elements heavier than helium-4 also form during BBN. These abundances are suppressed tightly—bound helium-4 must be produced and then broken apart in order to form heavier nuclei. Elements heavier than helium-4 are instead primarily produced in stars, where this bottleneck is overcome via triple collisions of helium-4 nuclei, producing carbon (the triple-alpha process). This process is too slow to be relevant during BBN's 20-minute duration.

Precise numerical codes make predictions for the abundances of heavy elements as heavy as oxygen. These form sequentially during BBN, in reactions involving lighter nuclei that formed prior.

=== Measurements of primordial abundances ===
In order to test the predictions of BBN, astrophysicists make precise measurements of light element abundances in the universe. These measurements are complicated by the fact that stars change the relative abundances of hydrogen, deuterium, helium-3, helium-4, and heavier elements as the universe evolves. Therefore, measurements of primordial element abundances are taken in metal-poor systems, where contamination from stellar nucleosynthesis is expected to be low.

Measurements of primordial deuterium involve measuring absorption spectra from metal-poor clouds of gas passing in front of bright, distant quasars. Measurements of primordial helium-4 involve measuring helium-4 recombination lines, emitted when an electron and ionized helium-4 combine back into a neutral atom, in metal-poor dwarf galaxies. These two isotopes have each been measured to percent-level precision. The observed abundance of each of these nuclei is generally consistent with the abundances predicted by BBN.

There are also measurements of primordial lithium-7, both in stars and in the interstellar medium. In the 1980s, measurements of Population II dwarf stars appeared to have similar abundances of lithium, despite having different metallicities. This result, called the Spite plateau, was thought to coincide with the primordial lithium-7 abundance. However, more recent measurements of lower-metallicity stars have found a smaller lithium abundance, raising questions about the assumption that the abundance of lithium-7 on the Spite plateau is primordial. The resulting measurement of primordial lithium-7 is a factor of 2–4 lower than the predicted BBN abundance, a discrepancy known as the cosmological lithium problem, though there remain open questions about the Spite plateau and the reliability of these measurements.

Finally, there is an observational upper bound on the abundance of primordial helium-3. Primordial helium-3 is difficult to measure because systems are easily contaminated by nearby stellar activity, and measurements can vary widely with no clear correlation to metallicity or location of the system being measured. Therefore only an upper bound can be reported from observation (as contamination should increase the amount of helium-3 in the system), though it is not often used in precision analyses.

== Significance ==
=== For standard cosmology ===
BBN provides a direct measurement of the baryon-to-photon ratio, one of the six parameters in the Lambda-CDM model of cosmology. Deuterium in particular is extraordinarily sensitive to the value of this parameter; the baryon-to-photon ratio is determined by calculating the value of η that produces a prediction of the deuterium abundance that matches the measured abundance. Recent work uses BBN to determine the baryon-to-photon ratio with an uncertainty of 1%.

The baryon-to-photon ratio can also be inferred from the cosmic microwave background (CMB). BBN and the formation of the CMB are separated by roughly 400,000 years of evolution; they are two independent epochs in cosmology, and yet the Lambda-CDM model of cosmology requires they share the same value of the baryon-to-photon ratio. Concordance between these epochs is observed, and so Lambda-CDM passes this consistency test.

Fitting the six parameters of Lambda-CDM to observed data from CMB experiments also requires knowledge of the primordial helium-4 abundance. While in some analyses this parameter is inferred from CMB data, state-of-the-art inference of the parameters of Lambda-CDM requires input from BBN.

The BBN determination of the baryon-to-photon ratio is also used in analyses of baryon acoustic oscillation (BAO) data. BAO is sensitive to the baryon-to-photon ratio, and in so in analyses where independence from the CMB is desired, the BBN determination of this parameter is used during data analysis.

=== For new physics ===
BBN is often used to constrain particle physics scenarios beyond the Standard Model, including dark matter scenarios, massive neutrinos, and other particles or phenomena not included in the Standard Model.

BBN takes place near temperatures of 1 MeV, and therefore is sensitive to processes that are characterized by a similar energy scale. In standard cosmology, this includes neutrino decoupling and electron–positron annihilation. Scenarios that include, for example, energy injections from exotic particles into the Standard Model plasma around the same temperature, can also be probed with BBN, as these new processes change the predictions for primordial element abundances. Other scenarios, including time-varying fundamental constants or scenarios with new light particles, can be probed in much the same way.

== See also ==
- Big Bang
- Chronology of the universe
- Nucleosynthesis
- Relic abundance
- Stellar nucleosynthesis
- Cosmological lithium problem
