= Cosmological lithium problem =

Problem in astronomy

In astronomy, the lithium problem or lithium discrepancy refers to the discrepancy between the primordial abundance of lithium as inferred from observations of metal-poor (Population II) halo stars in our galaxy and the amount that should theoretically exist due to Big Bang nucleosynthesis (BBN). The Big Bang nucleosynthesis and WMAP constitute cosmic baryon density predictions of the cosmic microwave background (CMB); namely, the most widely accepted models of the Big Bang suggest that three times as much primordial lithium, in particular lithium-7, should exist. This contrasts with the observed abundance of isotopes of hydrogen (^{1}H and ^{2}H) and helium (^{3}He and ^{4}He) that are consistent with predictions. The discrepancy is highlighted in a so-called "Schramm plot", named in honor of astrophysicist David Schramm, which depicts these primordial abundances as a function of cosmic baryon content from standard BBN predictions.

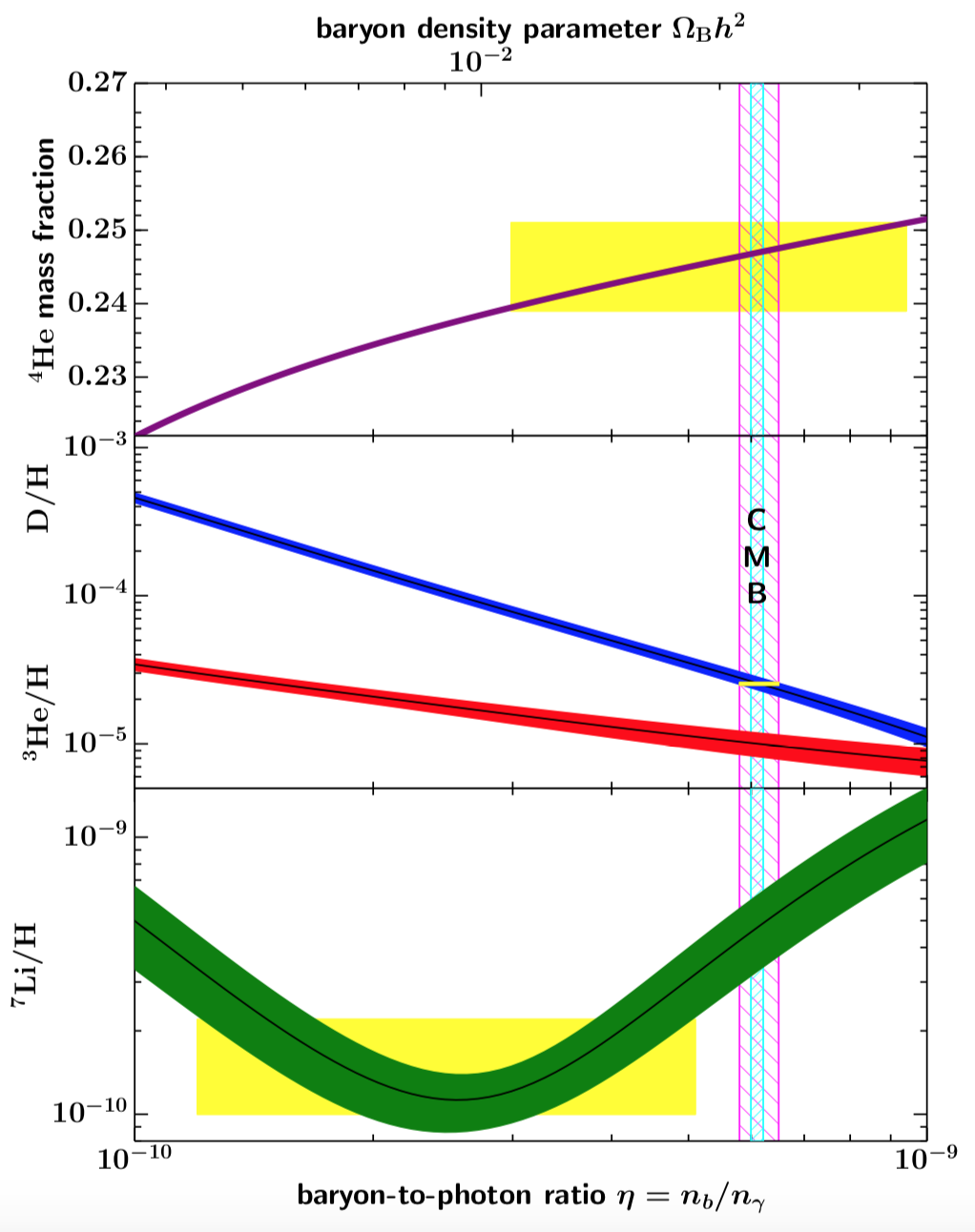
This "Schramm plot" depicts primordial abundances of ^{4}He, D, ^{3}He, and ^{7}Li as a function of cosmic baryon content from standard BBN predictions. CMB predictions of ^{7}Li (narrow vertical bands, at 95% CL) and the BBN D + ^{4}He concordance range (wider vertical bands, at 95% CL) should overlap with the observed light element abundances (yellow boxes) to be in agreement. This occurs in ^{4}He and is well constrained in D, but is not the case for ^{7}Li, where the observed Li observations lie a factor of 3−4 below the BBN+WMAP prediction.

== Origin of lithium ==
Minutes after the Big Bang, the universe was made almost entirely of hydrogen and helium, with trace amounts of lithium and beryllium, and negligibly small abundances of all heavier elements.

=== Lithium synthesis in the Big Bang ===
Big Bang nucleosynthesis produced both lithium-7 and beryllium-7, and indeed the latter dominates the primordial synthesis of mass 7 nuclides. On the other hand, the Big Bang produced lithium-6 at levels more than 1000 times smaller. ^{7}_{4}Be later decayed via electron capture (half-life 53.22 days) into ^{7}_{3}Li, so that the observable primordial lithium abundance essentially sums primordial ^{7}_{3}Li and radiogenic lithium from the decay of ^{7}_{4}Be.

These isotopes are produced by the reactions

^{3}_{1}H	+	^{4}_{2}He	→	^{7}_{3}Li	+	γ
^{3}_{2}He	+	^{4}_{2}He	→	^{7}_{4}Be	+	γ

and destroyed by

^{7}_{4}Be	+	n	→	^{7}_{3}Li	+	p
^{7}_{3}Li	+	p	→	^{4}_{2}He	+	^{4}_{2}He

The amount of lithium generated in the Big Bang can be calculated. Hydrogen-1 is the most abundant nuclide, comprising roughly 92% of the atoms in the Universe, with helium-4 second at 8%. Other isotopes including ^{2}H, ^{3}H, ^{3}He, ^{6}Li, ^{7}Li, and ^{7}Be are much rarer; the estimated abundance of primordial lithium is 10^{−10} relative to hydrogen. The calculated abundance and ratio of ^{1}H and ^{4}He is in agreement with data from observations of young stars.

=== The P-P II branch ===
In stars, lithium-7 is made in a proton-proton chain reaction.

Proton–proton II chain reaction

^{3}_{2}He	+	^{4}_{2}He	→	^{7}_{4}Be	+	γ
^{7}_{4}Be	+	e^{−}	→	^{7}_{3}Li^{-}	+	ν_{e}	+	0.861 MeV	/	0.383 MeV
^{7}_{3}Li	+	^{1}_{1}H	→	2 ^{4}_{2}He

The P-P II branch is dominant at temperatures of 14 to 23 MK.

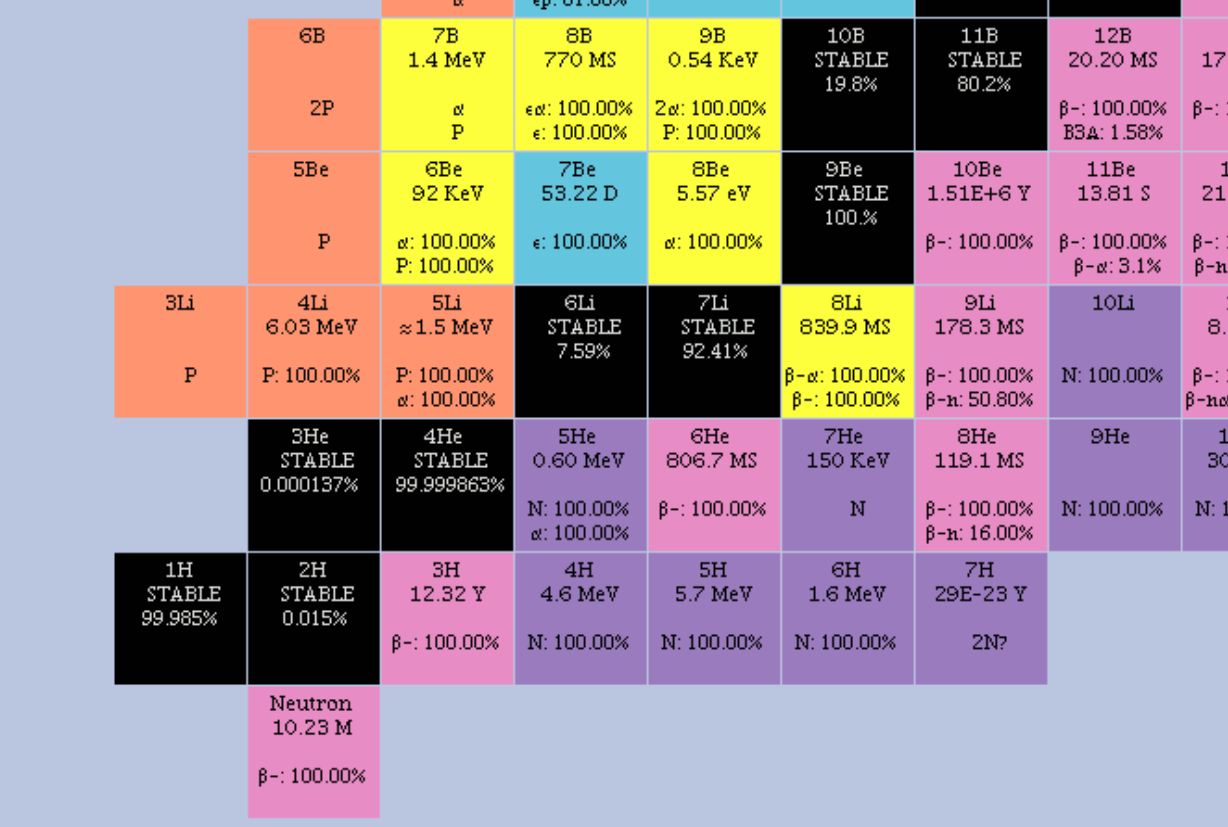
Stable nuclides of the first few elements

== Observed abundance of lithium ==
Despite the low theoretical abundance of lithium, the actual observable amount is less than the calculated amount by a factor of 3–4. This contrasts with the observed abundance of isotopes of hydrogen (^{1}H and ^{2}H) and helium (^{3}He and ^{4}He) that are consistent with predictions.

Abundances of the chemical elements in the Solar System. Hydrogen and helium are most common, residuals within the paradigm of the Big Bang. Li, Be and B are rare because they are poorly synthesized in the Big Bang and also in stars; while cosmic ray spallation is the dominant production channel for Be and B, recent Galactic chemical evolution models indicate that classical novae dominate Li enrichment in the Galactic disc at late times, accounting for a large fraction of the proto-solar and present-day lithium abundance. .

Older stars seem to have less lithium than they should, and some younger stars have much more. One proposed model is that lithium produced during a star's youth sinks beneath the star's atmosphere (where it is obscured from direct observation) due to effects the authors describe as "turbulent mixing" and "diffusion," which are suggested to increase or accumulate as the star ages. Spectroscopic observations of stars in NGC 6397, a metal-poor globular cluster, are consistent with an inverse relation between lithium abundance and age, but a theoretical mechanism for diffusion has not been formalized. Though it transmutes into two atoms of helium due to collision with a proton at temperatures above 2.4 million degrees Celsius (most stars easily attain this temperature in their interiors), lithium is more abundant than current computations would predict in later-generation stars.

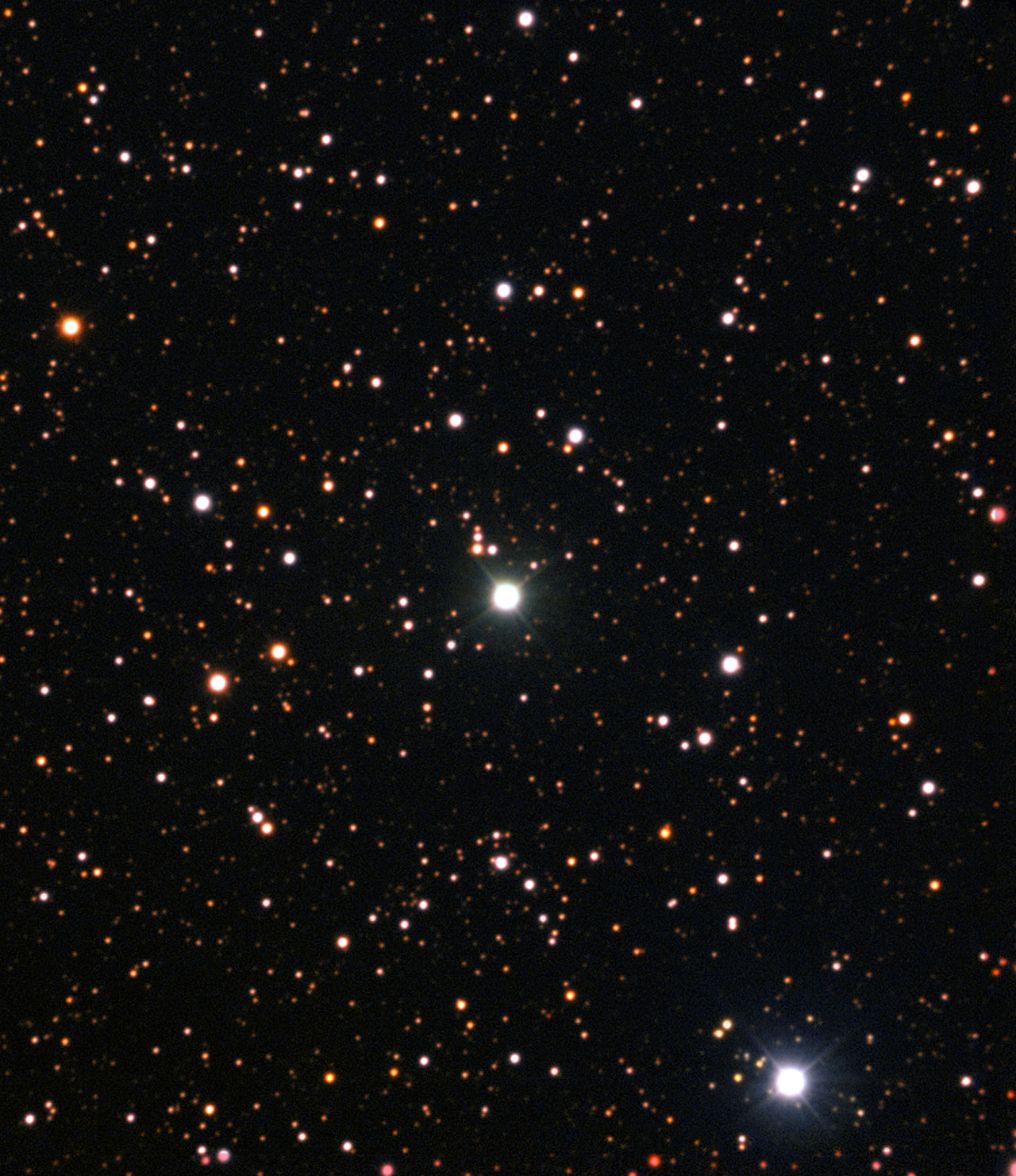
Nova Centauri 2013 is the first in which evidence of lithium has been found.

Lithium is also found in brown dwarf substellar objects and certain anomalous metal-poor stars. Because lithium is present in cooler, less massive brown dwarfs, but is destroyed in hotter red dwarf stars, its presence in the stars' spectra can be used in the "lithium test" to differentiate the two, as both are smaller than the Sun.

=== Less lithium in Sun-like stars with planets ===
Sun-like stars without planets have 10 times the lithium as Sun-like stars with planets in a sample of 500 stars. The Sun's surface layers have less than 1% the lithium that was in the protosolar material (as measured in meteorites) despite the surface convective zone not being quite hot enough to burn lithium. It is suspected that the gravitational pull of planets might enhance the churning up of the star's surface, driving the lithium to hotter cores where lithium burning occurs. The absence of lithium could also be a way to find new planetary systems. However, this claimed relationship has become a point of contention in the planetary astrophysics community, being frequently denied but also supported.

=== Higher than expected lithium in metal-poor stars ===
Certain metal-poor stars also contain an abnormally high concentration of lithium. These stars tended to orbit massive objects—neutron stars or black holes—whose gravity evidently pulls heavier lithium to the surface of a hydrogen-helium star, causing more lithium to be observed.

== Proposed solutions ==
Possible solutions fall into three broad classes.

=== Astrophysical solutions ===
Considering the possibility that BBN predictions are sound, the measured value of the primordial lithium abundance should be in error and astrophysical solutions offer revision to it. For example, systematic errors, including ionization correction and inaccurate stellar temperatures determination could affect Li/H ratios in stars. Furthermore, more observations on lithium depletion remain important since present lithium levels might not reflect the initial abundance in the star. Recent stellar evolution models that consistently include atomic diffusion, rotation-induced mixing, and angular momentum transport across Population II and Population I stars have shown that a nearly uniform lithium depletion naturally arises in metal-poor dwarf stars over a wide range of metallicities, while also reproducing the observed transition to increased dispersion at higher metallicities. These results strengthen the case for a stellar-depletion solution to the cosmological lithium problem. In summary, accurate measurements of the primordial lithium abundance is the current focus of progress, and it could be possible that the final answer does not lie in astrophysical solutions.

Some astronomers suggest that the velocities of nucleons do not follow a Maxwell-Boltzmann distribution. They test the framework of Tsallis non-extensive statistics. Their result suggest that 1.069 < q < 1.082 is a possible new solution to the cosmological lithium problem.

=== Nuclear physics solutions ===
When one considers the possibility that the measured primordial lithium abundance is correct and based on the Standard Model of particle physics and the standard cosmology, the lithium problem implies errors in the BBN light element predictions. Although standard BBN rests on well-determined physics, the weak and strong interactions are complicated for BBN and therefore might be the weak point in standard BBN calculation.

Firstly, incorrect or missing reactions could give rise to the lithium problem. For incorrect reactions, major thoughts lie within revision to cross section errors and standard thermonuclear rates according to recent studies.

Second, starting from Fred Hoyle's discovery of a resonance in carbon-12, an important factor in the triple-alpha process, resonance reactions, some of which might have evaded experimental detection or whose effects have been underestimated, become possible solutions to the lithium problem. These include:

^{7}_{4}Be	+	^{2}_{1}H	→	^{9}_{5}B *
^{7}_{4}Be	+	^{3}_{1}H	→	^{10}_{5}B *
^{7}_{4}Be	+	^{3}_{2}He	→	^{10}_{6}C *

Experimental and theoretical analyses rule out the first and third reactions.

BBC Science Focus wrote in 2023 that "recent research seems to completely discount" such theories; the magazine held that mainstream lithium nucleosynthesis calculations are probably correct.

=== Solutions beyond the Standard Model ===
Under the assumptions of all correct calculation, solutions beyond the existing Standard Model or standard cosmology might be needed.

Dark matter decay and supersymmetry provide one possibility, in which decaying dark matter scenarios introduce a rich array of novel processes that can alter light elements during and after BBN, and find the well-motivated origin in supersymmetric cosmologies. With the fully operational Large Hadron Collider (LHC), much of minimal supersymmetry lies within reach, which would revolutionize particle physics and cosmology if discovered; however, results from the ATLAS experiment in 2020 have excluded many supersymmetric models.

Changing fundamental constants can be one possible solution, and it implies that first, atomic transitions in metals residing in high-redshift regions might behave differently from our own. Additionally, Standard Model couplings and particle masses might vary, and variation in nuclear physics parameters would be needed.

Nonstandard cosmologies indicate variation of the baryon to photon ratio in different regions. One proposal is a result of large-scale inhomogeneities in cosmic density, different from homogeneity defined in the cosmological principle. However, this possibility requires a large amount of observations to test it.

== See also ==
- Big Bang
- Halo nucleus
- Isotopes of lithium
- List of unsolved problems in physics
- Lithium burning
