= Abundance of the chemical elements =

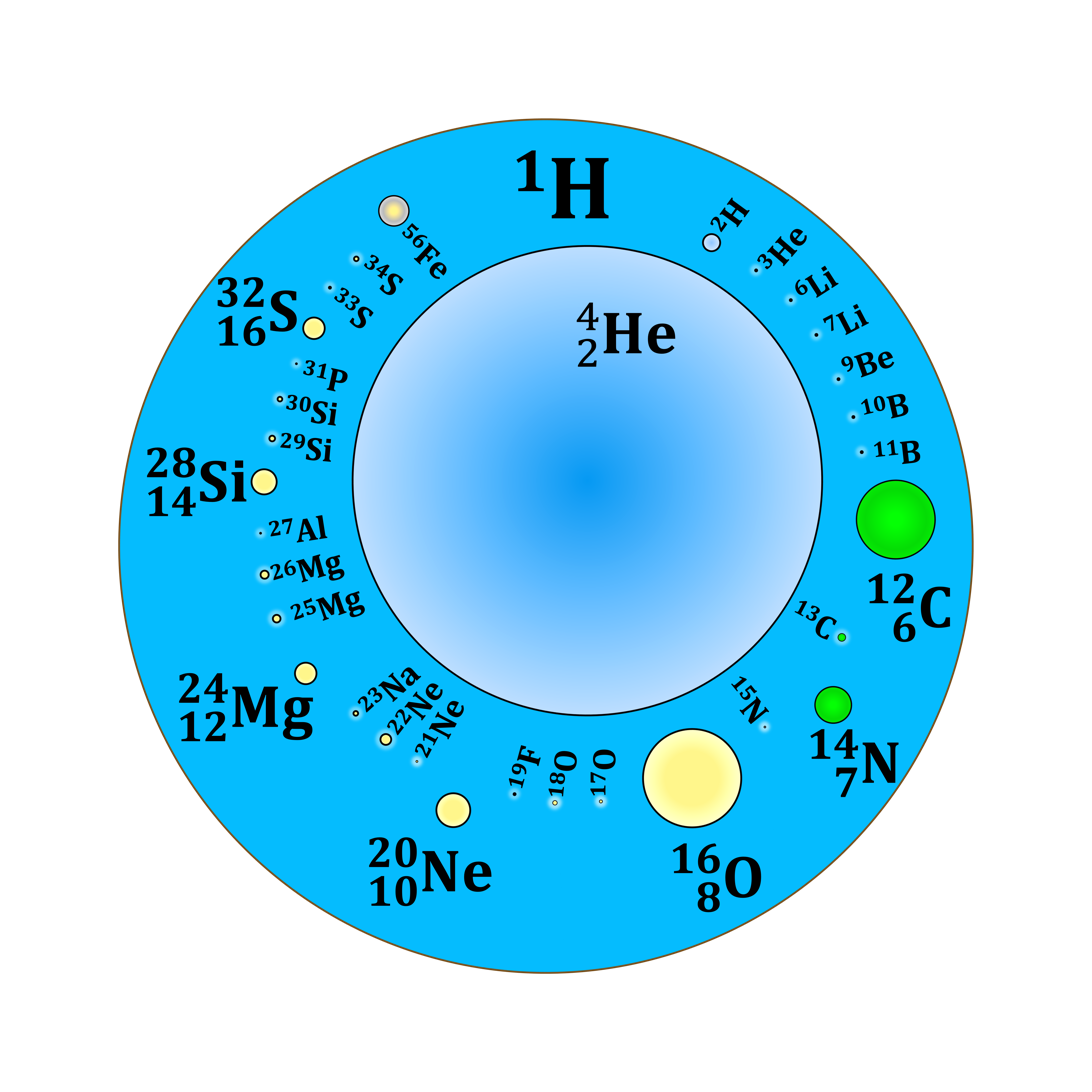
The most abundant isotopes in the universe. Relative abundance is proportional to the area of each circle. $\ce{^{1}H}$ (large blue circle) comprises 74% of the ordinary matter of the universe. Color corresponds to nucleosynthetic process: Blue: Big Bang; Green: dying low-mass stars; Yellow: exploding massive stars

The abundance of the chemical elements is a measure of the occurrences of the chemical elements relative to all other elements in a given environment. Abundance is measured in one of three ways: by mass fraction (in commercial contexts often called weight fraction), by mole fraction (fraction of atoms by numerical count, or sometimes fraction of molecules in gases), or by volume fraction. Volume fraction is a common abundance measure in mixed gases such as planetary atmospheres, and is similar in value to molecular mole fraction for gas mixtures at relatively low densities and pressures, and ideal gas mixtures. Most abundance values in this article are given as mass fractions.

The abundance of chemical elements in the universe is dominated by the large amounts of hydrogen and helium which were produced during Big Bang nucleosynthesis. Remaining elements, making up only about 2% of the universe, were largely produced by supernova nucleosynthesis. Elements with even atomic numbers are generally more common than their neighbors in the periodic table, due to their favorable energetics of formation, described by the Oddo–Harkins rule.

The abundance of elements in the Sun and outer planets is similar to that in the universe. Due to solar heating, the elements of Earth and the inner rocky planets of the Solar System have undergone an additional depletion of volatile hydrogen, helium, neon, nitrogen, and carbon (which volatilizes as methane). The crust, mantle, and core of the Earth show evidence of chemical segregation plus some sequestration by density. Lighter silicates of aluminium are found in the crust, with more magnesium silicate in the mantle, while metallic iron and nickel compose the core. The abundance of elements in specialized environments, such as atmospheres, oceans, or the human body, are primarily a product of chemical interactions with the medium in which they reside.

== Abundance values ==
Abundance of each element is expressed as a relative number. Astronomy uses a logarithmic scale for abundance $\epsilon_X$ of element X relative to hydrogen, defined by
$$\epsilon_X \equiv \log(N_X/N_H) + 12.00$$
for number density $N$; $\epsilon_H = 12.00$ on this scale. Another scale is mass fraction or, equivalently, percent by mass.

For example, the abundance of oxygen in pure water can be measured in two ways: the mass fraction is about 89%, because that is the fraction of water's mass which is oxygen. However, the mole fraction is about 33% because only 1 atom of 3 in water, H_{2}O, is oxygen. As another example, looking at the mass fraction abundance of hydrogen and helium in both the universe as a whole and in the atmospheres of gas-giant planets such as Jupiter, it is 74% for hydrogen and 23–25% for helium; while the (atomic) mole fraction for hydrogen is 92%, and for helium is 8%, in these environments. Changing the given environment to Jupiter's outer atmosphere, where hydrogen is diatomic while helium is not, changes the molecular mole fraction (fraction of total gas molecules), as well as the fraction of atmosphere by volume, of hydrogen to about 86%, and of helium to 13%. Below Jupiter's outer atmosphere, volume fractions are significantly different from mole fractions due to high temperatures (ionization and disproportionation) and high density, where the ideal gas law is inapplicable.

== Universe ==
Ten most common elements in the Milky Way Galaxy estimated spectroscopically
Z	Element	Mass fraction
1	Hydrogen	73.97%
2	Helium	24.02%
8	Oxygen	1.04%
6	Carbon	0.46%
10	Neon	0.134%
26	Iron	0.109%
7	Nitrogen	0.096%
14	Silicon	0.065%
12	Magnesium	0.058%
16	Sulfur	0.044%

The abundance of chemical elements in the universe is dominated by the large amounts of hydrogen and helium which were produced during Big Bang nucleosynthesis. Remaining elements, making up only about 2% of the universe, were largely produced by supernovae and certain red giant stars. Lithium, beryllium, and boron, despite their low atomic number, are rare. Although they are produced by nuclear fusion, lithium is destroyed by other reactions in the stars, and the most commonly-produced isotopes of beryllium and boron are highly unstable. Their natural occurrence is the result of cosmic ray spallation of carbon, nitrogen and oxygen in a type of nuclear fission reaction. The elements from carbon to iron are relatively more abundant in the universe because of the ease of making them in supernova nucleosynthesis. Elements of higher atomic numbers than iron (element 26) become progressively rarer in the universe, because they increasingly absorb stellar energy in their production. Also, elements with even atomic numbers are generally more common than their neighbors in the periodic table, due to favorable energetics of formation (see Oddo–Harkins rule), and among the lightest nuclides helium through sulfur the most abundant isotopes of equal number of protons and neutrons.

Hydrogen is the most abundant element in the Universe; helium is second. All others are orders of magnitude less common. After this, the rank of abundance does not continue to correspond to the atomic number. Oxygen has abundance rank 3, but atomic number 8.

There are 80 known stable elements, and the lightest 16 comprise 99.9% of the ordinary matter of the universe. These same 16 elements, hydrogen through sulfur, fall on the initial linear portion of the table of nuclides (also called the Segrè plot), a plot of the proton versus neutron numbers of all matter both ordinary and exotic, containing hundreds of stable isotopes and thousands more that are unstable. The Segrè plot is initially linear because (aside from hydrogen) the vast majority of ordinary matter (99.4% in the Solar System) contains an equal number of protons and neutrons (Z=N).

The abundance of the elements up to lithium is well predicted by the standard cosmological model, since they were mostly produced shortly (i.e., within a few hundred seconds) after the Big Bang, in a process known as Big Bang nucleosynthesis. Heavier elements were mostly produced much later, in stellar nucleosynthesis.

In general, elements up to iron are made by large stars in the process of becoming supernovae, or by smaller stars in the process of dying. Iron-56 is particularly common, since it is the most stable nuclide (in that it has the highest nuclear binding energy per nucleon) and can easily be "built up" from alpha particles (being a product of decay of radioactive nickel-56, ultimately made from 14 helium nuclei). Elements heavier than iron are made in energy-absorbing processes in large stars, and their abundance in the universe (and on Earth) generally decreases with increasing atomic number.

The table shows the ten most common elements in our galaxy (estimated spectroscopically), as measured in parts per million, by mass. Nearby galaxies that have evolved along similar lines have a corresponding enrichment of elements heavier than hydrogen and helium. The more distant galaxies are being viewed as they appeared in the past, so their abundances of elements appear closer to the primordial mixture. Since physical laws and processes are apparently uniform throughout the universe, however, it is expected that these galaxies will likewise have evolved similar abundances of elements.

As shown in the periodic table, the abundance of elements is in keeping with their origin. Very abundant hydrogen and helium are products of the Big Bang. The next three elements in the periodic table (lithium, beryllium, and boron) are rare, despite their low atomic number. They had little time to form in the Big Bang. They are produced in small quantities by nuclear fusion in dying stars or by breakup of heavier elements in interstellar dust, caused by cosmic ray spallation. In supernova stars, they are produced by nuclear fusion, but then destroyed by other reactions.

Periodic table showing the cosmological origin of each element

Heavier elements, beginning with carbon, have been produced in dying or supernova stars by buildup from alpha particles (helium nuclei), contributing to an alternatingly larger abundance of elements with even atomic numbers (these are also more stable). The effect of odd-numbered chemical elements generally being more rare in the universe was empirically noticed in 1914, and is known as the Oddo–Harkins rule. The following graph (log scale) shows abundance of elements in the Solar System.

Estimated abundances of the chemical elements in the Solar System (logarithmic scale)

Most abundant nuclides in the Solar System
Nuclide	A	Mass fraction in parts per million	Atom fraction in parts per million
Hydrogen-1	1	705,700	909,964
Helium-4	4	275,200	88,714
Oxygen-16	16	9,592	774
Carbon-12	12	3,032	326
Nitrogen-14	14	1,105	102
Neon-20	20	1,548	100
Other nuclides:		3,616	172
Silicon-28	28	653	30
Magnesium-24	24	513	28
Iron-56	56	1,169	27
Sulfur-32	32	396	16
Helium-3	3	35	15
Hydrogen-2	2	23	15
Neon-22	22	208	12
Magnesium-26	26	79	4
Carbon-13	13	37	4
Magnesium-25	25	69	4
Aluminium-27	27	58	3
Argon-36	36	77	3
Calcium-40	40	60	2
Sodium-23	23	33	2
Iron-54	54	72	2
Silicon-29	29	34	2
Nickel-58	58	49	1
Silicon-30	30	23	1
Iron-57	57	28	1

=== Relation to nuclear binding energy ===
Loose correlations have been observed between estimated elemental abundances in the universe and the nuclear binding energy curve (also called the binding energy per nucleon). Roughly speaking, the relative stability of various atomic nuclides in withstanding the extremely energetic conditions of Big Bang nucleosynthesis (BBN) has exerted a strong influence on the relative abundance of elements formed in the Big Bang, and during the development of the universe thereafter. See the article about nucleosynthesis for an explanation of how certain nuclear fusion processes in stars (such as carbon burning, etc.) create the elements heavier than hydrogen and helium.

A further observed peculiarity is the jagged alternation between relative abundance and scarcity of adjacent atomic numbers in the estimated abundances of the chemical elements in which the relative abundance of even atomic numbers is roughly 2 orders of magnitude greater than the relative abundance of odd atomic numbers (Oddo–Harkins rule). A similar alternation between even and odd atomic numbers can be observed in the nuclear binding energy curve in the neighborhood of carbon and oxygen, but here the loose correlation between relative abundance and binding energy ends. The binding energy for beryllium (an even atomic number), for example, is less than the binding energy for boron (an odd atomic number), as illustrated in the nuclear binding energy curve. Additionally, the alternation in the nuclear binding energy between even and odd atomic numbers resolves above oxygen as the graph increases steadily up to its peak at iron. The semi-empirical mass formula (SEMF), also called Weizsäcker's formula or the Bethe-Weizsäcker mass formula, gives a theoretical explanation of the overall shape of the curve of nuclear binding energy.

== Sun ==
Modern astronomy relies on understanding the abundance of elements in the Sun as part of cosmological models. Abundance values are difficult to obtain: even photospheric or observational abundances depend upon models of solar atmospherics and radiation coupling. These astronomical abundance values are reported as logarithms of the ratio with hydrogen. Hydrogen is set to an abundance of 12 on this scale.

The Sun's photosphere consists mostly of hydrogen and helium; the helium abundance varies between about 10.3 and 10.5 depending on the phase of the solar cycle; carbon is 8.47, neon is 8.29, oxygen is 7.69 and iron is estimated at 7.62.

== Earth ==
Parts-per-million cube of relative abundance by mass of elements of the entire Earth down to around 1 ppm

The Earth formed from the same cloud of matter that formed the Sun, but the planets acquired different compositions during the formation and evolution of the Solar System. In turn, the history of Earth led to parts of the planet having differing concentrations of the elements.

The mass of the Earth is approximately 5.97×10^{24} kg. By mass, it is composed mostly of iron (32.1%), oxygen (30.1%), silicon (15.1%), magnesium (13.9%), sulfur (2.9%), nickel (1.8%), calcium (1.5%), and aluminium (1.4%); with the remaining 1.2% consisting of trace amounts of other elements. The amount of oxygen, silicon, sulfur, carbon, and hydrogen in the Earth's core can only be inferred from theoretical models and consequently the abundance of these elements in the total Earth is not known precisely.

The bulk composition of the Earth by elemental mass is roughly similar to the gross composition of the solar system, with the major differences being that Earth is missing a great deal of the volatile elements hydrogen, helium, neon, and nitrogen, as well as carbon which has been lost as volatile hydrocarbons.

The remaining elemental composition is roughly typical of the "rocky" inner planets, which formed "inside" the "frost line" close to the Sun, where the young Sun's heat and stellar wind drove off volatile compounds into space.

The Earth retains oxygen as the second-largest component of its mass (and largest atomic fraction), mainly due to oxygen's high reactivity; this caused it to bond into silicate minerals which have a high melting point and low vapor pressure.

Estimated abundances of chemical elements in the Earth. The right two columns give the fraction of the mass in parts per million (ppm) and the fraction by number of atoms in parts per billion (ppb).
Atomic number	Name	Symbol	Mass fraction (ppm)	Atomic fraction (ppb)
8	oxygen	O	297,000	482,000,000
12	magnesium	Mg	154,000	164,000,000
14	silicon	Si	161,000	150,000,000
26	iron	Fe	319,000	148,000,000
13	aluminium	Al	15,900	15,300,000
20	calcium	Ca	17,100	11,100,000
28	nickel	Ni	18,220	8,010,000
1	hydrogen	H	260	6,700,000
16	sulfur	S	6,350	5,150,000
24	chromium	Cr	4,700	2,300,000
11	sodium	Na	1,800	2,000,000
6	carbon	C	730	1,600,000
15	phosphorus	P	1,210	1,020,000
25	manganese	Mn	1,700	800,000
22	titanium	Ti	810	440,000
27	cobalt	Co	880	390,000
19	potassium	K	160	110,000
17	chlorine	Cl	76	56,000
23	vanadium	V	105	53,600
7	nitrogen	N	25	46,000
29	copper	Cu	60	25,000
30	zinc	Zn	40	16,000
9	fluorine	F	10	14,000
21	scandium	Sc	11	6,300
3	lithium	Li	1.10	4,100
38	strontium	Sr	13	3,900
32	germanium	Ge	7.00	2,500
40	zirconium	Zr	7.10	2,000
31	gallium	Ga	3.00	1,000
34	selenium	Se	2.70	890
56	barium	Ba	4.50	850
39	yttrium	Y	2.90	850
33	arsenic	As	1.70	590
5	boron	B	0.20	480
42	molybdenum	Mo	1.70	460
44	ruthenium	Ru	1.30	330
78	platinum	Pt	1.90	250
46	palladium	Pd	1.00	240
58	cerium	Ce	1.13	210
60	neodymium	Nd	0.84	150
4	beryllium	Be	0.05	140
41	niobium	Nb	0.44	120
76	osmium	Os	0.90	120
77	iridium	Ir	0.90	120
37	rubidium	Rb	0.40	120
35	bromine	Br	0.30	97
57	lanthanum	La	0.44	82
66	dysprosium	Dy	0.46	74
64	gadolinium	Gd	0.37	61
52	tellurium	Te	0.30	61
45	rhodium	Rh	0.24	61
50	tin	Sn	0.25	55
62	samarium	Sm	0.27	47
68	erbium	Er	0.30	47
70	ytterbium	Yb	0.30	45
59	praseodymium	Pr	0.17	31
82	lead	Pb	0.23	29
72	hafnium	Hf	0.19	28
74	tungsten	W	0.17	24
79	gold	Au	0.16	21
48	cadmium	Cd	0.08	18
63	europium	Eu	0.10	17
67	holmium	Ho	0.10	16
47	silver	Ag	0.05	12
65	terbium	Tb	0.07	11
51	antimony	Sb	0.05	11
75	rhenium	Re	0.08	10
53	iodine	I	0.05	10
69	thulium	Tm	0.05	7
55	caesium	Cs	0.04	7
71	lutetium	Lu	0.05	7
90	thorium	Th	0.06	6
73	tantalum	Ta	0.03	4
80	mercury	Hg	0.02	3
92	uranium	U	0.02	2
49	indium	In	0.01	2
81	thallium	Tl	0.01	2
83	bismuth	Bi	0.01	1

=== Crust ===
Abundance (atom fraction) of the elements in Earth's upper continental crust as a function of atomic number. The rarest elements in the crust (shown in yellow) are rare due to multiple factors: all but one are the densest siderophiles (iron-loving) elements in the Goldschmidt classification, meaning they mix well with metallic iron, depleting them by relocating them deeper into Earth's core. Their abundance in meteoroids is higher. Tellurium has also been depleted by preaccretional sorting in the nebula via formation of volatile hydrogen telluride.

The mass-abundance of the nine most abundant elements in the Earth's crust is roughly: oxygen 46%, silicon 28%, aluminium 8.3%, iron 5.6%, calcium 4.2%, sodium 2.5%, magnesium 2.4%, potassium 2.0%, and titanium 0.61%. Other elements occur at less than 0.15%. For a full list, see abundance of elements in Earth's crust.

The graph at right illustrates the relative atomic-abundance of the chemical elements in Earth's upper continental crust—the part that is relatively accessible for measurements and estimation.

Many of the elements shown in the graph are classified into (partially overlapping) categories:

1. rock-forming elements (major elements in green field, and minor elements in light green field);
2. rare earth elements (lanthanides (La–Lu), Sc, and Y; labeled in blue);
3. major industrial metals (global production >~3×10^{7} kg/year; labeled in red);
4. precious metals (labeled in purple);
5. the nine rarest "metals" – the six platinum group elements plus Au, Re, and Te (a metalloid) – in the yellow field. These are rare in the crust from being soluble in iron and thus concentrated in Earth's core. Tellurium is the single most depleted element in the silicate Earth relative to cosmic abundance, because in addition to being concentrated as dense chalcogenides in the core it was severely depleted by preaccretional sorting in the nebula as volatile hydrogen telluride.

There are two breaks where the unstable elements technetium (atomic number 43) and promethium (number 61) would be. These elements are surrounded by stable elements, yet their most stable isotopes have relatively short half-lives (~4 million years and ~18 years respectively). These are thus extremely rare, since any primordial amounts of these elements have long since decayed. These two elements are now only produced naturally through spontaneous fission of very heavy radioactive elements (such as uranium, thorium, or the trace amounts of plutonium that exist in uranium ores), or by the interaction of certain other elements with cosmic rays. Both technetium and promethium have been identified spectroscopically in the atmospheres of stars, where they are produced by ongoing nucleosynthetic processes.

There are also breaks in the abundance graph where the six noble gases would be, since they are not chemically bound in the Earth's crust, and so their crustal abundance is not well-defined.

The eight naturally occurring very rare, highly radioactive elements (polonium, astatine, francium, radium, actinium, protactinium, neptunium, and plutonium) are not included, since any of these elements that were present at the formation of the Earth have decayed eons ago, and their quantity today is negligible and is only produced from radioactive decay of uranium and thorium.

Oxygen and silicon are the most common elements in the crust. On Earth and rocky planets in general, silicon and oxygen are far more common than their cosmic abundance. The reason is that they combine with each other to form silicate minerals. Other cosmically common elements such as hydrogen, carbon and nitrogen form volatile compounds such as ammonia and methane that easily boil away into space from the heat of planetary formation and/or the Sun's light.

==== Rare-earth elements ====
"Rare" earth elements is a historical misnomer. The persistence of the term reflects unfamiliarity rather than true rarity. The more abundant rare earth elements are similarly concentrated in the crust compared to commonplace industrial metals such as chromium, nickel, copper, zinc, molybdenum, tin, tungsten, or lead. The two least abundant stable rare earth elements (thulium and lutetium) are nearly 200 times more common than gold. However, in contrast to the ordinary base and precious metals, rare earth elements have very little tendency to become concentrated in exploitable ore deposits. Consequently, most of the world's supply of rare earth elements comes from only a handful of sources. Furthermore, the rare earth metals are all quite chemically similar to each other, and they are thus quite difficult to separate into quantities of the pure elements.

Differences in abundances of individual rare earth elements in the upper continental crust of the Earth represent the superposition of two effects, one nuclear and one geochemical. First, the rare earth elements with even atomic numbers (_{58}Ce, _{60}Nd, ...) have greater cosmic and terrestrial abundances than the adjacent rare earth elements with odd atomic numbers (_{57}La, _{59}Pr, ...). Second, the lighter rare earth elements are more incompatible (because they have larger ionic radii) and therefore more strongly concentrated in the continental crust than the heavier rare earth elements. In most rare earth ore deposits, the first four rare earth elements – lanthanum, cerium, praseodymium, and neodymium – constitute 80% to 99% of the total amount of rare earth metal that can be found in the ore.

=== Mantle ===
The mass-abundance of the seven most abundant elements in the Earth's mantle is approximately: oxygen 44.3%, magnesium 22.3%, silicon 21.3%, iron 6.32%, calcium 2.48%, aluminium 2.29%, nickel 0.19%.

=== Core ===
Due to mass segregation, the core of the Earth is believed to be primarily composed of iron (88.8%), with smaller amounts of nickel (5.8%), sulfur (4.5%), and less than 1% trace elements.

=== Ocean ===
The most abundant elements in the ocean by proportion of mass in percent are oxygen (85.84%), hydrogen (10.82%), chlorine (1.94%), sodium (1.08%), magnesium (0.13%), sulfur (0.09%), calcium (0.04%), potassium (0.04%), bromine (0.007%), carbon (0.003%), and boron (0.0004%).

=== Atmosphere ===
The order of elements by volume fraction (which is approximately molecular mole fraction) in the atmosphere is nitrogen (78.1%), oxygen (20.9%), argon (0.96%), followed by (in uncertain order) carbon and hydrogen because water vapor and carbon dioxide, which represent most of these two elements in the air, are variable components. Sulfur, phosphorus, and all other elements are present in significantly lower proportions.

According to the abundance curve graph, argon, a significant if not major component of the atmosphere, does not appear in the crust at all. This is because the atmosphere has a far smaller mass than the crust, so argon remaining in the crust contributes little to mass fraction there, while at the same time buildup of argon in the atmosphere has become large enough to be significant.

== Human body ==
Elemental abundance in the human body
Element	Proportion (by mass)
Oxygen	65
Carbon	18
Hydrogen	10
Nitrogen	3
Calcium	1.5
Phosphorus	1.2
Potassium	0.2
Sulfur	0.2
Chlorine	0.2
Sodium	0.1
Magnesium	0.05
Iron	< 0.05
Cobalt	< 0.05
Copper	< 0.05
Zinc	< 0.05
Iodine	< 0.05
Selenium	< 0.01

Parts-per-million cube of relative abundance by mass of elements in an average adult human down to 1 ppm

By mass, human cells consist of 65–90% water (H_{2}O), and a significant portion of the remainder is composed of carbon-containing organic molecules. Oxygen therefore contributes a majority of a human body's mass, followed by carbon. Almost 99% of the mass of the human body is made up of six elements: hydrogen (H), carbon (C), nitrogen (N), oxygen (O), calcium (Ca), and phosphorus (P). The next 0.75% is made up of the next five elements: potassium (K), sulfur (S), chlorine (Cl), sodium (Na), and magnesium (Mg). Only 17 elements are known for certain to be necessary to human life, with one additional element (fluorine) helpful for tooth enamel strength. A few more trace elements may play some role in the health of mammals. Boron and silicon are notably necessary for plants but have uncertain roles in animals. The elements aluminium and silicon, although very common in the earth's crust, are conspicuously rare in the human body.

Below is a periodic table highlighting nutritional elements.

Essential elements
H																		He
Li	Be												B	C	N	O	F	Ne
Na	Mg												Al	Si	P	S	Cl	Ar
K	Ca		Sc	Ti	V	Cr	Mn	Fe	Co	Ni	Cu	Zn	Ga	Ge	As	Se	Br	Kr
Rb	Sr		Y	Zr	Nb	Mo	Tc	Ru	Rh	Pd	Ag	Cd	In	Sn	Sb	Te	I	Xe
Cs	Ba	*	Lu	Hf	Ta	W	Re	Os	Ir	Pt	Au	Hg	Tl	Pb	Bi	Po	At	Rn
Fr	Ra	**	Lr	Rf	Db	Sg	Bh	Hs	Mt	Ds	Rg	Cn	Nh	Fl	Mc	Lv	Ts	Og
		*	La	Ce	Pr	Nd	Pm	Sm	Eu	Gd	Tb	Dy	Ho	Er	Tm	Yb
		**	Ac	Th	Pa	U	Np	Pu	Am	Cm	Bk	Cf	Es	Fm	Md	No

Legend:
The six basic organic elements
Quantity elements
Essential trace elements
Essentiality or function in mammals debated
No evidence for biological action in mammals, but essential or beneficial in some organisms

In the case of the lanthanides, the definition of an essential nutrient as being indispensable and irreplaceable is not completely applicable due to their extreme chemical similarity. The stable early lanthanides La–Nd are known to stimulate the growth of various lanthanide-using organisms, and Sm–Gd show lesser effects for some such organisms. The later elements in the lanthanide series do not appear to have such effects.

== See also ==
- Abundances of the elements (data page)
- Abundance of elements in Earth's crust
- Natural abundance – isotopic abundance
- Goldschmidt classification – Geochemical classification
- Primordial nuclide – Nuclides predating the Earth's formation (found on Earth)
- Radiative levitation – Stellar phenomenon
- List of data references for chemical elements
