= Clarke number =

Relative abundance of elements

Clarke number or clarke is the relative abundance of a chemical element, typically in Earth's crust. The technical definition of "Earth's crust" varies among authors, and the actual numbers also vary significantly.

== History ==
In the 1930s, USSR geochemist Alexander Fersman defined the relative abundance of chemical elements in geological objects, denoted in percents, as Russian: кларки, lit. 'the clarkes'. (Note: Fersman, A.E. (1934) [1934]. Geochemistry Геохимия (djvu) (in Russian). Vol. Том 1. Leningrad.: p141: definitions of "clarke".; p146 table 15 column 1 quotes Clarke (1889, p. 135) in Fersman (1934, p. 13)) but actual data is on p138, and the numbers on Fersman's are different from anything in Clarke (1889).; p161 fig.18 "clarkes of meteorites": An example of applying the term "clarke" to objects other than geospheres.) This was in honor to the American geochemist Frank Wigglesworth Clarke, who pioneered in estimating the chemical composition of Earth's crust, based on Clarke and colleague's extensive chemical analysis of numerous rock samples, throughout 1889 to 1924( (Note: Clarke, Frank Wiggleworths (1889-10-26). "The relative abundance of the chemical elements" (PDF). Bulletin of the Philosophical Society of Washington. 11. Philosophical Society of Washington (published 1892): 131–142.: Based on 880 igneous rock samples.; Chlorine and bromine data are summed.) (Note: Clarke, Frank Wiggleworths (1891). "Relative abundance of the chemical elements" (PDF). Report of Work Done in the Division of Chemistry and Physics Mainly During the Fiscal Year 1889-'90. Bulletin 78. United States Geological Survey: 39. doi:10.3133/b78. hdl:11244/39275.: Numbers identical to Clarke (1889).) (Note: Clarke, Frank Wiggleworths (1920). "The data of geochemistry" (PDF). Bulletin. 695 (4th ed.). United States Geological Survey. doi:10.3133/b695.: Numbers identical to (Clarke 1916)) (Note: Clarke, Frank Wiggleworths; Washington, Henry Stephens (1922-05-01). "The Average Chemical Composition of Igneous Rocks". Proceedings of the National Academy of Sciences of the United States of America. 8 (5). National Academy of Sciences: 108–115. Bibcode:1922PNAS....8..108C. doi:10.1073/pnas.8.5.108. PMC 1085008. PMID 16586858.: Based on 5159 igneous rock samples.; Table contains data for 31 elements, most comprehensive among Clarke's publications. Amount of cerium and yttrium are summed.) (Note: Clarke, Frank Wiggleworths; Washington, Henry Stephens (1924). "The composition of the earth's crust" (PDF). USGS Report. 127. United States Geological Survey: 4. Bibcode:1924usgs.rept....4C. doi:10.3133/pp127. hdl:2027/mdp.39015050613622.: Often cited. Beware there is another article in the same year (Clarke 1924) reporting different results.; Based on 5159 igneous rock samples.; p17 mentions that the 10miles crust consist of lithosphere:93.06%; hydrosphere:6.91%; atmosphere:0.03%, but p34 explains that table 17 is calculated using approximations ie. lithosphere:93%; hydrosphere:7%; atmosphere:0.03%. No mention of the exact calculation process.; Table 17 contains data for 27 elements. Amount of cerium and yttrium are summed.) (Note: Clarke, Frank Wiggleworths (1924). "The data of geochemistry" (PDF). Bulletin. 770 (5th ed.). United States Geological Survey: 3. Bibcode:1924usgs.rept....3C. doi:10.3133/b770.: p.27 mentions Clarke & Washington (1924), numbers differ. Data for only 20 elements, lesser than previous works such as Clarke & Washington (1924).; Based on 5159 igneous rock samples.; Amount of cerium and yttrium are summed.)).

Examples based on Fersman's definition:

- Russian: весовой кларк, lit. 'weight clarke': When the whole mass of a planet X is $Mx$ [kg], and the mass of oxygen there is $Mo$ [kg], then the weight clarke of oxygen in planet X is $Km=\frac{Mo}{Mx}$ (dimensionless)
- Russian: кларк числа атомов, lit. 'clarke of atom count': When the whole count of atoms in a rock Y is $Ay$ [mol], and the atom count of silicon there is $As$ [mol], then silicon's clarke of atom count in rock Y is $Ka=\frac{As}{Ay}$ (dimensionless)
- Fersman's "clarke of Earth's crust" is the Earth's surface including 16 km-thick lithosphere, hydrosphere and atmosphere.

=== In Russian ===
Russian: кларки is synonymous to "the relative abundance of elements" in any object, either in weight ratio or in atomic (number of atoms) ratio, regardless of how "Earth's crust" is defined, and denotation is not restricted to percents. (Note: Кларки in the Great Soviet Encyclopedia (in Russian) – via Great Scientific Library: Example data given (A.P.Vinogradov(1962), K.H.Wedepohl(1967)) are of igneous rocks in Earth's crust, excluding both hydrosphere and atmosphere.; Mistaken de:Karl Hans Wedepohl's first name with "Clarke".)

=== In English ===
In the English speaking world, the term "clarke" was not even used in Wells(1937) which introduced Fersman's proposal, nor in later USGS articles such as Fleischer(1953). (Note: Fleischer, Michael (1953). "Recent estimates of the abundances of the elements in the earth's crust" (PDF). Circular. 285. United States Geological Survey: 5. Bibcode:1953usgs.rept....5F. doi:10.3133/cir285. (a review)) They used the term "relative abundance of the elements". Brian Mason also mentioned the term "clarke" in Mason(1952) (Note: Mason, Brian Harold (1955) [1952]. Principles of Geochemistry (1st ed.). John Wiley & Sons. p. 42.: Attributing the term "clarke" to Vladimir Vernadsky. The numbers he gave as examples ("the clarke of oxygene is 46.60, of silicon, 27.72") was his own data (based on Clarke&Washington(1924) and Goldschmidt) for rocky crust excluding hydrosphere and atmosphere.; p.42 Attributing the term "clarke of concentration" to Vladimir Vernadsky, but without specifying location in source. Mason himself used the term "concentration clarke" instead.)(mistakenly attributing it to Vladimir Vernadsky, later corrected to Fersman in Mason(1958) (Note: Mason, Brian Harold (1958). Principles of Geochemistry (2nd ed.). John Wiley & Sons. p. 47. OCLC 614731481.: p.47 Corrected the term "clarke" originator to Fersman. He maintained "Clarke of concentration" come from Vernadsky.; p.45 Table 9 "The Average Amount of Elements in the Earth's Crust": Mason claims data for major elements are taken from Clarke and Washington but they are not. Most data for major elements are identical to Goldschmidt (1938, p. 99), which were only about igneous rocks. Mason argues that the average of igneous rocks can reasonably represent the whole crust.)), but the definition slightly differed from Fersman's, limiting it only to the average percentage in Earth's crust, but allowed to exclude hydrosphere and atmosphere. Besides for explaining the term, Mason himself did not use the term "clarke".

A variant term "clarke value" is occasionally used (examples: (Note: Economic Geology U.S.S.R. Vol. 1. Translated by Pergamon Institute. Pergamon Press. ISSN 0424-2777. OCLC 5304168. (translation of several Russian academic papers to English): occurrence of "clarke value") (Note: Lee, Tan; Yao, Chi-lung (1970) [1965]. "Abundance of chemical elements in the earth's crust and its major tectonic units". International Geology Review. 12 (7): 778–786. Bibcode:1970IGRv...12..778T. doi:10.1080/00206817009475289. (reprint from ACTA GEOLOGICA SINICA 1965, v.45 no.1 p.82-91. (PRC)): "Clarke values" in introduction. Chinese abstract Chinese: 克拉克值; lit. 'clarke value')). However, "clarke value" can have a different meaning, the clarke of concentration (example:).

Terms "clarke number" and "Clarke number" are found in articles written by Japanese authors (example: (Note: Miyake, Yasuo [in Japanese] (1939). "Chemical Studies of the Western Pacific Ocean. II. The Chemical Composition of the Oceanic Salt. Part 2". Bulletin of the Chemical Society of Japan. 14 (3). The Chemical Society of Japan: 55–58. doi:10.1246/bcsj.14.55.: Presenting only the ratio of Clarke numbers between strontium and calcium as 0.0059, without showing individual numbers nor source. "Clarke" is capitalized.)).

=== Usage in Japan ===
In Japan, "clarke" is translated as kurākusū (クラーク数, clarke number). The word sū (数, number) is always added, which happens to make the term appear similar in form with scientific constants such as abogadorosū (アボガドロ数, the Avogadro constant). The term may have a narrower sense than Fersman's. Several of the following constraints may apply:

- Only of Earth's crust (Note: 石原, 純, 1881-1947 (1939-12-10). クラーク数 [clarke number]. Rikagaku jiten (in Japanese) (1st Ed., Rev.2 ed.). Tokyo: Iwanami Shoten, Publishers. p. appendix VI. doi:10.11501/1161076. JPNO 49012036.: First revision of IDPC where term "clarke number" and data table appeared. Unsourced. Data identical to Kimura (1938).; Translation of quote from dictionary entry "clarke number": "F.W. Clarke assumed that rocks downto 10 miles (approx 16 km) below sea level should be quite similar to rocks on the surface of Earth. He determined a portion consisting of this, the hydrosphere and atmosphere as the outer part of the earth which is directly accessible to our observation, that is in weight percentage ratio of 93.06% lithosphere, 0.91% hydrosphere and 0.03% atmosphere. This portion is about 0.3% of the whole Earth. He calculated the weight percentage of elements in this portion. Thus, in accordance to A.Fersmann[sic]'s proposal, the abundance of elements in this range, denoted in weight percentage, are called clarke numbers." This differs from Fersman1934, p. 141)'s "clarke", is rather similar to his "clarke of Earth's crust", but further binding to just one of Clarke's variants through a vague phrase "in this range".)
- Lithosphere approximated as a 10 mile-deep layer from sea level
- Must include all of three layers: lithosphere (93.06%), hydrosphere (0.91%) and atmosphere (0.03%)
- Only mass ratio)
- Denote in percents) (not in ppm or ppb)
- (What the quoter believes to be) data from Clarke and Washington(1924)

Another peculiarity in Japan is the existence of a popular version of data, which was tabulated in reference books such as the annual "Chronological Scientific Tables" (RCST1939(1938) (Note: 東京天文台 (1938). Tokyo Astronomical Observatory (ed.). 地殻ヲナス元素ノ割合(クラーク数表) [Abundance ratio of elements in Earth's crust (Clarke numbers table)]. 理科年表 (in Japanese) (15 (S14(1939)) ed.). Tokyo Imperial University. p. E46. doi:10.11501/1223113. "Based on F.W.Clarke and H.S.Washington(1922). With slight correction by G.Berg(1934), Kenjiro Kimura(1938) et al.": Edition 1939 was the first edition to adopt Kimura (1938). Same data on edition 1939–1961.)), the "Dictionary of Physics and Chemistry" (IDPC(1939)) and other prominent books on geochemistry and chemistry. (Note: Onishi, Hiroshi (2001). "[Transition of Clarke Number as Seen in Rikagaku Jiten and Rika Nenpyo]" 「理化学辞典」と「理科年表」にみるクラーク数の変遷. The Journal of the Japanese Society for the History of Chemistry 化学史研究 (in Japanese). Vol. 28, no. 4. Japanese Society for the History of Chemistry. pp. 265–268.: An essay.; p.(62) denotes "Unfortunately, Rikanenpyō edition 34(RCST1961 (1961)) and edition 35(RCST1962 (1962a))'s usage of clarke numbers are erratic", but doesn't mention how.) This version Kimura(1938) (Note: Kimura(1938) = RCST1939 (1938, p. E46)) was devised by chemist Kenjiro Kimura. (Note: Kimura, Kenjiro (1939). 本邦温泉ノ微量成分ニ就テ [Minor substances in Japan' hot springs]. The Journal of the Japanese Society of Balneology, Climatology 日本温泉気候学会雑誌 (in Japanese). 5 (1) (1 ed.). 日本温泉気候物理医学会: 1–11. doi:10.11390/onki1935.5.1. "(p.11 footnote 8) table 3(sic) is a clarke number table based on data in recent literature and my recalculations" (p.5 table 4 is the clarke number table. Identical to Kimura (1938))) It was often quoted as The "Clarke numbers" (unsourced examples: (Note: Ito (1942). 稀有金屬の現况 (I) [Lecture: Recent trends regarding rare metals (I)] (PDF). Journal of the Japan Institute of Metals 日本金屬學會誌 (in Japanese). 6 (12) (12 ed.). The Japan Institute of Metals: A443 – A446. doi:10.2320/jinstmet1937.6.12_A443.: quote table with numbers identical to Kimura (1938) without mentioning source), (Note: Ebihara, Mitsuru (1998). "[Clarke numbers — doomed data?]" クラーク数―消えゆく数値?(どうやってそれを求めたの 1) (PDF). Kagaku to kyoiku 化学と教育 [Chemistry and education] (in Japanese). Vol. 46, no. 7. The Chemical Society of Japan. pp. 428–431. doi:10.20665/kakyoshi.46.7_428.: An essay.; p429: translation of quote: "today our knowledge have sub-ppb level accuracy. Clarke numbers, which are defined as percent-based, became inconvenient."; table 2 "clarke numbers": Lack citation. Values identical to Kimura (1938).; table 1 "average composition of igneous rocks": mis-cited as Clarke&Washington's are not. They are actually Mason's heavily modified version (Mason 1958, p. 41).)). The numbers differed from any versions by Clarke / Clarke&Washington (1889–1924), or anything listed in foreign (non-Japanese) articles such as the USGS compilation, thus unknown outside of Japan. Yet the numbers were sometimes quoted in English articles without citation (example:).

As geological definition of "Earth's crust" evolved, the "10 mile-deep" approximation were deemed out-of-date, and some people considered the term "clarke number" obsolete too. Yet other people may have meant broader senses, not limiting to Earth's crust, leading to confusion. (Note: クラーク数 [clarke number]. Iwanami rikagaku jiten (in Japanese) (3rd ed., amended ed.). Tokyo: Iwanami Shoten, Publishers. 1982 [1981]. p. 355. JPNO 81020460.: Have no data table titled "clarke number".) RCST1961(1961) switched their "clarke number" table from Kimura(1938) to Mason(1958) based (Note: Tokyo Astronomical Observatory, ed. (1961). 地殻をなす元素の割合 [Abundance ratio of elements in Earth's crust]. 理科年表 (in Japanese) (34 (S36(1961)) ed.). Tokyo Imperial University. p. 地87. "Numbers on this table represents the lithosphere, 10 miles thick from sea level, based mainly on Mason(1958).": Switched from Kimura (1938) to Mason (1958) based. Table's column title is "clarke number" on edition 1961–1962. Lists 85 elements, which is more than Mason(1958). Same data on edition 1961–1966.) (Note: Tokyo Astronomical Observatory, ed. (1962-01-20). 地殻をなす元素の割合 [Abundance ratio of elements in Earth's crust]. 理科年表 (in Japanese) (35 (S37(1962)) ed.). Tokyo Imperial University. "Numbers on this table represents the lithosphere, 10 miles thick from sea level, based mainly on Mason(1958). Weight percentage of elements in lithosphere+hydrosphere+atmosphere are called clarke numbers.": Mason (1958) based. Table's column title is "clarke number", which conflicts with the definition on the same page (see quote). Lists 85 elements which is more than Mason(1958). Same data on edition 1961–1966.), and the label "clarke number" on table was removed in RCST1963(1962) (Note: Tokyo Astronomical Observatory, ed. (1962-12-25). 地殻をなす元素の割合 [Abundance ratio of elements in Earth's crust]. 理科年表 (in Japanese) (36 (S38(1963)) ed.). Tokyo Imperial University. "Numbers on this table represents the lithosphere, 10 miles thick from sea level, based mainly on Mason(1958). Weight percentage of elements in lithosphere+hydrosphere+atmosphere are called clarke numbers.": Mason (1958) based. Table's column title changed to "weight percent ratio". Lists 85 elements which is more than Mason(1958). Same data on edition 1961–1966.). IDPC(1971) (Note: クラーク数 [clarke number]. Iwanami rikagaku jiten (in Japanese) (3rd ed.). Tokyo: Iwanami Shoten, Publishers. 1971. JPNO 69004765.: Have no data table titled "clarke number". The table titled "abundance of elements" was credited "based mostly on Taylor(1964) and Mason(1966)".) removed the "clarke number" table which was a Kimura(1938)'s variant (Note: 井上, 敏, 1894-1967 (1953). クラーク数 [clarke number]. Iwanami rikagaku jiten (in Japanese) (2nd ed.). Tokyo: Iwanami Shoten, Publishers. p. appendix XI. doi:10.11501/2421663. JPNO 54000017.: p365 dictionary entry "clarke number": Author of this entry is not mentioned. Text identical with IDPC (1939) except spelling "A.Fersmann"(sic) changed to "A.Fersman".; p1379 Appendix XI clarke number data table: Unsourced. Data almost identical to IDPC (1939), except masurium been removed, and footnotes added: "Recently, following updates are reported: Zn:8x10-3, Cu:7x10-3, Nb:2.4x10-3, Co:2.3x10-3, Tl:3x10-4, Ta:2.1x10-4, Cd:1.5x10-5 ... 93 Np: 1x10-18 (abundance rank 89 90), 94 Pu: 1x10-18 (abundance rank 89 90)". Data in these footnotes are not incorporated into the main table. Identical table is in "Kyoritsu Great Dictionary of Chemistry" (Concise edition KGDC (1963, p. v3 p67)).; From 2nd edition, "Iwanami" was added to the title of the book.) (Note: Sugawara, Ken (1982-08-15) [1963-09-15]. クラーク数 [clarke number]. Kyoritsu Great Dictionary of Chemistry, Concise Edition (in Japanese). Vol. 3 (Concise rev.32 ed.). Tokyo: Kyoritsu Shuppan. p. 67. ISBN 4-320-04017-1.: Publication date of 1st non-concise edition is 1960; Entry's author is Ken Sugawara. Cited source is Miyake, Yasuo [in Japanese] (1954). 地球化学 [Geochemistry] (in Japanese).. Table content identical to IDPC (1953, a.XI), with the same footnotes.; Extra quotes: "In addition to the typical mass/mass% table, Miyake recently proposed a novel table re-written in mol/kg (Miyake,1954)"). IDPC(1981) said the term is mostly abandoned, and the dictionary entry for "clarke number" itself was removed from IDPC(1998). So "clarke numbers" became associated almost solely with Kimura(1938)'s data, but Kimura's name forgotten. Incidentally, in major reference books, there was no data table titled "clarke numbers" which showed Clarke's original tables.

Despite being removed from major reference books, data from Kimura(1938) and phrases such as "the Clarke number of iron is 4.70", unsourced, continue to circulate, even in the 2010s (example: (Note: Takada, Jun; Nakanishi, Makoto (2017). "Development of Novel Reddish Iron Oxide Based on Traditional Pigment "Bengala"" 伝統の"ベンガラ"から新規な赤色酸化鉄への研究展開 ―備中吹屋ベンガラの復元から微生物由来酸化鉄ベンガラへの飛躍― (PDF). Journal of the Society of Materials Science, Japan 材料 (in Japanese). 66 (11). The Society of Materials Science, Japan: 799–803. doi:10.2472/jsms.66.799. "the clarke number of iron is 4.70": Using clarke numbers without citation)).

== Example data ==
This section lists only historical data. For recent data, see Abundance of elements in Earth's crust.

Technical definition of "clarke", "Earth's crust" and "lithosphere" differ among authors, and the actual numbers vary accordingly, sometimes by several times. Even the same author presents multiple versions, with various estimation parameters or knowledge refinements. Yet they are often quoted without source, rendering the data unverifiable. Clarke & Washington presented estimations of the average composition of the outer part of Earth with four variants:

1. 10-mile crust, hydrosphere and atmosphere.
2. 20-mile crust, hydrosphere and atmosphere.
3. 10-mile crust, only igneous rocks and sedimentary rocks. (i.e. exclude hydrosphere and atmosphere)
4. 10-mile crust, only igneous rocks. (i.e. exclude hydrosphere and atmosphere)

"The earth's crust" in Clarke and Washington works can mean two different things: (a) The whole outer part of Earth, i.e. lithosphere, hydrosphere and atmosphere; (b) Only the lithosphere, which in their works just meant "the rocky crust of the earth". "Crust" here means (b).

- Following tables do not cover all elements. Some elements not on the table may have larger abundance. Some minor elements are listed here to aid identifying the origin of unsourced documents.
- Some entries contain data for the disputed element 43 masurium.
- Precision (number of digits) may be adjusted to improve legibility.

=== Of the mass of 10 mile-thick lithosphere plus hydrosphere and atmosphere ===
Tables of historical data for some elements of their relative abundance in Earth's crust.

cited as		Clarke (1889)	Clarke (1891)	Clarke (1908)	Clarke (1911)	Clarke (1916)	Clarke (1920)	Clarke & Washington (1922)	Clarke & Washington (1924)	Clarke (1924)	Berg (1929)	Berg (1932)	Fersman (1923)	Fersman (1934)	RCST1937 (1936)	RCST1939 (1938)	Kimura (1939)
cited in														(Note: Fersman, A.E. (1955). "Geochemistry Vol1" Геохимия. Selected Works of Academician A.E. Fersman Избранные труды академика А.Е.Ферсмана (in Russian). Vol. Том 3. Moscow: Publishing House of the Academy of Sciences of the USSR. (Posthumous revision. Data in p174 table 15 seems identical to Fersman (1934, p. 148 table 15)))	(Note: 東京天文台 (1936). Tokyo Astronomical Observatory (ed.). 地殻ヲナス元素ノ割合(クラーク数表) [Abundance ratio of elements in Earth's crust (Clarke numbers table)]. 理科年表 (in Japanese) (Edition 13 (S12(1937)) ed.). Tokyo Imperial University. p. 316. doi:10.11501/1223097. "Based on F.W.Clarke and H.S.Washington(1922). With slight correction by G.Berg(1934), et al.": Edition 1937 was the first edition to use the term "clarke number (クラーク数)". Same data on edition 1937–1938.)		
	titled "clarke"?	-	-	-	-	-	-	-	-	-			-	Yes	Yes	Yes	Yes
	elements	19	19	20	20	20	20	31	27	20			28	87	89	89	89
lithosphere		93%	93%	93%	93%	93%	93%	93%	93%	93%	13.5/14.5		Yes	Yes	Yes	Yes	Yes
	definition	10 miles	10 miles	10 miles	10 miles	10 miles	10 miles	10 miles	10 miles	10 miles	16 km	16 km		16 km	16 km	16 km	10 miles
	rock types	All	All	All	All	All	All	All	All	All	All		All	All	All	All	All
hydrosphere		ocean 7%	ocean 7%	ocean 7%	ocean 7%	ocean 7%	ocean 7%	7%	7%	7%	1/14.5		Yes	Yes	Yes	Yes	Yes
atmosphere		N 0.02%	N 0.02%	N 0.02%	N 0.02%	N 0.02%	N 0.02%	0.03%	0.03%	Yes			Yes	Yes	Yes	Yes	Yes
remarks		often mentioned							often cited. >100%			>100%	>100%			popular in Japan	
Z	element	(mass%)	(mass%)	(mass%)	(mass%)	(mass%)	(mass%)	(mass%)	(mass%)	(mass%)	(mass%)	(mass%)	(mass%)	(mass%)	(mass%)	(weight%)	(weight%)
8 O	oxygen	49.98	49.98	49.78	49.85	50.02	50.02	49.190	49.520	49.20	49.5000	49.500	49.70	49.130	49.500	49.500	49.500
14 Si	silicon	25.30	25.30	26.08	26.03	25.80	25.80	25.710	25.750	25.67	25.7000	25.300	26.00	26.000	25.300	25.800	25.800
13 Al	aluminium	7.26	7.26	7.34	7.28	7.30	7.30	7.500	7.510	7.50	7.5000	7.500	7.45	7.450	7.500	7.560	7.560
26 Fe	iron	5.08	5.08	4.11	4.12	4.18	4.18	4.680	4.700	4.71	4.7000	5.080	4.20	4.200	5.040	4.700	4.700
20 Ca	calcium	3.51	3.51	3.19	3.18	3.22	3.22	3.370	3.390	3.39	3.3900	3.390	3.25	3.250	3.390	3.390	3.390
11 Na	sodium	2.28	2.28	2.33	2.33	2.36	2.36	2.610	2.640	2.63	2.6300	2.630	2.40	2.400	2.630	2.630	2.630
19 K	potassium	2.23	2.23	2.28	2.33	2.28	2.28	2.380	2.400	2.40	2.4000	2.400	2.35	2.350	2.400	2.400	2.400
12 Mg	magnesium	2.50	2.50	2.24	2.11	2.08	2.08	1.940	1.940	1.93	1.9300	1.930	2.35	2.350	1.930	1.930	1.930
1 H	hydrogen	0.94	0.94	0.95	0.97	0.95	0.95	0.872	0.880	0.87	0.8700	0.870	1.00	1.000	0.870	0.870	0.870
22 Ti	titanium	0.30	0.30	0.37	0.41	0.43	0.43	0.648	0.580	0.58	0.5800	0.630	0.50	0.610	0.630	0.460	0.460
17 Cl	chlorine	0.15 (Cl+Br)	0.15 (Cl+Br)	0.21	0.20	0.20	0.20	0.228	0.188	0.19	0.1900	0.190	0.20	0.200	0.190	0.190	0.190
25 Mn	manganese	0.07	0.07	0.07	0.08	0.08	0.08	0.108	0.080	0.09	0.0900	0.090	0.09	0.100	0.090	0.090	0.090
15 P	phosphorus	0.09	0.09	0.11	0.10	0.11	0.11	0.142	0.120	0.11	0.1200	0.120	0.10	0.120	0.120	0.080	0.080
6 C	carbon	0.21	0.21	0.19	0.19	0.18	0.18	0.139	0.087	0.08	0.0800	0.080	0.35	0.350	0.080	0.080	0.080
16 S	sulfur	0.04	0.04	0.11	0.10	0.11	0.11	0.093	0.048	0.06	0.0600	0.060	0.10	0.100	0.060	0.060	0.060
7 N	nitrogen	0.02	0.02	0.02	0.03	0.03	0.03	0.030	0.030	0.03	0.0300	0.030	0.04	0.040	0.030	0.030	0.030
9 F	fluorine	-	-	0.02	0.10	0.10	0.10	0.030	0.027	0.03	0.0270	0.026	0.08	0.080	0.026	0.030	0.030
37 Rb	rubidium	-	-	-	-	-	-	-	-	-	0.0033	3.50E-03	-	0.008	3.50E-03	0.030	0.030
56 Ba	barium	0.03	0.03	0.09	0.09	0.08	0.08	0.075	0.047	0.04	0.0400	0.040	0.04	0.050	0.040	0.023	0.023
40 Zr	zirconium	-	-	-	-	-	-	0.048	0.023	-	0.0230	0.023	-	0.025	0.023	0.020	0.020
24 Cr	chromium	0.01	0.01	-	-	-	-	0.062	0.033	-	0.0330	0.038	0.02	0.030	0.033	0.020	0.020
38 Sr	strontium	-	-	0.03	0.03	0.02	0.02	0.032	0.017	0.02	0.0200	0.020	0.02	0.040	0.020	0.020	0.020
23 V	vanadium	-	-	-	-	-	-	0.038	0.016	-	0.0160	0.018	0.02	0.020	0.013	0.015	0.015
28 Ni	nickel	-	-	-	-	-	-	0.030	0.018	-	0.0180	0.018	0.02	0.020	0.018	0.010	0.010
29 Cu	copper	-	-	-	-	-	-	0.010	0.010	-	0.0100	0.010	0.02	0.010	0.010	0.010	0.010
58 Ce	cerium	-	-	-	-	-	-	0.019 (Ce+Y)	0.014 (Ce+Y)	-	0.0022	2.00E-03	-	2.90E-03	2.00E-03	4.50E-03	4.50E-03
30 Zn	zinc	-	-	-	-	-	-	0.004	-	-	0.0045	0.017	-	0.020	0.017	4.00E-03	4.00E-03
32 Ge	germanium	-	-	-	-	-	-	-	-	-	2.00E-08	1.00E-04	-	4.00E-04	1.00E-04	6.50E-04	6.50E-04
43 Ma	masurium	-	-	-	-	-	-	-	-	-	-	-	-	1.00E-07	1.00E-07	1.00E-07	1.00E-07
others		0.00	0.00	0.48	0.47	0.47	0.47	0.00	0.032	0.47							

=== Other variants ===
Some authors call these "clarkes" too, some do not.

cited as		Clarke (1889)	Clarke & Washington (1924)	Clarke & Washington (1924)	Clarke & Washington (1924)	Clarke (1924)	Goldschmidt (1937)	Goldschmidt (1937)	Mason (1952)	Mason (1958)	RCST1961 (1961)	Mason (1966)	Mason & Moore (1982)
cited in													(Note: Mason, Brian Harold; Moore, Carleton B. (1982). Principles of Geochemistry (4th ed.). John Wiley & Sons. p. 49. ISBN 978-0-471-08642-0. (other format ISBN 978-0-471-57522-1): pp.46-47 Table 3.5 "The Average Amounts of the Elements in Crustal Rocks in Grams per Ton or Parts per Million")
	titled "clarke"?	-	-	-	-	-		-	-	-	Yes	-	-
	elements	19	27	27	35	20			80	80	85	78	78
lithosphere		100%	Yes	100%	100%	100%	100%	100%	100%	100%	100%	100%	100%
	definition	10 miles	20miles	10 miles	10 miles	10 miles			10 miles	10 miles	10 miles		
	rock types	All	All	igneous + sedimentary	igneous	All	igneous	igneous	All	All	All	All	All
hydrosphere		(no)	Yes	(no)	(no)	(no)	(no)	(no)	(no)	(no)	Yes	(no)	(no)
atmosphere		(no)	Yes	(no)	(no)	(no)	(no)	(no)	(no)	(no)	Yes	(no)	(no)
remarks											wrong composition		
Z	element	(mass%)	(mass%)	(mass%)	(mass%)	(mass%)	(mass ppm)	(weight%)	(mass ppm)	(mass ppm)	(weight%)	(mass ppm)	(mass ppm)
8 O	oxygen	47.29	48.080	46.710	46.590	46.46		46.600	466,000	466,000	46.600	466,000	466,000
14 Si	silicon	27.21	26.720	27.690	27.720	27.61	277,200	27.720	277,200	277,200	27.720	277,200	277,200
15 Al	aluminium	7.81	7.790	8.070	8.130	8.07	81,300	8.130	81,300	81,300	8.130	81,300	81,300
26 Fe	iron	5.46	4.870	5.050	5.010	5.06	50,000	5.000	50,000	50,000	5.000	50,000	50,000
20 Ca	calcium	3.77	3.520	3.650	3.630	3.64	36,300	3.630	36,300	36,300	3.630	36,300	36,300
11 Na	sodium	2.36	2.690	2.750	2.850	2.75	28,300	2.830	28,300	28,300	2.830	28,300	28,300
19 K	potassium	2.40	2.490	2.580	2.600	2.58	25,900	2.590	25,900	25,900	2.590	25,900	25,900
12 Mg	magnesium	2.68	2.010	2.080	2.090	2.07	20,900	2.090	20,900	20,900	2.090	20,900	20,900
1 H	hydrogen	0.21	0.510	0.140	0.130	0.14	nicht ber.	-	1,400	1,400	0.140	1,400	1,400
22 Ti	titanium	0.33	0.600	0.620	0.630	0.62	4,400	0.440	4,400	4,400	0.440	4,400	4,400
17 Cl	chlorine	0.01	0.101	0.045	0.048	0.05	480	0.048	314	200	0.020	130	130
25 Mn	manganese	0.08	0.090	0.090	0.100	0.09	1,000	0.100	1,000	1,000	0.100	950	950
15 P	phosphorus	0.10	0.130	0.130	0.130	0.12	800	0.118	1,180	1,180	0.118	1,050	1,050
6 C	carbon	0.22	0.091	0.094	0.032	0.09		0.032	320	320	0.032	200	200
16 S	sulfur	0.03	0.050	0.052	0.052	0.06	520	0.052	520	520	0.052	260	260
7 N	nitrogen	-	0.016	-	-	-		-	46	46	0.0046	20	20
9 F	fluorine	-	0.028	0.029	0.030	0.03		0.030	300	700	0.070	625	625
37 Rb	rubidium	-	-	-	-	-	310	0.031	310	120	0.012	90	90
56 Ba	barium	0.03	0.048	0.050	0.050	0.04	250	0.025	250	400	0.040	425	425
40 Zr	zirconium	-	0.024	0.025	0.026	-	220	0.022	220	160	0.016	165	165
24 Cr	chromium	0.01	0.034	0.035	0.037	-	200	0.020	200	200	0.020	100	100
38 Sr	strontium	-	0.017	0.018	0.019	0.02	150	0.015	300	450	0.045	375	375
23 V	vanadium	-	0.016	0.016	0.017	-	150	0.015	150	110	0.011	135	135
28 Ni	nickel	-	0.018	0.019	0.020	-	100	0.010	80	80	0.008	75	75
29 Cu	copper	-	0.010	0.010	0.010	-	100	0.010	70	45	0.0045	55	55
58 Ce	cerium	-	0.014 (Ce+Y)	0.014 (Ce+Y)	0.015 (Ce+Y)	-	46.1	0.0046	46	46	0.0046	60	60
30 Zn	zinc	-	-	-	0.004	-	40	0.004	132	65	0.0065	70	70
32 Ge	germanium	-	-	-	n*E-11	-	7	0.0007	7	2	2.00E-04	1.5	1.5
43 Ma	masurium	-	-	-	-	-	-	-	-	-	-	-	-
others			0.033	0.033		0.500							

== Clarke of concentration ==
A related term "clarke of concentration" or "concentration clarke", synonym: "concentration factor (mineralogy)", is a measure to see how rich a particular ore is. That is, the ratio between the concentrations of a chemical element in the ore, and its concentration in the whole Earth's crust (i.e. "clarke") (Note: Laznicka, Peter (2010) [2006]. Giant metallic deposits. Future sources of industrial metals (2 ed.). Berlin: Springer. doi:10.1007/978-3-642-12405-1. ISBN 978-3-642-12404-4.: p43 says the originator of term "clarke of concentration" is Fersman(1933) but reference in p774 actually refers to Fersman (1955)).

If the concentration of a commodity in an ore X is $Kx$ [ppm], and the "clarke" of that commodity is $Ke$ [ppm], then "the clarke of concentration" of that commodity X is $Kk=\frac{Kx}{Ke}$ (dimensionless).

The value represents the degree to which the commodity is concentrated from crustal abundances to the ore by natural geochemical processes; a clue for whether the commodity could be mined economically.

== See also ==
- Abundance of elements in Earth's crust, modern data
