= Giuseppe Oddo =

Italian chemist

- Born: 9 June 1865; Caltavuturo, Italy
- Died: 5 November 1954 (aged 89); Palermo, Italy

Giuseppe Oddo (9 June 1865 – 5 November 1954) was an Italian chemist. The Oddo–Harkins rule is named after him and William Draper Harkins. He published his findings in 1914 in a German journal.
