= Relic abundance =

Amount of particles remaining from the Big Bang

In cosmology, the relic abundance of a given elementary particle is a measure of the present quantity of that particle remaining from the Big Bang.

== Uses ==
Relic abundance is modelled for WIMPs (weakly interacting massive particles) in the study of dark matter.

== Calculation ==
Assuming that an elementary particle was formerly in thermal equilibrium, its relic abundance may be calculated using a Boltzmann equation.

The temperature scaled abundance of a particle is defined by

$$Y \equiv \frac{n}{T^3}$$

where $n$ is the number density:

$$n \equiv \frac{N}{V}$$

that is, number of particles per physical volume (not the comoving volume).

The relic abundance of a particle is shown by $Y_\infty$ indicates the asymptotic value of abundance of a species of a particle which it will reach after its "freeze-out".
