= Lithium burning =

Process by which lithium is spent in a star

Lithium burning is a nucleosynthetic process in which lithium is depleted in a star. Lithium is generally present in brown dwarfs and not in older low-mass stars. Stars, which by definition must achieve the high temperature (2.5 million K) necessary for fusing hydrogen, rapidly deplete their lithium.

From a study of lithium abundances in 53 T Tauri stars, it has been found that lithium depletion varies strongly with size, suggesting that lithium burning by the P-P chain, during the last highly convective and unstable stages during the pre–main sequence later phase of the Hayashi contraction may be one of the main sources of energy for T Tauri stars. Rapid rotation tends to improve mixing and increase the transport of lithium into deeper layers where it is destroyed. T Tauri stars generally increase their rotation rates as they age, through contraction and spin-up, as they conserve angular momentum. This causes an increased rate of lithium loss with age. Lithium burning will also increase with higher temperatures and mass, and will last for at most a little over 100 million years.

It will not occur in stars less than sixty times the mass of Jupiter. In this way, the rate of lithium depletion can be used to calculate the age of the star.

== Lithium-7 ==
Burning of the most abundant isotope of lithium, lithium-7, occurs by a collision of lithium-7 and a proton producing beryllium-8, which promptly decays into two helium-4 nuclei. The temperature necessary for this reaction is just below the temperature necessary for hydrogen fusion. Convection in low-mass stars ensures that lithium in the whole volume of the star is depleted. Therefore, the presence of the lithium line in a candidate brown dwarf's spectrum is a strong indicator that it is indeed substellar.

p	+	^{7}_{3}Li	→ 2×	^{4}_{2}He	+ 17.35MeV

== Lithium-6 ==
Lithium-6 is primarily consumed via a $(p,\alpha)$ reaction with protons, yielding helium-3 and helium-4. Because this pathway operates via the strong nuclear force, its reaction cross-section is several orders of magnitude larger than the $(p,\gamma)$ electromagnetic radiative capture process, even at the low temperatures of stellar interiors. Therefore, the destruction of lithium-6 directly produces helium isotopes rather than forming beryllium-7.

p	+	^{6}_{3}Li	→	^{3}_{2}He	+	^{4}_{2}He	+ 4.02MeV

== Lithium test ==
The use of lithium to distinguish candidate brown dwarfs from low-mass stars is commonly referred to as the lithium test. Heavier stars like the Sun can retain lithium in their outer atmospheres, which never get hot enough for lithium depletion, but those are distinguishable from brown dwarfs by their size. Brown dwarfs at the high end of their mass range (60–75 M_{J}) can be hot enough to deplete their lithium when they are young. Dwarfs of mass greater than 65 M_{J} can burn off their lithium by the time they are half a billion years old; thus, this test is not perfect.

== See also ==
- Cosmological lithium problem
- Dilithium
- Halo nucleus
- Isotopes of lithium
- Lithium
