= HE 1219−0312 =

Extremely metal-poor star in the constellation Virgo

Observation data Epoch J2000 Equinox ICRS
- Constellation: Virgo
- Right ascension: 12^{h} 21^{m} 34.143^{s}
- Declination: −03° 28′ 39.64″
- Apparent magnitude (V): 15.94

Characteristics
- Evolutionary stage: Metal-poor star
- Spectral type: CEMP

Astrometry
| Proper motion (μ) | RA: −2.817 mas/yr Dec.: −8.763 mas/yr |
| Parallax (π) | 0.0893±0.042 mas |
| Distance | approx. 40,000 ly (approx. 11,000 pc) |

Details
| Mass | 0.8 M_{☉} |
| Radius | 2.5 R_{☉} |
| Luminosity | 6.3 L_{☉} |
| Surface gravity (log g) | 2.05 cgs |
| Temperature | 5,100 K |
| Metallicity [Fe/H] | −2.96 dex |

Other designations
- HE 1219−0312, 2MASS J12213413−0328396

Database references
| SIMBAD | data |

HE 1219−0312 is an extremely metal-poor star in the constellation Virgo. The star is located at around 41,400 light-years away from Earth.

It is thought to be a second generation, Population II or metal-poor star ([Fe/H] = −2.96), The star was found in the sample of extremely metal-poor halo stars from the Hamburg/ESO Survey by W. Hayek and collaborators. The group's research was published in the July 2, 2009 issue of The Astrophysical Journal.

== Elemental abundance ==
The elemental abundances of two strongly r-process enhanced metal-poor stars, BPS CS29491−0069 and HE 1219−0312, were measured by the HERES project, resulting in a value of [Fe/H] = –2.96 and [r/Fe] = +1.5 for HE 1219−0312.

The analysis based on high-quality VLT/UVES spectra and MARCS model atmosphere was detected these eighteen heavy elements in the spectrum of HE 1219−0312 with a case of Th II 4019A line.

Radioactive dating for HE 1219−0312 with the observed thorium and rare-earth elements abundance pairs results in an age of 9.5 ± 6.0 billion years. When based on solar r-process residuals, an age of 17.6 ± 6.8 billion years is obtained. This roughly matches the typical age range for previously discovered metal-poor halo stars of 11–12 billion years.

== See also ==
- HD 140283
- HE 0107−5240
- HE 1523−0901
