= SMSS J031300.36−670839.3 =

Star in the constrellation Hydrus

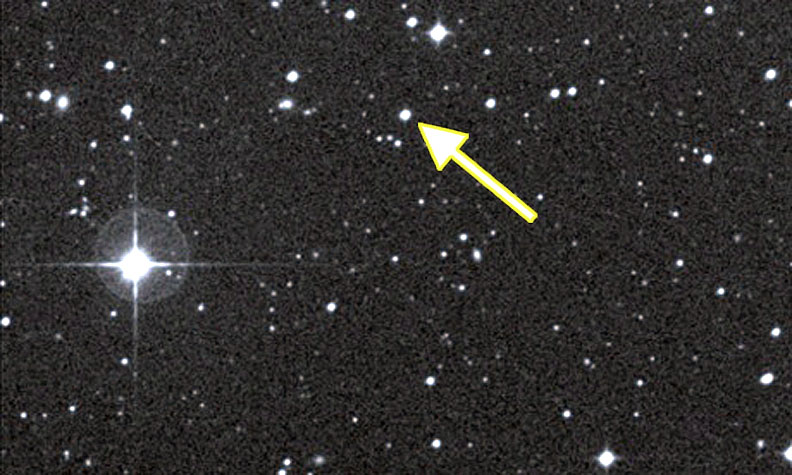
- NASA/STScI

Observation data Epoch J2000.0 Equinox J2000.0
- Constellation: Hydrus
- Right ascension: 03^{h} 13^{m} 00.36^{s}
- Declination: −67° 08′ 39.3″
- Apparent magnitude (V): 14.7

Characteristics
- Evolutionary stage: red giant

Astrometry
Distance	6000 ly (1800 pc)

Details
Surface gravity (log g)	2.3 cgs
Temperature	5,125 K
Metallicity [Fe/H]	≤ −7.1 (<3D>,nLTE) dex
Age	13.6 Gyr

Other designations
- SMSS J0313-6708, SMSS 0313−6708, SMSS J031300.36−670839.3

Database references
SIMBAD	data

SMSS J031300.36−670839.3 (shortened as SMSS J0313−6708; informally abbreviated to SM0313) is a star in the Milky Way at a distance of 6,000 ly (1,800 pc) from Earth. With an age of approximately 13.6 billion years, it is one of the oldest stars known. Another star, HD 140283, was considered to be older, but there is uncertainty in values of its age. This makes SM0313 the oldest known star with an accurate determination of its age. The star formed only about 200 million years after the Big Bang and has been shining for 13.6 billion years. The star's very low upper limit of iron of less than one ten-millionth the iron level of the Sun, suggests that it is one of the first Population II stars, formed from a gas cloud enriched by some of the first (Population III) stars. SMSS J031300.36-670839.3 also has a much higher carbon supply compared to iron, more than a thousand times greater. Apart from hydrogen, which appeared in the Big Bang, the star also contains carbon, magnesium, and calcium, which could have been formed in a low-energy supernova. Methylidyne (CH) is also detected by its absorption line. No oxygen or nitrogen has been detected. The star is a K-class red giant.

The star was discovered by a team led by Australian National University astronomers. The discovery was reported in Nature on 9 February 2014 and indicates that the supernovae of the population III stars may not have been as powerful as previously thought.

The discovery was made possible by the SkyMapper, a fully automated optical telescope at Siding Spring Observatory near Coonabarabran, New South Wales, Australia.

Elemental abundance compared to Sun
Elements	[M/H]
Lithium	0.7
Carbon	−2.6
Magnesium	−3.8
Calcium	−7

== See also ==
- HD 140283
- HE 1327-2326
- SDSS J102915+172927
- HE 1523-0901
- HE 0107-5240
- BD +17° 3248
- HD 122563
- Sneden's Star
- Cayrel's Star
- SDSS J0715-7334 an old intergalactic red giant
