= Karl-Ludwig Kratz =

German nuclear chemist and astrophysicist (1941–2025)

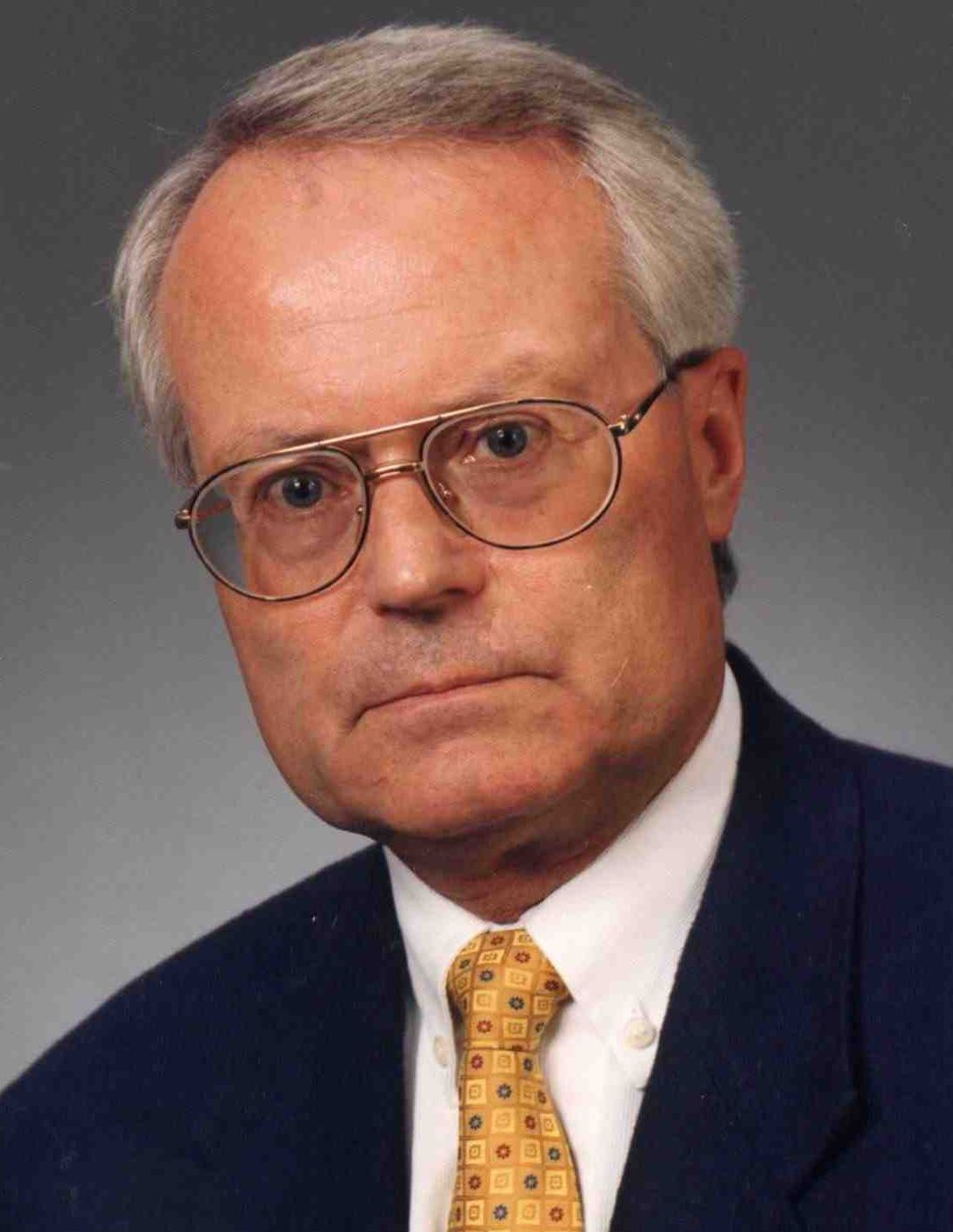
Karl-Ludwig Kratz

Karl-Ludwig Kratz (23 April 1941 – 23 March 2025) was a German nuclear chemist and astrophysicist. He was professor for nuclear chemistry at the Johannes Gutenberg University of Mainz and adjunct professor of physics at the University of Notre Dame in South Bend, Indiana.

One of Kratz's main interests was the study of nuclear structure of very neutron-rich isotopes. He concentrated on the beta-delayed neutron decay mode, especially the spectroscopy of the emitted neutrons. These isotopes are obtained by nuclear fission or proton induced spallation of heavy elements as uranium. In general, the extremely neutron-rich species of interest are produced together with an overwhelming amount of shorter-lived ones. Therefore, he developed chemical and physical separation techniques with very high chemical selectivity. These studies were performed in international collaborations at high-flux reactors (Institut Laue-Langevin, France) or accelerator facilities such as the CERN in Switzerland or the National Superconducting Cyclotron Laboratory at Michigan State University.

The nuclear structure data were also applied by Kratz to nucleosynthesis, especially the astrophysical r-process. Elemental abundances from supernova explosions were calculated in close collaboration with Friedrich-Karl Thielemann of the University of Basel. The calculated abundances were then compared to observed stellar abundances. Ultra-metal-poor Population II stars in the Galactic Halo exhibit a scaled-down Solar System r-process abundance pattern. Comparing calculated and observed abundances for elements as the stable europium with radioactive ones (thorium and uranium) the age of these stars can be determined to about 13 billion years (see Sneden's Star, Cayrel's Star, BD +17° 3248, HE 1523-0901).

In 1999 Kratz received the Nuclear Chemistry Award (now Glenn T. Seaborg Award) of the American Chemical Society. In 2014, the American Physical Society awarded him the Hans A. Bethe Prize.

Kratz died on 23 March 2025, at the age of 83.
