= SDSS J0715-7334 =

Red giant in the constellation Volans

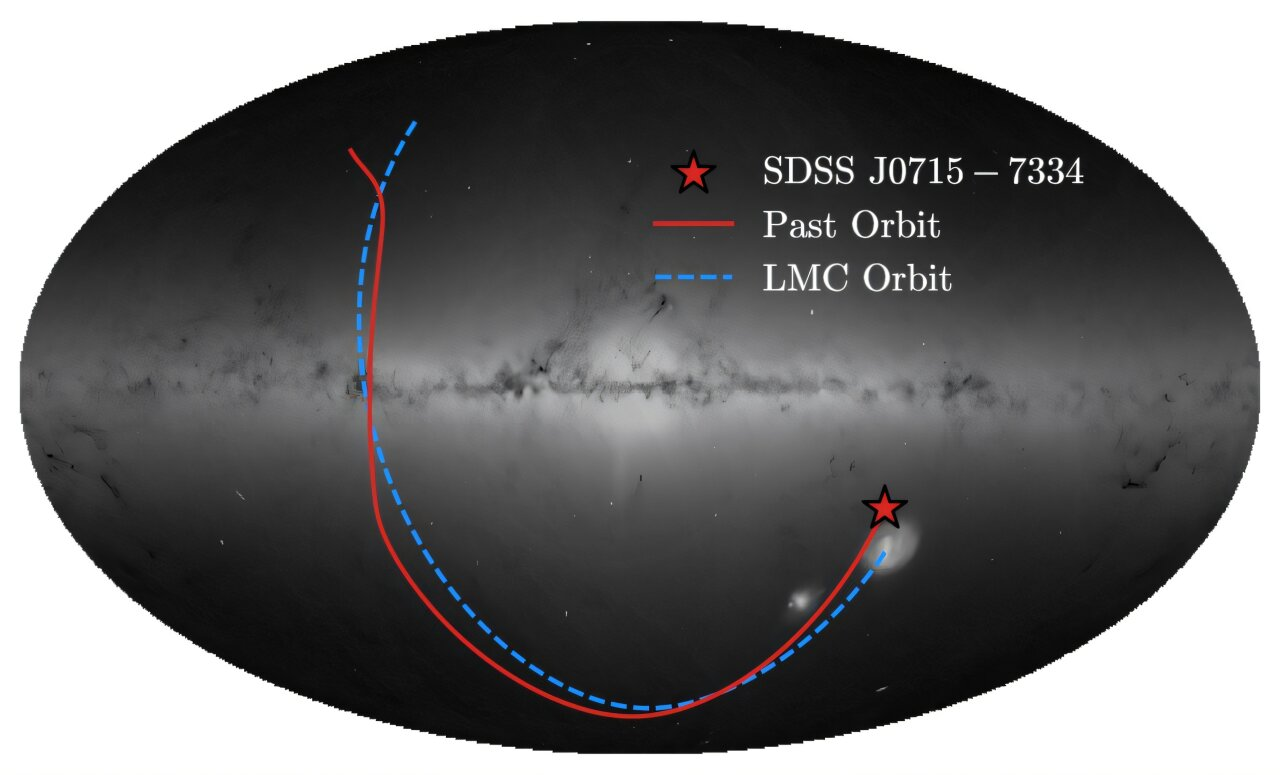
- The past orbit of J0715-7334 and the LMC in Galactic coordinates on-sky, overlaid on the distribution of all stars observed by Gaia

Observation data Epoch J2000 Equinox ICRS
- Constellation: Volans
- Right ascension: 07^{h} 15^{m} 38.595^{s}
- Declination: −73° 34′ 53.14″
- Apparent magnitude (V): 15.362

Characteristics
- Evolutionary stage: Red-giant branch

Astrometry
| Radial velocity (R_{v}) | 428.7±2.0 km/s |
| Proper motion (μ) | RA: +3.767 mas/yr Dec.: +2.627 mas/yr |
| Distance | 85129+4892 −5219 ly (26100+1500 −1600 pc) |
| Absolute magnitude (M_{V}) | −2.0 (Note: Calculated from apparent magnitude 15.362, distance modules 16.9, and extinction 0.503) |

Details
| Mass | 0.78 M_{☉} |
| Radius | 21 R_{☉} |
| Luminosity | 1,117 (Note: Calculated from apparent G magnitude 14.995, distance modulus 16.9, G-band extinction 0.397, and G-band bolometric correction −0.568) L_{☉} |
| Surface gravity (log g) | 1.10±0.25 cgs |
| Temperature | 4,700±100 K |
| Metallicity [Fe/H] | −4.53±0.2 dex |
| Age | 12.8 - 13.0 Gyr |

Other designations
- SDSS_ID 95803549, 2MASS J07153858-7334530, WISEA J071538.58-733453.0, Gaia DR3 5262850721755411072

Database references
| SIMBAD | data |

SDSS J0715-7334 is an old population II star located in the Milky Way's halo, 26.1 kpc from Earth, within the constellation Volans. It's chemical composition has remained virtually unchanged since the early universe.

The object is an old, single red giant. It has an effective temperature of 4700 K, a surface gravity of 1.1 cgs, a very low metallicity of −4.53 dex, and estimates of its age range from 12.8 to 13 billion years.

== Discovery ==
The initial detection of the object occurred in 2014 when astrophysicist Kevin Schlaufman from Johns Hopkins University was analyzing archival photometric data obtained as part of the Baryon Oscillation Spectroscopic Survey. Based on specific color indices, the star was classified as a candidate for an extremely metal-poor object and included in the pool of targets for a subsequent spectroscopic survey by the fifth generation Sloan Digital Sky Survey.

In the spring of 2025, the SDSS-V database was integrated into the curriculum at the University of Chicago. Professor Alexander Ji incorporated the candidate lists into a practical course on "Field Astrophysics" for undergraduate students. A group of ten students, during their data analysis, filtered the dataset and formed a sample of 77 of the most promising stars.

On March 21, 2025, during spring break, the research group conducted a series of observations at the Las Campanas Observatory in Chile. High-resolution spectroscopic data were obtained using the 6.5-meter Magellan "Clay" Telescope and the Magellan Inamori Kyocera Echelle (MIKE) spectrograph. An initial analysis of a three-hour exposure revealed an almost complete absence of metal absorption spectral lines. The students' subsequent academic quarter was reoriented towards processing and modeling the obtained spectrogram. The research results were submitted for publication and published in the scientific journal Nature Astronomy.

== Stellar Origin ==
An analysis of spatial velocities and trajectory parameters, conducted using data from the European Space Telescope Gaia, revealed the extragalactic nature of the object. It was established that the star's motion vector and the parameters of its highly eccentric orbit are spatially and dynamically linked to the Large Magellanic Cloud (LMC).

The star formed in the LMC's halo during an early epoch of the universe's existence. Subsequently, as a result of tidal gravitational interaction between galaxies, the Milky Way captured the object from its parent system, transferring it to an elongated orbit within its own halo.

== Chemical Composition and Metallicity ==
The total metal content in SDSS J0715−7334 is less than 0.005% of that of the Sun. The absolute mass fraction is estimated as Z <7.8×10^{−7}, or 0.8 parts per million. The star is approximately 20,000 times chemically purer than the Sun and at least 2 times poorer in metals than the previous record holder for total metallicity, SDSS J1029+1729. The star consists almost entirely of primordial hydrogen and helium formed during the Big Bang.

The iron concentration is 20,000 times lower than solar, measuring [Fe/H] = −4.3. This value indicates that the star formed in an era preceding the massive Type Ia supernova explosions, which are the main suppliers of iron in the Universe. This value is approximately 40 times lower than that of most other known ultra-iron-poor stars. Although there is a star with an even lower partial iron content, SMSS J0313–6708, where iron is 10 times less, its total metallicity is still significantly higher due to a colossal excess of carbon. SDSS J0715−7334 exhibits an extreme deficit across all elements simultaneously.

At the same time, the carbon content is 30,000 times less than the Sun, measuring [C/Fe] < −0.2. During the rapid analysis, the carbon lines were so weak that they were initially almost indistinguishable on the spectrogram. This deficit is recognized as the object's main cosmological anomaly. The vast majority of known old stars exhibit a pronounced excess of carbon relative to iron, as carbon compounds acted as the primary coolants, lowering the temperature of protostellar clouds to enable their gravitational collapse. The near-complete absence of carbon in SDSS J0715−7334 suggests the existence of other, less studied cooling channels for matter in the early Universe – for example, through silicate or other cosmic dust ejected by the first supernovae.

In addition to iron and carbon, only minimal traces of alpha-process elements, such as magnesium, calcium, and titanium were detected in the star's spectrum. The ratio of these elements to iron allowed astrophysicists to mathematically model nucleosynthesis within the progenitor star's core. It has been established that this entire unique chemical fingerprint was formed as a result of a single, high-energy explosion of just one Population III star with an initial mass of about 25-35 M_{☉}. It completed its evolution as a powerful supernova with a high explosion energy of around 5×10^{51} ergs, possessing unusually high ejecta force and velocity. The gas from this point-like ejection mixed very little with the matter of other stars, immediately collapsing into the ultra-pure red giant SDSS J0715−7334.

== See also ==
- SMSS J031300.36−670839.3
- Caffau's Star
- HE 1327−2326
