= Roger Cayrel =

French astronomer (1925–2021)

Roger Victor Émile Cayrel (4 December 1925 – 11 January 2021) was a French astronomer. His main interests were stellar atmospheres, galactic chemical evolution and metal-poor stars.

== Biography ==
Born in Bordeaux, France, he attended the Lycée Michel-Montaigne in Bordeaux and studied physics at the École normale supérieure and the Faculté des sciences de Paris.

Beside his scientific work, he had a number of high-ranking posts in the management of science: director of the Canada-France-Hawaii Telescope (CFHT, 1974–1980), president of the IAU commission on stellar atmospheres (1973–1976) and head of the Bureau des Longitudes (1995–1996).

Cayrel was a corresponding member of the Académie des Sciences from 1988 to 2021. He was awarded the Prix Jules Janssen of the Société astronomique de France (Astronomical Society of France), in 2001.

Cayrel and his colleagues discovered thorium and uranium in the ultra-metal-poor halo star BPS CS31082-0001, which was named Cayrel's Star to honour him. From the thorium and uranium content, an age of 12.5 Billion years could be calculated.

Since 1954, he was married to the Italian astronomer Giusa de Strobel.

== Sources ==
- Cayrel, R.; Hill, V.; Beers, T. C.; Barbuy, B.; Spite, M.; Spite, F.; Plez, B.; Andersen, J.; Bonifacio, P.; François, P.; Molaro, P.; Nordström, B.; Primas, F., Measurement of stellar age from uranium decay, Nature, Volume 409, Issue 6821, pp. 691–692 (2001)
- Jugaku, Jun. "The Publications And Citations Of Giusa And Roger Cayrel", Astrophysics and Space Science 265, 3(1999).
