= PicII-503 =

Star in Pictor II dwarf galaxy

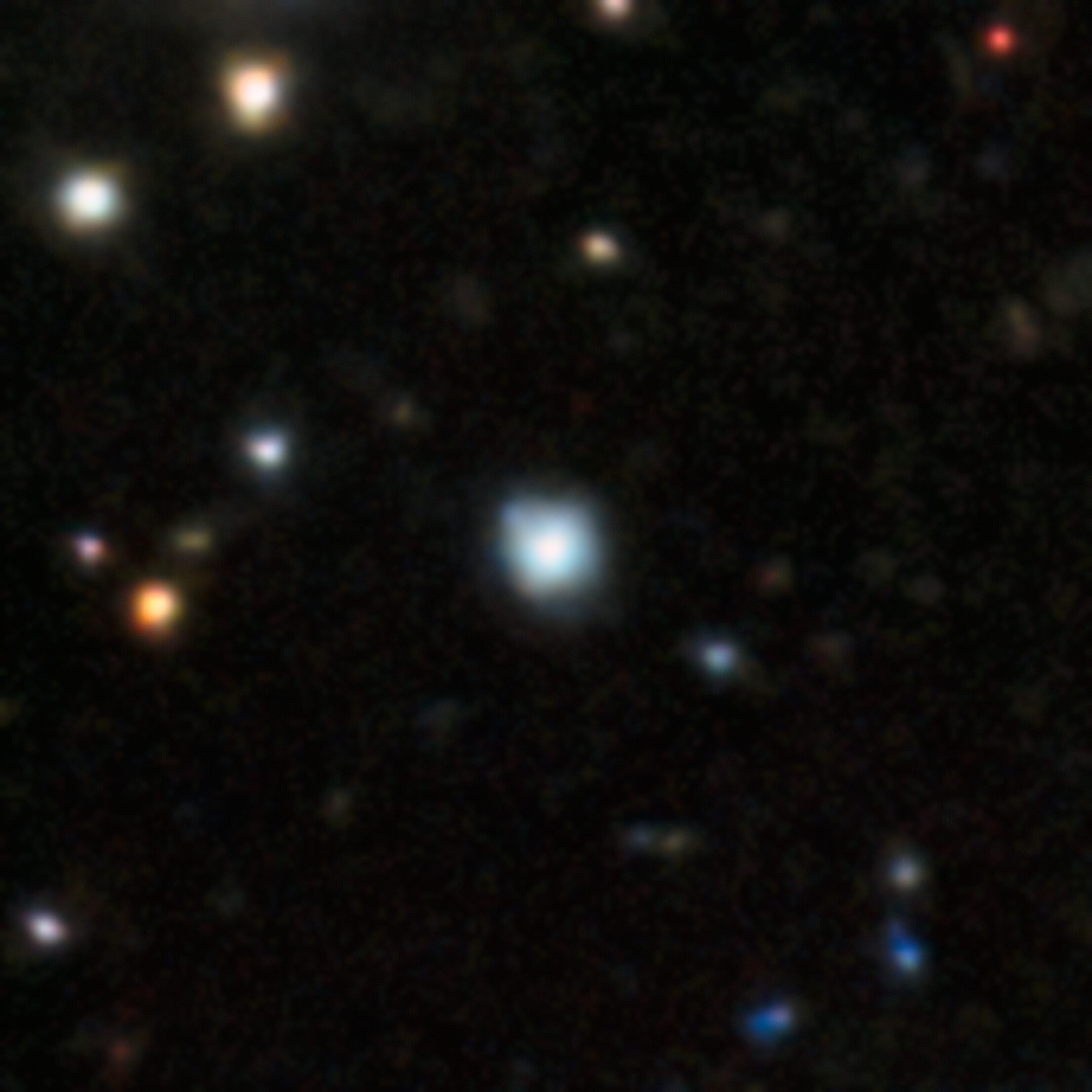
- Object type: Red giant, population II star
- Other designations: USNO-A2.0 0225-03197987, Gaia DR1 5480105831331104384, Gaia DR2 5480105831331104384, Gaia DR3 5480105831331104384

Observation data (Epoch J2000)
- Constellation: Pictor
- Right ascension: 06^{h} 43^{m} 59.01^{s}
- Declination: −60° 08′ 25″
- Distance: 150,000 ly (46,000 pc)
- Apparent magnitude: 20.35
- Related media on Wikimedia Commons

PicII-503 is an extremely rare, ultra-metal-poor star in the dwarf galaxy Pictor II. It is located at around 150,000 light-years away from Earth, in the southern constellation of Pictor. It was believed to have formed from the material enriched by one of the earliest generation of stars in the universe, making it one of the most chemically primitive stars ever known, with an estimated age of more than 10 billion years old.

The star was discovered by Anirudh Chiti and the MAGIC Survey Collaboration with data taken in 2024, using the Dark Energy Camera (DECam), mounted on the 4-meter Víctor M. Blanco Telescope, at the Cerro Tololo Inter-American Observatory (CTIO), Chile. The incredibly low amounts of elements heavier than helium shows evidence about the chemical composition of the early universe and the first generation of stars. The discovery of PicII-503 demonstrated that an extreme overproduction of carbon is one pathway by which initial element production can occur in early galaxies.

== See also ==
- Stellar population
- Metallicity
- List of oldest stars
