= Olalla Vazquez =

Spanish biochemist

Olalla Vázquez (born 1981) is a professor of chemical biology in the chemistry department at the University of Marburg.

== Personal life and education ==
Vázquez was born in Chantada, her parents' homeland, but moved to Pontevedra when she was 4 years old. She studied at IES Valle-Inclán and graduated in chemistry, with honors, from the University of Santiago de Compostela in 2004. In 2005, she received the FPU fellowship granted by the Spanish Ministry of Education and Science for PhD students. During her PhD, she worked on the design and synthesis of new specific binders and fluorescent probes for DNA recognition under the supervision of Prof. José Luis Mascareñas and Prof. Eugenio Vázquez. In the course of her predoctoral studies, she made two stays as a visiting PhD student: one at Harvard University, in the group of Prof. Gregory L. Verdine in 2006, and another at Humboldt Universität zu Berlin, in the group of Prof. Oliver Seitz in 2008. In 2010, she defended her PhD dissertation, obtaining Summa cum laude.

== Career ==
She received the Marie Curie postdoctoral research fellowship and returned to the group of Oliver Seitz to explore the possibilities of using RNA template-directed reactions to synthesize cytotoxic peptides in the context of cancer therapy. In the summer of 2014, she was appointed to a newly established tenure-track Assistant Professorship (W1) at Philipps-Universität Marburg, where she was entrusted with the mission of managing the new division of chemical biology with Prof. Eric Meggers. In April 2020, Olalla successfully passed her tenured evaluation, and consequently, she was promoted to Associate Professor of Chemical Biology (W2) in January 2021. In 2022, Olalla was offered a Full Professorship for Organic Chemistry for Protein Research at the Paris Lodron University of Salzburg, which was declined for a Full Professorship at Philipps-Universität Marburg. Since 2023, Olalla is officially Full Professor of Chemical Biology (W3).

== Service for the community ==
She is committed to fostering equity, diversity and inclusion in science and committed to science education. Together with Prof. Carla Fröhlich (American Cottrell Scholar), both teacher-scholar ensured lead Building Bridges Workshop to support new faculty members in Germany.

She is a member of the CheBio Steering Committees: EFMC Chemical Biology Initiative DECHEMA GDCh Chemical Biology EuChemS Chemistry in Life Science

== Important publications ==
- Zhang, L.; Xiulan, X.; Djokovic, N.; Nikolic, K.; Kosenkov, D.; Abendroth, F.*; Vázquez. O.* Reversible Control of RNA Splicing by Photoswitchable Small Molecules; J. Am. Chem. Soc. 2023, 145, 12783 – 12792
- Albert, L.; Nagpal, J.; Steinchen, W.; Zhang, L.; Werel, L.; Djokovic N.; Ruzic, D.; Hoffarth, M.; Xu, J.; Kaspareit, J.; Abendroth, F.; Royant, A.; Bange, G.; Nikolic, K.; Ryu, S.; Dou, Y.; Essen, L.-O.; Vázquez, O.* Bistable photoswitch allows in vivo control of hematopoiesis; ACS Cent. Sci. 2022, 8, 57 – 66.
- Linden, G.; Zhang, L.; Pieck, F.; Linne, U.; Kosenkov, D.; Tonner, R.; Vázquez, O.* Conditional singlet oxygen generation via DNA-targeted tetrazine bioorthogonal reaction; Angew. Chem. Int. Ed. Engl., 2019, 58, 12868 – 12873
- Schulte, L. N.; Heinrich, B.; Janga, H.; Schmeck, B. T; Vázquez, O*. A far-red fluorescent DNA binder enables interaction studies of live multidrug-resistant pathogens and host cells; Angew. Chem. Int. Ed. Engl., 2018, 57, 11564 – 11568
- Albert, L.; Xu, J.; Wan, R.; Srinivasan, V.; Dou, Y. Vázquez, O.* Controlled inhibition of methyltransferases using photoswitchable peptide-mimetics: towards an epigenetic regulation of leukemia; Chem. Sci., 2017, 8, 4612 – 4618.
