= Sneden's Star =

Star in the constellation Aquarius

Observation data Epoch J2000 Equinox ICRS
- Constellation: Aquarius
- Right ascension: 22^{h} 17^{m} 01.65585^{s}
- Declination: −16° 39′ 27.0519″
- Apparent magnitude (V): 13.21

Characteristics
- Evolutionary stage: giant
- Spectral type: KIIvw
- B−V color index: 0.78

Astrometry
Radial velocity (R_{v})	+13.0 km/s
Proper motion (μ)	RA: 12.321 mas/yr Dec.: −6.493 mas/yr
Parallax (π)	0.1868±0.0440 mas
Distance	approx. 17,000 ly (approx. 5,000 pc)
Absolute magnitude (M_{V})	−0.23

Details
Mass	1.13 M_{☉}
Radius	13.8 R_{☉}
Luminosity	158 L_{☉}
Surface gravity (log g)	1.15 cgs
Temperature	4,690 K
Metallicity [Fe/H]	−3.19 dex
Age	14.2±3 Gyr

Other designations
- BPS CS 22892-0052, HE 2214-1654

Database references
SIMBAD	data

BPS CS22892-0052 (Sneden's Star) is an old population II star located at a distance of 4.7 kiloparsecs (15,000 light-years) in the Milky Way's galactic halo. It belongs to a class of ultra-metal-poor stars (metallicity [Fe/H]=-3.1), specifically the very rare subclass of neutron-capture (r-process) enhanced stars. It was discovered by Tim C. Beers and collaborators with the Curtis Schmidt telescope at the Cerro Tololo Inter-American Observatory in Chile. Extended high-resolution spectroscopic observations since around 1995 (with Chris Sneden from the University of Texas at Austin as the leading observer) allowed observers to determine the abundances of 53 chemical elements in this star, as of December 2005 only second in number to the Sun.

From barium (Z=56) on, all elements show the pattern of the r-process contribution to the abundances of the elements in the Solar System. Comparing the observed abundances for a stable element such as europium (Z=63) and the radioactive element thorium (Z=90) to calculated abundances of an r-process in a type II supernova explosion (as from the universities at Mainz and Basel groups of Karl-Ludwig Kratz and Friedrich-Karl Thielemann) have allowed observers to determine the age of this star to be about 14 billion years. Similar ages have been derived for other ultra-metal-poor stars (CS31082-001, BD+17°3248 and HE 1523-0901) from thorium-to-uranium ratios.

== Sources ==
- Beers, T. C.; Preston, G. W.; Shectman, S. A. (October 1985). "A search for stars of very low metal abundance. I". The Astronomical Journal. 90: 2089–2102. Bibcode:1985AJ.....90.2089B. doi:10.1086/113917.
- Beers, Timothy C.; Preston, George W.; Shectman, Stephen A. (June 1992). "A search for stars of very low metal abundance. II". The Astronomical Journal. 103: 1987–2034. Bibcode:1992AJ....103.1987B. doi:10.1086/116207.
- Kratz, Karl-Ludwig; Bitouzet, Jean-Philippe; et al. (January 1993). "Isotopic r-process abundances and nuclear structure far from stability - Implications for the r-process mechanism". The Astrophysical Journal. 403: 216–238. Bibcode:1993ApJ...403..216K. doi:10.1086/172196. ISSN 0004-637X.
- Sneden, Christopher; McWilliam, Andrew; et al. (August 1996). "The Extremely Metal-Poor, Neutron-Capture-Rich Star CS 22892-052: A Comprehensive Abundance Analysis" (PDF). The Astrophysical Journal. 467: 819. Bibcode:1996ApJ...467..819S. doi:10.1086/177656. ISSN 0004-637X.
- Cowan, John J.; Pfeiffer, B.; et al. (August 1999). "R-Process Abundances and Chronometers in Metal-Poor Stars". The Astrophysical Journal. 521 (1): 194–205. arXiv:astro-ph/9808272. Bibcode:1999ApJ...521..194C. doi:10.1086/307512. ISSN 0004-637X.
