= J1010+2358 =

Metal-poor star

J1010+2358 is a very metal-poor star, found in the Galactic halo. It has unusual odd-even mass elements and may be formed from a supernova of a large primordial star.

It has a reported metallicity [Fe/H] = − 2.4. (Within the -1 -> -3 range of Population II stars.)

== See also ==
- Population III – Grouping of stars by similar metallicity
