= Elisabetta Caffau =

Professional astronomer

Elisabetta Caffau is an astronomer who discovered a 13-billion-year-old, low mass, dwarf star named SDSS J102915+172927, or Caffau's Star in 2011. She earned a PhD in observational astronomy from the Paris Observatory in 2009 and completed a one-year post-doctoral program there as well. She received the Gliese fellowship Grant in 2010 and was awarded the Merac Prize for the Best Early Career Researcher by the European Astronomical Society in 2013.
