= List of oldest stars =

The age of the oldest known stars approaches the age of the universe, about 13.8 billion years. Some of these are among the first stars from reionization (the stellar dawn), ending the Dark Ages about 370,000 years after the Big Bang. This list includes stars older than 12 billion years, or about 87% of the age of the universe.

== List ==
Name	Age (billions of years)	Mass (M_{☉})	Temperature (K)	Distance (ly)	Location	Notes
HD 140283	14.2±0.4	0.75	5,787±48	200.5	Milky Way halo	Agrees with the age of the Universe within one standard deviation.
2MASS J22132050-5137385	13.6±2.6	0.80±0.08	5,509	6,560^{+260}_{−330}	Milky Way	
2MASS J18082002−5104378	13.53	~0.8	5,440 ± 100	1,950	Milky Way thin disk	
SMSS J031300.36−670839.3	13.4	~0.75	5,125	6,000	Milky Way halo or Globular clusters	
SDSS J0715-7334	12.8 - 13.0	0.78	4,700±100	85129+4892 −5219	Milky Way halo	Born near the Large Magellanic Cloud
TOI-157	12.82+0.73 −1.40	0.948^{+0.023}_{−0.018}	5,629	1,181±9	Milky Way	Has one exoplanet
Mu Cassiopeiae	12.7±2.7	Primary: 0.7440±0.0122 Secondary: 0.1728±0.0035	Primary: 5306±31 Secondary: 3025	25.03±0.08	Milky Way	Possibly the oldest star visible to the naked eye.
PSR B1620−26	12.7–11.2	1.35		12,400	Globular cluster Messier 4	Host star of one of the oldest exoplanets.
Gliese 414	12.4±5.2	0.65	Primary: 4120±109 Secondary: 3663±70	38.7	Milky Way disk	Host two exoplanets
BD+44 493	12.1–13.2	0.83^{+0.09}_{−0.05}		666.3^{+3.59}_{−3.26}	Milky Way disk	
HR 5455	12±1	1.32±0.05	6,341±70	87.7		
PicII-503	>10			150,000	Pictor II	Classified as a second-generation (Population II) star.
