= Carla Fröhlich =

Swiss and American nuclear astrophysicist

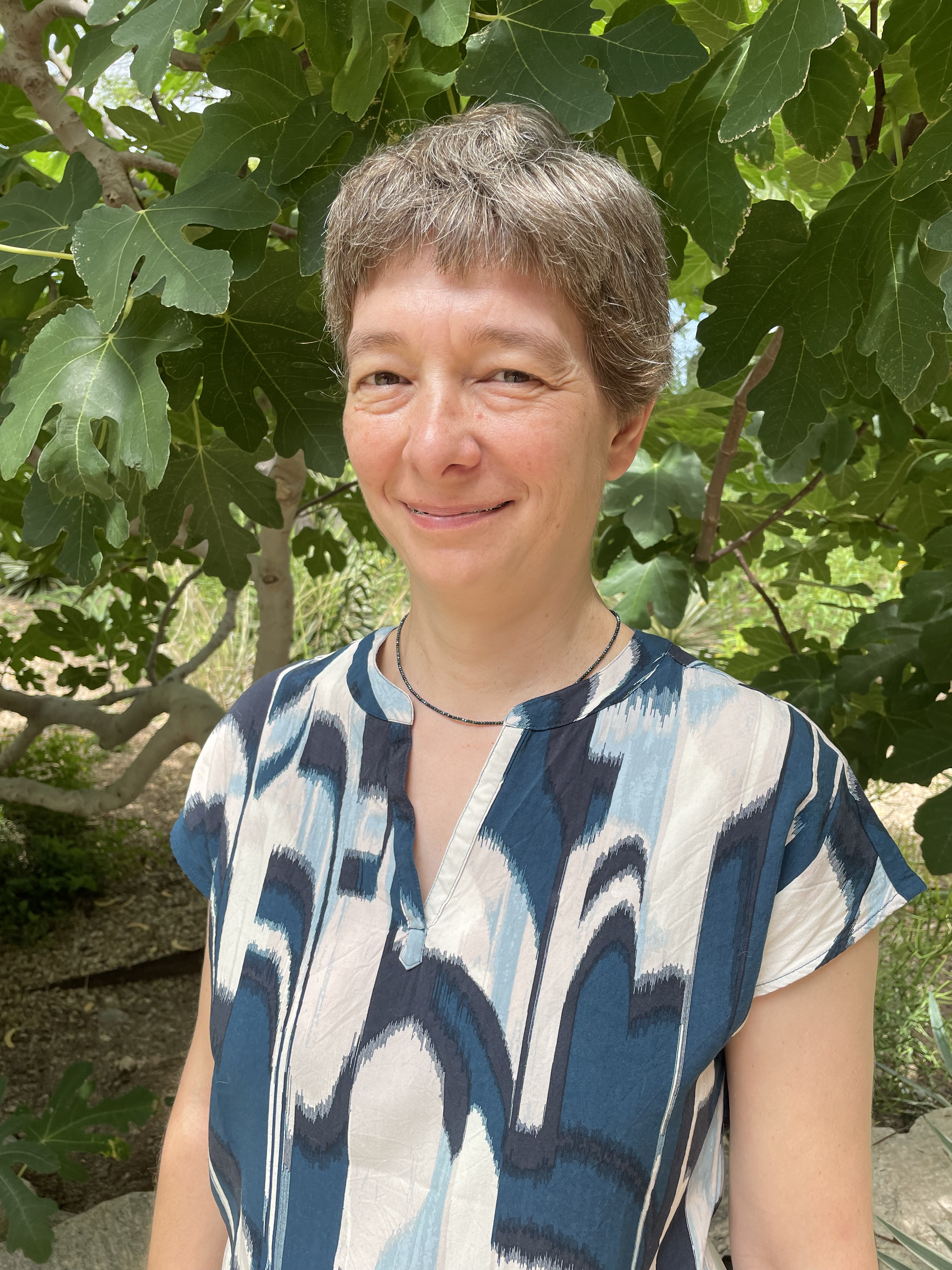
- Carla Fröhlich at the Cottrell Scholar Conference in 2026
- Education: University of Basel
- Scientific career
- Fields: Astrophysics
- Institutions: North Carolina State University
- Doctoral advisor: Friedrich-Karl Thielemann
- Website: physics.sciences.ncsu.edu/people/cfrohli/

Carla Fröhlich is a Swiss and American nuclear astrophysicist whose research has included the neutrino p-process for nucleosynthesis in supernovae, and the study of multi-messenger astronomy. She is a professor of physics and University Faculty Scholar at North Carolina State University.

== Education ==
Fröhlich studied physics and computer science as an undergraduate at the University of Basel, earning a diploma there in 2003. She earned a PhD in theoretical physics at the University of Basel in 2007. Her dissertation, The Role of Neutrinos in Explosive Nucleosynthesis in Core Collapse Supernova Models with Neutrino Transport, was supervised by Friedrich-Karl Thielemann.

== Career and research ==
Fröhlich conducted postdoctoral research as an Enrico Fermi Postdoctoral Fellow at the University of Chicago Department of Astronomy and Astrophysics, the Enrico Fermi Institute, and the Kavli Institute for Cosmological Physics.

Fröhlich joined the faculty at North Carolina State University in 2010. In her research, she develops computer simulations to understand nuclear reactions in stars and supernovae. These reactions produce heavier chemical elements like calcium and iron.

In 2013, the Financial Times hailed Fröhlich as one of the "next big names in physics" and cited her discovery of "the neutrino p-process, which helps explain and predict the behavior of certain stars."

In 2022, Fröhlich was named a Fellow of the American Physical Society (APS), after a nomination from the APS Division of Nuclear Physics, "for seminal contributions to nuclear and neutrino astrophysics, in particular to the understanding of supernovae, their nucleosynthesis, and the neutrino-p process, and for developing predictive models of supernova messengers".

Her impact on the field of astrophysics includes her discoveries as well as her teaching and mentoring of early-career researchers. For example, she co-organized a Fulbright Program-Cottrell workshop to "train the next generation of university faculty to be both teachers and scholars."

=== Honors and awards ===
- 2007: Dissertation prize of the Swiss Physical Society
- 2013: United States Department of Energy Early Career Award
- 2014: Research Corporation Cottrell Scholar
- 2015: Research Corporation Scialog Fellow in Time Domain Astrophysics
- 2019: Outstanding Teacher Award and Academy of Outstanding Teachers of North Carolina State University
- 2022: Alumni Association Distinguished Undergraduate Professor of North Carolina State University
- 2022: Fellow of the American Physical Society (APS)
