= James W. Truran =

American physicist (1940–2022)

James Wellington Truran Jr. (born July 12, 1940, Brewster, New York – March 5, 2022) was an American physicist, known for his research in nuclear astrophysics.

== Biography ==
Truran graduated in 1961 with a bachelor's degree from Cornell University. In 1966 he received his PhD in physics from Yale University. His PhD thesis entitled Thermonuclear reactions in supernova shock waves was supervised by Alastair Cameron. As a postdoc Truran was from 1965 to 1967 a research associate at NASA's Goddard Institute for Space Studies. At the physics department of Yeshiva University he was from 1967 to 1970 an assistant professor, from 1970 to 1972 an associate professor, and from 1972 to 1973 a full professor. For the academic year 1968–1969 he was a research fellow in physics at California Institute of Technology. From 1973 to 1991 he was a full professor of astronomy at the University of Illinois Urbana-Champaign. For the academic year 1979–1980 he was a Guggenheim Fellow and held a visiting position at the Institute of Astronomy, Cambridge. With the aid of a Humboldt Research Award he spent the academic year 1986–1987 at the Max Planck Institute for Astrophysics. In 1991 he became a professor in the department of astronomy and astrophysics at the University of Chicago, where he retired as professor emeritus.

He did important research on "novae, supernovae, nucleosynthesis, and galactic chemical evolution through the application of nuclear physics to astrophysics." His Ph.D. thesis and subsequent research led to accurate prediction of the production of the ^{56}Ni in Type Ia supernovae. Radioactive decay of ^{56}Ni through ^{56}Co to ^{56}Fe produces high-energy photons, which dominate the energy output of Type Ia supernova ejecta at intermediate to late times.

Truran's research includes s-processes in stars, carbon explosion models of Type Ia supernovae, and r-processes in metal-poor stars. He was involved in the development of the FLASH simulation code for thermonuclear supernova explosions.

He was elected in 1987 a fellow of the American Physical Society and in 1995 a fellow of the American Academy of Arts and Sciences. From 1985 to 1988 he was the vice president of the board of trustees of the Aspen Center for Physics.

Truran was a member of the AURA "HST and Beyond" Committee, which in 2017 received the Carl Sagan Memorial Award. In 2020, he received the Laboratory Astrophysics Prize of the American Astronomical Society's Laboratory Astrophysics Division (LAD) "for his theoretical work on early star formation and the nucleosynthesis history of the universe, as well as for his seminal contributions to the study of astrophysical thermonuclear explosions, nucleosynthesis, and the use of nuclear-decay chronometers to determine ages of stellar and terrestrial matter." He was awarded in 2021 the Hans A. Bethe Prize for "distinguished contributions across the breadth of nuclear astrophysics, Galactic chemical evolution and cosmochronology."

Upon his death he was survived by his widow, three daughters, four grandchildren, and one great-grandchild.

== Selected publications ==
=== Articles ===
- Truran, J. W.; Cameron, A.G.W. (1971). "Evolutionary Models of Nucleosynthesis in the Galaxy". International Astronomical Union Colloquium. 10: 179–222. doi:10.1017/S025292110002858X.
- Starrfield, Sumner; Truran, J. W.; Sparks, Warren M.; Kutter, G. S. (1972). "CNO Abundances and Hydrodynamic Models of the Nova Outburst". The Astrophysical Journal. 176: 169. Bibcode:1972ApJ...176..169S. doi:10.1086/151619.
- Cameron, A.G.W.; Truran, J.W. (1977). "The supernova trigger for formation of the solar system". Icarus. 30 (3): 447–461. Bibcode:1977Icar...30..447C. doi:10.1016/0019-1035(77)90101-4.
- Iben, I. Jr.; Truran, J. W. (1978). "On the surface composition of thermally pulsing stars of high luminosity and on the contribution of such stars to the element enrichment of the interstellar medium". The Astrophysical Journal. 220: 980. Bibcode:1978ApJ...220..980I. doi:10.1086/155986.
- Truran, J. W. (1981). "A new interpretation of the heavy element abundances in metal-deficient stars". Astronomy and Astrophysics. 97: 391–393. Bibcode:1981A&A....97..391T.
- Iben, I. Jr.; Kaler, J. B.; Truran, J. W.; Renzini, A. (1983). "On the evolution of those nuclei of planetary nebulae that experience a final helium shell flash". The Astrophysical Journal. 264: 605. Bibcode:1983ApJ...264..605I. doi:10.1086/160631.
- Wheeler, J. Craig; Sneden, Christopher; Truran, James W. (1989). "Abundance Ratios as a Function of Metallicity". Annual Review of Astronomy and Astrophysics. 27: 279–349. Bibcode:1989ARA&A..27..279W. doi:10.1146/annurev.aa.27.090189.001431.
- Cowan, John J.; Thielemann, Friedrich-Karl; Truran, James W. (1991). "The R-process and nucleochronology". Physics Reports. 208 (4–5): 267–394. Bibcode:1991PhR...208..267C. doi:10.1016/0370-1573(91)90070-3.
- Cowan, John J.; Thielemann, Friedrich-Karl; Truran, James W. (1991). "Radioactive Dating of the Elements". Annual Review of Astronomy and Astrophysics. 29: 447–497. Bibcode:1991ARA&A..29..447C. doi:10.1146/annurev.aa.29.090191.002311.
- Gehrz, Robert D.; Truran, James W.; Williams, Robert E.; Starrfield, Sumner (1998). "Nucleosynthesis in Classical Novae and Its Contribution to the Interstellar Medium". Publications of the Astronomical Society of the Pacific. 110 (743): 3–26. Bibcode:1998PASP..110....3G. doi:10.1086/316107. S2CID 121557552.
- Burles, Scott; Nollett, Kenneth M.; Truran, James W.; Turner, Michael S. (1999). "Sharpening the Predictions of Big-Bang Nucleosynthesis". Physical Review Letters. 82 (21): 4176–4179. arXiv:astro-ph/9901157. Bibcode:1999PhRvL..82.4176B. doi:10.1103/PhysRevLett.82.4176. S2CID 119351835.
- Fryxell, B.; Olson, K.; Ricker, P.; Timmes, F. X.; Zingale, M.; Lamb, D. Q.; MacNeice, P.; Rosner, R.; Truran, J. W.; Tufo, H. (2000). "FLASH: An Adaptive Mesh Hydrodynamics Code for Modeling Astrophysical Thermonuclear Flashes". The Astrophysical Journal Supplement Series. 131 (1): 273–334. Bibcode:2000ApJS..131..273F. doi:10.1086/317361. S2CID 120162147.
- Cowan, John J.; Sneden, Christopher; Burles, Scott; Ivans, Inese I.; Beers, Timothy C.; Truran, James W.; Lawler, James E.; Primas, Francesca; Fuller, George M.; Pfeiffer, Bernd; Kratz, Karl-Ludwig (2002). "The Chemical Composition and Age of the Metal-poor Halo Star BD +17o3248". The Astrophysical Journal. 572 (2): 861–879. arXiv:astro-ph/0202429. Bibcode:2002ApJ...572..861C. doi:10.1086/340347. S2CID 119503888.
- Sneden, Christopher; Cowan, John J.; Lawler, James E.; Ivans, Inese I.; Burles, Scott; Beers, Timothy C.; Primas, Francesca; Hill, Vanessa; Truran, James W.; Fuller, George M.; Pfeiffer, Bernd; Kratz, Karl-Ludwig (2003). "The Extremely Metal-poor, Neutron Capture–rich Star CS 22892-052: A Comprehensive Abundance Analysis". The Astrophysical Journal. 591 (2): 936–953. arXiv:astro-ph/0303542. Bibcode:2003ApJ...591..936S. doi:10.1086/375491. S2CID 11466782.
- Timmes, F. X.; Brown, Edward F.; Truran, J. W. (2003). "On Variations in the Peak Luminosity of Type Ia Supernovae". The Astrophysical Journal. 590 (2): L83 – L86. arXiv:astro-ph/0305114. Bibcode:2003ApJ...590L..83T. doi:10.1086/376721. S2CID 18678325.

=== Books ===
- Arnett, W. David; Truran, James W., eds. (1985). Nucleosynthesis: Challenges and New Development. University of Chicago Press. ISBN 0226027872.
- Niemeyer, Jens C.; Truran, J. W., eds. (2000). Type Ia Supernovae: Theory and Cosmology. Cambridge University Press. ISBN 0521126533.
