= 2MASS J22132050−5137385 =

Oldest star in the known universe

Observation data Epoch J2000 Equinox J2000
- Constellation: Grus
- Right ascension: 22^{h} 13^{m} 20.4895^{s}
- Declination: −51° 37′ 38.689″
- Apparent magnitude (V): 11.630

Astrometry
Radial velocity (R_{v})	117.5±0.3 km/s
Proper motion (μ)	RA: +7.012 mas/yr Dec.: −17.524 mas/yr
Parallax (π)	0.4647±0.0186 mas
Distance	7,000 ± 300 ly (2,150 ± 90 pc)

Details
Surface gravity (log g)	2.28±0.06 cgs
Temperature	5,509 K
Metallicity [Fe/H]	−2.20±0.12 dex

Other designations
- TYC 8444-76-1

Database references
SIMBAD	data

2MASS J22132050−5137385 is a contender for the oldest star in the known universe, with an approximated age of 13.6±2.6 billion years. It is located within the Milky Way galaxy, between 6,230 and 6,820 light years away from Earth in the constellation of Grus. It has a mass 0.80±0.08 that of the Sun. Due to its age, it is likely among the first stars from reionization (the stellar dawn), ending the Dark Ages about 370,000 years after the Big Bang.
