= HE 0107−5240 =

Extremely metal poor star in the constellation Phoenix

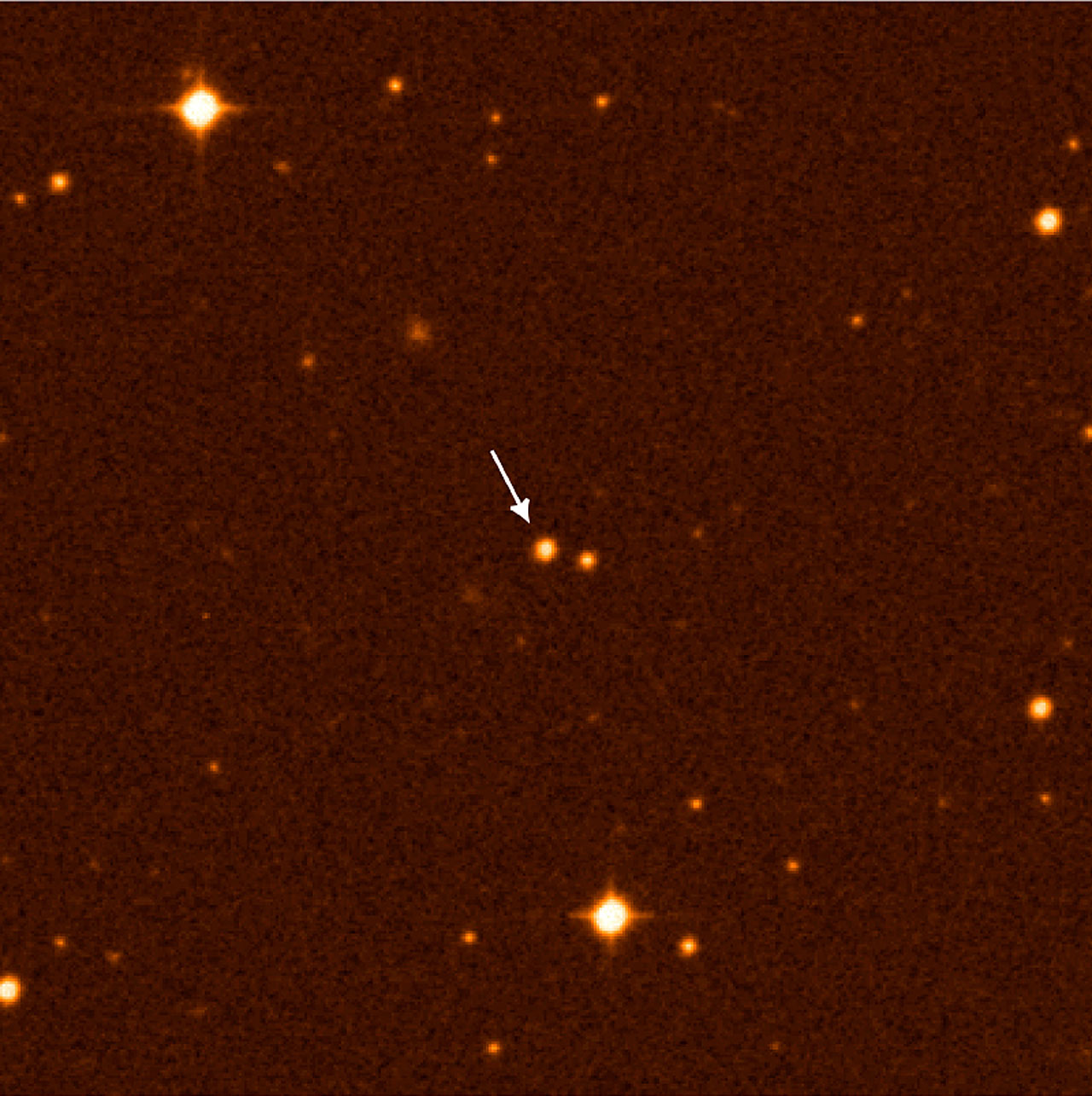
- The ultra-metal-poor star HE0107−5240

Observation data Epoch J2000.0 Equinox J2000.0 (ICRS)
- Constellation: Phoenix
- Right ascension: 01^{h} 09^{m} 29.1556^{s}
- Declination: −52° 24′ 34.202″
- Apparent magnitude (V): 15.07

Astrometry
| Radial velocity (R_{v}) | 46.6±0.1 km/s |
| Proper motion (μ) | RA: +2.357 mas/yr Dec.: −3.826 mas/yr |
| Parallax (π) | 0.1064±0.0195 mas |
| Distance | 22,600+3,600 −2,600 ly (6,930+1,100 −800 pc) |

Orbit
| Primary | A |
| Companion | B |
| Period (P) | 10,560+786 −518 days |
| Semi-major axis (a) | ≥1.571+0.153 −0.100 au |
| Eccentricity (e) | 0.24±0.08 |
| Periastron epoch (T) | 2,450,000 − 494+492 −706 |
| Semi-amplitude (K_{2}) (secondary) | 1.67+0.08 −0.07 km/s |

Details

A
| Mass | 0.78 M_{☉} |
| Radius | 8.72 ± 0.20 (Note: Calculated, using the Stefan-Boltzmann law and the star's effective temperature and luminosity, with respect to the solar nominal effective temperature of 5,772 K: $$\sqrt{\biggl(\frac{5,772}{5,111}\biggr)^4 \cdot 10^{1.67}} = 8.72\ R_\odot.$$) R_{☉} |
| Luminosity | 46.8+2.2 −2.1 L_{☉} |
| Surface gravity (log g) | 2.46 cgs |
| Temperature | 5,111 K |
| Metallicity [Fe/H] | −5.3 dex |
| Age | 13 Gyr |

B
| Mass | >0.14 M_{☉} |

Other designations
- HE 0107−5240, 2MASS J01092916-5224341.

Database references
| SIMBAD | data |

HE 0107−5240 is a binary star system in the constellation of Phoenix, consisting of extremely metal-poor Population II stars. It is located roughly 6,930 parsecs (22,600 light-years) away from Earth. This system is one of the most metal-poor known in our Galaxy, with a metallicity [Fe/H] = −5.2±0.2; i.e. it has just 1/160000 of the metal that the Sun has. Because of its very low metallicity, it is believed to be one of the earliest Population II stars to have formed. If so, then it is also very old, with an age of roughly 13 billion years. Because the stars are not completely metal-free, they do not belong to the first generation of stars (the hypothetical Population III). Pop III stars converted the pristine hydrogen, helium, and lithium formed by the Big Bang into heavier elements, such as carbon, oxygen, and metals.

HE0107−5240 was found by Norbert Christlieb and colleagues at the University of Hamburg in Germany as a byproduct of the Hamburg/ESO Survey for faint quasars with the 1m ESO Schmidt telescope. Follow-up observations were made at the Siding Spring 2.3 m Telescope and high-resolution spectra were taken at the European Southern Observatory in Chile, using one of the units of the Very Large Telescope. In 2005, a second star with an even smaller iron abundance, HE 1327-2326 ([Fe/H]=-5.4), was found, also in the Hamburg/ESO survey. In 2014 an even more metal poor star was announced: SMSS J031300.36−670839.3. In 2020, HE 0107−5240 was revealed to be an spectroscopic binary system. The orbit has a period of 10,560 days (28.9 years) and a low eccentricity. The companion has a mass of at least 0.14 solar masses.

== See also ==
Other ultra low metallicity / ultra metal poor stars

- Cayrel's Star
- HE 1327−2326
- SDSS J102915+172927
