= Cayrel's Star =

Old population II star in the constellation Cetus

BPS CS31082-0001
Observation data Epoch J2000 Equinox J2000
- Constellation: Cetus
- Right ascension: 01^{h} 29^{m} 31.1311^{s}
- Declination: −16° 00′ 45.496″
- Apparent magnitude (V): 11.642

Astrometry
Proper motion (μ)	RA: 11.745 mas/yr Dec.: −42.709 mas/yr
Parallax (π)	0.4806±0.0462 mas
Distance	6,800 ± 700 ly (2,100 ± 200 pc)

Other designations
- BD−16°251, CS31082-001, Cayrel's Star

Database references
SIMBAD	data

BPS CS31082-0001, named Cayrel's Star /keɪˈrɛlz/, is an old Population II star located in a distance of 2.1 kpc in the galactic halo. It belongs to the class of ultra-metal-poor stars (metallicity [Fe/H] = -2.9), specifically the very rare subclass of neutron-capture enhanced stars. It was discovered by Tim C. Beers and collaborators with the Curtis Schmidt telescope at the Cerro Tololo Inter-American Observatory in Chile and analyzed by Roger Cayrel and collaborators. They used the Very Large Telescope at the European Southern Observatory in Paranal, Chile for high-resolution optical spectroscopy to determine elemental abundances. The thorium-232 to uranium-238 ratio was used to determine the age. It is estimated to be about 12.5 billion years old, making it one of the oldest known.

Compared to other ultra-metal-poor, r-process enriched stars (eg. CS22892-052, BD+17°3248, HE 1523-0901) CS31082-001 has higher abundances of the actinides (Th, U), but a surprisingly low Pb abundance.

== See also ==
- HE 0107-5240
- HE 1327-2326
- SDSS J102915+172927
- SMSS J031300.36-670839.3

== Sources ==
- Beers, T. C.; Preston, G. W.; Shectman, S. A. (October 1985). "A search for stars of very low metal abundance. I". The Astronomical Journal. 90: 2089–2102. Bibcode:1985AJ.....90.2089B. doi:10.1086/113917. ISSN 1538-3881.
- Beers, Timothy C.; Preston, George W.; Shectman, Stephen A. (June 1992). "A search for stars of very low metal abundance. II". The Astronomical Journal. 103: 1987–2034. Bibcode:1992AJ....103.1987B. doi:10.1086/116207. ISSN 1538-3881.
- Cayrel, R.; Hill, V.; et al. (February 2001). "Measurement of stellar age from uranium decay". Nature. 409 (6821): 691–692. arXiv:astro-ph/0104357. Bibcode:2001Natur.409..691C. doi:10.1038/35055507. ISSN 1476-4687. PMID 11217852.
- Schatz, Hendrik; Toenjes, Ralf; et al. (November 2002). "Thorium and Uranium Chronometers Applied to CS 31082-001". The Astrophysical Journal. 579 (2): 626–638. arXiv:astro-ph/0104335. Bibcode:2002ApJ...579..626S. doi:10.1086/342939. ISSN 0004-637X.
