= HD 140283 =

Star in the constellation Libra

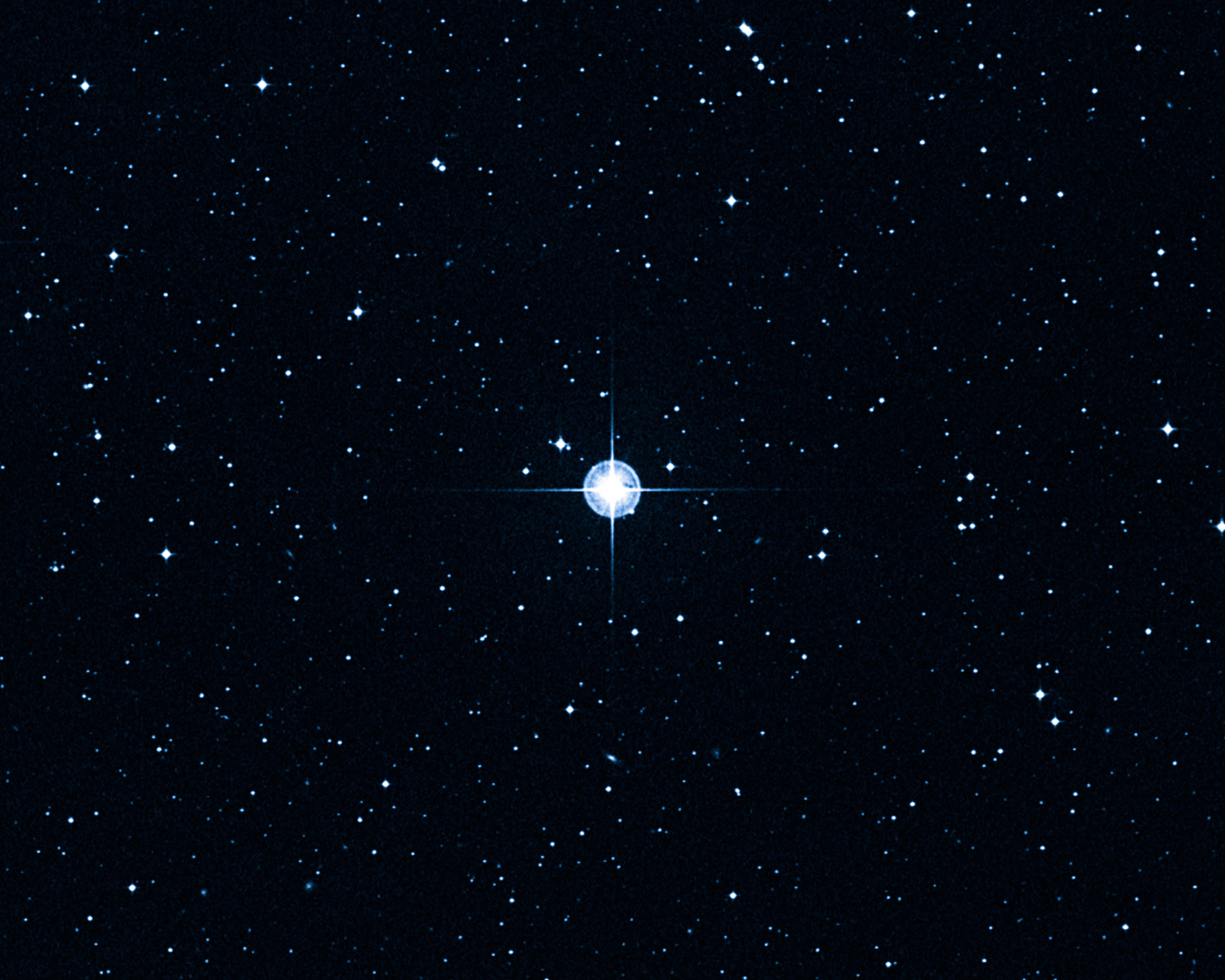
- DSS image of HD 140283

Observation data Epoch J2000.0 Equinox J2000.0
- Constellation: Libra
- Right ascension: 15^{h} 43^{m} 03.09712^{s}
- Declination: −10° 56′ 00.5957″
- Apparent magnitude (V): 7.205±0.02

Characteristics
- Evolutionary stage: subgiant
- Spectral type: G0IV-V m-5

Astrometry
Proper motion (μ)	RA: −1115.141 mas/yr Dec.: −303.573 mas/yr
Parallax (π)	16.2672±0.0260 mas
Distance	200.5 ± 0.3 ly (61.47 ± 0.10 pc)
Absolute magnitude (M_{V})	+3.377

Details
Mass	0.75±0.01 M_{☉}
Radius	2.142±0.040 R_{☉}
Luminosity	4.766±0.055 L_{☉}
Surface gravity (log g)	3.679±0.002 cgs
Temperature	5,787±48 K
Metallicity [Fe/H]	−2.23+0.08 −0.10 dex
Rotational velocity (v sin i)	≤ 3.9 km/s
Age	14.2±0.4 Gyr

Other designations
- BD−10 4149, GJ 1195, HIP 76976, SAO 159459

Database references
SIMBAD	data
ARICNS	data

HD 140283 (also known as the Methuselah Star) is a metal-poor subgiant star about 200 light years away from the Earth in the constellation Libra, near the boundary with Ophiuchus in the Milky Way galaxy. Its apparent magnitude is 7.205, so it can be seen with binoculars. It is the oldest star currently known.

HD 140283's light is somewhat blueshifted as it is moving toward rather than away from the Earth and it has been known to astronomers for over a century as a high-velocity star based on its proper motion. An early spectroscopic analysis by Joseph W. Chamberlain and Lawrence Aller revealed it to have a substantially lower metal content than the Sun. Modern spectroscopic analyses find an iron content about a factor of 250 lower than that of the Sun. It is one of the closest metal-poor (population II) stars to Earth.

The star was already known by 1912 when W. S. Adams measured its astrometry using a spectrograph in the Mount Wilson Observatory.

== Age and significance ==
Because HD 140283 is neither on the main sequence nor is a red giant, its early position in the Hertzsprung–Russell diagram has been interpreted with its data and theoretical models of stellar evolution based on quantum mechanics and the observations of processes in millions of stars to infer its apparent old age. For field stars (as opposed to stars in clusters), it is rare to know a star's luminosity, surface temperature, and composition precisely enough to get a well-constrained value for its age. Because of their relative scarcity, this is even rarer for a population II star such as HD 140283. A study published in 2013 used the Fine Guidance Sensors of NASA's Hubble Space Telescope to measure a precise parallax (and therefore distance and luminosity) for the star. This information was used to estimate an age for the star of 14.46±0.8 billion years. Due to the uncertainty in the value, this age for the star would possibly conflict with the calculated age of the Universe as determined by the final 2018 Planck satellite results of 13.787±0.020 billion years. Subsequent models of its stellar evolution have suggested revision of the star's age to 13.7 billion years or 12 billion years, and an asteroseismic analysis provided a more accurate value of 14.2±0.4 billion years.

Dubbed the "Methuselah Star" by the popular press due to its age, the star must have formed soon after the Big Bang and is one of the oldest stars known as of 2021. The search for such very iron-poor stars has shown they are almost all anomalies in globular clusters and the Galactic Halo. This accords with a narrative that they are rare survivors of their generation. If so, the apparent visual data of the oldest of these enables us to put an upper limit on the date of the reionization (first star formation) phase of the Universe independently of theories and evidence of the first few million years after the Big Bang. Most stars from population II and population III are no longer observable.

Studies of the star also help astronomers understand the Universe's early history. Very low but non-zero metallicities of stars like HD 140283 indicate the star was formed from existing materials in the second generation of stellar creation; their heavy-element content is believed to have come from zero-metal stars (population III stars), which have never been observed. Those first stars are thought to have been formed from existing materials a few hundred million years after the Big Bang, and they died in explosions (supernovae) after only a few million years. A second generation of stars, the generation in which HD 140283 is theorized to have been formed from existing materials, could not have coalesced until gas, heated from the supernova explosions of the earlier stars, cooled down. This hypothesis of such stars' birth and our best models of the early universe indicate that the time it took for the gases to cool was likely only a few tens of millions of years.

The proportions of elements in such metal-poor stars is modelled to tell us much of the earlier nucleosynthetic ("metals") yield, that is of elements other than hydrogen and helium from the supernovae of the locally-extinct population III stars. Some of the latter may be visible in gravitational lensing in looking at deepest images such as the Hubble Ultra-Deep Field (i.e., their brief existence before their turning into supernovae). As with HD 122563, CS22892-0052, and CD−38 245, HD 140283 has an excess of oxygen and the alpha elements relative to iron. While the proportions of these elements is much lower in HD 140283 than in the Sun, they are not as low as is the case for iron. The implication is that the first population of stars generated the alpha elements preferentially to other groups of elements, such as the iron peak and s-process. Unlike those other metal-poor stars, HD 140283 has a detectable amount of lithium, a consequence of HD 140283 having not yet evolved into a red giant and thereby not yet having undergone the first dredge-up.

By 2018, parallax measurements by the Gaia on its second catalogue, Gaia DR2, implied a distance of 62.057 pc (202.40 ly) with an error of 0.44%, which was later improved to 61.673 pc (201.15 ly)±0.16% in the Gaia DR3 Catalog. This is significantly higher than the 58.28 pc (190.1 ly)±4% in the Hipparcos catalogue and 58.3 pc (190 ly)±1.5% from a Hubble parallax, which were used in the previous age estimates, and imply a larger stellar mass and hence a lower age. An age of 12.0±0.5 billion years was estimated in 2022 using evolutionary models and interferometric observations, while a more detailed study in 2024 found an age between 12 and 14 billion years, depending on the chemical abundances used. A 2025 study using asteroseismology found a more precise age of 14.2±0.4 billion years, which is still in agreement with the age of the Universe within one standard deviation.

== See also ==
- HE 1523-0901
- Sneden's Star
- Gaia BH3
