= HE 1327−2326 =

Very low metallicity star in the constellation Hydra

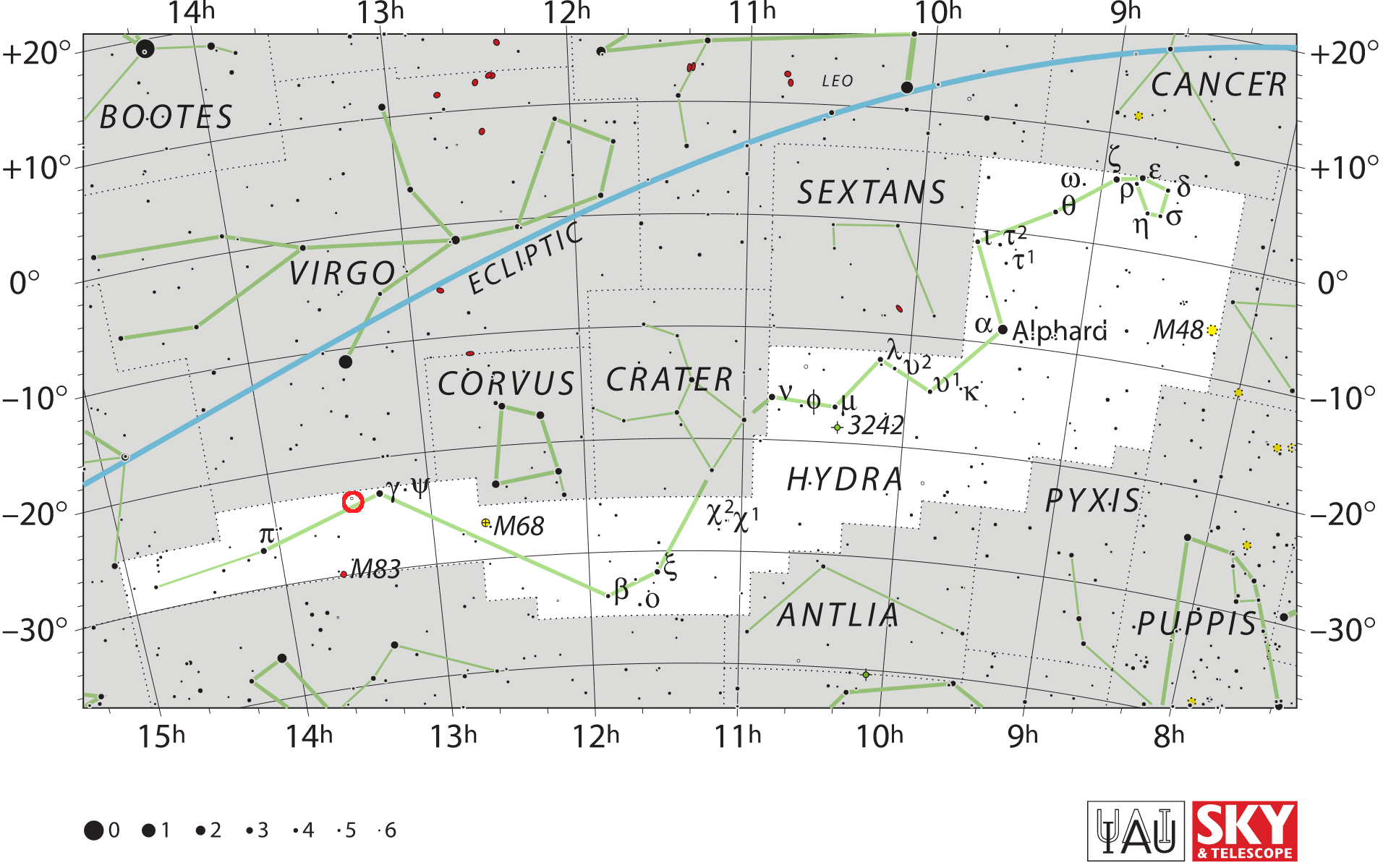
- Location of HE 1327−2326 (circled in red)

Observation data Epoch J2000.0 Equinox ICRS
- Constellation: Hydra
- Right ascension: 13^{h} 30^{m} 05.940^{s}
- Declination: −23° 41′ 49.70″
- Apparent magnitude (V): 13.5

Astrometry
Proper motion (μ)	RA: -52.524±0.040 mas/yr Dec.: 45.498±0.035 mas/yr
Parallax (π)	0.8879±0.0235 mas
Distance	3673+100 −95 ly (1126+30 −29 pc)

Details
Mass	0.7 M_{☉}
Temperature	6,180 K
Metallicity	[Fe/H] = −5.4±0.2

Other designations
- SPM3.2 4266486, 2MASS J13300595-2341497, Gaia DR2 6194815228636688768

Database references
SIMBAD	data

HE 1327−2326, discovered in 2005 by Anna Frebel and collaborators, was the star with the lowest known iron abundance until SMSS J031300.36−670839.3 was discovered. The star is a member of Population II stars, with a solar-standardised iron to hydrogen index [Fe/H], or metallicity, of −5.4±0.2. The scale being logarithmic, this number indicates that its iron content is about 1/250000 that of the Earth's sun. However, it has a carbon abundance of roughly one-tenth solar ([C/H] = −1.0), and it is not known how these two abundances can have been produced/exist simultaneously. Discovered by the Hamburg/ESO survey for metal-poor stars, it was probably formed during an age of the universe when the metal content was much lower. It has been speculated that this star is part of the second generation, born out of the gas clouds which were imbued with elements such as carbon by the primordial Population III stars.

As of 2018, HE 1327−2326 was the brightest star known with [Fe/H] < -5. This is important because the spectral lines for metals are weak in such stars, so a bright star is needed to obtain high signal/noise spectra.

The small amount of metals seen in HE 1327−2326 are believed to have been produced by a supernova event in a first generation star. Spherically symmetric models of supernovae fail to reproduce the relative abundances of metals seen in HE 1327−2326, regardless of the mass of the supernova progenitor. Because of this, Ezzeddine et al. argued in 2019 that HE 1327−2326's metal enrichment was due to an aspherical supernova explosion of a 25 M_{☉} Population III star which enriched the interstellar medium via mass loss through bipolar jets.

== See also ==
Ultra low metallicity / ultra metal poor stars

- Cayrel's Star
- HE 0107−5240
- SDSS J102915+172927
- SMSS J031300.36−670839.3
