= HE 1523−0901 =

Red giant star in the constellation Libra

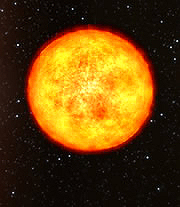
- Artist's impression of HE 1523−0901

Observation data Epoch J2000 Equinox ICRS
- Constellation: Libra
- Right ascension: 15^{h} 26^{m} 01.070^{s}
- Declination: −09° 11′ 38.89″
- Apparent magnitude (V): 11.129

Characteristics
- Evolutionary stage: red giant branch
- Spectral type: CEMP
- B−V color index: +1.057

Astrometry
| Radial velocity (R_{v}) | −162.48±0.34 km/s |
| Proper motion (μ) | RA: −22.685 mas/yr Dec.: −28.204 mas/yr |
| Parallax (π) | 0.3278±0.0197 mas |
| Distance | 9,900 ± 600 ly (3,100 ± 200 pc) |

Details
| Mass | 0.80±0.01 M_{☉} |
| Radius | 27 R_{☉} |
| Luminosity | 730 L_{☉} |
| Surface gravity (log g) | 1.29±0.15 cgs |
| Temperature | 4,742±100 K |
| Metallicity [Fe/H] | −2.65±0.22 dex |
| Age | 13.2 Gyr |

Other designations
- HE 1523−0901, TYC 5594-576-1, 2MASS J15260106−0911388

Database references
| SIMBAD | data |

HE 1523−0901 is the designation given to an ancient red giant star in the Milky Way galaxy approximately 9,900 light-years from Earth. It is thought to be a second generation, Population II, or metal-poor, star ([Fe/H] = −2.95). The star was found in the sample of bright metal-poor halo stars from the Hamburg/ESO Survey by Anna Frebel and collaborators. The group's research was published in the May 10, 2007 issue of The Astrophysical Journal.

== Age ==
The star's age, as measured by ESO's Very Large Telescope, is 13.2 billion years. This makes it among the oldest stars and nearly as old as the estimated age of the universe itself (13.8 billion years as measured by Planck). The measurement uncertainty in the age estimate is 0.7 to 2.7 billion years, depending upon the assumptions made to estimate the uncertainty, although the uncertainty in the relative age of this and other stars using the same method is smaller. HE 1523−0901 is the first star whose age was determined using the decay of the radioactive elements uranium and thorium in tandem with measurements of several neutron capture elements. It is believed to have formed directly from the remnants of the first-generation stars that reached the end of their longevity and exploded as supernovae early in the history of known matter.

== Designation ==
The designation "HE 1523−0901" indicates that the star is part of the Hamburg/ESO Survey catalog. A list of astronomical catalogues can be used to find which catalog a star or other object is from based on its prefix. Most objects are listed in several catalogs and will often be known by several different designations.

== Observation ==
HE 1523−0901 is approximately 0.8 solar masses, but the star has expanded until it is some 27 times as large, and has a total luminosity of 730 times that of the Sun. It can be viewed particularly well from the southern hemisphere with the use of a small telescope. It can also be observed from central European latitudes.

== Spectroscopic companion ==
HE 1523−0901 was found to be a spectroscopic binary by a 2015 study. The companion has a minimum mass about 11 times the mass of Jupiter, suggesting that it may be a brown dwarf or massive exoplanet. However, the discovery paper suggests that the companion's orbit may be nearly face-on, which would make the true mass much greater than the minimum mass, at about a quarter the mass of the Sun. Such an object would be a red dwarf star. The orbital inclination and thus true mass is not yet known with certainty.

The HE 1523−0901 planetary system
| Companion (in order from star) | Mass | Semimajor axis (AU) | Orbital period (days) | Eccentricity | Inclination (°) | Radius |
|---|---|---|---|---|---|---|
| b | ≥11+4 −1 M_{J} | — | 303.05±0.25 | 0.163±0.010 | — | — |

== See also ==
- HD 140283
- Sneden's Star
- Gaia BH3
