= BD+17°3248 =

Star in the constellation Hercules

Observation data Epoch J2000 Equinox ICRS
- Constellation: Hercules
- Right ascension: 17^{h} 28^{m} 14.4690^{s}
- Declination: +17° 30′ 35.848″
- Apparent magnitude (V): 9.37

Characteristics
- Spectral type: KII vw
- U−B color index: +0.08
- B−V color index: +0.66

Astrometry
| Radial velocity (R_{v}) | –146.55 km/s |
| Proper motion (μ) | RA: −47.611(13) mas/yr Dec.: −22.366(13) mas/yr |
| Parallax (π) | 1.2357±0.0129 mas |
| Distance | 2,640 ± 30 ly (809 ± 8 pc) |
| Absolute magnitude (M_{V}) | +2.16+0.74 −1.14 |

Details
| Mass | 0.55–0.85 M_{☉} |
| Radius | 12.64+0.39 −0.93 R_{☉} |
| Luminosity | 117±5 L_{☉} |
| Surface gravity (log g) | 2.30 cgs |
| Temperature | 5,200±150 K |
| Metallicity [Fe/H] | –2.02 dex |
| Age | 13.8±4 Gyr |

Other designations
- BD+17 3248, HIP 85487, PPM 133421

Database references
| SIMBAD | data |

BD+17°3248 is an old Population II star located at a distance of roughly 968 light-years (297 parsecs) in the Galactic Halo. It belongs to the class of ultra-metal-poor stars, especially the very rare subclass of neutron-capture (r-process) enhanced stars.

Since about 2000, the star has been studied with 3 telescopes: the Hubble Space Telescope, the Keck I telescope and the Harlan J. Smith Telescope at the McDonald Observatory of the University of Texas. Elemental abundances in the range from germanium (Z=32) up to uranium (Z=92) have been determined. The Hubble Space Telescope was used to observe the ultraviolet part of the stellar spectra. This allowed the measurement of platinum, osmium and, for the first time outside of the Solar System, gold. From barium (Z=56) onward, all elements show a pattern of r-process contribution to the abundances of the elements in the Solar system.

The University of Mainz and University of Basel groups of Karl-Ludwig Kratz and Friedrich-Karl Thielemann performed a comparison between the observed abundances for the stable element europium (Z=63) and the radioactive elements thorium (Z=90) and uranium (Z=92) to the calculated abundances of an r-process in a Type II supernova explosion. This allowed the age of this star to be estimated as about 13.8 billion years with an uncertainty of 4 billion years. A similar age was derived for another ultra-metal-poor star (CS31082-001) from thorium to uranium ratios. These stars were born several hundred million years after the Big Bang.
