= Francesca Primas =

Italian astronomer

Francesca Primas is an Italian astronomer at the European Southern Observatory in Germany. Her research studies the historical evolution of chemical abundances in the Milky Way and its satellite galaxies; she is also known for her activism for improving the gender balance of professional astronomy.

== Education and career ==
Primas was a high school student in Gorizia, and studied astronomy at the University of Trieste, both in Italy. She earned a laurea (the Italian equivalent of a master's degree) in 1992, and completed a PhD there in 1995.

After postdoctoral research at the University of Chicago in the US from 1995 to 1997, and at the European Southern Observatory from 1997 to 2000, she continued at the European Southern Observatory as a support astronomer beginning in 2000, became head of the user support department in 2006, and was promoted to full astronomer in 2015.

In approximately 2008, she authored a study of gender distribution among European Southern Observatory astronomers. The low representation she found, with only 18% of ESO astronomers identifying as female, sparked significant discussion and change at the observatory, and she became a co-founder of the observatory's Diversity and Inclusion Committee. She has also chaired the Working Group on Women in Astronomy of the International Astronomical Union (IAU), and directed an IAU project to publicize the work of over 600 women in astronomy.

== Recognition ==
In 2023, Primas was named as the inaugural recipient of the Nancy Grace Roman Award for Promoting Gender Equity of the Astronomical Society of the Pacific.
