= CEMP star =

Chemically peculiar stars

Carbon-enhanced metal-poor stars, usually referred to as CEMP stars, are a class of chemically peculiar star. CEMP stars have [C/Fe] > +1, which means compared to the Sun these stars have carbon enhanced at least ten times more than iron, and [Fe/H] < −1, meaning that iron is less than a tenth that in the Sun.

These are further categorized by whether r-process or s-process elements are enhanced. CEMP-no stars have no enhancement. Some of these are the earliest formed in the Milky Way. The others are termed CEMP-r, CEMP-s, or CEMP-r/s. Metal-poor stars are more likely to be CEMP stars, and once [Fe/H] < −5.0, then all the stars are CEMP stars.

== Subdivisions ==
CEMP-r stars have [Eu/Fe] > +1 and [Ba/Eu] < 0.

CEMP-s stars have [Ba/Fe] > +1 and [Ba/Eu] > +0.5 80% of CEMP stars fall into this category.

CEMP-r/s stars have [Ba/Eu] between 0 and +0.5 so they are under the level for CEMP-s stars.

CEMP-no stars have [Ba/Fe] < 0. About 20% of CEMP stars fall into this category.
