= HD 122563 =

Star in the Boötes constellation

Observation data Epoch J2000 Equinox ICRS
- Constellation: Boötes
- Right ascension: 14^{h} 02^{m} 31.84551^{s}
- Declination: +09° 41′ 09.9444″
- Apparent magnitude (V): 6.20

Characteristics
- Spectral type: G8:III: Fe-5
- U−B color index: +0.38
- B−V color index: +0.90
- V−R color index: 0.50
- R−I color index: 0.58
- Variable type: Suspected

Astrometry
Radial velocity (R_{v})	−26.39 km/s
Proper motion (μ)	RA: −189.539 mas/yr Dec.: −70.415 mas/yr
Parallax (π)	3.0991±0.0332 mas
Distance	1,050 ± 10 ly (323 ± 3 pc)
Absolute magnitude (M_{V})	−0.69

Details
Mass	0.77±0.05 M_{☉}
Radius	28.86±0.63 R_{☉}
Luminosity	339±13 L_{☉}
Surface gravity (log g)	1.404±0.035 cgs
Temperature	4,635±34 K
Metallicity [Fe/H]	−2.75±0.12 dex
Rotational velocity (v sin i)	5.0 km/s
Age	12.6 Gyr

Other designations
- BD+10°2617, HIP 68594, HD 122563, HR 5270, SAO 120251

Database references
SIMBAD	data

HD 122563 is an extremely metal-poor red giant star, and the brightest known metal-poor star in the sky. Its low heavy element content was first recognized by spectroscopic analysis in 1963. For more than twenty years it was the most metal-poor star known, being more metal-poor than any known globular cluster, and it is the most accessible example of an extreme population II or Halo star.

As the most extreme metal-poor star known, HD 122563's composition was crucial in constraining theories for galactic chemical evolution; in particular, its composition peculiarities provided signposts for understanding the accumulation of heavy elements by stellar nucleosynthesis in the Galaxy. For example, it has an excess of oxygen, [O/Fe] = +0.6, while the proportions of strontium, yttrium, zirconium, barium and the lanthanide elements suggest that the s-process has made no contribution to the material present in the star: in HD 122563, all these elements are products of the r-process instead. The implication is that the star formed at a time and place where there had not been enough time for any previous generation of stars to have produced s-process elements, though there was r-process material present.

== Spectral type ==
The spectral type of HD 122563 is one of characteristics which initially indicated its peculiarity. In the Bright Star Catalogue its spectral type is given as F8 IV, but its color index indicates a surface temperature much cooler than an F8 star should be. Because the spectral type of a star in the A to K star regime is judged by the relative strengths of the absorption lines of the metals relative to the hydrogen Balmer lines, the extreme metal deficiency results in weak metal lines and yields a spuriously early spectral type. If the spectral classification is performed including the metal deficiency, the result is a rather later type, G8:III: Fe-5.
