= Friedrich-Karl Thielemann =

Friedrich-Karl "Friedel“ Thielemann (born 17 April 1951 in Mülheim an der Ruhr) is a German-Swiss theoretical astrophysicist.

Thielemann studied at the TH Darmstadt, where he in 1976 he acquired his Diplom. In 1980 he earned his PhD under Wolfgang Hillebrandt (in Garching) and E. R. Hilf in nuclear astrophysics. As a post-doc he was with David Schramm and William David Arnett at the University of Chicago, William A. Fowler at Caltech, Hans Klapdor at the Max-Planck-Institut für Kernphysik, am Max-Planck-Institut für Astrophysik in Garching (with Hillebrandt) and at the University of Illinois (with James W. Truran). Starting in 1986 he was Assistant Professor and from 1991 Associate Professor at the Center for Astrophysics | Harvard & Smithsonian and at the Harvard Observatory of Harvard University. In 1994 he became a professor at the University of Basel. In 1995 he was a guest professor at the University of Turin and from 1997 to 2001 a guest scientist at Oak Ridge National Laboratory.

Besides theoretical and computer-simulated astrophysics and nuclear astrophysics (including important nuclear reactions and properties of unstable stellar cores, equations of state of quark-matter and core matter of higher density), he worked on the modeling of astrophysical plasmas for important subatomic processes. He investigated, among other things, supernovae, X-ray bursts, gamma ray bursts, fusion of neutron stars, emergence of heavy elements, and evolution of chemical elements in galaxies.

In 1979 he received the Otto Hahn Medal. In 1998 he was elected a fellow of the American Physical Society for "his work at the interface of nuclear physics and astrophysics and the applications to stellar nucleosynthesis, Type Ia and Type II Supernovae, as well as the r- and rp-process." In 2008 he received the Hans Bethe Prize "for his many outstanding theoretical contributions to the understanding of nucleosynthesis, stellar evolution and stellar explosions." Since 2004 he is a member of the Swiss Research Council.
