= SDSS J102915+172927 =

Population II star in the constellation Leo

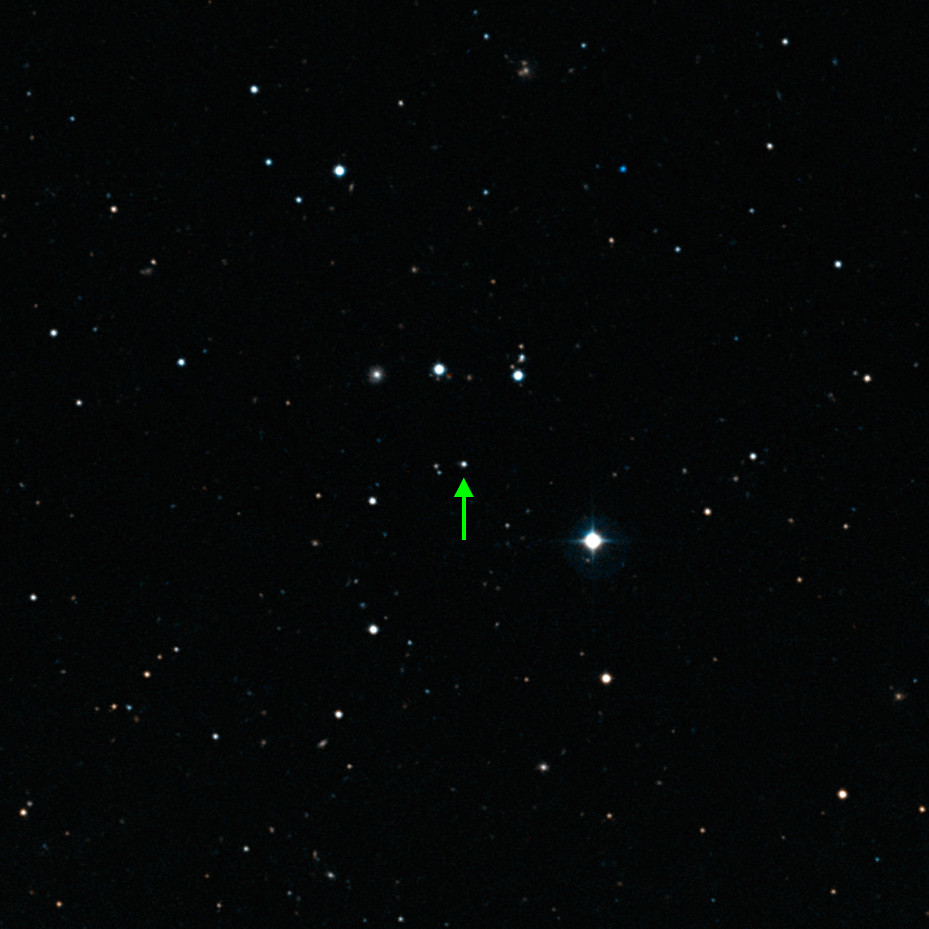
- SDSS J102915 172927 in Digitized Sky Survey images.

Observation data Epoch J2000.0 Equinox ICRS
- Constellation: Leo
- Right ascension: 10^{h} 29^{m} 15.1490^{s}
- Declination: +17° 29′ 27.925″
- Apparent magnitude (V): +16.92

Characteristics
- B−V color index: 0.03

Astrometry
Proper motion (μ)	RA: −10.720(63) mas/yr Dec.: −3.921(54) mas/yr
Parallax (π)	0.6482±0.0598 mas
Distance	5,000 ± 500 ly (1,500 ± 100 pc)

Details
Mass	≤ 0.8 M_{☉}
Temperature	5811 K
Metallicity	≤ 6.9×10^{−7}

Other designations
- 2MASS J10291514+1729278

Database references
SIMBAD	data

SDSS J102915+172927 or Caffau's Star is a population II star in the galactic halo, seen in the constellation Leo. It is about 13 billion years old, making it one of the oldest stars in the Galaxy. At the time of its discovery, it had the lowest metallicity of any known star. It is small (less than 0.8 solar masses), deficient in carbon, nitrogen, oxygen, and completely devoid of lithium. Because carbon and oxygen provide a fine structure cooling mechanism that is critical in the formation of low-mass stars, the origins of Caffau's Star are somewhat mysterious. It has been suggested, both for theoretical and observational reasons, that the formation of low-mass stars in the interstellar medium requires a critical metallicity somewhere between 1.5×10^{−8} and 1.5×10^{−6}.

The metallicity of Caffau's Star is less than 6.9×10^{−7}. According to Schneider et al., cooling by dust rather than the fine structure lines of CII and OI may have enabled the creation of such low-mass, metal-poor stars in the early universe. The absence of lithium implies past temperatures of at least two million Kelvin.

Data from Gaia's DR2 released in 2018 confirmed that SDSS J102915+172927 is a dwarf star.

The star was described by Elisabetta Caffau et al. in an article published by the journal Nature in September 2011. Caffau had been searching for extremely metal-poor stars for the past ten years. It was identified by automated software which analyzed data from the Sloan Digital Sky Survey. This was followed up by observations with the X-shooter and UVES instruments on the Very Large Telescope in Chile. As of 2011 Caffau and her team expect to find between five and fifty similar stars with the telescope in the future.

== See also ==
- Nucleosynthesis
- Spite plateau
- List of stars in Leo

Ultra low metallicity / ultra metal poor stars

- Cayrel's Star
- HE 0107-5240
- HE 1327-2326
