= Stellar population =

Grouping of stars by similar metallicity

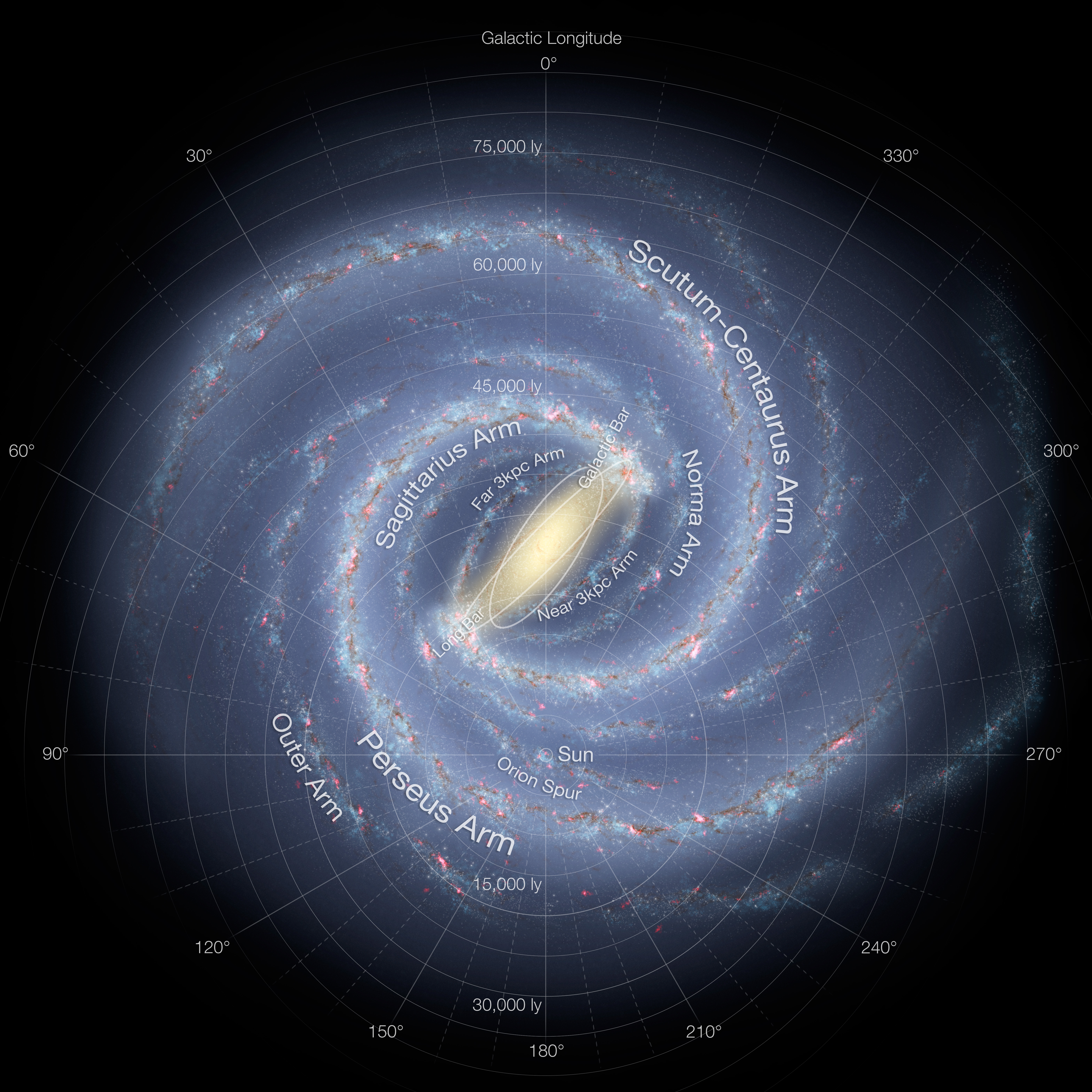
Artist's conception of the spiral structure of the Milky Way showing Baade's general population categories. The blue regions in the spiral arms are composed of the younger population I stars, while the yellow stars in the central bulge are the older population II stars. In reality, many population I stars are also found mixed in with the older population II stars.

In 1944, Walter Baade categorized groups of stars within the Milky Way into stellar populations. In the abstract of the article by Baade, he recognizes that Jan Oort originally conceived this type of classification in 1926.

Baade observed that bluer stars were strongly associated with the spiral arms, and yellow stars dominated near the central galactic bulge and within globular star clusters. Two main divisions were deemed population I and population II stars, with another newer, hypothetical division called population III added in 1978.

Among the population types, significant differences were found with their individual observed stellar spectra. These were later shown to be very important and were possibly related to star formation, observed kinematics, stellar age, and even galaxy evolution in both spiral and elliptical galaxies. These three simple population classes usefully divided stars by their chemical composition, or metallicity. In astrophysics nomenclature metal refers to all elements heavier than helium, including chemical non-metals such as oxygen.

By definition, each population group shows the trend where lower metal content indicates higher age of stars. Hence, the first stars in the universe (very low metal content) were deemed population III, old stars (low metallicity) as population II, and recent stars (high metallicity) as population I. The Sun is considered population I, a recent star with a relatively high 1.4% metallicity.

== Stellar development ==
Observation of stellar spectra has revealed that stars older than the Sun have fewer heavy elements compared with the Sun. This immediately suggests that metallicity has evolved through the generations of stars by the process of stellar nucleosynthesis.

=== Formation of the first stars ===
Under current cosmological models, all matter created in the Big Bang was mostly hydrogen (75%) and helium (25%), with only a very tiny fraction consisting of other light elements such as lithium and beryllium. When the universe had cooled sufficiently, the first stars were born as population III stars, without any contaminating heavier metals. This is postulated to have affected their structure so that their stellar masses became hundreds of times more than that of the Sun. In turn, these massive stars also evolved very quickly, and their nucleosynthetic processes created the first 26 elements (up to iron in the periodic table).

Many theoretical stellar models show that most high-mass population III stars rapidly exhausted their fuel and likely exploded in extremely energetic pair-instability supernovae. Those explosions would have thoroughly dispersed their material, ejecting metals into the interstellar medium (ISM), to be incorporated into the later generations of stars. Their destruction suggests that no galactic high-mass population III stars should be observable. However, some population III stars might be seen in high-redshift galaxies whose light originated during the earlier history of the universe. Scientists have found evidence of an extremely small ultra metal-poor star, slightly smaller than the Sun, found in a binary system of the spiral arms in the Milky Way. The discovery opens up the possibility of observing even older stars.

Stars too massive to produce a pair-instability supernova would have likely collapsed into black holes through a process known as photodisintegration. Here some matter may have escaped during this process in the form of relativistic jets, and this also could have distributed the first metals into the universe. (Note: It has been proposed that recent supernovae SN 2006gy and SN 2007bi may have been pair-instability supernovae where such super-massive population III stars exploded. Clark (2010) speculates that these stars could have formed relatively recently in dwarf galaxies, since they contain mainly primordial, metal-free interstellar matter. Past supernovae in these small galaxies could have ejected their metal-rich contents at speeds high enough for them to escape the galaxy, keeping the small galaxies' metal content very low.)

=== Formation of the observed stars ===
The oldest stars observed thus far, known as population II, have very low metallicities; as subsequent generations of stars were born, they became more metal-enriched, as the gaseous clouds from which they formed received the metal-rich dust manufactured by previous generations of stars from population III.

As those population II stars died, they returned metal-enriched material to the interstellar medium via planetary nebulae and supernovae, enriching further the nebulae, out of which the newer stars formed. These youngest stars, including the Sun, therefore have the highest metal content, and are known as population I stars.

== Chemical classification by Walter Baade ==
=== Population I stars ===
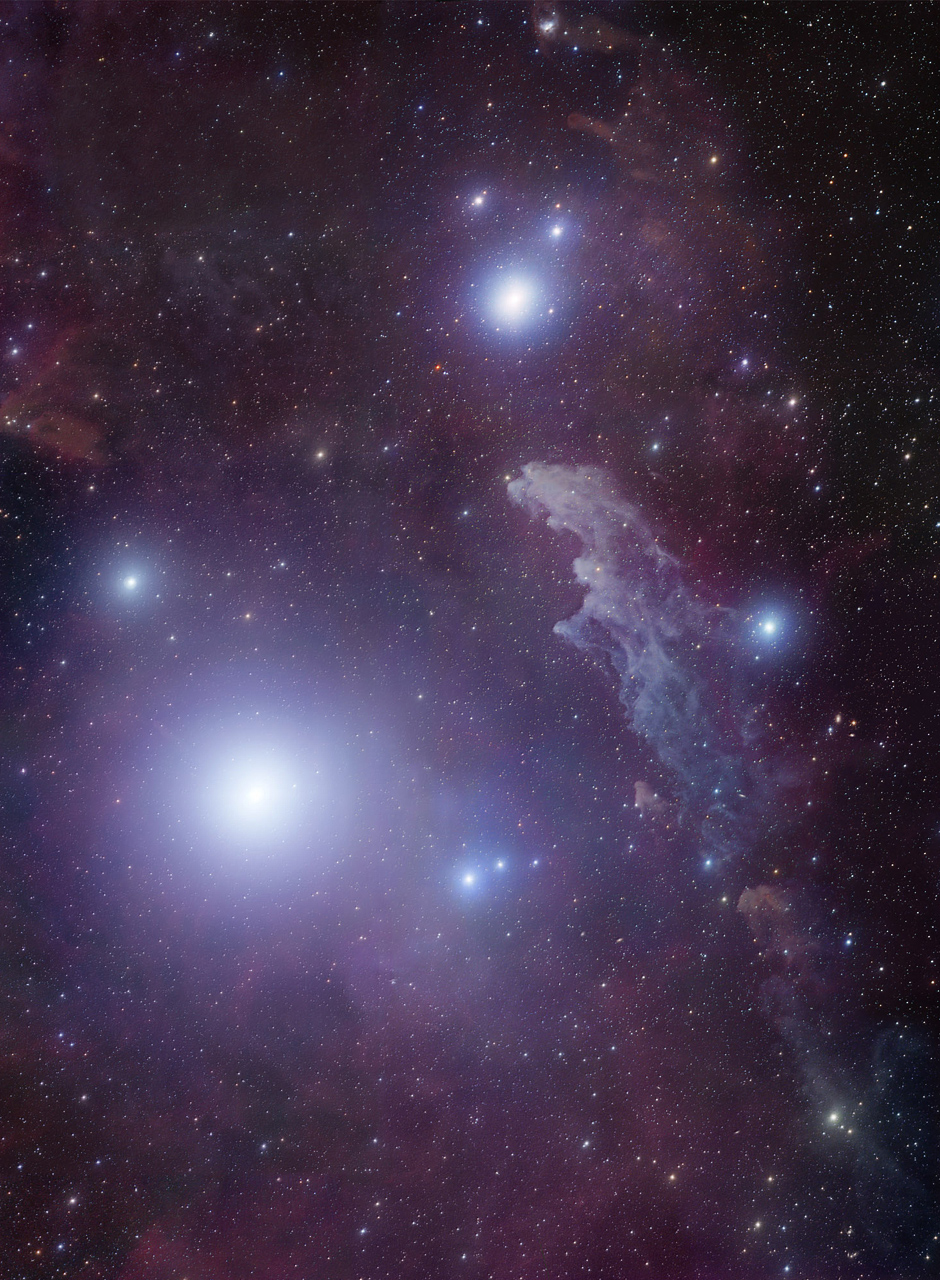
Population I star Rigel with reflection nebula IC 2118

Population I stars are young stars with the highest metallicity out of all three populations and are more commonly found in the spiral arms of the Milky Way galaxy. The Sun is considered as an intermediate population I star, while the sun-like μ Arae is much richer in metals. (The term metal-rich is used to describe stars with a significantly higher metallicity than the Sun; higher than can be explained by measurement error.)

Population I stars usually have regular elliptical orbits of the Galactic Center, with a low relative velocity. It was earlier hypothesized that the high metallicity of population I stars makes them more likely to possess planetary systems than the other two populations, because planets, particularly terrestrial planets, are thought to be formed by the accretion of metals. However, observations of the Kepler Space Telescope data have found smaller planets around stars with a range of metallicities, while only larger, potential gas giant planets are concentrated around stars with relatively higher metallicity – a finding that has implications for theories of gas-giant formation. Between the intermediate population I and the population II stars comes the intermediate disc population.

=== Population II stars ===
The Milky Way. Population II stars are in the galactic bulge and globular clusters.

Population II, or metal-poor, stars are those with relatively little of the elements heavier than helium. These objects were formed during an earlier time of the universe. Intermediate population II stars are common in the bulge near the centre of the Milky Way, whereas population II stars found in the galactic halo are older and thus more metal-deficient. Globular clusters also contain high numbers of population II stars.

A characteristic of population II stars is that despite their lower overall metallicity, they often have a higher ratio of alpha elements (elements produced by the alpha process, like oxygen and neon) relative to iron (Fe) as compared with population I stars; current theory suggests that this is the result of type II supernovas being more important contributors to the interstellar medium at the time of their formation, whereas type Ia supernova metal-enrichment came at a later stage in the universe's development.

In particular, a combination of extremely low levels of iron, and very high levels of carbon have been found in extremely old/low metallicity stars, both in our galaxy and outside it - a candidate Population II star in the ultrafaint dwarf galaxy Pictor II was found to have iron levels < 1/43,000 and calcium levels < 1/160,000 of the sun, but carbon > 3000x solar levels. As Pictor II is extremely small, a violent supernova would have ejected all material that did not fall back into the resulting compact object, so it is suspected that the elements formed in lower energy supernovae.

Scientists have targeted these oldest stars in several different surveys, including the HK objective-prism survey of Timothy C. Beers et al. and the Hamburg-ESO survey of Norbert Christlieb et al., originally started for faint quasars. Thus far, they have uncovered and studied in detail about ten ultra-metal-poor (UMP) stars (such as Sneden's Star, Cayrel's Star, BD +17° 3248) and three of the oldest stars known to date: HE 0107-5240, HE 1327-2326 and HE 1523-0901. Caffau's star was identified as the most metal-poor star yet when it was found in 2012 using Sloan Digital Sky Survey data. However, in February 2014 the discovery of an even lower-metallicity star was announced, SMSS J031300.36-670839.3 located with the aid of SkyMapper astronomical survey data. Less extreme in their metal deficiency, but nearer and brighter and hence longer known, are HD 122563 (a red giant) and HD 140283 (a subgiant). Gaia BH3, the second-nearest known black hole to Earth located in the ED-2 halo stellar stream, also has an ultra-metal-poor companion. Given its unusually high mass of around 32.70 solar masses, this suggests that massive Population II stars experienced less mass loss, allowing for the formation of stellar black holes greater than the mass limit formed from metal-rich progenitors.

=== Population III stars ===
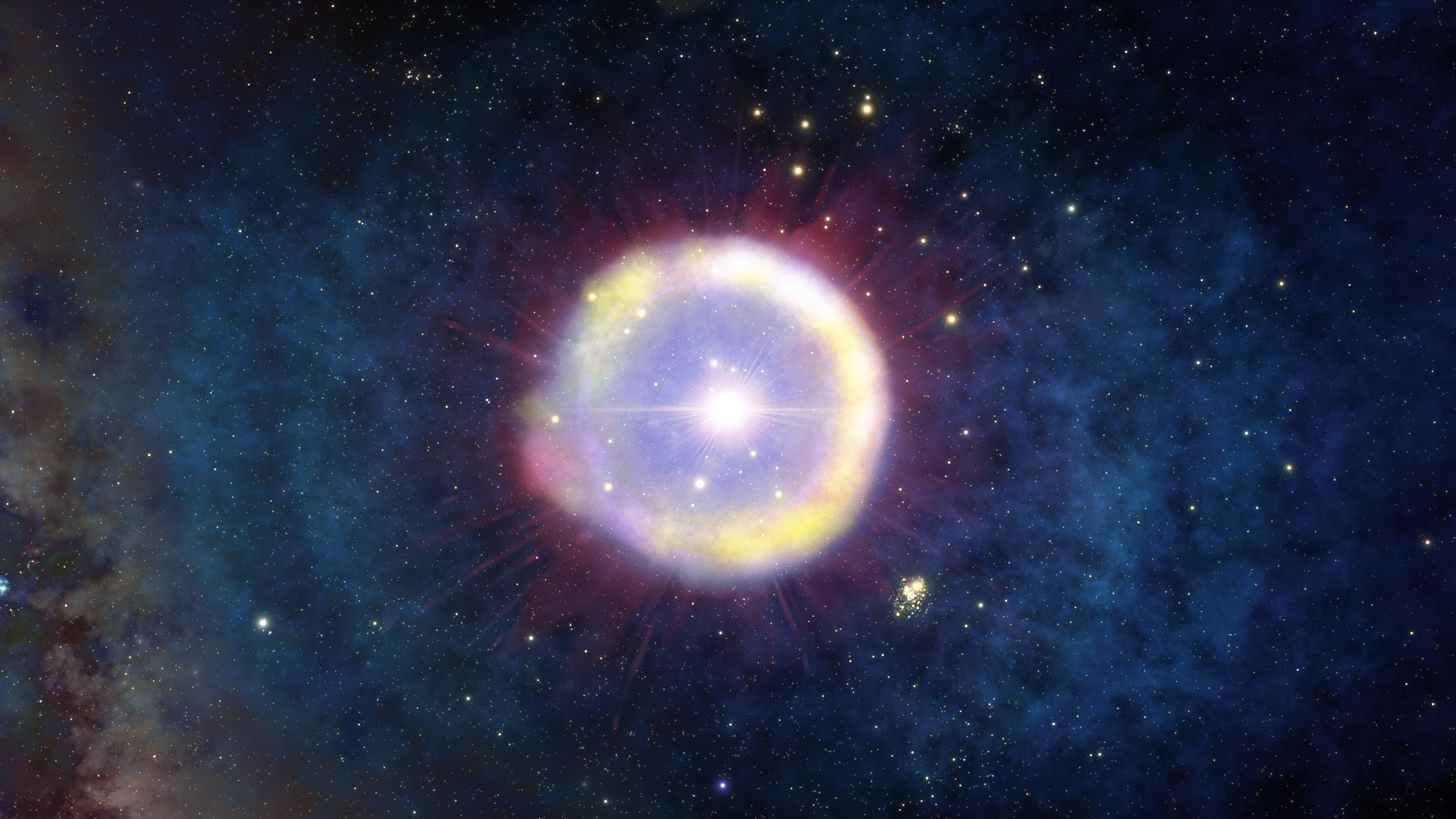
Artist's impression of a field of population III stars 100 million years after the Big Bang.

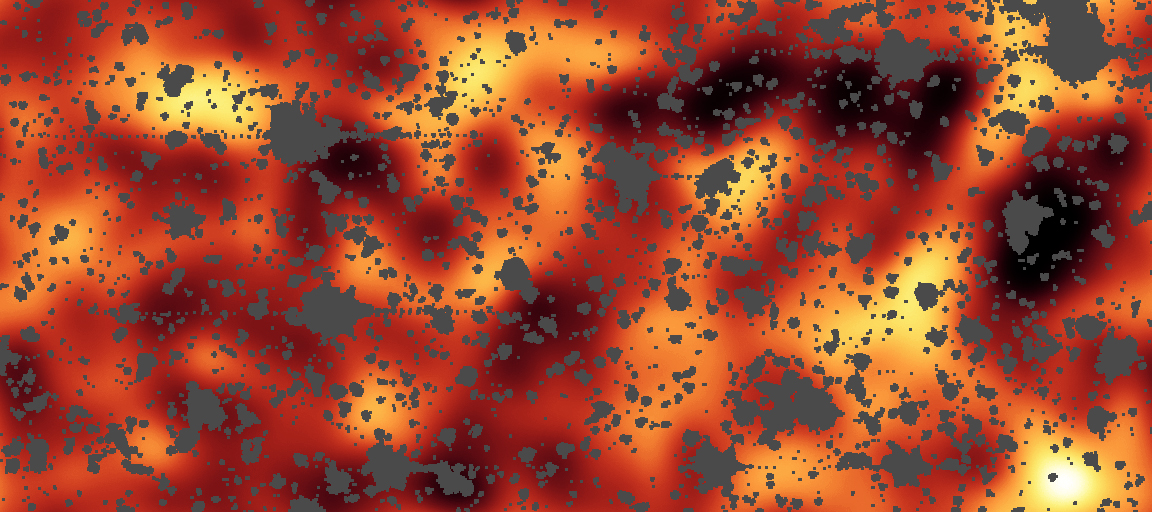
Possible glow of population III stars imaged by NASA's Spitzer Space Telescope

Population III stars are a hypothetical population of extremely massive, luminous and hot stars with virtually no "metals", except possibly for intermixing ejecta from other nearby, early population III supernovae. The term was first introduced by Neville J. Woolf in 1965. Such stars are likely to have existed in the very early universe (i.e., at high redshift) and may have started the production of chemical elements heavier than hydrogen, which are needed for the later formation of planets and life as we know it.

The existence of population III stars is inferred from physical cosmology, but they have not yet been observed directly. Indirect evidence for their existence has been found in a gravitationally lensed galaxy in a very distant part of the universe. Their existence may account for the fact that heavy elements – which could not have been created in the Big Bang – are observed in quasar emission spectra. They are also thought to be components of faint blue galaxies. These stars likely triggered the universe's period of reionization, a major phase transition of the hydrogen gas composing most of the interstellar medium. Observations of the galaxy UDFy-38135539 suggest that it may have played a role in this reionization process. The European Southern Observatory discovered a bright pocket of early population stars in the very bright galaxy Cosmos Redshift 7 from the reionization period around 800 million years after the Big Bang, at z = 6.60. The rest of the galaxy has some later redder population II stars. Some theories hold that there were two generations of population III stars.

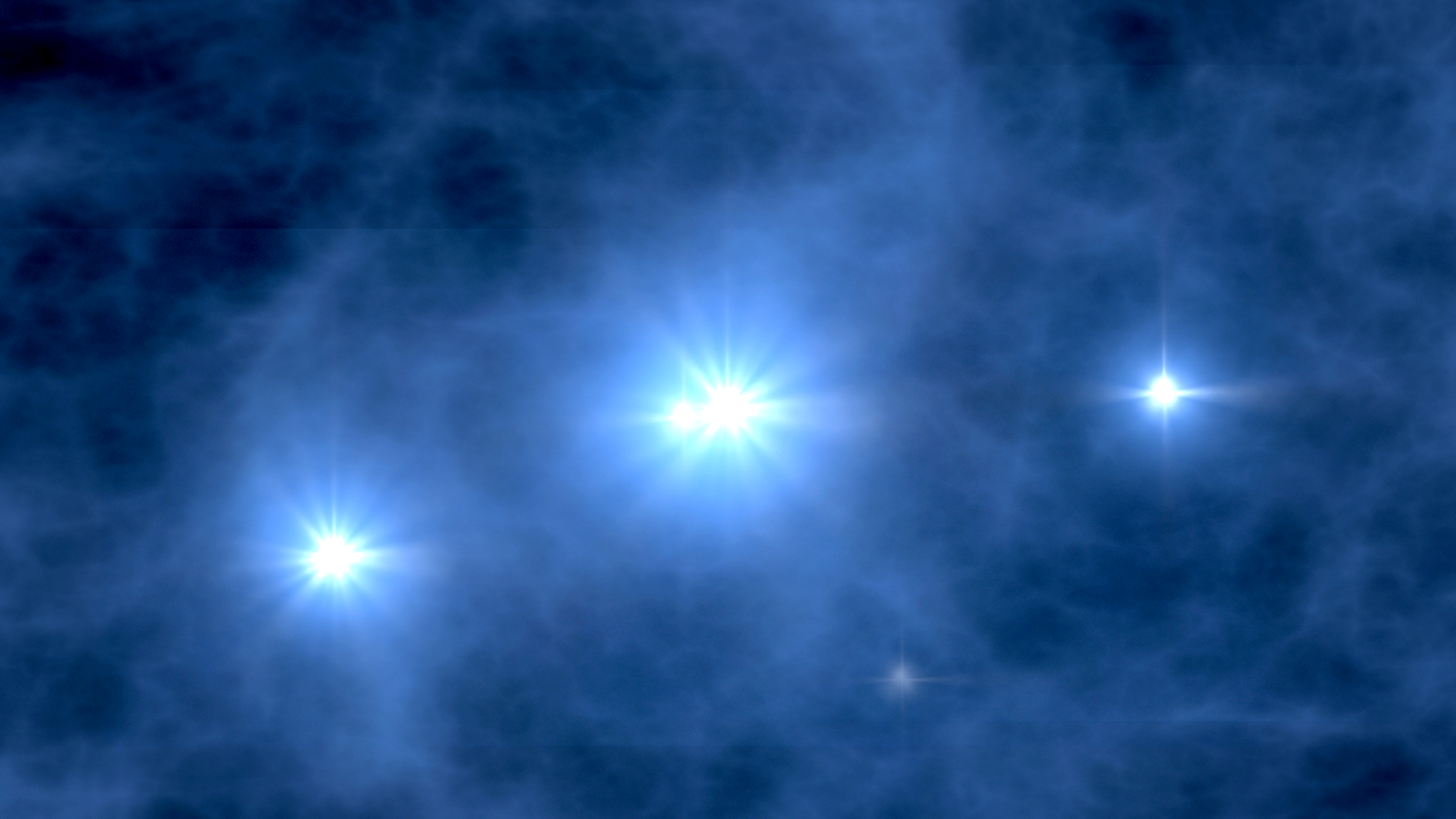
Artist's impression of the first stars, 400 million years after the Big Bang

Current theory is divided on whether the first stars were very massive or not. One possibility is that these stars were much larger than current stars: several hundred solar masses, and possibly up to 1,000 solar masses. Such stars would be very short-lived and last only 2–5 million years. The lack of heavy elements and a much warmer interstellar medium from the Big Bang may have allowed such large stars to form. Conversely, theories proposed in 2009 and 2011 suggest that the first star groups might have consisted of a massive star surrounded by several smaller stars. The smaller stars, if they remained in the birth cluster, would accumulate more gas and could not survive to the present day, but a 2017 study concluded that if a star of 0.8 solar masses (M_{☉}) or less was ejected from its birth cluster before it accumulated more mass, it could survive to the present day, possibly even in our Milky Way galaxy.

Analysis of data of extremely low-metallicity population II stars such as HE 0107-5240, which are thought to contain the metals produced by population III stars, suggest that these metal-free stars had masses of 20~130 solar masses. On the other hand, analysis of globular clusters associated with elliptical galaxies suggests pair-instability supernovae, which are typically associated with very massive stars, were responsible for their metallic composition. This also explains why there have been no low-mass stars with zero metallicity observed, despite models constructed for smaller population III stars. Clusters containing zero-metallicity red dwarfs or brown dwarfs (possibly created by pair-instability supernovae) have been proposed as dark matter candidates, but searches for these types of MACHOs through gravitational microlensing have produced negative results.

Population III stars are considered seeds of black holes in the early universe. Unlike high-mass black hole seeds, such as direct collapse black holes, they would have produced light ones. If they could have grown to larger than expected masses, then they could have been quasi-stars, other hypothetical seeds of heavy black holes which would have existed in the early development of the Universe before hydrogen and helium were contaminated by heavier elements.

Detection of population III stars is a goal of NASA's James Webb Space Telescope.

On 8 December 2022, astronomers reported the possible detection of population III stars, in a high-redshift galaxy called RX J2129–z8He II.

On 27 October 2025, astronomers published a paper in the Astrophysical Journal Letters, reporting that LAP1-B might be the first observed cluster of population III stars, with a redshift of z=6.6 and with a total mass of up to 2700 solar masses, that seemingly meets the three most critical criteria for a star to be considered as a population III star.

== See also ==
- Lists of astronomical objects
- Lists of stars
- Peekaboo Galaxy
