= Hamburg/ESO Survey =

The Hamburg/ESO Survey is an astrometric star catalogue published by the University of Hamburg. The catalog contains stars between magnitudes 13 and 18 covering the Southern extragalactic sky.

The stated goals of the catalog are

- Compile samples of high-redshift (1.5 < z < 3.2), bright Quasi-stellar objects suited for high-resolution spectroscopy (e.g., for the ESO-VLT);
- Provide targets for ultraviolet spectroscopy with HST
- Discover new gravitationally lensed systems
- Construct large flux-limited and bias-free samples of bright low-redshift QSOs and Seyferts for host galaxy studies
- Determine the local luminosity function of QSOs
- Study the evolution of the most luminous part of the QSO population
